= List of World Grand Champion Tennessee Walking Horses =

The Tennessee Walking Horse National Celebration is the oldest breed-specific show for the Tennessee Walking Horse. While it includes over 100 classes, only one horse is selected as World Grand Champion every year. Almost all winners are stallions.

== Winners ==
World Grand Champion Tennessee Walking Horses
Year	Photo	Horse	Trainer	Owner
1939		Strolling Jim, chestnut gelding foaled 1936	Floyd Carothers	Col. C. H. Bacon
1940		Haynes Peacock, chestnut gelding f. 1927	Col. J. L. Haynes	Col. J. L. Haynes
1941		Haynes Peacock, chestnut gelding f. 1927	Col. J. L. Haynes	Col. J. L. Haynes
1942		Melody Maid, chestnut mare f. 1937	Floyd Carothers	Mr. & Mrs. Frank D. Rambo
1943		Black Angel, black mare	Winston Wiser	Mr. & Mrs. R. F. Ellis
1944		City Girl, chestnut mare f. 1939	Urban Small	M. J. Meyer
1945		Midnight Sun, black stallion f. 1940	Fred Walker	Harlinsdale Farm
1946		Midnight Sun, black stallion f. 1940	Fred Walker	Harlinsdale Farm
1947		Merry Go Boy, black stallion f. 1943	Winston Wiser	Wiser, Mallard, Norman
1948		Merry Go Boy, black stallion f. 1943	Winston Wiser	C. C. Turner
1949		Midnight Merry, black mare f. 1946	Steve Hill	J. N. McEachern
1950		Old Glory's Big Man, chestnut stallion f. 1945	Carl Edwards	Mr. & Mrs. J. T. Budd
1951		The Talk of the Town, bay gelding f. 1947	Steve Hill	L. A. Chernell & E. P. Ripley
1952		The Talk of the Town, bay gelding f. 1947	Steve Hill	L. A. Chernell & E. P. Ripley
1953		The Talk of the Town, bay gelding f. 1947	Steve Hill	L. A. Chernell & E. P. Ripley
1954		White Star, Maximum white sabino mare f. 1949	Percy Moss	Dr. W. V. Garnier
1955		Go Boy's Shadow, black stallion f. 1952	Winston Wiser	Wiser & Padgett
1956		Go Boy's Shadow, black stallion f. 1952	Winston Wiser	Wiser & Padgett
1957		Sun's Jet Parade, black stallion f. 1951	Vic Thompson	G. G. Gardebled
1958		Setting Sun, chestnut stallion f. 1952	Sam Paschal	M. M. Bullard
1959		Rodger's Perfection, black stallion f. 1955	Joe Webb	Dr. Porter Rodgers
1960		Mack K's Handshaker, black stallion f. 1956	Doug Wolaver	Doug & Myron Wolaver
1961		B. Major Wilson, bay stallion, f. 1952	Claude Brown	Claude Brown
1962		Ebony Masterpiece, black stallion f. 1955	Sam Paschal	Billy Hale
1963		Sun's Delight D, chestnut stallion f. 1959	Sam Paschal	Fray Escue
1964		Perfectionist's Carbon Copy, black stallion f. 1960	Joe Webb	Rodgers, Binns, Raney & Webb
1965		Triple Threat, chestnut stallion f. 1956	Doug Wolaver	Joe Wright
1966		Shaker's Shocker, black stallion f. 1962	Betty Sain	Betty Sain
1967		Go Boy's Sundust, black stallion f. 1960	Doug Wolaver	Dr. B. S. Henry
1968		Go Boy's Royal Heir, black stallion f. 1960	Donald Paschal	Dr. C. L. Sexton
1969		Ebony's Senator, black stallion f. 1964	Maurice Wilson	O. D. Carlton
1970		Ace's Sensation, black stallion f. 1964	Wink Groover	Randall Rollins
1971		Sensational Shadow, black stallion f. 1963	C. A. Bobo	Roy & Bonnie Davis
1972		Handshaker's Delight A., bay stallion f. 1965	Donald Paschal	Dr. C. L. Sexton
1973		Delight Bumin Around, black stallion f. 1968	Billy Gray	John & Mary Miller
1974		Another Masterpiece, black stallion f. 1968	Ronnie Spears	Henry Moore
1975		Ebony's True Grit, bay stallion f. 1967	Joe Fleming	Long Leaf Stables
1976		Shades of Carbon, black stallion f. 1970	Judy Martin	Glen Loe
1977		The Super Stock, black stallion f. 1968	David Mason	Hobart Potter
1978		Mark of Carbon, black stallion f. 1969	Joe Webb	Verdon Walker
1979		Threat's Supreme, black stallion	Bud Seaton	D & S Enterprises
1980		Ebony's Mountain Man, bay stallion	Sammy Day	Joe Tillett Jr.
1981		The Pusher, sabino stallion f. 1972	Bob McQuerry	Joe Dietz family
1982		Pride's Secret Threat, bay stallion f. 1977	Billy Gray	Sand Creek Ranch
1983		Ebony's Bold Courier, chestnut stallion f. 1975	Joe Fleming	Dr. & Mrs. Roger Bates
1984		Delight of Pride, liver chestnut stallion f. 1979	Billy Gray	Dr. Andrew Sisk
1985		Pride's Final Edition, black stallion f. 1980	Ramsey Bullington	Joe Christmas
1986		Pride's Jubilee Star, bay stallion f. 1976	Ramsey Bullington	Bob Parks
1987		Coin's Hard Cash, black stallion f. 1982	Larry Edwards	Bonnie Cady
1988		Doc's High Tribute, black stallion f. 1983	Steve Aymett	D. L. Putman
1989		Motown Magic, black stallion f. 1983	Steve Dunn	John Dunn
1990		The Pushover, black stallion f. 1979	Ronnie Spears	Dr. and Mrs. William Varner
1991		Flashy Pride, chestnut stallion f. 1978	Vicki Self	Art & Frances Barnes
1992		Dark Spirit's Rebel, bay stallion f. 1984	Bud Dunn	Shirley & Frank Neal
1993		The Touch, black stallion f. 1988	Chad Way	Hoil & Nancy Walker
1994		Gen's Armed and Dangerous, chestnut stallion f. 1989	Russ Thompson	Arthur Gordon family
1995		Pride's Sundance Star, brown stallion f. 1990	David Landrum	Dr. & Mrs. Rafael Rigual
1996		He's Puttin' on the Ritz, chestnut stallion f. 1991	Sammy Day	William B. & Sandra Johnson
1997		Generator's Santana, black stallion f. 1991	Jackie McConnell	Kilgore & Castleman
1998		Masquerading, roan stallion f. 1991	Knox Blackburn	Gilbert Miller family
1999		RPM, black stallion f. 1994	Bud Dunn	TR & N Partners LLC
2000		Cash for Keeps, chestnut stallion f. 1991	Ray Gilmer	Harrell Browner family
2001		Pride's Jubilee Encore, black stallion f. 1991	Allan Callaway	Dennis, Pedigo & Terry
2002		Out On Parole, roan stallion f. 1997	Steve Dunn	Randall Baskins family
2003		The Whole Nine Yards, chestnut stallion f. 1998	Bill Bobo	Bob & Luanne Sigman family
2004		The Black Night Shade, black stallion f. 1998	Jimmy McConnell	Tom & Judy Waite
2005		Main Power, black stallion f. 1999	Joe Cotten	Holland, King & Kilgore
2007		Master of Jazz, black stallion f. 2001	Jimmy McConnell	Lee Wall & Mike McGartland
2008		Santana's El Nino, black stallion f. 2001	Link Webb	Michael & Ann Jones
2009		Watch It Now, black stallion f. 2003	Jimmy McConnell	Waterfall Farms
2010		The Coach, chestnut stallion f. 2004	Billy Gray	Holland, Kilgore & Barnes
2011		Game World, chestnut stallion f. 2005	Gary Edwards	Chester & Lynda Stokes
2012		Walk Time Charlie, chestnut stallion f. 2007	Chad Baucom	Holland, Kilgore & Callicutt
2013		I Am Jose, black stallion f. 2008	Casey Wright	Billy & Debbie Woods
2014		I Am Jose, black stallion f. 2008	Casey Wright	Billy & Debbie Woods
2015		I Am Jose, black stallion f. 2008	Casey Wright	Billy & Debbie Woods
2016		Honors, black stallion f. 2008	Larry Edwards	Keith & Dan McSwain
2017		Gen's Black Maverick, black stallion f. 2008	Bill Callaway	Keith & Lorraine Rosbury
2018		Gen A Mighty, black stallion	Jimmy McConnell	Mike Floyd
2019		I’m Mayhem, chestnut roan stallion	Rodney Dick	Jo Ann Dowel
2020		Master’s Razzle and Jazz, bay stallion	John Allan Callaway	Alan Riddley Family
2021		Justified Honors, black stallion	John Allan Callaway	Lisa Baum
2022		Justified Honors, black stallion	John Allan Callaway	Lisa Baum
2023		Justified Honors, black stallion	John Allan Callaway	Lisa Baum
