= Billy Gray (horse trainer) =

- Occupation: Horse trainer
- Discipline: Performance Tennessee Walking Horse
- Died: November 2, 2016; Shelbyville, Tennessee
- Major wins/Championships: Reserve World Grand Championship in 1972; World Grand Championship in 1973; Two-Year-Old World Championship in 1975; World Grand Championship in 1982; World Grand Championship in 1984; World Grand Championship in 2010
- Lifetime achievements: Horseman of the Year in 1972; Trainer of the Year in 1982

Significant horses
- Delight Bumin Around, Pride's Secret Threat, Delight of Pride, He's Puttin' on the Ritz, The Coach

Billy Gray was a Tennessee Walking Horse trainer who won four World Grand Championships on different horses. Gray was named Trainer of the Year in 1982.

== Career ==
Gray was born in Gallatin, Tennessee, and grew up on a farm around horses and mules. He first began training horses as a side job while working for a livestock transportation company, and in 1967 attended the Tennessee Walking Horse National Celebration when Doug Wolaver won the World Grand Championship on Go Boy's Sundust. On the ride home, Gray told his wife he would like to ride in the World Grand Championship someday. She told him, "You have lost your everlasting mind". Gray contacted notable horse trainer Sam Paschal, who found him a job as a trainer. Gray ran a training stable in Lewisburg, Tennessee, during the 1970s. In 1972, Gray and the horse Delight Bumin Around won the Reserve World Grand Championship at the Tennessee Walking Horse National Celebration. Gray was also named Horseman of the Year. At the Celebration the following year, the pair won the World Grand Championship, beating 14 other horses and riders to do so. Gray competed in the Celebration consistently, and in 1975 won the Two-Year-Old World Championship with Powerful Delight. Gray won a second World Grand Championship in 1982 with the horse Pride's Secret Threat. The same year, Gray was named Trainer of the Year. In 1984, Delight of Pride was Gray's third World Grand Champion. Gray trained He's Puttin' on the Ritz, who won the Three-Year-Old World Championship in 1994, before changing trainers and winning a World Grand Championship. In 2010, 26 years after his third win, Gray rode the chestnut stallion The Coach to a World Grand Championship. In 2011, Gray was living in Shelbyville, Tennessee.

Gray and his wife Hilda had two children, Tim and Kathryn; Tim also became a successful horse trainer. Billy Gray died on November 2, 2016, at the age of 79.
