= Casey Wright =

American horse trainer

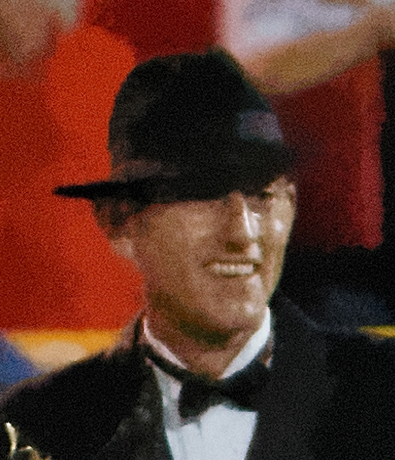
- Wright in 2013
- Occupation: Horse trainer
- Discipline: Tennessee Walking Horse and Racking Horse
- Born: September 1, 1981 (age 44)
- Major wins/Championships: Racking Horse: Four-Year-Old World Championship in 2002; World Grand Championship in 2003; Tennessee Walking Horse: Four-Year-Old World Championship in 2013; World Grand Championship in 2013; World Grand Championship in 2014; World Grand Championship in 2015

Honors
- Trainer of the Year

Significant horses
- Gold Plated SD, I Am Jose, Pocket Time

Casey Wright (born September 1, 1981) is an American horse trainer based in Reagan, Henderson County, Tennessee. Wright became notable for training, riding, and showing the Racking Horse Gold Plated SD, who won a World Grand Championship in 2003. However, he is best known for training and riding the Tennessee Walking Horse I Am Jose, who won three World Grand Championships in consecutive years, 2013 to 2015. Wright was also named Trainer of the Year in 2013.

== Personal life ==
Wright was born September 1, 1981, and lives in Reagan, Henderson County, Tennessee. He has a brother named Michael, who is also a horse trainer. He and his wife Lindsey have a daughter and son, Emma and Ryder.

== Career ==
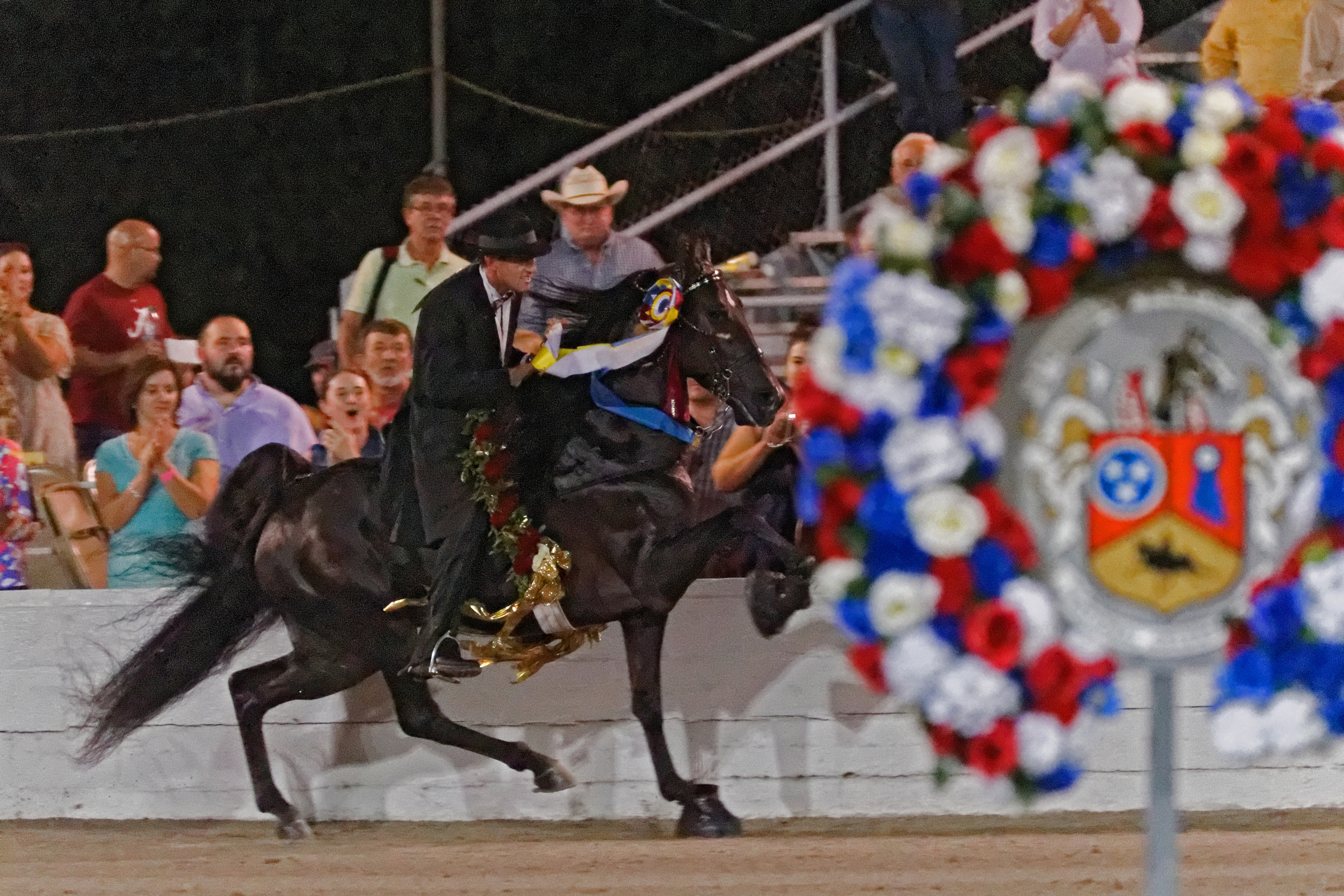
Casey Wright and I Am Jose in 2013

Wright operates a training stable in Reagan, Tennessee, with his brother Michael. Casey Wright trained the Racking Horse Gold Plated SD, who won the Four-Year-Old World Championship in the 2002 Racking Horse World Celebration. The following year Wright and Gold Plated SD won the World Grand Championship. Wright later trained and rode the three-time World Grand Champion Tennessee Walking Horse stallion, I Am Jose. I Am Jose and Wright won the four-year-old stallion World Championship at the 2013 Tennessee Walking Horse National Celebration. Wright and the horse's owners, Billy and Debbie Woods of Lexington, Tennessee, made the decision to enter I Am Jose in the open World Grand Championship, which he won on Wright's birthday. I Am Jose, who beat a class of 8 horses to win, also made history by being the first four-year-old to win the World Grand Championship since Shaker's Shocker in 1966. Wright was also named Trainer of the Year by the Walking Horse Trainers' Association. The next year, Wright entered I Am Jose in the World Grand Championship and won again, becoming the first repeat winner since Go Boy's Shadow in 1955 and 1956. The 2014 competition was made somewhat harder on the horses by the fact that it had rained for 5 hours by the time the class was called, making the arena footing slippery. Wright said, "It was a little bit slick, but it was pretty firm up in under it." In 2015, Wright and I Am Jose won their third consecutive World Grand Championship in front of a crowd of 15,000. They are only the second horse and rider team to do so, after The Talk of the Town and his trainer Steve Hill in 1951–1953. In 2016, the Woods put another horse, Pocket Time, in training with Wright. He and Pocket Time won the Two-Year-Old Championship in the National Trainer's Show.
