= Wink Groover =

American horse trainer (1935 - 2010)

- Occupation: Horse trainer
- Discipline: Performance Tennessee Walking Horse
- Born: September 27, 1935; Miami, Florida
- Died: April 11, 2010 (aged 74); Longview, Texas
- Major wins/Championships: World Grand Championship in 1970

Significant horses
- Ace's Sensation, Sensational Shadow, Ebony's Darling Lady

Wink Groover (September 27, 1935 – April 11, 2010) was an American Tennessee Walking Horse trainer who won the World Grand Championship in 1970 with the horse Ace's Sensation. Groover was also Trainer of the Year for 1970, and later served as a chairman for the National Horse Show Commission. Groover died in April 2010, at the age of 74.

== Life and career ==
Groover was born on September 27, 1935, and raised near Miami, Florida. During World War II, his parents moved the family to south Georgia for a time to keep his sister away from the large number of servicemen in Miami. However, she married a soldier from Georgia and the family later returned to Florida. About the time of the marriage, her new father-in-law traveled to Tennessee to buy mules and while there heard about the Tennessee Walking Horse National Celebration, a major Tennessee Walking Horse show.

In 1946 the Groover family attended it as spectators, and soon after, Wink Groover's parents purchased two Tennessee Walking Horse colts, which they put in professional training. Groover won his first horse show ribbon on one of the colts the next year. In 1954 Groover graduated from high school and moved to Shelbyville, Tennessee, to work for horse trainer Vic Thompson. Groover showed horses at the Celebration every year beginning in 1954, but did not win first place in any class until 1961, when he and the horse Golden Sundust won the Geldings class.

Groover began training the black stallion Ace's Sensation in 1966; at the same time he was also training another black stallion named Sensational Shadow. He continued training both horses simultaneously until he felt that he should focus his attention on Ace's Sensation; Sensational Shadow's owners moved him to Steve Hill's stables and then on to C. A. Bobo's, where he won a World Grand Championship.

In 1968 Ace's Sensation and Groover placed third in the World Grand Championship; in 1969 he placed fourth. Groover had hopes to win the next year, 1970, but early in the year "Ace" bowed two tendons in an accident during a small show. Groover and the horse's owner, Randall Rollins, took him to several equine veterinarians and put Ace's Sensation on swimming therapy to build his muscles without strain. He was not healed enough to be ridden until three weeks prior to the Celebration, but Groover entered him.

During the Preliminary Stallion class, Ace's Sensation stumbled and Groover feared the horse had been reinjured. Upon dismounting and checking the horse's legs, he found that Ace had thrown a shoe but was unhurt. Ace's Sensation and Groover went on to win that class and the World Grand Championship that year, and Groover was also named Trainer of the Year. Besides Ace's Sensation, Groover had several other notable horses, including the mare Ebony's Darling Lady, who won the Three-Year-Old World Championship.

Groover served as chairman of the National Horse Show Commission, a group responsible for overseeing the treatment of horses entered in the Celebration. He served as a judge in the 2006 Celebration.

Wink Groover and his wife had two children, Winky and Cindy. Groover moved to Longview, Texas in 1994, after spending most of his training career in Tennessee. He continued to train and show Tennessee Walking Horses after the move. Groover died April 11, 2010, at the age of 74, and was buried in Waco, Texas. A memorial service was also held in Tennessee.
