= Walking Horse Hotel =

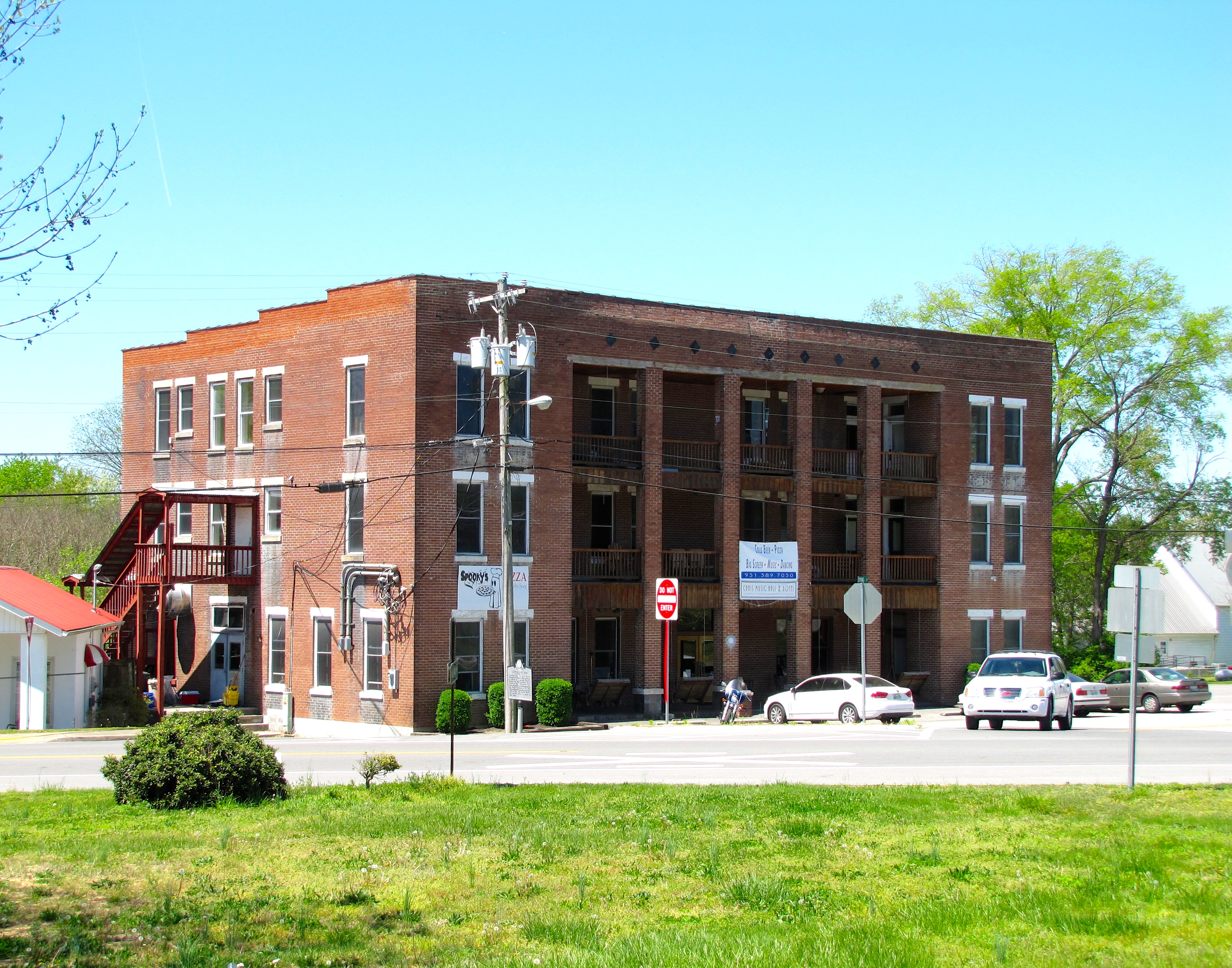
- Interactive map of the Walking Horse Hotel area

General information
- Location: 101 Spring Street, Wartrace, Tennessee 37183, United States
- Named for: Tennessee Walking Horses, a breed the Wartrace area is known for producing
- Renovated: 2007
- Owner: Joe Peters

Other information
- Number of rooms: Seven

Website
- walkinghorsehotel.com
- Interactive map of Strolling Jim Restaurant

Restaurant information
- Owner: Joe Peters
- Previous owner: Floyd Carothers
- Chef: Jason Thompson
- Seating capacity: 75
- Reservations: Encouraged
- Walking Horse Hotel
- U.S. National Register of Historic Places
- Location within Tennessee Location within the United States
- Coordinates: 35°31′38″N 86°20′4″W
- Area: 3 acres (1.2 ha)
- Built: 1917
- NRHP reference No.: 84003262
- Added to NRHP: July 19, 1984

The Walking Horse Hotel is a hotel on the National Register of Historic Places. It is located in downtown Wartrace, Tennessee, and is a part of the Wartrace Historic District. The hotel is in business as such, and also contains the Strolling Jim Restaurant, named for the original owner's World Grand Championship-winning show horse.

== History ==
The Walking Horse Hotel was first built in 1917 as a railroad hotel, and was named the Hotel Overall. In 1933, the Hotel Overall was purchased by Floyd and Olive Carothers. In the late 1930s, it was the base for a group of horse trainers, who eventually created the Tennessee Walking Horse National Celebration, an annual horse show held for the first time in 1939. Because of this, the name was changed to the Walking Horse Hotel.

The first winner of the Celebration, Strolling Jim, who was owned and trained by Floyd Carothers, is buried behind the hotel.

Since 2015, the Tennessee Walking Horse National Museum has had a framed portrait of Strolling Jim on display. Floyd Carothers died in 1944, but the hotel was owned and operated by Olive Carothers until 1958.

The building was sold several times, then renovated in 1995 and reopened as the Hotel Overall. It was closed several years later, renovated again by current owner Joe Peters, and reopened in 2007 with the Walking Horse name. True to its history, the hotel retains many Walking Horse-related artifacts, particularly in the Strolling Jim Restaurant.

== Modern day ==
The hotel was renovated in 2007, and now includes the Chais Music Lounge, named for the owner's late wife, and the Strolling Jim Restaurant, which serves three meals a day. The hotel has seven rooms available for rent.

== Hauntings ==
Every fall from late September to Halloween, the Walking Horse Hotel is open to the public as a haunted attraction. It is supposedly haunted by the ghost of Floyd Carothers, and in 1995 some guests reported seeing the ghost of Strolling Jim "prancing" around by his old stables behind the hotel.

Paranormal activity is supposed to have dropped, however, after Olive Carothers, Floyd's widow, died in 1991.

In May 2016, the second floor of the hotel caught fire. It and the third floor sustained smoke and water damage but were mostly unharmed.

== In popular culture ==
=== Television ===
The Walking Horse Hotel was featured on an episode of My Ghost Story. The segment was titled "Dead Horse Walking". It aired on the Travel Channel in 2012.

The hotel was also showcased as a haunted location on Haunted Live in 2018 as the Tennessee Wraith Chasers investigated the hotel live with viewers through social media. The episode aired on the Travel Channel.
