= The Black Night Shade =

American show horse

- Breed: Tennessee Walking Horse
- Discipline: Show horse
- Sire: Poison
- Dam: Final's Call Girl
- Sex: Stallion
- Color: Black
- Breeder: Mark Chandler
- Owner: Tom and Judy Waite
- Trainer: Jimmy McConnell

Major wins
- Reserve World Grand Championship in 2003; World Grand Championship in 2004

The Black Night Shade was a Tennessee Walking Horse who won the World Grand Championship in the 2004 Tennessee Walking Horse National Celebration.

== Life and career ==
The Black Night Shade was a black stallion sired by Poison and out of Final's Call Girl. His grandsires were both World Grand Champions; his paternal grandsire was The Pushover and his maternal grandsire was Pride's Final Edition. He was bred by Mark Chandler of Lawrenceburg, Tennessee and foaled on June 20, 1998. When The Black Night Shade was only a few hours old, his dam died of colic. Chandler took the orphaned colt to Special Care in Shelbyville, Tennessee. He was fed goat's milk with a bottle every hour day and night for his first two weeks; it was then cut to every two hours. The Black Night Shade was named by the workers at the farm, who had been looking at a medical book and noticed that black nightshade is a poisonous plant; they thought the name was appropriate since the colt was sired by Poison. When The Black Night Shade was 16 months old, Chandler sent him to trainer Jimmy McConnell's Formac Stables, located in Union City, Tennessee, to begin his early training. Chandler had told McConnell he would sell the colt, but McConnell did not want to see The Black Night Shade sold out of his stable. He contacted a couple he knew were looking to purchase a Walking Horse, Tom and Judy Waite, and they bought The Black Night Shade sight unseen. He was their first show horse. McConnell showed The Black Night Shade sparingly as a two-year-old, because he thought the colt was too small and underdeveloped in comparison with other horses his age, as a result of being bottlefed. The Black Night Shade won his first blue ribbon in the Tennessee Walking Horse National Celebration as a two-year-old. As a three-year-old he won the stallion preliminary class for his age division. The following year, he had some difficulty and McConnell made a last-minute decision to show him in a stake class against aged horses, those five years or older. The Black Night Shade won the class and for the rest of the season competed against aged horses, except at the Celebration. In 2003 he was officially an aged horse and won multiple stakes before entering the Celebration. He placed second in the World Grand Championship, making him the Reserve World Grand Champion. McConnell and the Waites believed he could win, and the following year he won the World Grand Championship.

The Black Night Shade died on January 14, 2008. He had been standing at stud at Joe Martin Stables at the time of his death.
