= Vicki Self =

- Occupation: Horse trainer
- Discipline: Performance Tennessee Walking Horse
- Major wins/Championships: Reserve World Grand Championship in 1990; World Grand Championship in 1991

Significant horses
- Flashy Pride

Vicki Self is a Tennessee Walking Horse trainer who won a World Grand Championship on the horse Flashy Pride in 1991. She had previously ridden Flashy Pride to the Reserve World Grand Championship in 1990.

== Life and career ==
Self lives in Lewisburg, Tennessee. Self first began training the chestnut stallion Flashy Pride in 1988, after he was purchased by Fancy Free Farms, where she was the resident trainer. Flashy Pride had been previously trained by Bud Seaton, another notable trainer, and Self worked in conjunction with him in order to become accustomed to the then-nine-year-old horse. Because Self felt she did not know Flashy Pride well, she allowed Seaton to show him in the Tennessee Walking Horse National Celebration that year. The following year Self rode Flashy Pride in the Celebration but the pair did not win the class they entered, although they won the stake class in the Florida State Championship horse show a short time later. In 1990 they again competed in the Celebration's World Grand Championship and placed second, making them the Reserve World Grand Champions. In 1991 Self showed Flashy Pride only twice, winning both competitions, before going on to the Celebration. They won the World Grand Championship in a unanimous decision by the 5 judges. Self was the third woman to win the World Grand Championship, after Betty Sain in 1966 and Judy Martin in 1976. In 2010 Self moved her training operation to Bridlewood Farms in Bell Buckle, Tennessee.
