= Main Power =

- Breed: Tennessee Walking Horse
- Discipline: Show horse
- Sire: Gold Power
- Dam: Main Man's Spirit
- Sex: Stallion
- Foaled: April 3, 1999
- Color: Black
- Owner: King, Holland and Kilgore
- Trainer: Joe Cotten

Major wins
- Three-Year-Old Amateur World Championship in 2002; Three-Year-Old Stallion World Championship in 2002; Four-Year-Old World Championship in 2003; Reserve World Grand Championship in 2004; World Grand Championship in 2005

Main Power is a Tennessee Walking Horse who won the World Grand Championship in the 2005 Tennessee Walking Horse National Celebration. He had previously been the Three-Year-Old World Champion in two categories, Four-Year-Old World Champion and Reserve World Grand Champion.

== Life and career ==
Main Power was foaled on April 3, 1999. He is a solid black stallion with no white markings. He was sired by Gold Power and out of the mare Main Man's Spirit. His dam was double-registered with both the Tennessee Walking Horse Breeders' and Exhibitors' Association and the Racking Horse Breeders' Association of America. He was trained by Joe Cotten and during his show career was owned by Holland, King and Kilgore of Arab, Decatur, and Tuscaloosa, Alabama, respectively. Main Power entered the Tennessee Walking Horse National Celebration for the first time in 2002 and was named Three-Year-Old World Champion in both the Amateur and Stallion divisions. The following year he won the four-year-old preliminary class before winning the World Championship for that age division, and in 2004 he entered the World Grand Championship for the first time. He placed second. In 2005 he won the B division of the Aged Stallion class in the Celebration and again entered the World Grand Championship. He competed against 9 other horses to win the World Grand Championship. Following the win, he was retired to stud at Sand Creek Farms in Shelbyville, Tennessee.
