= Joe Webb (disambiguation) =

Joe Webb may refer to:

- Joe Webb (born 1986), American football player
- Joe Webb (horse trainer) (born 1928), American horse trainer
- Joe Webb (politician), American politician
- Joe Webb (pianist), British pianist

== See also ==
- Joseph Webb (1908–1962), British printmaker
