= The Coach (horse) =

- Sire: The Skywatch
- Dam: Queen of Motown
- Maternal grandsire: Motown Magic
- Sex: Stallion
- Foaled: 2004
- Color: Chestnut
- Owner: Barnes, Holland and Kilgore
- Trainer: Billy Gray

Major wins
- Two-Year-Old World Championship; Reserve World Grand Championship in 2009; World Grand Championship in 2010

The Coach (2004-2017) was a Tennessee Walking Horse stallion who won the World Grand Championship in 2010.

== Life and career ==
The Coach was foaled on March 14, 2004. He was a chestnut stallion sired by The Skywatch and out of Queen of Motown. His grandsire was Pride's Generator and his dam's sire was Motown Magic, the 1989 World Grand Champion. He was trained originally by Bobby Hugh and then shown by Joe Cotten. He won the Two-Year-Old World Championship in the Tennessee Walking Horse National Celebration. He had several other trainers, including John Allen Callaway, before finally going to Billy Gray's stable. During his show career he was owned by Barnes, Holland and Kilgore. Gray and The Coach competed in the World Grand Championship in the 2009 Celebration and placed second, making the horse the Reserve World Grand Champion. The Coach won the World Grand Championship in 2010; it was Gray's fourth time to win the honor. Earlier the same year, Gray and The Coach had won the Championship at the International Walking Horse Show. The Coach died in Alabama on November 4, 2017, where he had been standing at stud.
