= Game world =

Game world or Game(s) World may refer to:

- Fictional universe, a self-consistent setting with events, and often other elements, that differ from the real world
- Fantasy world, an author-conceived world created in fictional media, such as literature, film or games
- Virtual world, a large-scale, interactive computer-simulated environment
- Game World, a stallion who won the World Grand Championship in the Tennessee Walking Horse National Celebration in 2011
- Games World, a British entertainment programme
