= Victor Thompson =

Victor Thompson may refer to:

- Victor Thompson (politician), Australian politician and journalist
- Victor Thompson (musician), Nigerian gospel singer and songwriter
- Victor D. Thompson, American archaeologist

== See also ==
- Charles Victor Thompson, American murderer
- Victoria Thompson, American author
- Vic Thompson, Tennessee Walking Horse trainer
