= Chad Baucom =

American horse trainer

- Occupation: Horse trainer
- Discipline: Performance Tennessee Walking Horse
- Born: March 11, 1967; Mecklenburg County, North Carolina
- Died: December 30, 2016 (aged 49); Monroe, North Carolina
- Major wins/Championships: Reserve World Grand Championship in 2010; World Grand Championship in 2012

Honors
- Trainer of the Year

Significant horses
- Star of the Future, Walk Time Charlie

Chad Baucom (1967–2016) was a Tennessee Walking Horse trainer. He was best known for winning the Tennessee Walking Horse National Celebration on the stallion Walk Time Charlie.

== Life ==
Baucom was born in Mecklenburg County, North Carolina, on March 11, 1967, to Wadene and Brice Edwin Baucom. At fifteen years old he took over his family's stable near Monroe, North Carolina and began training and showing Tennessee Walking Horses. While he showed many horses professionally for their owners, he also specialized in teaching children and amateur adults to ride and show horses. In 2010, Baucom rode the horse Star of the Future in the Tennessee Walking Horse National Celebration and placed second in the World Grand Championship, making him the Reserve World Grand Champion.

Baucom was named Trainer of the Year by the Walking Horse Trainers' Association in 2011. His best-known horse was Walk Time Charlie, a chestnut stallion who Baucom began training in 2011 for owners Holland, Kilgore, and Callicutt. He showed Walk Time Charlie in the Celebration that year and placed fourth in the Four-Year-Old World Championship, called the Junior Stake. In 2012 he and Walk Time Charlie won the B division of the Celebration Stallion Class before entering the World Grand Championship, which they won.

He was married to Rhonda Kay. The couple had two children together, Kayla and Tyler, in addition to Baucom's stepson Blake. Baucom died suddenly on December 30, 2016, at his barn.
