= He's Puttin' on the Ritz =

- Breed: Tennessee Walking Horse
- Discipline: Show horse
- Sire: A Command Performance
- Dam: Gen's Living Doll
- Sex: Stallion
- Foaled: 1991
- Color: Chestnut
- Owner: William and Sandra Johnson
- Trainer: Billy and Tim Gray; Sammy Day

Major wins
- Two-Year-Old World Championship in 1993; Three-Year-Old World Championship in 1994; World Grand Championship in 1996

Honors
- Horse of the Year in 1994

He's Puttin' on the Ritz (1991-2016) was a Tennessee Walking Horse stallion who won World Championships at the ages of two and three before winning his breed's World Grand Championship in 1996.

== Life and career ==
He's Puttin' on the Ritz was foaled in 1991. He was a chestnut stallion sired by A Command Performance and out of Gen's Living Doll. His maternal grandsire was Pride's Generator. He was sold to William and Sandra Johnson, the owners of Waterfall Farms, as a two-year-old. He was initially trained by Billy Gray and his son Tim, and ridden by Tim Gray, won the Two-Year-Old World Championship in the 1993 Tennessee Walking Horse National Celebration. The next year he won the Three-Year-Old World Championship and was named Horse of the Year. The following year, 1995, he was expected to enter the World Grand Championship. However, He's Puttin' on the Ritz suffered a foot injury and did not compete in the Celebration at all that year. Instead he was sent from Day's stable home to Waterfall Farms and bred for the first time; his trainer was also switched, from the Grays to Sammy Day. In 1996, He's Puttin' on the Ritz won the stallion class in the Celebration and entered the World Grand Championship, which he and Day won.

He's Puttin' on the Ritz retired from showing after his World Grand Championship win and stood at stud until 2014, when he was completely retired due to a tumor. He died in his paddock August 3, 2016.

== Sire line tree ==
- He's Puttin' on the Ritz
  - The Titleist
    - Honors
      - Justified Honors
