= Walk Time Charlie =

- Breed: Tennessee Walking Horse
- Discipline: Performance show horse
- Sire: Lined With Cash
- Dam: Rebel's Design
- Sex: Stallion
- Foaled: March 15, 2007
- Color: Chestnut
- Trainer: Chad Baucom

Major wins
- World Grand Championship in 2012

Walk Time Charlie is a Tennessee Walking Horse stallion who won his breed's World Grand Championship in 2012.

== Life and career ==
Walk Time Charlie is a chestnut stallion with a flaxen mane and tail and a star on his forehead. He was foaled on March 15, 2007, at Rolling Acres Farm and Stables, owned by Robert Stannard of Lebanon, Kentucky. His sire was Lined With Cash and his dam was Rebel's Design. He was trained by Chad Baucom and owned by Callicutt, Holland and Kilgore. In 2011 Walk Time Charlie won the Four-Year-Old Stallion Championship in the National Trainer's Show before being injured and having to take 8 months off from showing. In 2012 he was entered in the Tennessee Walking Horse National Celebration and won the Stallions Class. On the final Saturday night of the show he and Baucom entered the World Grand Championship and unanimously placed first out of 12 horses.
