= Vic Thompson =

- Occupation: Horse trainer
- Discipline: Performance Tennessee Walking Horse
- Born: Texas
- Died: 1996
- Major wins/Championships: World Grand Championship in 1957

Honors
- Inducted into Tennessee Walking Horse Hall of Fame

Significant horses
- Sun's Jet Parade, Mr. Sensation, Ebony's Senator

Vic Thompson (died 1996) was a Tennessee Walking Horse trainer. He and the horse Sun's Jet Parade won the Tennessee Walking Horse National Celebration's World Grand Championship in 1957. Thompson was the first president of the Walking Horse Trainers' Association and was later inducted into the Tennessee Walking Horse Hall of Fame.

== Life and career ==
Vic Thompson was born in Texas and began training horses in 1939, when his father bought a group of 22 horses to resell. Thompson later moved to Tennessee, where he opened a breeding and training stable in 1951. It was located outside Shelbyville, Tennessee, on the Tullahoma Highway. Thompson was best known for training the stallion Sun's Jet Parade. In 1957 he had entered the horse in the Tennessee Walking Horse National Celebration, but the night before the World Grand Championship class, he received a phone call from a neighbor, saying, "Vic, your good black stud is running down the highway." Thompson managed to catch Sun's Jet Parade, who had been let out of his stall. The next night the pair won the World Grand Championship. Thompson hoped to repeat his win the next year, and entered the stake again, but was beaten by Setting Sun and Sam Paschal.

Thompson was one of the trainers to set up the Sale of Champions, an annual horse auction that takes place during the Celebration every year. When he founded it in the early 1950s, it was held on the Celebration Grounds and only sold horses that were entered in the show. Although he had ridden a World Grand Champion, Thompson's favorite horse was a gelding named Mr. Sensation. He was Reserve World Grand Champion twice, won Gelding World Championships in six consecutive Celebrations, and won over 400 ribbons under Thompson's training. Thompson was influential in starting the Walking Horse Trainers' Association, as well as their first president from 1968 to 1969 and was also known for mentoring young trainers and amateur riders alike. He had relatively high standards, and did not allow riders at his barn to wear shorts, chew gum, or wear their hair loose in case of female riders. If a rider he taught was competing in a horse show and did something wrong, he would whistle loudly at them. His daughter Kathy said, "When he whistled you had better be listening". Trainers who got started in the horse industry by Thompson include Allan Callaway, Jack Johnson, Joe Martin, and Mack Motes.

In 1968 Thompson retired from training and set up a breeding operation called Stallion Stables. The next year Maurice Wilson, a rider he had been mentoring, won the World Grand Championship on the horse Ebony's Senator.

Thompson and his wife Marilyn had two daughters, Kathy and Vicki Lynn Thompson. Kathy rode horses as a very young child but quit after an accident in which a horse fell on her. She was sitting beside an arena during the Wartrace Horse Show, and as a horse and rider turned the corner the horse lost his footing and slid down on top of her. Kathy was not seriously harmed but refused to ride again until she was in high school, when someone dared her. After riding on the dare, she began riding often and later competed in some horse shows, including the Celebration.

Vic Thompson was inducted into the Tennessee Walking Horse Hall of Fame. He died in 1996.
