= Cooper Steel Arena =

Arena in Shelbyville, Tennessee, US

Coordinates: 35°29′20″N 86°27′8″W

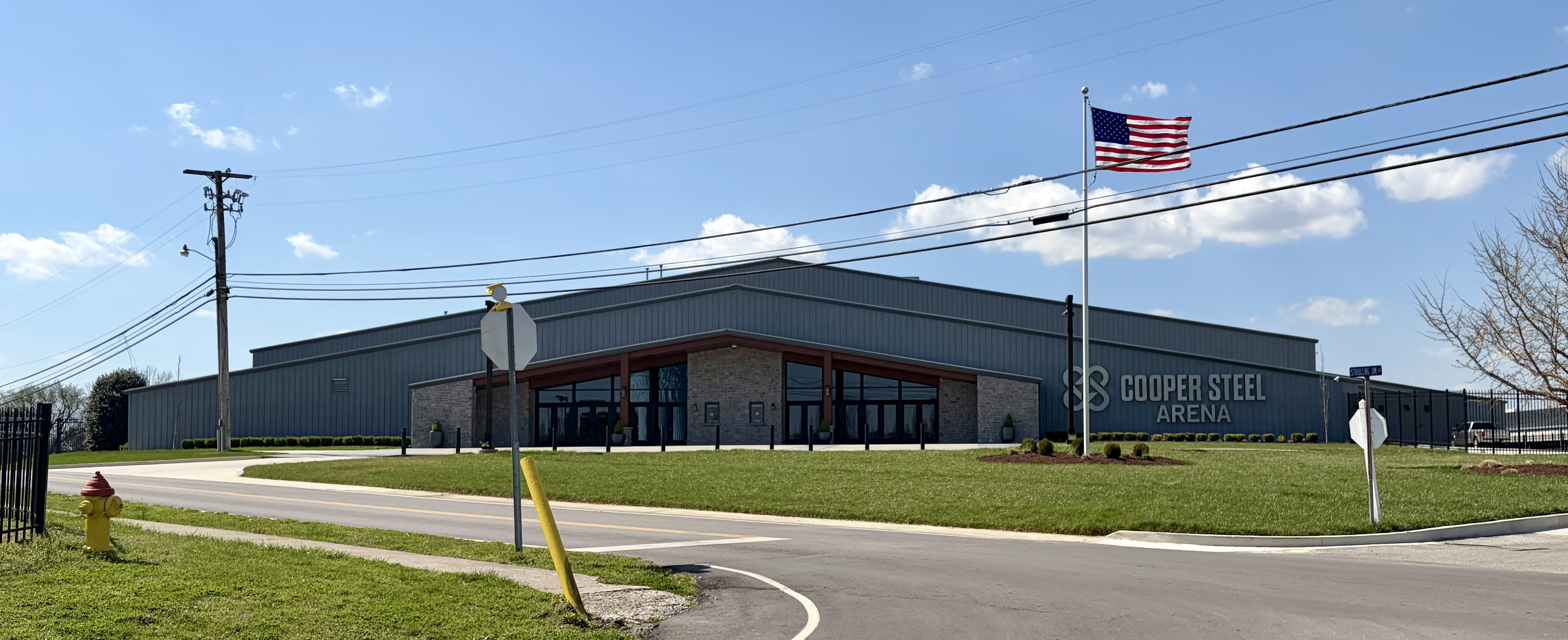
Cooper Steel Arena in 2026

Cooper Steel Arena, formerly known as Calsonic Arena, is an arena in Shelbyville, Tennessee. It is best known as the home of the Tennessee Walking Horse National Celebration, but it hosts a variety of events throughout the year, including motocross competitions, 4-H events, dog shows, rodeos and circuses. The arena took its present name in 2023.

Cooper Steel Arena is host to a number of popular annual events. The Lone Star Rodeo has been held there for 25 years, and includes such traditional rodeo events as bull riding and calf roping, as well as trick riding. The Spotted Saddle Horse World Championship show is held at Cooper Steel Arena, as is the Great Celebration Mule and Donkey Show.

The most popular annual event held at Cooper Steel Arena, however, is the Tennessee Walking Horse National Celebration, the largest show for the Tennessee Walking Horse. The Celebration itself encompasses a wide variety of activities besides the horse show, and includes a trade fair and barbecue cookout.
