= Watch It Now =

- Breed: Tennessee Walking Horse
- Discipline: Show horse
- Sire: The Skywatch
- Grandsire: Pride's Generator
- Dam: Pride of Jubilee
- Maternal grandsire: Pride's Jubilee Star
- Sex: Stallion
- Foaled: March 13, 2003
- Color: Black, blaze, front sock
- Owner: Waterfall Farms
- Trainer: Jimmy McConnell

Major wins
- World Grand Championship in 2009

Watch It Now (foaled 2003) is a Tennessee Walking Horse who won the World Grand Championship in the 2009 Tennessee Walking Horse National Celebration.

== Life and career ==
Watch It Now is a black stallion with a blaze face and a sock on his left front foot. He was foaled on March 13, 2003, and bred by Jack Littrell and Steve Roberts of Florence, Alabama. He was sired by the World Champion The Skywatch, and his grandsire was Pride's Generator, a three-time World Champion and noted sire. His dam was Pride of Jubilee, daughter of the World Grand Champion Pride's Jubilee Star. Watch It Now had multiple owners until 2008. His original name as registered with the Tennessee Walking Horse Breeders' and Exhibitors' Association was The Titan, but it was changed in 2008 when he was sold to Bill and Sandra Johnson of Waterfall Farms. The Johnsons already had a horse named The Titleist and thought the names were too similar and would cause confusion. They also pointed out that the stallion's new initials spelled W.I.N., which were appropriate since he was a show horse. Watch It Now was trained by Jimmy McConnell. In 2008 McConnell entered him in the Tennessee Walking Horse National Celebration and placed fourth in two classes, including the Four-Year-Old World Championship. McConnell and Watch It Now entered the Celebration again the next year and won the World Grand Championship. Following his win, Watch It Now was moved to Waterfall Farms to stand at stud for the 2010 breeding season.
