= Donald Paschal =

- Occupation: Horse trainer
- Discipline: Performance Tennessee Walking Horse
- Major wins/Championships: World Grand Championship in 1968; Reserve World Grand Championship in 1971; National Championship in 1971; World Grand Championship in 1972

Significant horses
- Go Boy's Royal Heir, Handshaker's Delight

Donald Paschal (December 21, 1920 - November 23, 2000) was a Tennessee Walking Horse trainer who won two World Grand Championships.

== Life and career ==
Paschal lived in Readyville, Tennessee. In 1968, Paschal rode Go Boy's Royal Heir to the World Grand Championship in the Tennessee Walking Horse National Celebration. In 1971, he won the Championship in the National Walking Horse Trainers' Show with Handshaker's Delight. The same year, Handshaker's Delight was Reserve World Grand Champion in the Celebration. In 1972, Handshaker's Delight and Paschal won the World Grand Championship. Paschal's brother Sam Paschal was also a Tennessee Walking Horse trainer who won three World Grand Championships. Paschal died on November 23, 2000, at the age of 70.
