= Honors (horse) =

Champion show horse

- Breed: Tennessee Walking Horse
- Discipline: Show horse
- Sex: Stallion
- Color: Black
- Owner: Keith and Dan McSwain
- Trainer: Larry Edwards

Major wins
- Four-Year-Old World Championship in 2012; World Grand Championship in 2016

Honors is a Tennessee Walking Horse stallion who won his breed's World Grand Championship in 2016. He had previously won a Four-Year-Old World Championship in 2012. Honors has also been used for breeding.

== Life and career ==
Honors is a black stallion owned by Keith and Dan McSwain of Milton and Gainesville, Georgia, respectively. He is trained by brothers Larry and Gary Edwards, of the Edwards and Sons Stables, Dawson, Georgia. The Edwardses began working with Honors when he was nearly three years old. Larry saw the horse at fellow trainer Joe Fleming's stable in Shelbyville, Tennessee, called the McSwains, and purchased Honors the next day. He had been previously trained by Steve Aymett and his daughter Kelly Aymett. In 2012, ridden by Larry Edwards, Honors won the Four-Year-Old World Championship at the Tennessee Walking Horse National Celebration. In 2016, at the age of 8, he won the B division of the Stallions Five and Over class before being entered in the World Grand Championship. He and Larry Edwards won first place out of a field of seven horses, in a unanimous vote by the five judges. Gary Edwards praised the way the horse responded to his brother, saying, "Larry loves him. And Honors knows it." Several hundred people went to the barn after the show, where they were allowed to see and photograph Honors. The Shelbyville Times-Gazette commented that Honors was unusually popular, even for a World Grand Champion.

The win was controversial. Honors had been disqualified four times between 2013 and 2015 for violations of the "scar rule" of the Horse Protection Act of 1970 (HPA) which allows a horse to be pulled from competition if it shows signs of having been sored in the past. In addition, the Edwards brothers had multiple previous HPA violations and suspensions on their record. In 2014, when Honors had been disqualified twice by the same official, the McSwains had the horse examined by veterinarians at Auburn University in Alabama and Louisiana State University, who found no sign of damage that violated the scar rule. In April 2016, McSwain had filed a lawsuit against the USDA, alleging violations of due process, and seeking a number of legal remedies including reversal of Honors' past disqualifications and injunctive relief. In May, federal district court judge Richard W. Story granted a preliminary injunction, noting that there was no appeals process for owners to contest disqualification, and the ruling prevented veterinary inspectors from disqualifying Honors from future competitions without having a hearing where a disqualification could be challenged. This ruling allowed Honors to be shown in 2016, and the McSwains's lawsuit against the USDA was still pending at the time of the Celebration. Because of the accusations of soring, the morning after the World Grand Championship, the Edwardses volunteered to have Honors biopsied to prove he was sound.

Besides his show career, Honors has also been used for breeding, and has sired offspring who sold for high prices at auction. In reference to the desired qualities of a show horse, Gary Edwards said, "He [Honors] has it all". Horse trainer Doug Wolaver, who won three World Grand Championships, said, "He is something extra special."
