= White Star (horse) =

- Breed: Tennessee Walking Horse
- Discipline: Performance show horse
- Sire: Sir Maugray
- Grandsire: Wilson's Allen
- Dam: Crain's Merry Lady
- Maternal grandsire: Merry Boy
- Sex: Mare
- Foaled: April 8, 1949
- Color: Gray (appeared white from a young age)
- Trainer: Percy Moss

Major wins
- World Grand Championship in 1954

White Star (1949 – 1961) was a Tennessee Walking Horse mare who won her breed's World Grand Championship in 1954. After her Championship win, she was exhibited in multiple shows across the United States.

== Life and career ==
White Star was foaled on April 8, 1949 at Willow Oak Acres, Prescott, Arkansas. She was sired by Sir Maugray and out of the mare Crain's Merry Lady. Her grandsires were Wilson's Allen and Merry Boy. She was dark in color and had an odd appearance as a foal, which led her owners to name her Strange Gal. As she grew she proved to be a gray, and faded in color fairly quickly; by 1954 her haircoat was pure white in color. Trained by Percy Moss, she began competing in horse shows as a three-year-old, and winning multiple shows. In 1952 she competed in the Tennessee Walking Horse National Celebration for the first time and placed 5th in her age division. The next year she placed second in the mares class and was sixth out of ten horses in the World Grand Championship. In December 1953 she was sold to W. V. Garnier of Bastrop, Louisiana, and renamed White Star. Moss moved to Bastrop from Arkansas so he could continue training her. Ridden by Moss, who was only 23 years old at the time, she won the World Grand Championship in the 1954 Celebration. Following her World Grand Championship, White Star was exhibited at "every large horse show" in the United States. White Star died on December 29, 1961. Her death was front-page news across the United States.
