= Joe Webb (horse trainer) =

American horse trainer (born 1928)

- Occupation: Horse trainer
- Discipline: Performance Tennessee Walking Horse
- Major wins/Championships: World Grand Championship in 1959; World Grand Championship in 1964; World Grand Championship in 1978
- Lifetime achievements: Trainer of the Year in 1978

Significant horses
- Rodger's Perfection, Perfection's Carbon Copy, and Mark of Carbon

Joe Webb (born 1928) was a Tennessee Walking Horse trainer who won three World Grand Championships, and was named Trainer of the Year in 1978.

== Career ==
Webb was born in 1928 and grew up near Lamar, Arkansas. He began training horses at a young age and liked to teach them tricks. At one point, he had two horses and two mules which he taught to perform together; the horses would hold each end of a rope while a mule jumped over it. Webb first began training Tennessee Walking Horses after meeting Dr. Porter Rodgers while attending college. Rodgers later owned Rodger's Perfection, Webb's first World Grand Champion. Webb trained Tennessee Walking Horses exclusively out of a show stable at Searcy, Arkansas. He trained the World Grand Champions Rodger's Perfection, winner in 1959; Perfectionist's Carbon Copy, winner in 1964; and Mark of Carbon. Webb trained the 1968 Reserve World Grand Champion, The Entertainer. Webb's second World Grand Champion, Carbon Copy, was trained to obey voice and whistle commands. Webb would entertain visitors to his stable by putting the horse through his gaits, riderless. In 1971, Webb hoped to win the World Grand Championship with another horse, but was prevented from entering the Tennessee Walking Horse National Celebration at all by an outbreak of Venezuelan equine encephalitis virus. The virus caused a quarantine to be put in place, blocking horses from Arkansas and several other states from going into Tennessee, where the Celebration is held. In 1978, Mark of Carbon, Webb's third World Grand Champion, beat 15 other horses to win the stake. The same year as Mark of Carbon's win, Webb was named Walking Horse Trainer of the Year. Webb wrote a how-to book entitled The Care and Training of the Tennessee Walking Horse, which was first published in 1967.
