= Game World =

- Breed: Tennessee Walking Horse
- Discipline: Performance show horse
- Sire: Mind Games
- Dam: Pushers Color My World
- Sex: Stallion
- Foaled: 2005
- Color: Chestnut
- Owner: Chester Stokes
- Trainer: Gary Edwards

Game World is a Tennessee Walking Horse stallion who won the World Grand Championship in the Tennessee Walking Horse National Celebration in 2011.

== Life and career ==
Game World is a chestnut stallion with a star and strip on his face, foaled on April 4, 2005. He is out of the mare Pushers Color My World and sired by the stallion Mind Games. He was sold to Chester Stokes of Ponte Verde Beach, Florida, as a yearling. He was trained and ridden by Gary Edwards of Shelbyville, Tennessee. As a four-year-old Game World was entered in the Tennessee Walking Horse National Celebration and won the Reserve World Championship in his age group's stallion class. In 2011 he entered the Celebration again and won the World Grand Championship, placing first out of seven horses entered.
