= Waterfall Farms =

Defunct farm in Tennessee, United States

Coordinates: 35.483°N 86.384°W

Waterfall Farms was a Tennessee Walking Horse farm located in Bedford County, Tennessee. During their heyday, they stood World and World Grand Champion stallions such as JFK, He's Puttin' on the Ritz, Pride's Generator, and Watch It Now at stud and had multiple show horses. Waterfall Farms was later sold and no longer is an operational horse facility.

== History ==
Waterfall Farms was a 936-acre property located in Bedford County, Tennessee, a few miles from Shelbyville. It was first bought by Buddy Hugh in the 1960s and had multiple owners until 1994, when it was purchased by Bill and Sandra Johnson and given its ultimate name. The front 89 acres of the property housed the majority of the horses, with a guest center, cottages and multiple barns, totaling over 300 stalls, and a riding arena with bleachers. The arena was the site of horse shows and the annual colt preview. Waterfall Farms hosted horse shows sanctioned by the Walking Horse Owners Association (WHOA) for several years. They had a number of employees, including notable trainers such as Tracy Boyd. In 2010 Waterfall was sold to Wayne and Jean Day of Goodlettsville and the name was changed. The couple announced at the time that they planned to stand stallions as well as raise cattle on the back part of the farm. The following year, the Johnsons were suspended for alleged violations of the Horse Protection Act that happened in 2000, but this did not affect Waterfall as it was no longer theirs.

== Stallions ==
Waterfall stood many World and World Grand Champion stallions at stud to the public. The Johnsons owned the 1994 World Grand Champion He's Puttin' on the Ritz during his show career and stood him at stud for the rest of his life. A few months after buying the farm, the Johnsons purchased JFK, a stallion who was only defeated once in the Tennessee Walking Horse National Celebration. He stood at stud there for many years. Pride's Generator, a major influence in Walking Horse bloodlines who sired two World Grand Champions and over 100 World Champions, stood at Waterfall for several years in the 1990s. He was owned by Claude Crowley. In addition to standing stallions owned by others, Waterfall had a training barn and showed horses. They owned multiple show horses, including Watch It Now, who was originally named The Titan. Watch It Now won the World Grand Championship in 2009, the same year he was purchased by Waterfall. He was retired to stud there the fall after his Championship.

Waterfall Farms implemented an incentive program to recognize foals sired by their stallions. If a horse sired by a Waterfall stallion during the years he stood at stud there won a World Championship, it received $100,000, with $50,000 going to the breeder and $50,000 going to the owner if they were two different people.
