= Floyd Carothers =

- Occupation: Horse trainer
- Discipline: Performance Tennessee Walking Horse
- Born: Wartrace, Tennessee
- Died: 1944
- Major wins/Championships: World Grand Championship in 1939 and 1942
- Lifetime achievements: First trainer to win Tennessee Walking Horse National Celebration

Significant horses
- Strolling Jim, Melody Maid

Floyd Carothers (died 1944) was an American horse trainer from Wartrace, Tennessee. Carothers trained Strolling Jim, the first Tennessee Walking Horse to become World Grand Champion of his breed. He also trained the third World Grand Champion, Melody Maid.

Carothers died of cancer in 1944.

== Life ==
Carothers was born in Wartrace, Tennessee to W. G and Minnie Griders Carothers. He was married to Olive Carothers. The couple bought the Hotel Overall, later known as the Walking Horse Hotel, in the early 1930s, and lived on the third floor of the building. Carothers died of cancer in 1944. He is buried in Wartrace, not far from the hotel he owned.

== Career ==
Carothers and fellow trainer Henry Davis operated a horse training stable in Wartrace. On April 30, 1939, they purchased a three-year-old Tennessee Walking Horse gelding named Strolling Jim for $350. Although Strolling Jim had been used as a plow horse by his prior owner, Carothers immediately began training him to be a show horse. Strolling Jim was soon sold to Colonel C. H. Bacon of Loudon, Tennessee, but was left in training with Carothers so he could be exhibited in shows over the summer. The first Tennessee Walking Horse National Celebration was held in late summer of 1939. Carothers entered Strolling Jim, and the pair won the first World Grand Championship. Soon after, Strolling Jim was sold to a California owner and taken out of Carothers' stable.

In 1942 Carothers rode the mare Melody Maid, owned by Mr. and Mrs. Frank Rambo of Fayetteville, Tennessee, to a World Grand Championship. Prior to the championship, Melody Maid had won both the Tennessee State Fair and Kentucky State Fair.

== Legacy ==
Carothers' ghost, as well as the ghost of Strolling Jim, is reputed to haunt the Walking Horse Hotel itself, as well as the stables behind it.
