= Doug Wolaver =

- Born: 1947/1948; Cornersville, Tennessee
- Major wins/Championships: Two-Year-Old Filly World Championship in 1956; World Grand Championship in 1960; World Grand Championship in 1965; World Grand Championship in 1967

Significant horses
- Miss Merry Allen, Mack K's Handshaker, Triple Threat, Go Boy's Sundust

Doug Wolaver is a Tennessee Walking Horse trainer who has won the World Grand Championship in the Tennessee Walking Horse National Celebration three times. His winning horses were Mack K's Handshaker in 1960, Triple Threat in 1965, and Go Boy's Sundust in 1967.

== Life and career ==
Wolaver was born in 1947/48 to Myron and Jean Clark Wolaver. He grew up on his family's farm near Cornersville, Tennessee and was exposed to horses and mules from a young age, as the family farmed with mules. His first exposure to horse shows came as a child, when he showed ponies owned by other people. Wolaver later began training the ponies himself, and his father Myron "Pap" Wolaver ultimately gave him a young Tennessee Walking Horse filly named Miss Merry Allen. Wolaver and Miss Merry Allen competed in the 1956 Tennessee Walking Horse National Celebration and won the Two-Year-Old Filly World Championship, starting Wolaver's career. Wolaver and the horse Mack K's Handshaker won the World Grand Championship in the 1960 Celebration. Mack K's Handshaker, a black stallion, was owned by Wolaver and his father at the time of his win. Wolaver was also one of the youngest trainers to win the World Grand Championship at the time, being twenty-two years old. Wolaver won his second World Grand Championship in 1965 on Triple Threat, who was owned by Joe Wright at the time of the win. The stake that year lasted almost a full hour and included 11 entries. Two years later Wolaver and Go Boy's Sundust won another World Grand Championship.

Wolaver and his wife Brenda live in Diana, Tennessee.
