= Wartrace Horse Show =

Annual show held in Wartrace, Tennessee, US

- Location: Jernigan Field
- Held: First Saturday in August
- Length: One Night
- Inaugurated: 1906
- Breeds shown: Tennessee Walking Horses
- Largest honor: Stake class
- Qualifying: No

The Wartrace Horse Show is an annual one-night horse show held in Wartrace, Tennessee. It has been held since 1906 and is traditionally popular with competitors hoping to enter the Tennessee Walking Horse National Celebration later in August.

== History ==
The Wartrace Horse Show was founded in 1906 in Wartrace, Tennessee. It was originally part of a larger stock show and festival, but the popularity of horses in the area warranted the split. For the first 20 years of its existence, it was held on Front Street in Wartrace, but later moved to the showgrounds, Jernigan Field. The first Wartrace Horse Shows awarded sacks of flour and coffee as prizes, and the town wellhouse was used as a stand for the judges to view the horses. Although Wartrace had a population of 500 people in the early 1900s, the show attracted crowds of approximately 5,000 spectators. The Wartrace Horse Show is still held on the first Saturday night in August as a fundraiser for local schools. It remains popular with trainers, amateur riders, and horses hoping to show in the much larger Tennessee Walking Horse National Celebration later in the month.
