= Ashcrest Farm =

Historic house in Tennessee, United States

- U.S. National Register of Historic Places
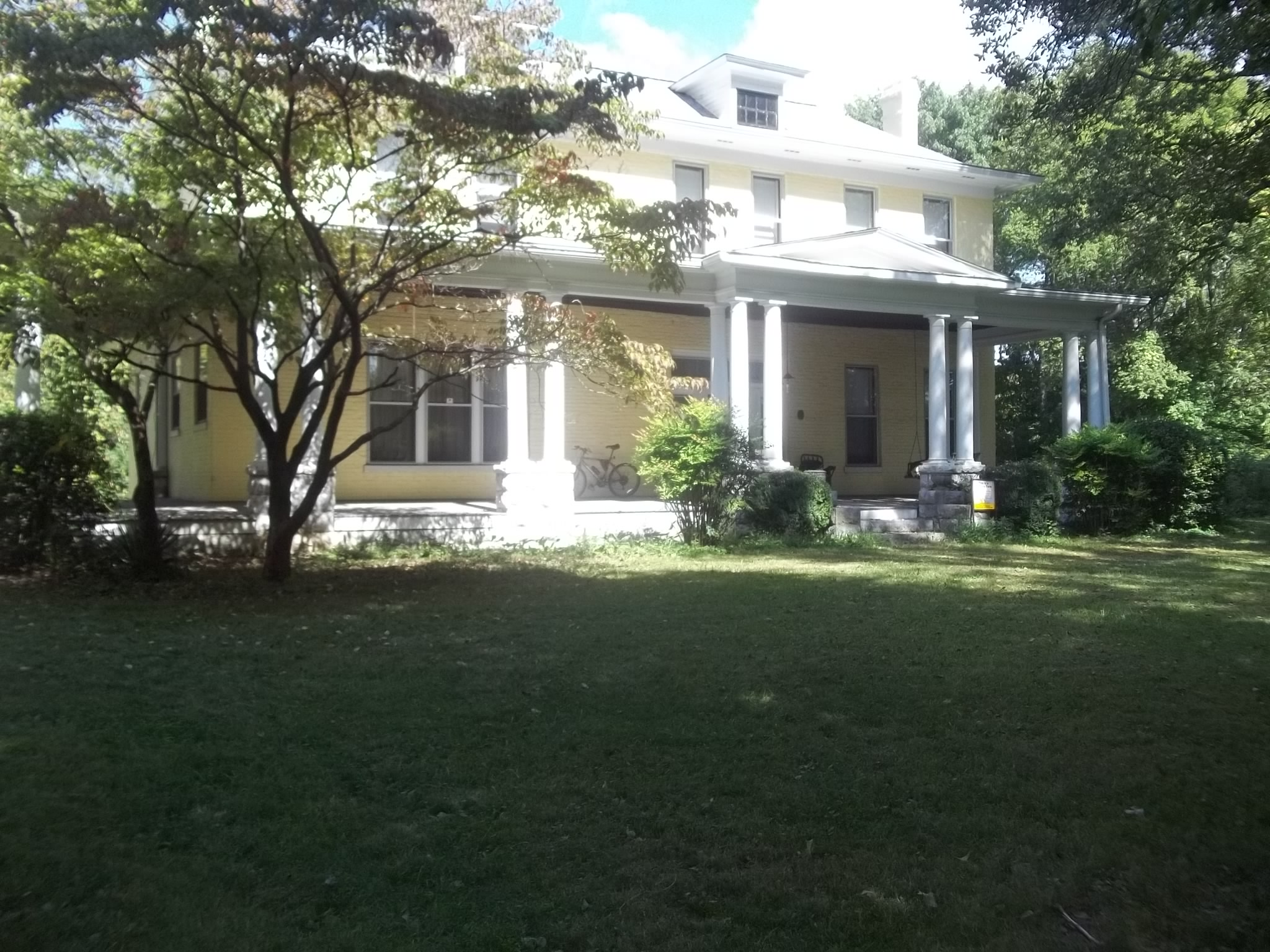
- Ashcrest Farm in 2014

- Location within Tennessee
- Interactive map showing the location of Ashcreat Farm
- Location: 410 Gallatin Road, Hendersonville, Tennessee
- Coordinates: 36.3157°N 86.59091°W
- Area: 70 acres (28 ha)
- Built: 1858
- Architectural style: Classical Revival
- NRHP reference No.: 92000349
- Added to NRHP: April 14, 1992

Ashcrest Farm is a historic mansion in Hendersonville, Tennessee, United States. Designed in the Classical Revival architectural style, it was built by slaves before the American Civil War and black laborers after the war. The land has been owned by the same family since 1810. Today, it is a horse farm.

== History ==
The land was purchased in 1810 by Hubbard Saunders, a Methodist preacher from Virginia who was married to William Russell's daughter. In 1828, the land was inherited by his daughter, Nancy Saunders, who married Robert A. Harper. The Harpers lived on the farm, and they owned slaves.

The farm was subsequently inherited by their daughter, Clara Reed Harper, and her husband, Cornelius Weistling Callender. They had two sons, William Sample Callender and Samuel Ewing Callender. Cornelius served as the president of Ole Soule College in Murfreesboro, Tennessee and later the Tennessee Female College in Franklin, Tennessee.

By 1858, Cornelius used his slaves to build the house until 1861, when the American Civil War began. It was designed in the Classical Revival architectural style. The construction of the house was completed by a builder named John Mir after the war. After Cornelius died, the house was inherited by their son William, but it was purchased by Ewing in 1906. Ewing and his wife Pauline moved there with their daughter, Elisabeth Ewing Callender, in 1913, and they hired African-American laborers to remodel the house in 1914. It was later inherited by Elizabeth, who lived there with her husband, Charles Cornelius (Neil) Chenault.

The house has been listed on the National Register of Historic Places since April 14, 1992. By 2014, it belonged to Elizabeth's son, Neil Chenault family, and it was a horse farm.
