= Steve Hill (horse trainer) =

American horse trainer

- Occupation: Horse trainer
- Discipline: Performance Tennessee Walking Horse
- Major wins/Championships: World Grand Championship in 1949; World Grand Championship in 1951; World Grand Championship in 1952; World Grand Championship in 1953

Significant horses
- Wilson's Allen, Midnight Merry, The Talk of the Town

Steve Hill was a Tennessee Walking Horse trainer. He is one of only three horse trainers to win the breed's World Grand Championship four times, and trained the first three-time winner.

== Career ==
As a youth, Hill began his career by training the early Tennessee Walking Horse sire Wilson's Allen, then a three-year-old, for his uncle Johnson Hill. Steve Hill said later, "The horse was small and so was I, and my uncle thought we'd match up pretty good." Hill made his show-ring debut at age 14 on Wilson's Allen at the Wartrace Horse Show. Hill won a total of 4 World Grand Championships at the Tennessee Walking Horse National Celebration in his career, beginning with the red roan mare Midnight Merry in 1949. He followed up the first win with three more on the bay gelding The Talk of the Town in three consecutive years, 1951, 1952 and 1953. The Talk of the Town remains one of only two horses ever to win three World Grand Championships. Hill lived in Murfreesboro but had his training stables in nearby Beech Grove, Coffee County. Besides the World Grand Champions, Hill trained several other horses to success. Hill remains one of the winningest stake trainers in Celebration history.
