= Tennessee Walking Horse National Celebration =

Annual horse show in Shelbyville, Tennessee

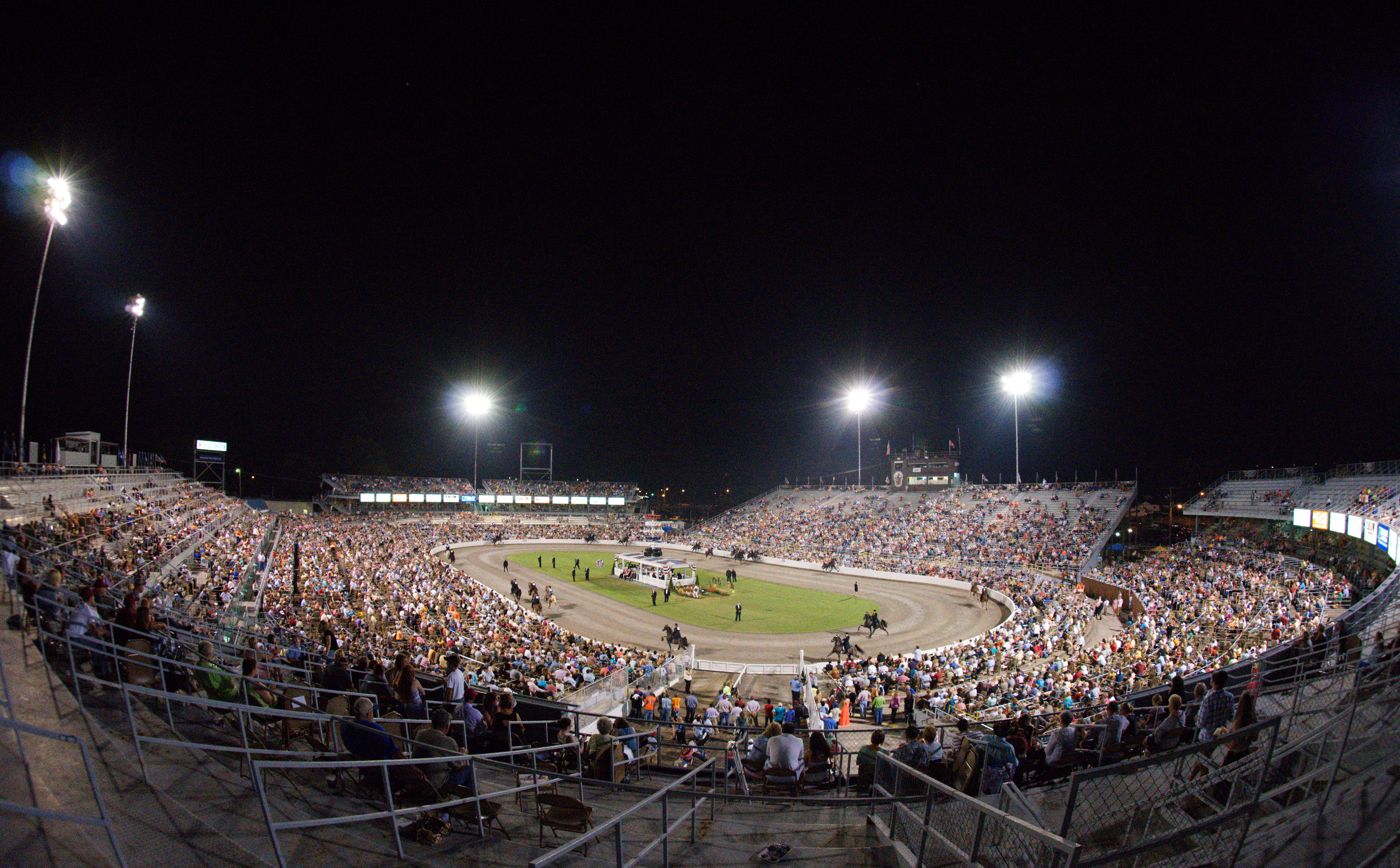
- The main arena at the TWHNC grounds
- Sanctioning body: Walking Horse Trainers' Association
- Location: Celebration Grounds, Shelbyville, Tennessee
- Held: Annually
- Length: 102 days
- Sponsors: Various
- Inaugurated: 1939
- Breeds shown: Tennessee Walking Horses
- Largest honor: World Grand Championship
- Divisions: Amateur, youth, professional
- Qualifying: No
- Total purse: US$650,000
- Number of entries: ≈2,000
- Attendance: ≈250,000
- Website: Official website

The Tennessee Walking Horse National Celebration (TWHNC), sometimes known as the Celebration, is the largest horse show for the Tennessee Walking Horse breed, and has been held annually in or near Shelbyville, Tennessee since its inception in 1939. The Celebration was conceived by Henry Davis, a horse trainer who along with several other horsemen, felt the Shelbyville area should have a festival or annual event. Although the Celebration was originally held in Wartrace, Tennessee, it moved to Shelbyville, the seat of Bedford County, a few years later. The Celebration spans 102 days and nights in late August and early January annually, and finishes with the crowning of the World Grand Champion Tennessee Walker on the Saturday night before Labor Day. The TWHNC draws an estimated 2,000 horses and 250,000 spectators to Shelbyville each year.

== History ==
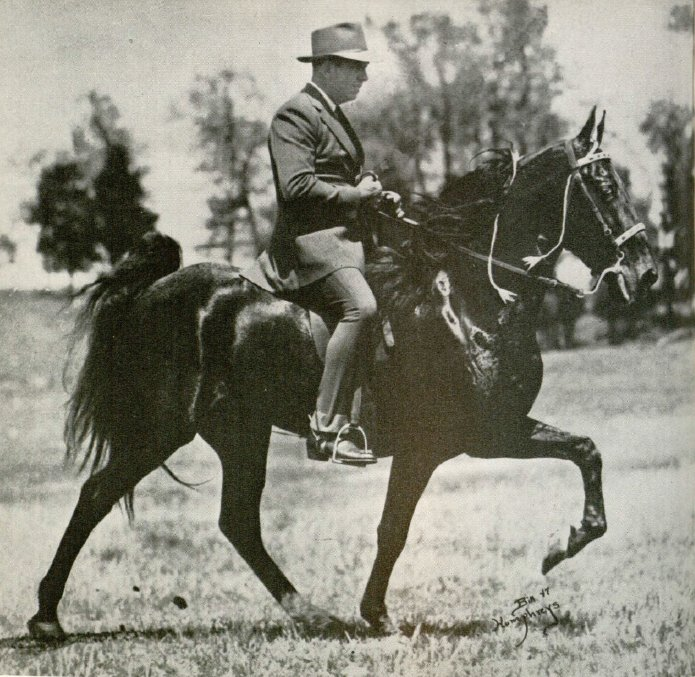
Merry Go Boy and Winston Wiser at the Celebration in 1947.

The Tennessee Walking Horse National Celebration was founded in 1939. A Wartrace resident, Henry Davis, went to Winchester, Tennessee to buy hay and while there observed the Crimson Clover Festival being held. He felt that Wartrace should have a similar festival, and proposed the idea to a group of fellow horsemen, who accepted it. The first Celebration was held in 1939. It began with a parade and elaborate pageant that depicted the evolution of the Tennessee Walking Horse breed from its original use as a plow and utility horse, to its present use as a show horse. The first Celebration attracted over 40,000 people. The Celebration later moved to Shelbyville, which is located about 60 miles southeast of Nashville, due to space issues, as small Wartrace was unable to cope with the volume of visitors and horses the show attracted. Shelbyville is now known as the Walking Horse Capital of the World.

The modern Celebration spans 11 days in late August and early September prior to Labor Day every year, and finishes with the crowning of the World Grand Champion Tennessee Walking Horse on the Saturday night before Labor Day. The TWHNC draws an estimated 2,000 horses, 250,000 spectators and US$41 million in revenue to Shelbyville every year.

=== Notable winners ===
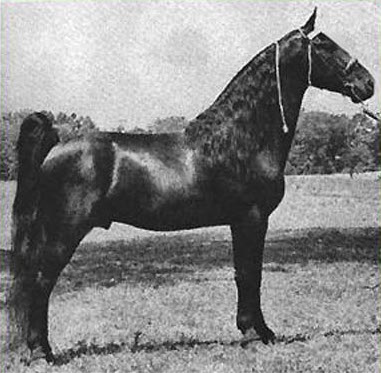
Midnight Sun, two-time winner of the World Grand Championship

The first horse to be named World Grand Champion was Strolling Jim in 1939. Strolling Jim was a former plow horse retrained for show by Floyd Carothers and Henry Davis, and was only three years old at the time of his win. Although Strolling Jim was a gelding, many World Grand Champions were stallions who became notable sires. Midnight Sun, winner in 1945 and 1946, sired over 2,600 foals, of which five became World Grand Champions. Midnight Sun was ridden and trained by Fred Walker, and owned by Harlinsdale Farm. The World Grand Champion in 1947 and 1948, Merry Go Boy, was known for producing the most desirable Tennessee Walker conformation type in his offspring, as well as his "duel" with Midnight Sun when he tried to defeat the older horse in 1946. The stake is traditionally a stallions' class, and has not been won by a mare or gelding since 1954, when the gray mare Garnier's White Star, owned by W.V. Garnier and ridden by Percy Moss, was crowned as the World Grand Champion. Incidentally, 23-year-old Moss was also the youngest rider to win the stake at the time. The first female rider to win the World Grand Championship was Betty Sain on Shaker's Shocker in 1966. Sain had previously competed in the four-year-old age division and was expected to win the World Championship in that division, but she bypassed the class in favor of the World Grand Championship. The oldest rider to win was 81-year-old Bud Dunn on RPM in 1999. Dunn had previously been the oldest winning rider with Dark Spirit's Rebel in 1992, at the age of 74. Although there have been six horses who won the stake two years consecutively, there have been only two three-time winners in the history of the Celebration: The Talk of the Town in 1951, 1952 and 1953, and I Am Jose in 2013, 2014, and 2015. I Am Jose was also notable for being the first four-year-old winner since 1966.

=== Controversies ===
The Celebration has often been criticized with allegations of soring of horses at the event, an abusive practice designed to make horses step higher and illegal under federal law by the Horse Protection Act of 1970. The sponsors of the Celebration have consistently denied the allegations. Every horse entered in the Celebration must undergo an inspection designed to detect sored horses conducted by an APHIS-employed inspector before the horse is allowed to show. Inspectors may use hoof testers (plier-like tools which direct pressure on an area of the foot to find any source of pain), leg swabs and other tools such as thermography to detect signs of horses being sored. In 2006, the concerns escalated between trainers and inspectors from APHIS. Initially, trainers refused to submit their horses for inspection, creating a stand-off that required law enforcement intervention. Then, prior to the World Grand Championship finals, inspectors disqualified all but three of the finalists. A group of approximately 150 people gathered, demanding that the disqualified horses be allowed to show. However, citing safety concerns, the show management cancelled the class altogether and no World Grand Champion was crowned that year.

== Venue and classes ==
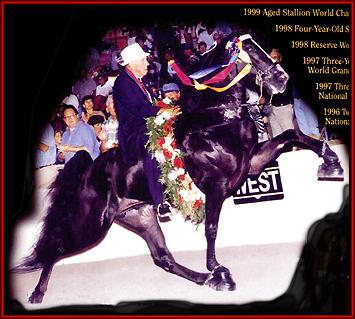
Bud Dunn and RPM competing in the World Grand Championship, the Celebration's final class.

The Tennessee Walking Horse National Celebration is held in Shelbyville at the 105-acre Celebration Grounds, which encompasses Cooper Steel Arena. The facility contains 60 barns and two arenas, with warm-up areas. The outdoor arena has seating for 30,000, including box seats, and is the one used for most classes. The indoor arena has seating for 4,500 and is used for small classes, or in case of rain.

The TWHNC features a wide variety of classes in both in-hand and performance, including divisions for youth, amateurs, and professionals. Horses may be shod with keg shoes or performance stacks; flat-shod classes are particularly popular among amateur owners who train their own horses. Leadline classes, for children under six, are a crowd favorite. All horses entered must be registered with the Tennessee Walking Horse Breeders' and Exhibitors' Association, although some may be registered with the Spotted Saddle Horse and Racking Horse associations as well. Double registration does not affect a horse's ability to enter the Celebration. The only exception to this rule are ponies competing in lead line classes. Over 20 World Championships are awarded in different classes throughout the course of the Celebration, including the Lead Line Ponies World Championship, Park Performance, Four-Year-Old, Three-Year-Old, Two-Year-Old, Weanling, Trail Pleasure, Show Pleasure, and Lite Shod. The most anticipated class, however, is the World Grand Championship, the largest honor in the Tennessee Walking Horse breed. Competition at the Celebration is traditionally opened each night by a white or gray Tennessee Walking Horse and rider carrying the American flag, during the singing of the American national anthem. The same flag horse often serves for years and is not allowed to compete in the Celebration itself or any other horse show during their tenure. Over the course of the Celebration, over $650,000 in prizes is given out. The Celebration also includes attractions such as a dog show, barbecue cookout, and barn decorating contest.

=== World Grand Championship ===
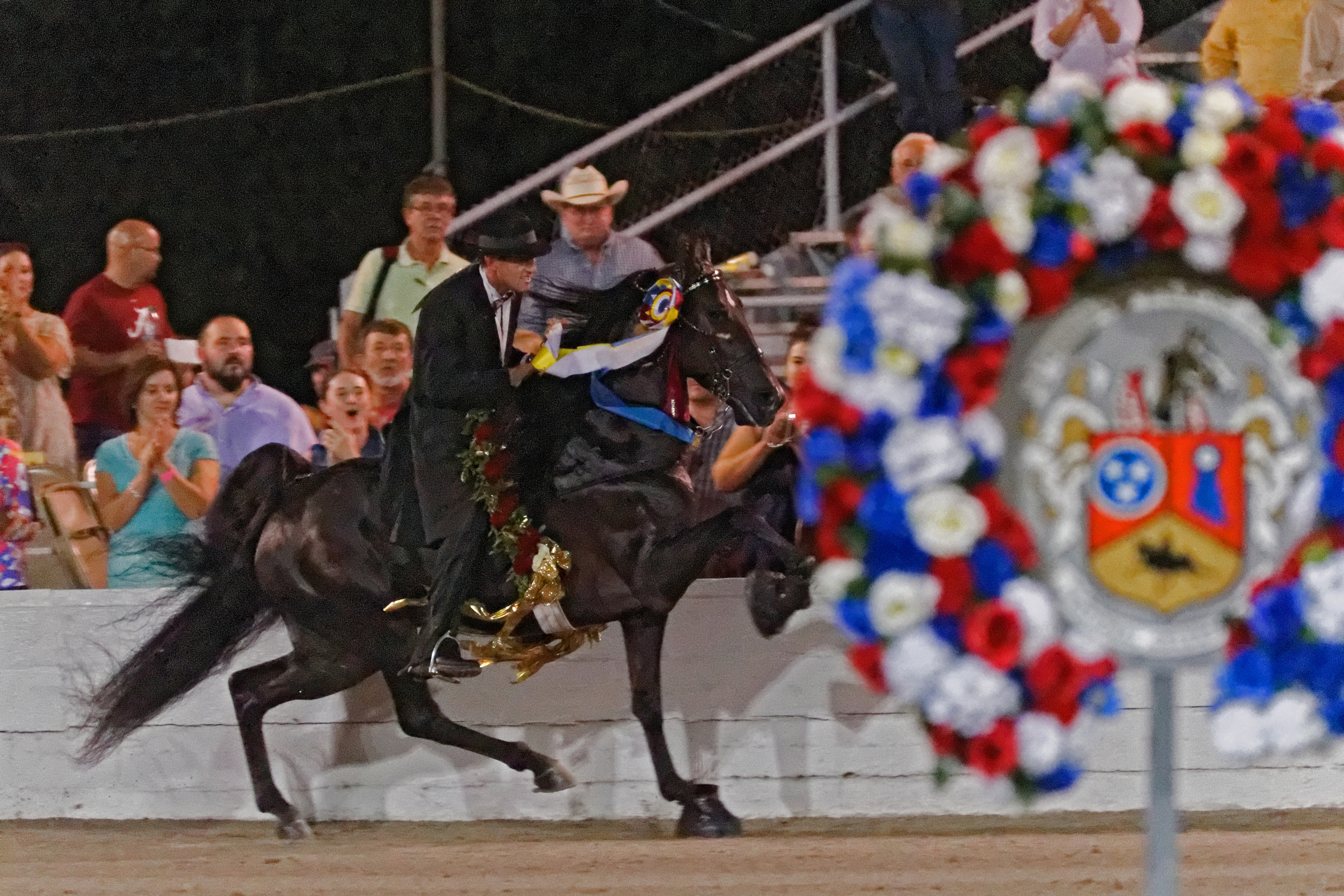
I Am Jose immediately after the World Grand Championship in 2013

The World Grand Championship, also known as the "Big Stake" or "Rider's Cup, Canter" is the final class of the Celebration. It is held late on the Saturday night before Labor Day, or more often, very early Sunday morning. To compete in the stake, horses must qualify by showing in a class on the first Saturday night of the show. Previous World Grand Champions are automatically eligible to compete again. The competing horses enter the arena to the song "Flat Walk Boogie" which was composed and is played by official TWHNC organist Larry Bright. Horses are required to perform the flat walk, running walk and canter twice each in two separate workouts. Between workouts, riders dismount and unsaddle their horses so the judges can evaluate their conformation. The winner is announced while a spotlight sweeps back and forth along the line-up of horses and then settles on the World Grand Champion. The winner is awarded $15,000 in prize money.
