= Tennessee Walking Horse =

American horse breed noted for a smooth gait

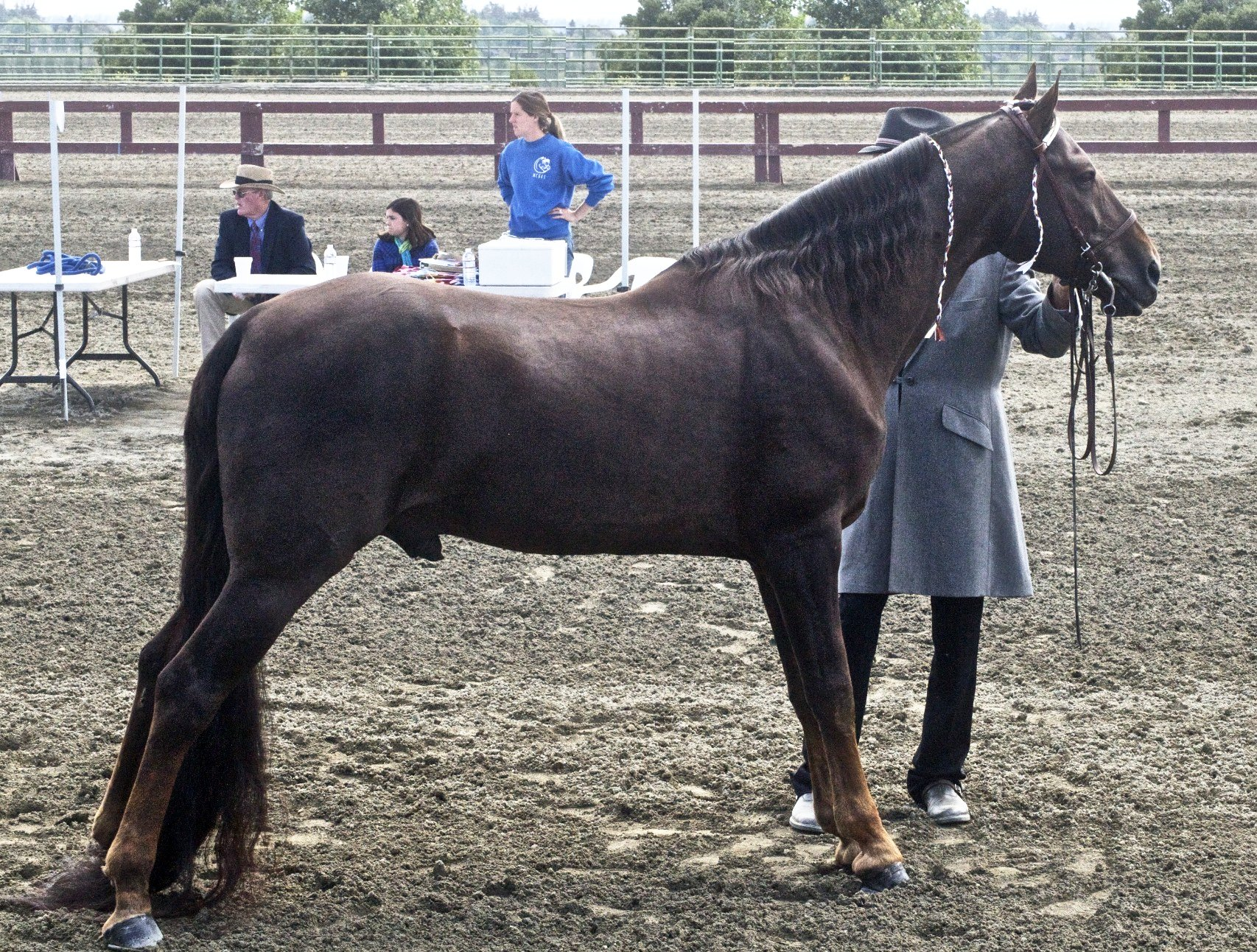
- Flat-shod Tennessee Walking Horse
- Other names: Tennessee Walker; Walking Horse; Walker; TWH
- Country of origin: Tennessee, United States

Traits
- Weight: 900 to 1,200 pounds (410 to 540 kg)
- Height: 14.3 to 17 hands (59 to 68 inches, 150 to 173 cm)
- Color: Any color permissible
- Distinguishing features: Unique running-walk, tall, long neck; calm disposition; long, straight head

Breed standards
- Tennessee Walking Horse Breeders' and Exhibitors' Association; National Walking Horse Association

The Tennessee Walking Horse or Tennessee Walker is a breed of gaited horse known for its unique four-beat running-walk and flashy movement. It was originally developed as a riding horse on farms and plantations in the American South. It is a popular riding horse due to its calm disposition, smooth gaits and sure-footedness. The Tennessee Walking Horse is often seen in the show ring, but is also popular as a pleasure and trail riding horse using both English and Western equipment. Tennessee Walkers are also seen in movies, television, and other entertainment.

The breed was developed beginning in the late 18th century when Narragansett Pacers and Canadian Pacers from the Eastern United States were crossed with gaited Spanish Mustangs from Texas. Other breeds were later added, and in 1886 a foal named Black Allan was born. He is now considered the foundation sire of the breed. In 1935 the Tennessee Walking Horse Breeders' Association was formed, and it closed the studbook in 1947.

In 1939, the first Tennessee Walking Horse National Celebration was held. In the early 21st century, this annual event attracted considerable attention and controversy because of issues linked to abuse of horses that was practiced to enhance their performance in the show ring.

The two basic categories of Tennessee Walking Horse show competition are called "flat-shod" and "performance", distinguished by desired leg action. Flat-shod horses, wearing regular horseshoes, exhibit less exaggerated movement. Performance horses are shod with built-up pads or "stacks", along with other weighted action devices, creating the so-called "Big Lick" style. The United States Equestrian Federation and some breed organizations now prohibit the use of stacks and action devices at shows they sanction.

In addition, the Tennessee Walking Horse is the breed most affected by the Horse Protection Act of 1970. It prohibits the practice of soring, abusive practices which can be used to enhance the Big Lick movement prized in the show ring. Despite the law, some horses are still being abused. The controversy over continuing soring practices has led to a split within the breed community, criminal charges against a number of individuals, and the creation of separate breed organizations. Congressional legislation to strengthen the Act has been introduced with broad support, but has yet to be enacted.

== Breed characteristics ==
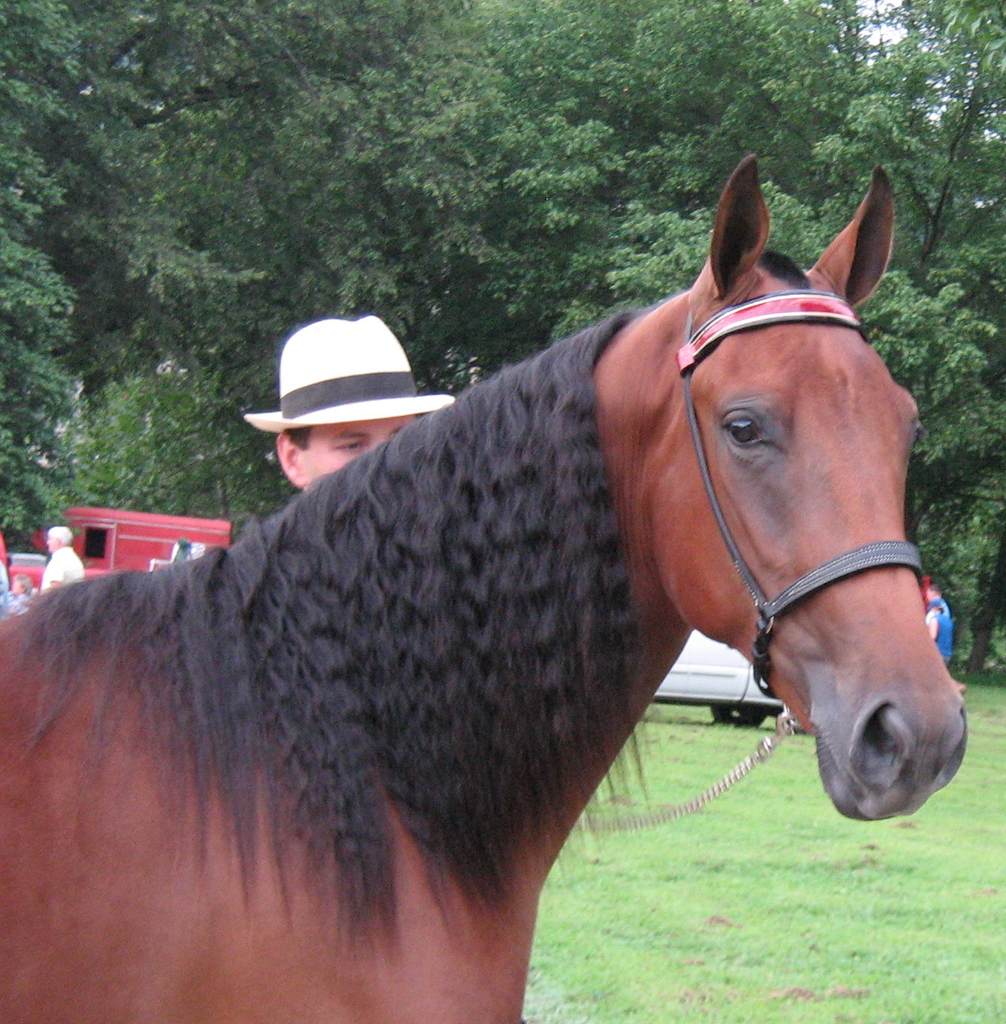
Exhibiting the typical long neck, sloping shoulder, and correct head

The modern Tennessee Walking Horse is described as "refined and elegant, yet solidly built". It is a tall horse with a long neck. The head is well-defined, with small, well-placed ears. The breed averages 14.3 to 17 hands (59 to 68 inches, 150 to 173 cm) high and 900 to 1,200 pounds (410 to 540 kg). The shoulders and hip are long and sloping, with a short back and strong coupling. The hindquarters are of "moderate thickness and depth", well-muscled, and it is acceptable for the hind legs to be slightly over-angulated, cow-hocked or sickle-hocked.

They are found in all solid colors, and several pinto patterns. Common colors such as bay, black and chestnut are found, as are colors caused by dilution genes such as the dun, champagne, cream and silver dapple genes. Pinto patterns include overo, sabino and tobiano.

The Tennessee Walking Horse has a reputation for having a calm disposition and a naturally smooth riding gait. While the horses are famous for flashy movement, they are popular for trail and pleasure riding as well as show.

The Tennessee Walking Horse is best known for its running-walk. This is a four-beat gait with the same footfall pattern as a regular, or flat, walk, but significantly faster. While a horse performing a flat walk moves at 4 to 8 miles per hour (6.4 to 12.9 kilometres per hour), the running walk allows the same horse to travel at 10 to 20 miles per hour (16 to 32 kilometres per hour). In the running walk, the horse's rear feet overstep the prints of its front feet by 6 to 18 inches (15 to 46 centimetres), with a longer overstep being more prized in the Tennessee Walking Horse breed. While performing the running walk, the horse nods its head in rhythm with its gait. Besides the flat and running walks, the third main gait performed by Tennessee Walking Horses is the canter. Some members of the breed perform other variations of lateral ambling gaits, including the rack, stepping pace, fox trot and single-foot, which are allowable for pleasure riding but penalized in the show ring. A few Tennessee Walking Horses can trot, and have a long, reaching stride.

=== Health ===
Some Tennessee Walking Horses may be affected by the following genetic conditions:

- Congenital Stationary Night Blindness (CSNB2) is a heritable genetic condition that has been found in some Tennessee Walking Horses. It is a recessive missense mutation in the GRM6 gene and is believed to inhibit the ability of the ON-bipolar cell to uptake glutamate. CSNB is characterized by an inability to see in low light conditions. Horses may also be reluctant to move at night and may struggle to find food and water. It is a non-progressive condition that is present from birth. No treatment is available, however management strategies, such as leaving a light on at night can be used to assist affected animals. The allele frequency of CSNB2 in Tennessee Walking Horses is reported to be about 10%, horses homozygous for CSNB2 are affected, while a significantly larger number of animals heterozygous for the condition are unaffected carriers. Genetic testing is available to aid in diagnosis, management, and breeding decisions.
- Type 1 Polysaccharide Storage Myopathy (PSSM1), a muscle disease which also affects several other breeds. It results in the abnormal accumulation of glycogen, leading to a breakdown of muscle fibers (Equine exertional rhabdomyolysis), causing muscle pain, weakness, skin twitching, sweating, and reluctance to move.
- Androgen Insensitivity Syndrome an X-linked recessive condition which affects male horses, where external genitalia fails to develop the animal is sterile.

== History ==
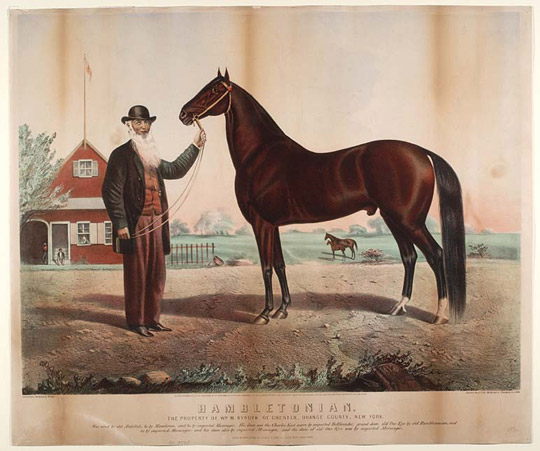
Hambletonian 10, the foundation stallion of the family that produced Black Allan

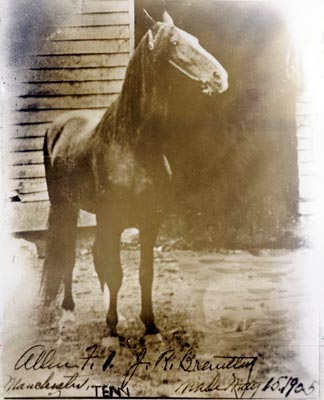
Black Allan in 1905.

The Tennessee Walker originated from the cross of Narragansett Pacer and Canadian Pacer horses brought from Kentucky to Tennessee starting in 1790, with gaited Spanish Mustangs imported from Texas. These horses were bred on the limestone pastures of Middle Tennessee, and became known as "Tennessee Pacers". Originally used as all-purpose horses on plantations and farms, they were used for riding, pulling and racing. They were known for their smooth gaits and sure-footedness on the rocky Tennessee terrain. Over the years, Morgan, Standardbred, Thoroughbred and American Saddlebred blood was also added to the breed.

In 1886, Black Allan (later known as Allan F-1) was born. By the stallion Allendorf (from the Hambletonian family of Standardbreds) and out of a Morgan mare named Maggie Marshall, he became the foundation sire of the Tennessee Walking Horse breed. A failure as a trotting horse, due to his insistence on pacing, Black Allan was instead used for breeding. From his line, a foal named Roan Allen was born in 1904. Able to perform several ambling gaits, Roan Allen became a successful show horse, and in turn sired several famous Tennessee Walking Horses.

The Tennessee Walking Horse Breeders' Association was formed in 1935. To reflect interest in showing horses, the name was changed in 1974 to the current Tennessee Walking Horse Breeders' and Exhibitors' Association (TWHBEA). The stud book was closed in 1947, meaning that since that date every Tennessee Walker must have both its dam and stud registered in order to be eligible for registration. In 1950, the United States Department of Agriculture recognized the Tennessee Walking Horse as a distinct breed.

In 2000, the Tennessee Walking Horse was named the official state horse of the US state of Tennessee. It is the third most-common breed in Kentucky, behind the Thoroughbred and the American Quarter Horse. As of 2005, 450,000 horses have been registered over the life of the TWHBEA, with annual registrations of 13,000–15,000 new foals. While the Tennessee Walking Horse is most common in the southern and southeastern US, it is found throughout the country.

== Uses ==
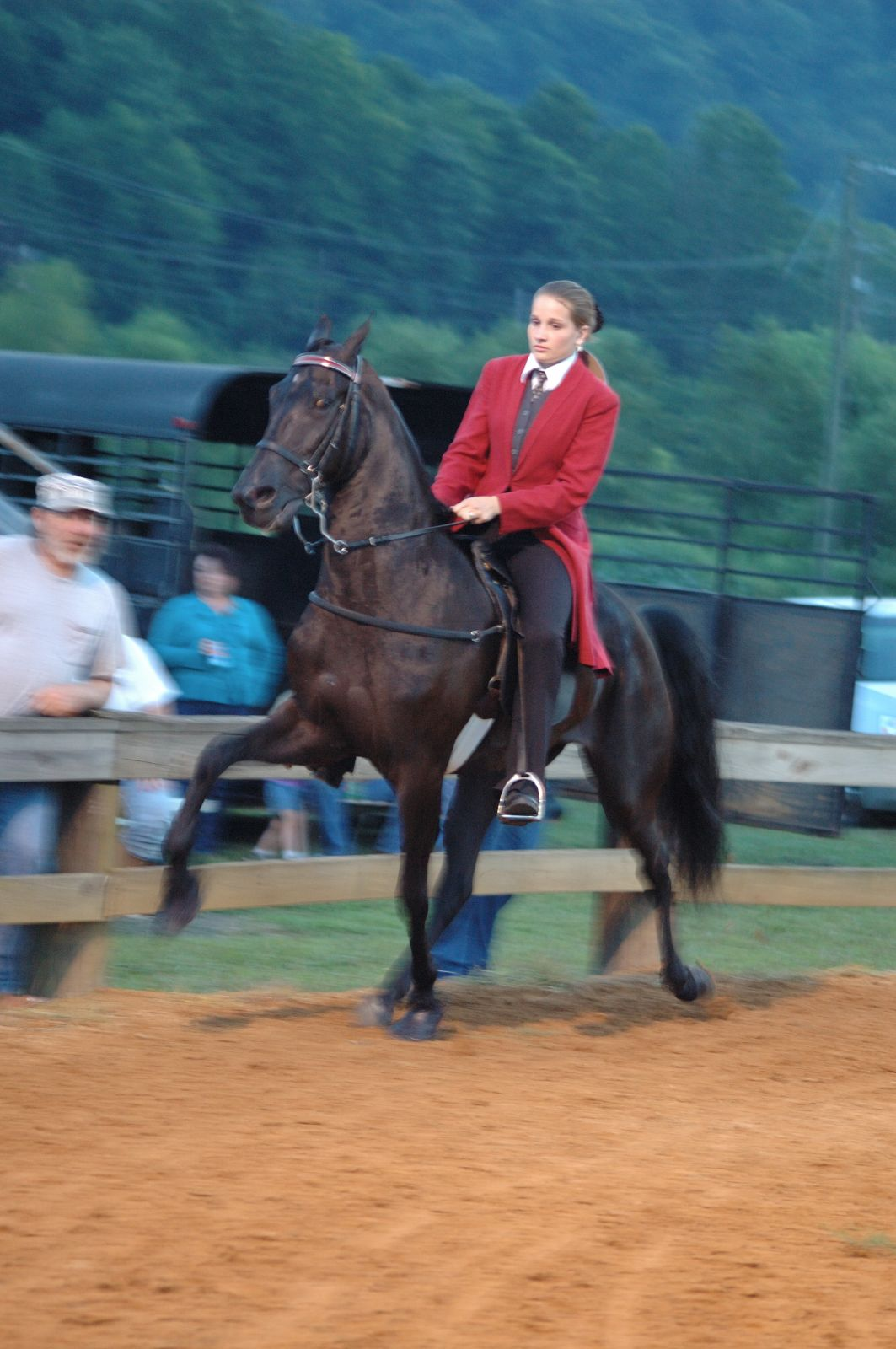
Flat-shod horse performing the running walk

The Tennessee Walker is noted for its appearance in horse show events, particularly performances in saddle seat-style English riding equipment, but is also a very popular trail riding horse. Some are used for endurance riding. To promote this use, the TWHBEA maintains an awards program in conjunction with the American Endurance Ride Conference.

In the 20th century, the Tennessee Walking Horse was crossed with Welsh ponies to create the American Walking Pony, a gaited pony breed.

The breed has also been featured in television, movies and other performing events. The Lone Ranger's horse "Silver" was at times played by a Tennessee Walker. "Trigger, Jr.", the successor to the original "Trigger" made famous by Roy Rogers, was played by a Tennessee Walker named Allen's Gold Zephyr. The position of Traveler, mascot of the University of Southern California Trojans, was held at various times by a purebred Tennessee Walking Horse, and by a Tennessee Walker/Arabian cross.

== Horse shows ==
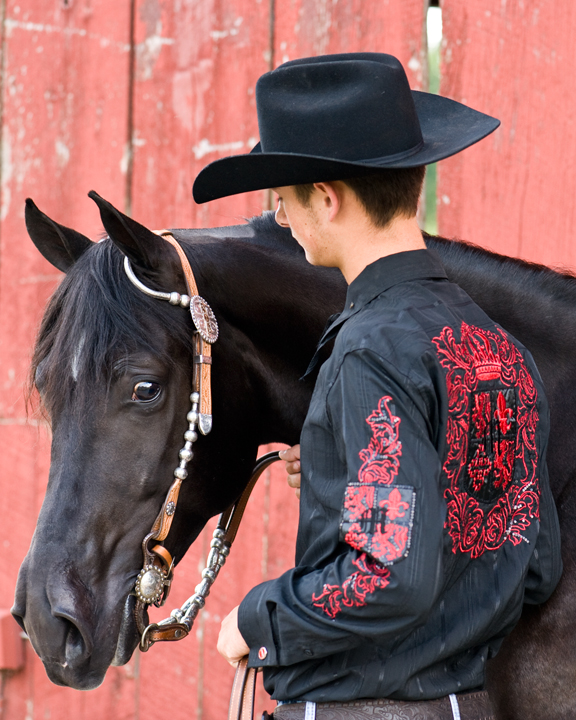
Western equipment

The two basic categories of Tennessee Walking Horse show competition are called "flat-shod" and "performance". Flat-shod horses compete in many different disciplines under both western and English tack. At shows where both divisions are offered, the flat-shod "plantation pleasure" division is judged on brilliance and show presence of the horses while still being well mannered, balanced, and manageable. "Park pleasure" is the most animated of the flat-shod divisions. Flat-shod horses are shown in ordinary horseshoes, and are not allowed to use pads or action devices, though their hooves are sometimes trimmed to a slightly lower angle with more natural toe than seen on stock horse breeds.

Tennessee Walking Horses are typically shown with a long mane and tail. Artificially set tails are seen in "performance" classes, on full-grown horses in halter classes, and in some harness classes, but generally are not allowed in pleasure or flat-shod competition.

Performance horses, sometimes called "padded" or "built up", exhibit flashy and animated gaits, lifting their forelegs high off the ground with each step. This exaggerated action is sometimes called the "Big Lick". The customary style for rider attire and tack is saddle seat. Horses are shod in double and triple-nailed pads, which are sometimes called "stacks". In the early 21st century, this form of shoeing is now prohibited at shows governed by the National Walking Horse Association (NWHA), and the United States Equestrian Federation (USEF). Artificially set tails are seen in "performance" classes, on full-grown horses in halter classes, and in some harness classes, but generally are not allowed in pleasure or flat-shod competition.

Horses in western classes wear equipment similar to that used by other breeds in western pleasure classes, and exhibitors may not mix English and Western-style equipment. Riders must wear a hat or helmet in western classes. Tennessee Walkers are also shown in both pleasure and fine harness driving classes, with grooming similar to the saddle seat horses. In classes where horses are turned out in saddle seat equipment, it is typical for the horse to be shown in a single curb bit with a bit shank under 9.5 inches (24 cm), rather than the double bridle more common to other saddle seat breeds. Riders wear typical saddle seat attire. Hats are not always mandatory, but use of safety helmets is allowed and ranges from strongly encouraged to required in some pleasure division classes.

=== Horse Protection Act ===
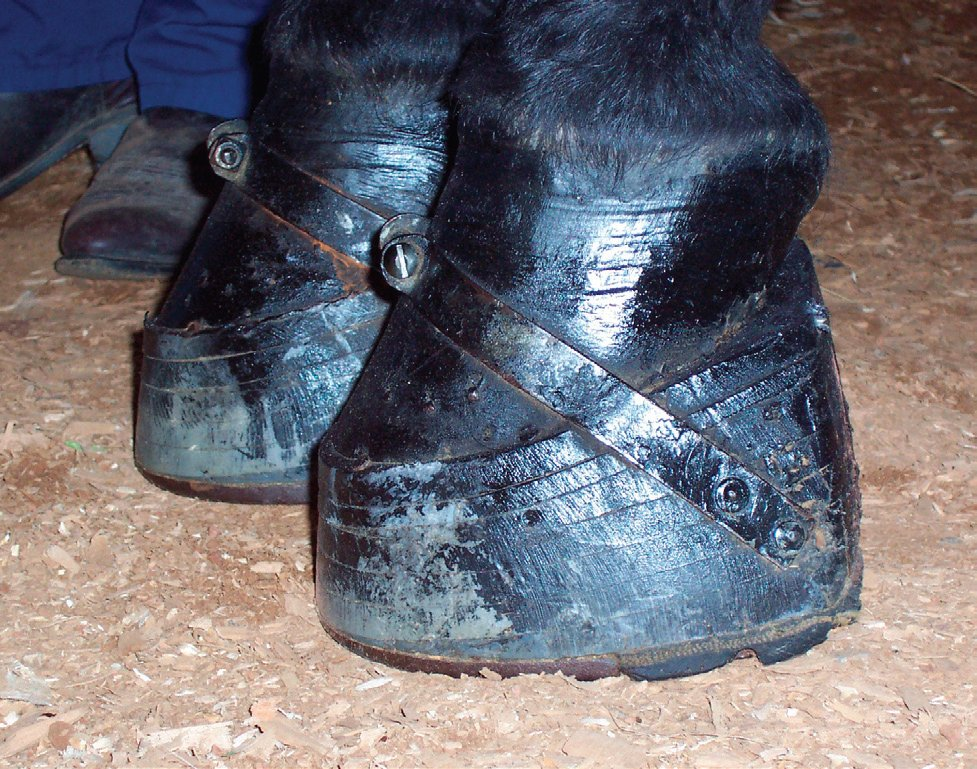
Built up pads, called "stacks", held on by a band over the top of the hoof, are used in performance divisions

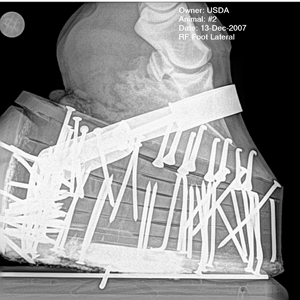
X-ray shows nails attaching the shoe pads that also add additional weight and could create pressure on the sole of the foot, a type of soring

The showing, exhibition and sale of Tennessee Walking Horses and some other horse breeds is governed by the Horse Protection Act of 1970 (HPA) due to concerns about the practice of soring. This developed during the 1950s and became widespread in the 1960s, resulting in a public outcry against it. Congress passed the Horse Protection Act in 1970, declaring the practice to be "cruel and inhumane". The Act prohibits anyone from entering a sored horse into a show, sale, auction or exhibition, and prohibits drivers from transporting sored horses to a sale or show.

Congress delegated statutory responsibility for enforcement to the management of sales and horse shows, but placed administration of the act with the Animal and Plant Health Inspection Service (APHIS) of the United States Department of Agriculture (USDA). Violations of the HPA may result in criminal charges, fines and prison sentences. The USDA certifies certain Horse Industry Organizations (HIOs) to train and license Designated Qualified Persons (DQPs) to complete inspections. APHIS inspection teams, which include inspectors, investigators, and veterinary medical officers, also conduct unannounced inspections of some horse shows, and have the authority to revoke the license of a DQP who does not follow the standards of the Act.

Soring is defined by the HPA with four meanings:

"(3)(A) an irritating or blistering agent has been applied, internally or externally, by a person to any limb of a horse, (B) any burn, cut, or laceration has been inflicted by a person on any limb of a horse, (C) any tack, nail, screw, or chemical agent has been injected by a person into or used by a person on any limb of a horse, or (D) any other substance or device has been used by a person on any limb of a horse or a person has engaged in a practice involving a horse, and, as a result of such application, infliction, injection, use, or practice, such horse suffers, or can reasonably be expected to suffer, physical pain or distress, inflammation, or lameness when walking, "

Action devices, which remain legal but are often used in conjunction with illegal soring practices, are defined in the Code of Federal Regulations as "any boot, collar, chain, roller, or other device which encircles or is placed upon the lower extremity of the leg of a horse in such a manner that it can either rotate around the leg, or slide up and down the leg so as to cause friction, or which can strike the hoof, coronet band or fetlock joint".

Between 1978 and 1982, Auburn University conducted research as to the effect of applications of chemical and physical irritants to the legs of Tennessee Walking Horses. The study found that chains of any weight, used in combination with chemical soring, produced lesions and pain in horses. However, chains of 6 ounces or lighter, used on their own, produced no pain, tissue damage or thermographic changes.

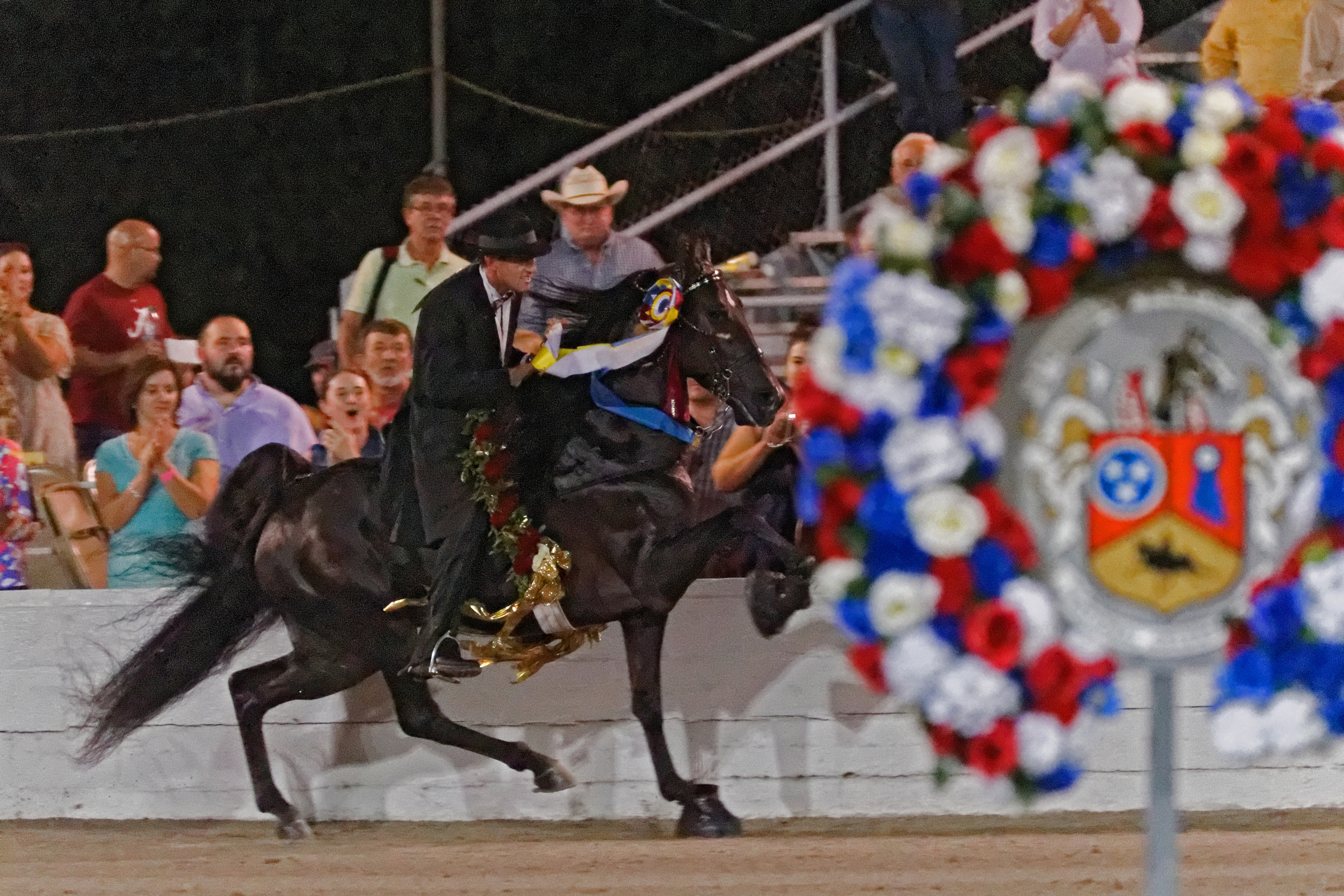
A "big lick" Tennessee Walker wearing legal action devices in 2013. This horse passed strict USDA inspection to be allowed to compete.

Soring can be detected by observing the horse for lameness, assessing its stance and palpating the lower legs. Some trainers trick inspectors by training horses not to react to the pain that palpation may cause, often by severely punishing the horse for flinching when the sored area is touched. The practice is sometimes called "stewarding", in reference to the horse show steward. Some trainers use topical anesthetics, which are timed to wear off before the horse goes into the show ring. Pressure shoeing is also used, eliminating use of chemicals altogether. Trainers who sore their horses have been observed leaving the show grounds when they find that the more stringent federal inspection teams are present.

Although illegal under federal law for more than 40 years, soring is still practiced; criminal charges have been filed against people who violate the Act. Enforcement of the HPA is difficult, due to limited inspection budgets and problems with lax enforcement by inspectors who are hired by the shows they were to police. As a result, while in 1999 there were eight certified HIOs, by 2010, only three organizations remained certified as HIOs, all known to be actively working to end soring.

In 2013, legislation to amend and strengthen the HPA was introduced in Congress. The President and executive committee of the TWHBEA voted to support this legislation, but the full board of directors chose not to. The bi-partisan bill, H.R. 1518, was sponsored by Representative Ed Whitfield (R-KY), and Representative Steve Cohen (D-TN), with 216 co-sponsors. On November 13, 2013 a hearing was held. Supporters included the American Horse Council, the American Veterinary Medical Association, members of the TWHBEA, the International Walking Horse Association, and Friends of Sound Horses. Opponents included members of the Performance Horse Show Association, and the Tennessee Commissioner of Agriculture. The legislation did not pass in the 113th Congress and was reintroduced in 2015 for the 114th Congress. In 2016, the USDA proposed new rules independent of the PAST Act, banning stacks and chains, and providing stricter inspections at training barns, auctions, and shows.

=== Show rules and organizations ===
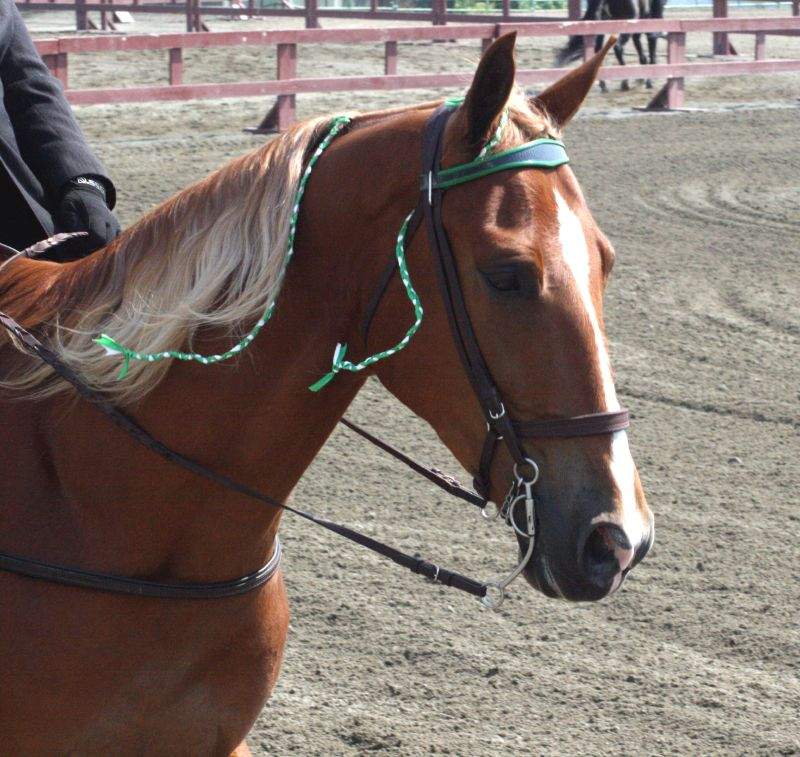
Showing with single curb show bridle and braided ribbons added to mane and forelock, typical of English classes

Controversies over shoeing rules, concerns about soring, and the breed industry's compliance with the Horse Protection Act has resulted in the development of multiple governing organizations. The breed registry is kept by the TWHBEA, which promotes all riding disciplines within the breed, but does not sanction horse shows.

The USEF does not currently recognize or sanction any Tennessee Walking Horse shows. In 2013 it banned the use of action devices and stacks at any time in any class.

The Tennessee Walking Horse Heritage Society is a group dedicated to the preservation of the original Tennessee Walker bloodlines, mainly for use as trail and pleasure horses, rather than for showing. Horses listed by the organization descend from the foundation bloodstock registered by the TWHBEA. Pedigrees may not include horses that have been shown with stacks post-1976.

Two organizations have formed to promote the exhibition of flat-shod horses. The National Walking Horse Association (NWHA) promotes only naturally gaited horses in its sanctioned horse shows, has its own rule book, and is the official USEF affiliate organization for the breed. The NWHA sanctions horse shows and licenses judges, and is an authorized HIO.

The NWHA was in the process of building its own "tracking registry" to document both pedigree and performance achievements of horses recorded there. These included the Spotted Saddle Horse and Racking Horse breeds as well as the Tennessee Walker. However, the NWHA was sued by the Tennessee Walking Horse Breeders & Exhibitors Association (TWHBEA), which eventually won some concessions regarding the use of the TWHBEA's copyrighted registry certificates by the NWHA. While the judgment did not prohibit the NWHA from continuing its registry service, this is no longer advertised on the NWHA website.

Friends of Sound Horses (FOSH) also promotes exhibition of flat-shod and barefoot horses. It licenses judges for both pleasure classes and gaited dressage, promotes use of gaited horses in distance riding and sport horse activities, and is an authorized HIO.

Two organizations promulgate rules for horse shows in which action devices are allowed: the Walking Horse Owners Association (WHOA) and "S.H.O.W." ("Sound horses, Honest judging, Objective inspections, Winning fairly") which regulates the Tennessee Walking Horse National Celebration. The Celebration has been held in Shelbyville, Tennessee, each August since 1939. It is considered the showcase competition for the breed. In the early 21st century, the Celebration has attracted large amounts of attention and controversy due to the concerns about violations of the Horse Protection Act.
