= Pride of Midnight =

- Breed: Tennessee Walking Horse
- Discipline: Show horse
- Sire: Midnight Sun
- Grandsire: Wilson's Allen
- Dam: Pride of Stanley
- Sex: Stallion
- Foaled: 1966
- Color: Black
- Breeder: Harlinsdale Farm
- Owner: Harlinsdale Farm
- Trainer: Dot Warren

Pride of Midnight (1966-1979) was a Tennessee Walking Horse who had a short career as a show horse but became very notable as a sire in his breed.

== Life ==
Pride of Midnight was foaled in 1966. He was a black stallion with a snip of white on his nose. He was sired by the two-time World Grand Champion Midnight Sun and out of the mare Pride of Stanley. His paternal grandsire was Wilson's Allen, and his great-grandsire was the foundation stallion Roan Allen. He was bred and owned by Harlinsdale Farm. Pride of Midnight was trained by Dot Warren and won first in several horse shows, but was retired to breeding at a young age. He became one of the most notable sires in the Tennessee Walking Horse industry. He died in 1979, after colicking twice. Bill Harlin, one of Harlinsdale's owners, later said that when Pride of Midnight died, it was the last time he saw his father cry.

== Influence ==
During his lifetime Pride of Midnight sired 1703 foals who were registered with the Tennessee Walking Horse Breeders' and Exhibitors' Association. Numerous World and World Grand Champions are among his descendants. His son Pride's Generator was a three-time World Champion and also a notable sire. His grandsons include Cash for Keeps, the 2000 World Grand Champion; Generator's Silver Dollar, a notable stud; Gen's Armed and Dangerous, the 1993 World Grand Champion; The Skywatch, two-time World Champion; and Generator's Santana, the 1997 World Grand Champion.

Sire line descent tree
- Pride of Midnight
  - Pride's Design
    - Flashy Pride
  - Pride's Gold Coin
    - Coin's Hard Cash
      - Cash for Keeps
      - Gold Power
        - Main Power
      - Lined With Cash
        - Walk Time Charlie
        - I'm Mayhem
  - Pride's Royal Master
    - Mind Games
      - Gameworld
  - Pride's Generator
    - Gen's Major General
      - Jose Jose
        - I Am Jose
    - Gen's Armed and Dangerous
      - The Whole Nine Yards
    - Gen's Fable
      - Gen's Black Gin
        - Gen's Black Maverick
        - Gen A' Mighty
    - A Jazz Man
      - Master of Jazz
        - Master's Razzle and Jazz
    - Generator's Santana
      - Santana's El Nino
    - Generator's Silver Dollar
      - A Strong Dollar
        - A Strong Need For Cash
        - He's Vida Blue
        - Greenspan
        - I'm Johnny Dollar
        - Stretch Your Dollar
    - The Skywatch
      - Skywalk
      - Watch It Now
      - The Coach
  - Pride's Jubilee Star
    - Pride's Sundance Star
    - Pride's Jubilee Encore
  - Pride's Secret Threat
  - A Command Performance
    - He's Puttin' on the Ritz
      - The Titleist
        - Honors
  - Pride's Dark Spirit
    - Dark Spirit's Rebel
      - RPM
  - Pride's Genius
    - The Revelation
      - Rowdy Rev
  - Pride's John Grey
    - Another Grey John
      - The Touch
  - Delight of Pride
  - Pride's Final Edition
