= Midnight Sun (horse) =

American horse

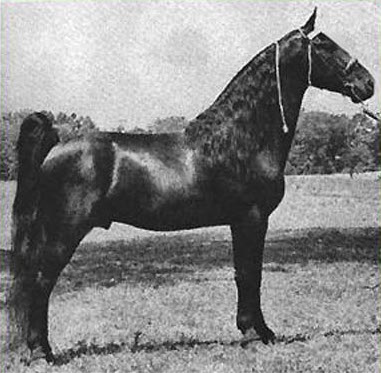
- Midnight Sun
- Breed: Tennessee Walking Horse
- Discipline: Show horse
- Sire: Wilson's Allen
- Grandsire: Roan Allen
- Dam: Ramsey's Rena
- Maternal grandsire: Dement's Allen
- Sex: Stallion
- Foaled: 1940
- Country: United States of America
- Color: Black, no markings
- Breeder: Samuel M. Ramsey
- Trainer: Fred Walker

Major wins
- World Grand Championships, 1945, 1946

Midnight Sun (1940–65) was one of the leading sires of the Tennessee Walking Horse breed, and a two-time World Grand Champion in 1945 and 1946. He was trained by Fred Walker and lived almost all his life at Harlinsdale Farm in Franklin, Tennessee.

Midnight Sun sired approximately 2,600 foals in his life, one of which became the three-time World Grand Champion The Talk of the Town. Of the horses that have won the annual Tennessee Walking Horse World Grand Championship since 1949, only four were not of Midnight Sun's bloodline.

== Life and winnings ==
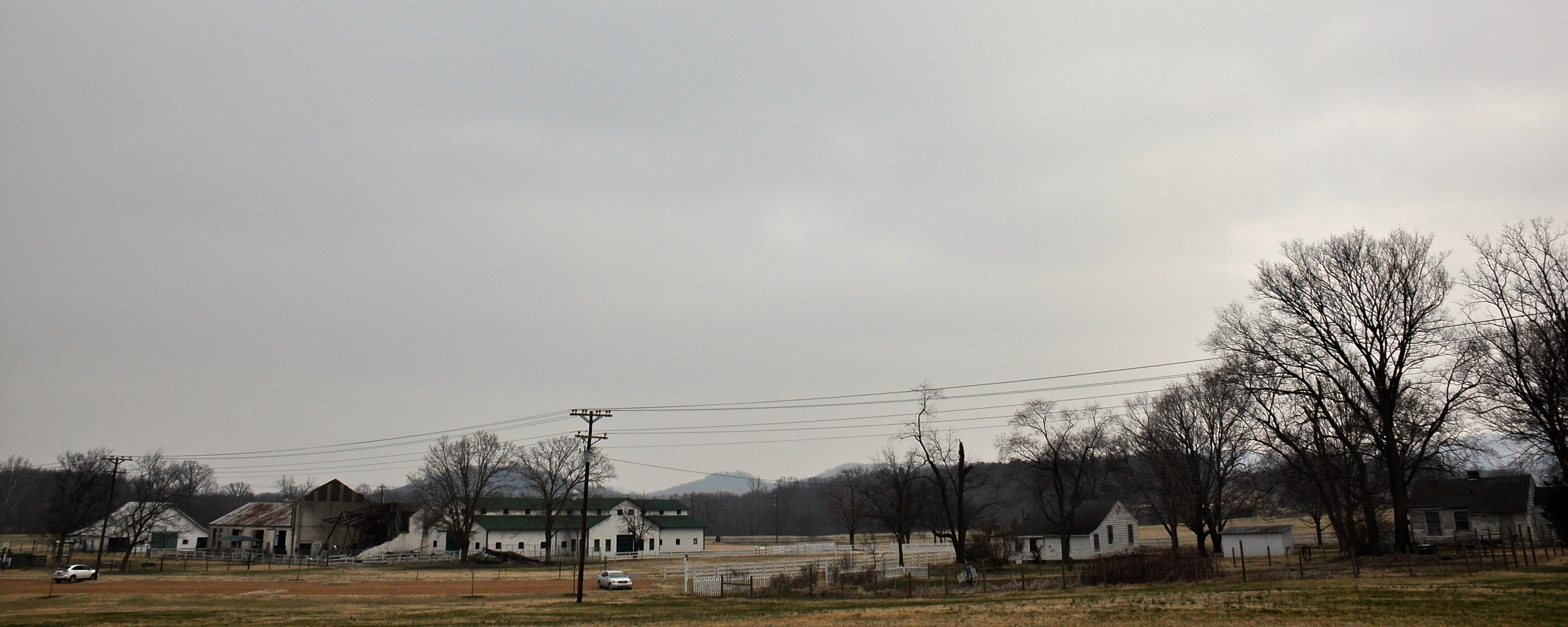
Harlinsdale Farm, the longtime home of Midnight Sun, as it appears today.

Midnight Sun was foaled on June 8, 1940, out of a mostly Standardbred mare named Ramsey's Rena, and sired by the stallion Wilson's Allen. He was a solid black stallion who matured to just under 16 hands (64 inches, 163 cm) and weighed 1,350 pounds (610 kg), unusually stout for his breed. His original name was Joe Lewis Wilson.

Through his sire, Midnight Sun was a great-grandson of Black Allan, also known as Allan F-1, who was the foundation sire of the Tennessee Walking Horse breed. Midnight Sun's half-brother on his sire's side, Strolling Jim, became the first ever National Champion in 1939, and three of his other siblings were early champions as well. In 1944 Midnight Sun was bought by Wirt and Alex Harlin for $4,400 and taken to their Harlinsdale Farm.

Midnight Sun was trained by Fred Walker. He became the first Tennessee Walking Horse to win the World Grand Championship title when it was first awarded in 1945, and he followed up that win with another World Grand Championship the next year, in 1946, making him the second repeat winner after Haynes Peacock, his half-brother. At the time, the stake carried a purse of $1,000.

Midnight Sun was known for his calm disposition; it wasn't uncommon for stablehands at his home, Harlinsdale Farm near Franklin, Tennessee, to let visiting children ride him bareback, so they could say they rode a two-time world grand champion. In 1956 he was bought by Eleanor and Geraldine Livingston at the Harlinsdale Farm dispersal sale, for $50,000. The Livingstons stipulated that Midnight Sun be kept at Harlinsdale under the same routine he had had for most of his life. He continued to stand at stud on the farm until his death, and was handled and groomed nearly all his life by Red Laws, who died within a year of the horse's death. Midnight Sun was never turned out, and Laws once said, "Somebody had hold of him all his life." In all, he lived at Harlinsdale Farm for 21 years. Midnight Sun died of colic on November 7, 1965, and was buried at Harlinsdale Farm, where his grave is still visible today.

== Legacy ==
Midnight Sun has been described as the single most influential Tennessee Walking Horse sire and a sire of sires. Since 1949, only four horses not of Midnight Sun's line have won the Tennessee Walking Horse World Grand Championship, the breed's highest honor. Midnight Sun sired five horses who won the World Grand Championship: Midnight Merry in 1949; The Talk of the Town in 1951, 1952, and 1953; Sun's Jet Parade in 1957; Setting Sun in 1958; and Sun's Delight D. in 1963. One of these, The Talk of the Town, was the first three-time World Grand Champion. Midnight Sun was also great-grandsire of I Am Jose, the second three-time winner. Most of the leading Tennessee Walker sires in recent years have themselves been descendants of Midnight Sun, most notably his son Pride of Midnight, who took his father's place as Harlinsdale's lead sire after the older horse's death. Midnight Sun sired approximately 2,600 foals in his lifetime, and during his stud career earned his owners close to $100,000 a year, mostly through the then-new use of artificial insemination (AI). Through his offspring, he has also influenced the Racking Horse and Spotted Saddle Horse breeds. For many years, a life-size statue of Midnight Sun, commissioned after his death by his former owner Geraldine Livingston, stood at the TWHBEA headquarters in Lewisburg, Tennessee.

Sire line descent tree
- Midnight Sun
  - Skipper Son Midnight
    - Ebony Masterpiece
      - Ebony's Senator
      - Ebony Mountain Man
      - Ebony's True Grit
      - Another Masterpiece
      - Ebony's Bold Courier
      - Dr Elmer
        - Doc's High Tribute
      - Black Charger
        - Masquerading
  - Talk of the Town
  - Midnight's Major
    - B Major Wilson
  - Midnight Mack
    - Rodgers Perfection
      - Perfectionist's Carbon Copy
        - Mark of Carbon
      - Shades of Carbon
    - Mack K's Handshaker
      - Shaker's Shocker
        - Shocker's Shocker
      - Handshaker's Delight
  - Sun's Quarterback
    - Triple Threat
      - Threat's Supreme
  - Sun's Jet Parade
  - Setting Sun
  - Sun's Gunsmoke
    - Drug Dealer
      - The Pusher
        - The Pushover
          - Poison
            - The Black Night Shade
        - Pusher's Doing Time
          - Out On Parole
  - Sun's Delight
    - Delight Bummin Around
  - Black Go Boy Sun
    - Go Boys Black Fury
      - Motown Magic
  - Pride of Midnight
    - Pride's Design
      - Flashy Pride
    - Pride's Gold Coin
      - Coin's Hard Cash
        - Cash for Keeps
        - Gold Power
        - Lined With Cash
    - Pride's Royal Master
      - Mind Games
        - Gameworld
    - Pride's Generator
      - Gen's Major General
        - Jose Jose
      - Gen's Armed and Dangerous
        - The Whole Nine Yards
      - Gen's Fable
        - Gen's Black Gin
      - A Jazz Man
        - Master of Jazz
      - Generator's Santana
        - Santana's El Nino
      - Generator's Silver Dollar
        - A Strong Dollar
      - The Skywatch
        - Skywalk
        - Watch It Now
        - The Coach
    - Pride's Jubilee Star
      - Pride's Sundance Star
      - Pride's Jubilee Encore
    - Pride's Secret Threat
    - A Command Performance
      - He's Puttin' on the Ritz
        - The Titleist
    - Pride's Genius
      - The Revelation
        - Rowdy Rev
    - Pride's Dark Spirit
      - Dark Spirit's Rebel
        - RPM
    - Pride's John Grey
      - Another Grey John
        - The Touch
    - Delight of Pride
    - Pride's Final Edition

== Pedigree ==
Pedigree of Midnight Sun
Sire Wilson's Allen	Roan Allen	Black Allan*	Allendorf*
Sire Wilson's Allen	Roan Allen	Black Allan*	Maggie Marshall*
Sire Wilson's Allen	Roan Allen	Gertrude	Royal Denmark
Sire Wilson's Allen	Roan Allen	Gertrude	Ball II
Sire Wilson's Allen	Birdie Messick	Black Allan*	Allendorf*
Sire Wilson's Allen	Birdie Messick	Black Allan*	Maggie Marshall*
Sire Wilson's Allen	Birdie Messick	Nellie	Walking Dan Allen
Sire Wilson's Allen	Birdie Messick	Nellie	Minnie Ready
Dam Ramsey's Rena	Dements Allen	Hunters Allen	Black Allan*
Dam Ramsey's Rena	Dements Allen	Hunters Allen	Allis
Dam Ramsey's Rena	Dements Allen	Kate McCrady	Brown Hal Jr
Dam Ramsey's Rena	Dements Allen	Kate McCrady	By Crames
Dam Ramsey's Rena	Dena	Bell Buckle	Bow Bells
Dam Ramsey's Rena	Dena	Bell Buckle	Leta Wedgewood
Dam Ramsey's Rena	Dena	Daisy Mc	John Covington's Hal
Dam Ramsey's Rena	Dena	Daisy Mc	By Galson

* Midnight Sun is inbred 3S × 3S x 4D to the stallion Black Allan, meaning that he appears third generation twice on the sire side of his pedigree and fourth generation once on the dam side of his pedigree.

== See also ==
- List of historical horses
