= Roan Allen =

- Roan Allen ridden by James Brantley
- Breed: Tennessee Walking Horse
- Discipline: Show horse
- Sire: Black Allan
- Grandsire: Allendorf
- Dam: Gertrude
- Maternal grandsire: Royal Denmark
- Sex: Stallion
- Foaled: 1904
- Country: United States
- Color: Red roan, blaze, front socks, hind stockings
- Owner: James Brantley
- Trainer: Charlie Ashley

Honors
- Posthumously given registration number F-38, marking him as foundation bloodstock

Roan Allen (1904–1930) was one of the founding sires of the Tennessee Walking Horse. It is believed that all Tennessee Walking Horses alive today trace back to him.

== Life ==
Roan Allen was born May 23, 1904, on the farm of James Brantley in Coffee County, Tennessee. He was sired by Black Allan, the stallion who would later be given the designation Allan F-1, and out of the mare Gertrude. Roan Allen was a red roan stallion with a blaze, front socks, and high hind stockings. When he matured, he stood 15.3 hands (63 inches, 160 cm) and had a long flaxen mane and tail. He was noted for his good conformation. Brantley observed him performing a true running walk within a few hours of his birth. When Roan Allen was three years old, he was put in training with Charlie Ashley of Manchester, Tennessee. Ashley trained Roan Allen to perform seven distinct gaits on command, including the running walk, flat walk, fox trot, true trot and rack. When Roan Allen was fully trained, he was competed successfully in Walking Horse, five-gaited, and harness classes in county fairs.

Roan Allen died in 1930, under rather unusual circumstances. Brantley had loaned him to a farmer named Wallace in McMinnville for breeding purposes. While at the Wallace farm, Roan Allen was kicked by a mare and suffered a broken leg. The injury did not respond to treatment, and the stallion had to be euthanized. James Brantley insisted on putting Roan Allen down himself, even though several others offered to perform the duty.

== Influence ==
Roan Allen was given the designation F-38 when the Tennessee Walking Horse Breeders' and Exhibitors' Association was formed in 1935, five years after his death. It is estimated that 100% of living Tennessee Walking Horses trace their lineage back to Roan Allen. Roan Allen sired 470 registered foals, including the foundation horses Mitch F-5, Sallie F-45, and Hiles Allen F-72. One of his sons, Wilson's Allen, sired five of the early World Grand Champions, including Strolling Jim and Midnight Sun.

Sire line descent tree
- Roan Allen
  - Wilson's Allen
    - Roy Wilson
    - Wilson Allen Repeat
    - The Last Wilson Allen
    - Haynes Peacock
    - Slippery Allen
      - Fulton's Wilson Allen
    - Victor Allen
    - Wartrace
    - Miller's Wilson Allen
    - Strolling Jim
    - The G Man
    - Wilson's Allen's Replica
    - Hill's Wilson's Allen
    - Sir Maugray
    - Wilson Allen Again
    - Wilson's Allen Jr
    - Wilson's Allen's Sunset Gold
    - Wilson Allen's Dictator
    - Frank Wilson
    - Gold Bond
    - King's Wilson's Allen
    - Red Warrior
    - Top Wilson
    - Wilson's Allen's Boss Man
    - Wilson's Allen's II
    - Wilson's Allen's Order
    - Billy Wilson
    - Fisher's Wilson's Allen
    - Governor Wilson
    - Hi-Boy
    - King of Haven
    - King of the Alamo
    - Limestone Wilson
    - Midnight Sun
      - Skipper Son Midnight
        - Ebony Masterpiece
      - Talk of the Town
      - Midnight's Major
        - B Major Wilson
      - Midnight Mack
        - Rodgers Perfection
        - Mack K's Handshaker
      - Sun's Quarterback
        - Triple Threat
      - Sun's Jet Parade
      - Setting Sun
      - Sun's Gunsmoke
        - Drug Dealer
      - Sun's Delight
        - Delight Bummin Around
      - Black Go Boy Sun
        - Go Boys Black Fury
      - Pride of Midnight
        - Pride's Design
        - Pride's Gold Coin
        - Pride's Royal Master
        - Pride's Generator
        - Pride's Jubilee Star
        - Pride's Secret Threat
        - A Command Performance
        - Pride's Genius
        - Pride's John Grey
        - Pride's Dark Spirit
        - Delight of Pride
        - Pride's Final Edition
    - Wilson Dean
    - Wilson's Ace
    - Wilson's Allen Winchester
    - Wilson's Allen's Echo
    - Wilson's Flight Allen
    - Society Man
  - Merry Boy
    - Old Glory
      - Old Glory's Big Man
    - Little Merry Boy
      - Scat Man
        - The Super Stock
    - Merry Go Boy
      - Go Boy's Shadow
        - Shadows Shadow
      - Go Boy's Royal Heir
      - Go Boy's Sundust
  - Hall Allen
    - Aristocratic Allen
    - Red Ace
    - Rhoda Allen
    - Hall Allen's Playboy

== Pedigree ==
Pedigree of Roan Allen
Sire Black Allan	Allendorf	Onward	George Wilkes
Sire Black Allan	Allendorf	Onward	Dolly
Sire Black Allan	Allendorf	Alma Mater	Mambrino Patchen
Sire Black Allan	Allendorf	Alma Mater	Estella
Sire Black Allan	Maggie Marshall	Telegraph	Black Hawk
Sire Black Allan	Maggie Marshall	Telegraph	(unknown)
Sire Black Allan	Maggie Marshall	Truman Pollock mare	Truman Pollock
Sire Black Allan	Maggie Marshall	Truman Pollock mare	(unknown)
Dam Gertrude	Royal Denmark	Artist	King William
Dam Gertrude	Royal Denmark	Artist	Lucy
Dam Gertrude	Royal Denmark	(unknown)	(unknown)
Dam Gertrude	Royal Denmark	(unknown)	(unknown)
Dam Gertrude	Ball II	Bullet Jr	Bullet
Dam Gertrude	Ball II	Bullet Jr	Oleary mare
Dam Gertrude	Ball II	Ball	Earnhardts Brooks
Dam Gertrude	Ball II	Ball	(unknown)
