= Wilson's Allen =

- Breed: Tennessee Walking Horse
- Sire: Roan Allen
- Grandsire: Black Allan
- Dam: Birdie Messick
- Maternal grandsire: Black Allan
- Sex: Stallion
- Foaled: 1914
- Country: United States
- Color: Chestnut
- Breeder: Bud Messick
- Trainer: Steve Hill

Wilson's Allen (1914–1939) was an influential early Tennessee Walking Horse sire. Although he himself was not used as a show horse, he sired the first three World Grand Champions of his breed.

== Life ==
Wilson's Allen was a Tennessee Walking Horse stallion foaled in 1914 (some sources say 1917) in Coffee County, Tennessee. He was bred by Bud Messick at the urging of Johnson Hill, who contracted to buy the colt for $200. Wilson's Allen was by the foundation sire Roan Allen and out of a mare named Birdie Messick. The breeding created a stir in the area because Roan Allen and Birdie Messick were both sired by Black Allan. That mating is considered by some to be the first deliberate act of inbreeding within the Tennessee Walking Horse breed. Wilson's Allen was a chestnut with a left hind sock. Wilson's Allen was taken to Johnson Hill's farm at five months old. When he reached maturity, he was started under saddle by Hill's nephew Steve Hill, who later became a successful horse trainer.

Johnson Hill died in 1922 and Wilson's Allen was sold to Bibb Kirby. By then the horse had lost an eye and was referred to as "Kirby's one-eyed horse". Kirby tried to breed Wilson's Allen but did not have much success. In 1928 Wilson's Allen was sold to Frank Wilson, who immediately stood him at stud, with considerable success.

== Death and burial ==
Wilson's Allen died in 1939 and was actually buried three different times. The first burial was right after his death, and the grave was located at Steve Hill's stables, but in 1975 the horse's body was exhumed and taken to Middle Tennessee State University (MTSU), where he was buried on the campus. Later, his grave was moved to a new location near the MTSU Horse Science Center, where it remains to this day.

== Descendants ==
Wilson's Allen sired a total of 482 foals. Among them were five of the first ten World Grand Champions: Strolling Jim, winner in 1939; Haynes Peacock, winner in 1940 and 1941; Melody Maid, winner in 1942; City Girl, winner in 1944; and Midnight Sun, winner in 1945 and 1946. It is estimated that of the nearly 70 horses who have won the World Grand Championship, only three do not trace in a direct line back to Wilson's Allen.

Sire line descent tree
- Wilson's Allen
  - Roy Wilson
  - Wilson Allen Repeat
  - The Last Wilson Allen
  - Haynes Peacock
  - Slippery Allen
    - Fulton's Wilson Allen
  - Victor Allen
  - Wartrace
  - Miller's Wilson Allen
  - Strolling Jim
  - The G Man
  - Wilson's Allen's Replica
  - Hill's Wilson's Allen
  - Sir Maugray
  - Wilson Allen Again
  - Wilson's Allen Jr
  - Wilson's Allen's Sunset Gold
  - Wilson Allen's Dictator
  - Frank Wilson
  - Gold Bond
  - King's Wilson's Allen
  - Red Warrior
  - Top Wilson
  - Wilson's Allen's Boss Man
  - Wilson's Allen's II
  - Wilson's Allen's Order
  - Billy Wilson
  - Fisher's Wilson's Allen
  - Governor Wilson
  - Hi-Boy
  - King of Haven
  - King of the Alamo
  - Limestone Wilson
  - Midnight Sun
    - Skipper Son Midnight
      - Ebony Masterpiece
        - Ebony's Senator
        - Ebony Mountain Man
        - Ebony's True Grit
        - Another Masterpiece
        - Ebony's Bold Courier
        - Dr Elmer
        - Black Charger
    - Talk of the Town
    - Midnight's Major
      - B Major Wilson
    - Midnight Mack
      - Rodgers Perfection
        - Perfectionist's Carbon Copy
        - Shades of Carbon
      - Mack K's Handshaker
        - Shaker's Shocker
        - Handshaker's Delight
    - Sun's Quarterback
      - Triple Threat
        - Threat's Supreme
    - Sun's Jet Parade
    - Setting Sun
    - Sun's Gunsmoke
      - Drug Dealer
        - The Pusher
    - Sun's Delight
      - Delight Bummin Around
    - Black Go Boy Sun
      - Go Boys Black Fury
        - Motown Magic
    - Pride of Midnight
      - Pride's Design
        - Flashy Pride
      - Pride's Gold Coin
        - Coin's Hard Cash
      - Pride's Royal Master
        - Mind Games
      - Pride's Generator
        - Gen's Major General
        - Gen's Armed and Dangerous
        - Gen's Fable
        - A Jazz Man
        - Generator's Santana
        - Generator's Silver Dollar
        - The Skywatch
      - Pride's Jubilee Star
        - Pride's Sundance Star
        - Pride's Jubilee Encore
      - Pride's Secret Threat
      - Pride's Genius
        - The Revelation
      - A Command Performance
        - He's Puttin' on the Ritz
      - Pride's John Grey
        - Another Grey John
      - Pride's Dark Spirit
        - Dark Spirit's Rebel
      - Delight of Pride
      - Pride's Final Edition
  - Wilson Dean
  - Wilson's Ace
  - Wilson's Allen Winchester
  - Wilson's Allen's Echo
  - Wilson's Flight Allen
  - Society Man

== Pedigree ==
Pedigree of Wilson's Allen
Sire Roan Allen	Black Allan*	Allendorf*	Onward*
Sire Roan Allen	Black Allan*	Allendorf*	Alma Mater*
Sire Roan Allen	Black Allan*	Maggie Marshall*	Bradfords Telegraph*
Sire Roan Allen	Black Allan*	Maggie Marshall*	Truman Pollock mare*
Sire Roan Allen	Gertrude	Royal Denmark	Artist
Sire Roan Allen	Gertrude	Royal Denmark	(unknown)
Sire Roan Allen	Gertrude	Ball II	Bullet Jr.
Sire Roan Allen	Gertrude	Ball II	Ball
Dam Birdie Messick	Black Allan*	Allendorf*	Onward*
Dam Birdie Messick	Black Allan*	Allendorf*	Alma Mater*
Dam Birdie Messick	Black Allan*	Maggie Marshall*	Bradfords Telegraph*
Dam Birdie Messick	Black Allan*	Maggie Marshall*	Truman Pollock mare*
Dam Birdie Messick	Nellie	Walking Dan Allen	Major
Dam Birdie Messick	Nellie	Walking Dan Allen	Martha Washington
Dam Birdie Messick	Nellie	Minnie Ready	Hal Summer
Dam Birdie Messick	Nellie	Minnie Ready	Readys Stonewall

* Wilson's Allen is inbred 2S × 2D to the stallion Black Allan, meaning that he appears second generation on the sire side of his pedigree and second generation on the dam side of his pedigree.
