= Black Allan (horse) =

Foundation sire of the Tennessee Walking Horse

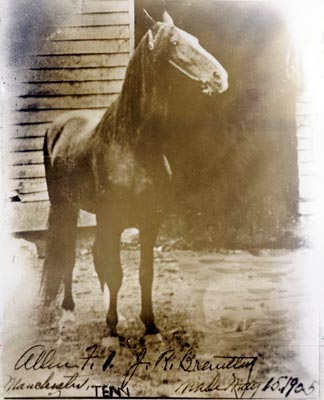
- Black Allan at James Brantley's farm, c. 1905
- Breed: Tennessee Walking Horse
- Sire: Allandorf
- Grandsire: Onward
- Dam: Maggie Marshall
- Maternal grandsire: Bradfords Telegraph
- Foaled: 1886
- Country: United States
- Color: Black; blaze; hind sock; hind coronet
- Owner: James Brantley; Albert Dement

Honors
- Posthumously given registration number F-1 by the Tennessee Walking Horse Breeders' and Exhibitors' Association

Black Allan or Allan F-1 (September 17 1886 – September 30 1910) was the foundation sire of the Tennessee Walking Horse. He was out of a Morgan and Thoroughbred cross mare named Maggie Marshall, a descendant of Figure and the Thoroughbred racing stallion Messenger; and sired by Allandorf, a Standardbred stallion descended from Hambletonian 10, also of the Messenger line.

Black Allan was registered as No. 7623 by the American Trotting Registry. Although Black Allan was supposed to be a trotter, he preferred to pace, and so never raced. Besides the pace, he performed a lateral ambling gait now known as the running walk.

He was a black stallion standing 15 hands (60 inches, 152 cm), 5 feet high. He was given the designation Allan F-1 when the Tennessee Walking Horse Breeders' Association, precursor to the Tennessee Walking Horse Breeders' and Exhibitors' Association, was formed in 1935. He had multiple owners throughout his life, but his last owners, James Brantley and Albert Dement, were the only ones to recognize Black Allan's use as a breeding stallion.

Black Allan sired 111 known foals in his lifetime, among them Roan Allen, registration number F-38, Hunters Allen F-10, and Merry Legs F-4. Black Allan died September 17, 1910, at the age of 29.

== Life ==
Black Allan (Note: Although Black Allan's name is sometimes incorrectly spelled "Allen" – he was registered as "Black Allan" – The misspelling probably arose from a scrivener's error by the registrar, so in his descendants the name is spelled "Allen".) was foaled on a limestone pasture in the middle of Tennessee in 1886. He was out of a 17-year-old black Morgan and Thoroughbred cross mare named Maggie Marshall (b. 1869), bred by Truman Pollock of Augusta, Kentucky, by Allandorf (b. 1882), a 4-year-old gray Standardbred stallion.

From 1877 to 1888, Maggie Marshall had been annually bred to produce foals. She was first bred by a Billy Marshall to Mambrino Patchen (b. 1862), a black Standardbred stallion, which produced a black colt in 1877; and from 1879 to 1885, Maggie Marshall would be alternatively bred back to Mambrino Patchen and his half-brother, the Standardbred stallion Mambrino King. Both stallions also had mixed Thoroughbred and Saddlebred ancestry, with both being of the Messenger line. Mambrino King was linebred to the American Thoroughbred racing sire Sir Archy (b. 1805), as well as the Thoroughbred stallion Duroc (b. 1806), a son of Diomed.

During this time, Maggie Marshall most oftentimes threw black trotter foals, passing her coloring to her offspring. This also was true of Black Allan, who was her first and only foal by Allandorf. Black Allan would be the mare's last foal, with her final breeding to the Standardbred stallion Red Wilkes (b. 1874) - a grandson of Hambletonian 10, largely Thoroughbred, with ample Morgan-cross blood - resulting in stillborn bay filly in 1888.

Black Allan was a black stallion standing 15 hands (60 inches, 152 cm), with a sock on his left hind foot, coronet on his right hind foot, and a blaze on his face. He was registered with the American Trotting Registry, and given registration number 7623.

He was sold many times throughout his life, the first time at the side of his dam. He was bought by George H. Ely of Elyria, Ohio, who already owned an 1882 chestnut colt out of Maggie Marshall by Mambrino King, Elyria, whose record for trotting the mile was 2:25. Ely hoped Black Allan would compare to the older colt, but sold him in 1891 when he discovered that Black Allan was a pacer. It is now known that Black Allan also performed the lateral ambling gait known as the running walk. He was lightly raced, but was unable to produce a burst of speed toward the end of his races, and generally finished last. Nonetheless, due to his looks, early speed, and long stride, he was put to stud.

Black Allan was bought by John P. Mankin of Murfreesboro, Tennessee, for $335, only to be sold again a few years later. One owner, J.A. McCulloch, used Black Allan as a "teaser" to see if mares were in estrus before they were bred to jack donkeys to produce mules. Another owner traded him for a black filly, a milk cow and $20. When Black Allan was sold to his most famous owner, James Brantley, in 1903, his purchase price was $110. He was sold without papers, but Brantley eventually recovered his registration certificate. Brantley rode Black Allan himself, and his son French Brantley sometimes rode the horse to school.

At the end of Black Allan's life, he was sold by James Brantley to Albert Dement of Wartrace, Tennessee, one of the earliest Tennessee Walking Horse breeders. The horse's price was $140, and he was sold with the guarantee that he would live through the breeding season. Dement stood Allan at stud for only a few months before Allan's death, during which the stallion was bred to 111 mares. He died at Dement's farm on September 16, 1910, at the age of 29.

== Bloodlines and offspring ==
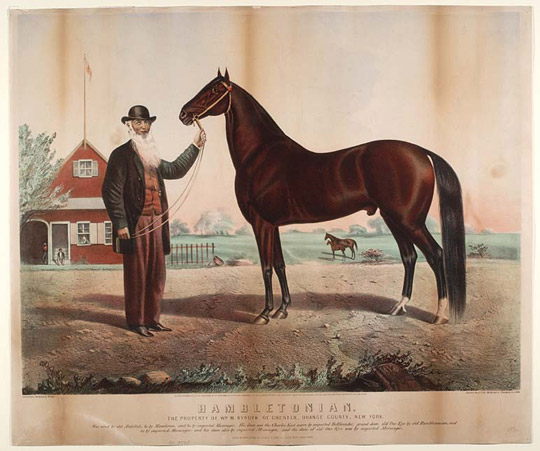
Hambletonian 10, an ancestor of Black Allan

Black Allan's pedigree traced back to Justin Morgan (Figure), the foundation sire of the Morgan breed, on his dam's side; and to Hambletonian 10, the foundation sire of the Standardbred, on his sire's side. Through Figure, his dam could also trace her sire line back to the Byerly Turk, and her dam line back to the Godolphin Arabian, two of the foundational stallions of the Thoroughbred breed, as well as lesser-known Arabian and Barb foundational bloodstock.

It is also through Figure that Black Allan's dam, Maggie Marshall, could trace her lineage back to the "Samuel Burt mare", recorded as a Thoroughbred and Narragansett Pacer cross by the Thoroughbred stallion "McCurdy's Young Wildair" (b. 1771), in turn by Wildair, a bay English Thoroughbred stallion (b. 1753) of the Godolphin Arabian line. Wildair was purchased by James De Lancey, a New York Loyalist, and imported from England to the American colonies in 1765; after 8 years standing at stud, Wildair was later resold to Edward Leedes of Yorkshire, England, in 1773.

The De Lanceys bred Wildair to the "Peter De Lancey mare" - owned by James De Lancey's father - who, in turn, was sired by the Thoroughbred stallion True Briton out of a mare by the Thoroughbred stallion Telemachus (grandson of Flying Childers, by the Darley Arabian). The resulting foal was "McCurdy's Young Wildair", a colt who was sold to Scots-Irish judge and Patriot sympathizer George Grant McCurdy of Old Lyme, Connecticut, who bred the colt to his own Narragansett Pacer mare to produce the "Samuel Burt mare".

Black Allan sired an estimated 111 foals. Three of his offspring, Roan Allen F-38, Merry Legs F-4, and Hunters Allen F-10, were given special registration numbers beginning in the designation F, which mark them as foundation bloodstock. Most of Black Allan's best offspring, including Roan Allen and Merry Legs, were produced from crosses on American Saddlebred mares, especially those from Denmark bloodlines.

Due to Black Allan's influence and potency in passing his gait and conformation to his offspring, he was given registration number F-1 when the Tennessee Walking Horse Breeders' Association, the precursor to the Tennessee Walking Horse Breeders' and Exhibitors' Association, was formed in 1935. Today, he is considered the foundation sire of the Tennessee Walking Horse breed, one of the few American breeds that names a single horse with this honor.

== Sire line tree ==
Black Allan Sire line descent tree
- Black Allan
  - Roan Allen
    - Wilson's Allen
      - Roy Wilson
      - Wilson Allen Repeat
      - The Last Wilson Allen
      - Haynes Peacock
      - Slippery Allen
        - Fulton's Wilson Allen
      - Victor Allen
      - Wartrace
      - Miller's Wilson Allen
      - Strolling Jim
      - The G Man
      - Wilson's Allen's Replica
      - Hill's Wilson's Allen
      - Sir Maugray
      - Wilson Allen Again
      - Wilson's Allen Jr
      - Wilson's Allen's Sunset Gold
      - Wilson Allen's Dictator
      - Frank Wilson
      - Gold Bond
      - King's Wilson's Allen
      - Red Warrior
      - Top Wilson
      - Wilson's Allen's Boss Man
      - Wilson's Allen's II
      - Wilson's Allen's Order
      - Billy Wilson
      - Fisher's Wilson's Allen
      - Governor Wilson
      - Hi-Boy
      - King of Haven
      - King of the Alamo
      - Limestone Wilson
      - Midnight Sun
        - Skipper Son Midnight
        - Talk of the Town
        - Midnight's Major
        - Midnight Mack
        - Sun's Quarterback
        - Sun's Jet Parade
        - Setting Sun
        - Sun's Gunsmoke
        - Sun's Delight
        - Black Go Boy Sun
        - Pride of Midnight
      - Wilson Dean
      - Wilson's Ace
      - Wilson's Allen Winchester
      - Wilson's Allen's Echo
      - Wilson's Flight Allen
      - Society Man
    - Merry Boy
      - Old Glory
        - Old Glory's Big Man
      - Merry Go Boy
        - Go Boy's Shadow
        - Go Boy's Royal Heir
        - Go Boy's Sundust
    - Hall Allen
      - Aristocratic Allen
      - Red Ace
      - Rhoda Allen
      - Hall Allen's Playboy
  - Hunter's Allen
    - Last Chance

== Pedigree ==
Pedigree of Black Allan
Sire Allendorf Standardbred	Onward; Standardbred	George Wilkes; Standardbred	Hambletonian 10; Standardbred (founder)
Sire Allendorf Standardbred	Onward; Standardbred	George Wilkes; Standardbred	Dolly Spanker; Standardbred
Sire Allendorf Standardbred	Onward; Standardbred	Dolly; Standardbred	Mambrino Chief*; Standardbred
Sire Allendorf Standardbred	Onward; Standardbred	Dolly; Standardbred	Fanny; Thoroughbred
Sire Allendorf Standardbred	Alma Mater; Standardbred	Mambrino Patchen; Standardbred	Mambrino Chief*; Standardbred
Sire Allendorf Standardbred	Alma Mater; Standardbred	Mambrino Patchen; Standardbred	Rodes Mare; Thoroughbred x Saddlebred
Sire Allendorf Standardbred	Alma Mater; Standardbred	Estella; Thoroughbred	Australian; Thoroughbred
Sire Allendorf Standardbred	Alma Mater; Standardbred	Estella; Thoroughbred	Fanny G Thoroughbred
Dam Maggie Marshall Morgan x Thoroughbred	Bradford's Telegraph ¾ Thoroughbred, ¼ Morgan	Black Hawk I Thoroughbred x Morgan	Sherman Morgan; Morgan
Dam Maggie Marshall Morgan x Thoroughbred	Bradford's Telegraph ¾ Thoroughbred, ¼ Morgan	Black Hawk I Thoroughbred x Morgan	Queen of the Neck; Thoroughbred
Dam Maggie Marshall Morgan x Thoroughbred	Bradford's Telegraph ¾ Thoroughbred, ¼ Morgan	Nathan Hardy mare Thoroughbred	Sir Walter; Thoroughbred
Dam Maggie Marshall Morgan x Thoroughbred	Bradford's Telegraph ¾ Thoroughbred, ¼ Morgan	Nathan Hardy mare Thoroughbred	Bishops Hamiltonian mare Thoroughbred
Dam Maggie Marshall Morgan x Thoroughbred	Truman Pollock mare Morgan	(unknown)	(unknown)
Dam Maggie Marshall Morgan x Thoroughbred	Truman Pollock mare Morgan	(unknown)	(unknown)
Dam Maggie Marshall Morgan x Thoroughbred	Truman Pollock mare Morgan	(unknown)	(unknown)
Dam Maggie Marshall Morgan x Thoroughbred	Truman Pollock mare Morgan	(unknown)	(unknown)

* Black Allan is inbred 4S x 4S to the stallion Mambrino Chief, meaning that he appears fourth generation twice on the sire side of his pedigree.

== Bibliography ==
- The Tennessee Walking Horse, Western Horseman, October 1994
