= Charles Brantley (horse breeder) =

American horse breeder

Charles Emmett Brantley
- Occupation: Tennessee Walking Horse breeder
- Discipline: All
- Born: November 12, 1924; Coffee County, Tennessee, US
- Died: July 22, 2016 (aged 91); Manchester, Tennessee, US
- Lifetime achievements: Inducted into Tennessee Walking Horse Hall of Fame; Inducted into Tennessee Sports Hall of Fame

Charles Emmett Brantley (November 12, 1924 – July 22, 2016) was a Tennessee Walking Horse breeder. He grew up on a farm in Coffee County, Tennessee, and competed in the first Tennessee Walking Horse National Celebration. Besides breeding horses, he was a horse trainer for several years, but quit riding due to health issues. He was married to his wife Nellie for 70 years, and was inducted into both the Tennessee Walking Horse Hall of Fame and the Tennessee Sports Hall of Fame.

== Life ==
Brantley was born on his family's farm in Coffee County, Tennessee, on November 12, 1924. He was the son of French and Mary Wilson Brantley, and grandson of James Brantley. He had two brothers and a sister. He graduated from Manchester High School in 1943. That same year, he joined the United States Navy during World War II. He rose to the rank of Construction Mechanic 2nd Class (CM2). While in the navy, he received a shaving kit sent to him by Nellie Wright, a girl he had attended school with. When the kit was stolen, he began writing to Nellie, and after his discharge they married in 1946. The couple were married 70 years.

== Career ==
Brantley's grandfather James Brantley owned the crossbred stallion Black Allan, also known as Allan F-1. Black Allan was the foundation sire of the Tennessee Walking Horse breed and the sire of Roan Allen, who was owned by the Brantley family all his life. As a consequence of this family involvement, Charles Brantley was in contact with horses from a young age, and he began showing horses as a teenager. He competed in the inaugural Tennessee Walking Horse National Celebration in 1939. Charles Brantley eventually took over his family's farm at Noah, Tennessee. Brantley owned a half interest in the notable breeding stallion and two-time World Grand Champion Midnight Sun when the horse was a colt; Midnight Sun later was sold to Harlinsdale Farm. Brantley specialized in breeding and showing his horses in hand, but he did train horses under saddle for a time. He was eventually forced to stop riding due to circulation problems, but continued to show horses in-hand until he had a knee replacement in 1982. At this time, trainer Chris Richards took over the job of showing Brantley's horses. When the Tennessee Walking Horse Breeders' and Exhibitors' Association created the Heritage Award in 1993, Brantley was the first recipient. The same year, he was given a certificate of appreciation for his contributions to the Tennessee Walking Horse National Museum. In 1999 he was inducted into the Tennessee Walking Horse Hall of Fame, and in 2002 the Tennessee Sports Hall of Fame. The latter achievement made him the first person in the Tennessee Walking Horse industry to be so honored. By 2009, Charles Brantley had attended every Celebration, and had judged the ones his horses did not show in.

== Death ==
Charles Brantley died July 22, 2016, at the age of 91. He had been in a nursing home in Manchester, Tennessee.
