= Billie Nipper =

American artist (1929–2016)

- Occupation: Horse portraitist/artist, horse breeder
- Discipline: Performance Tennessee Walking Horse
- Born: November 22, 1929; Cleveland, Tennessee
- Died: February 24, 2016 (aged 86); Cleveland, Tennessee
- Lifetime achievements: Inducted into Tennessee Walking Horse Hall of Fame and Tennessee Agriculture Hall of Fame

Website
- Official website

Billie Nipper (November 22, 1929 – February 24, 2016) was an American artist who specialized in painting portraits of horses. Nipper, a native of Cleveland, Tennessee, painted every horse that won the Tennessee Walking Horse World Grand Championship from 1976 until her death. Besides Tennessee Walking Horses, she painted other breeds of horse, as well as landscapes. Her paintings were made into prints and transferred onto china and other objects. Nipper also bred horses, and her husband and son were horse trainers.

Nipper's art was owned by Ronald Reagan and Zsa Zsa Gabor. Her paintings are in the Kentucky Horse Park in Lexington, Kentucky, and the American Quarter Horse Hall of Fame in Amarillo, Texas. Nipper was inducted into the Tennessee Walking Horse Hall of Fame and the Tennessee Agriculture Hall of Fame.

== Life and career ==
Nipper was born on November 22, 1929, in Cleveland, Tennessee. She was one of six children born to Ina Mae Arthur and John Ernest Rymer.

She married J. L. Nipper. A year after their marriage, the couple moved to Cleveland, Ohio due to J. L.'s job. Out of boredom, Nipper bought an art kit and began painting. She thought her first efforts were "horrible", but her husband liked her work and showed it to others. Nipper began to study horses in an effort to portray them more accurately. Her father-in-law was a professional horse trainer and farrier, and she began painting pictures of him at work.

Nipper's husband initially rode horses as an amateur, but he later became a professional trainer, as did his and Nipper's son, Joel. Joel Nipper first specialized in Tennessee Walking Horses, but later switched to Racking Horses, a related breed.

Nipper continued painting for her own enjoyment until one Christmas, when she gave her father-in-law a painting of his own horse as a gift. Some of his clients who saw the painting became interested in Nipper's work, and asked her to paint portraits of their own horses. She had many requests and soon began charging for her paintings.

She soon began to get commissions to paint Tennessee Walking Horses, particularly those involved in the upper levels of show competition. She personalized her paintings by taking pictures of the actual horses to use for reference and in order to show correct proportions and individual characteristics. In 1976, she began painting pictures of each Tennessee Walking Horse to win the breed's World Grand Championship, held annually as part of the Tennessee Walking Horse National Celebration. Nipper's first World Grand Champion portrait was of that year's winner Shades of Carbon, and his trainer Judy Martin. In all, she painted over 30 World Grand Champions, the last one before her death being I Am Jose.

For a time, Nipper operated in conjunction with the Tennessee Walking Horse Breeders' and Exhibitors' Association, but then went out on her own, saying, "Us artists like our independence".

Nipper had a temporary office at the Tennessee Walking Horse National Celebration each year, from which she displayed and sold her work. She had her own art gallery, and had paintings in several other art galleries in and around Cleveland.

In many of her World Grand Championship portraits, Nipper painted a montage depicting the horse's life and show career. She first used this technique for a portrait of Pride's Generator. When Nipper asked the horse's owner, Claude Crowley, if she could do a montage, Nipper said, "He said 'I don't know what that is, but why not?'" The style soon caught on and was requested by other horse owners. Nipper herself bred Tennessee Walking Horses, and once bred a mare to The Whole Nine Yards, a World Grand Champion, of whom she had previously painted a portrait. Although the portrait was painted before the horse ever won a title, Nipper depicted him with roses around his head. The horse's owner later said she almost sent the picture back.

In the mid-1970s, Nipper began to have her oil paintings made into prints, after getting requests from people who could not afford the originals. Nipper's work was also transferred onto Gorham china, decorative objects such as music boxes, and made into wallpaper borders. Besides her horse portraits, Nipper sometimes painted landscapes of rural Tennessee, as well as paintings of flowers and old barns. She continued painting privately commissioned works until the end of her career.

Nipper died in her hometown of Cleveland, Tennessee on February 24, 2016, at the age of 86. Although she had slowed down due to age, she continued painting until a few weeks before her death.

== Legacy and recognition ==
Nipper was inducted into the Tennessee Walking Horse Hall of Fame, as well as being inducted into the Tennessee Agriculture Hall of Fame. She was listed in Who's Who by the Tennessee Walking Horse Breeders' and Exhibitors' Association and was given an award for her paintings by the Walking Horse Trainers' Association. In the 1980s, she was selected to paint a horse-themed plate that was given to American president Ronald Reagan who also owned a Nipper painting on canvas. In 1982, her work was displayed in the Fine Arts Pavilion at the World's Fair in Knoxville, Tennessee. In 2012, Nipper painted an ornament that decorated the Christmas tree at the Governor of Tennessee's mansion. Nipper was also commissioned to paint pictures for Zsa Zsa Gabor and Shania Twain.

Nipper has a painting in the Kentucky Horse Park, a museum of and tribute to horses located in Lexington, Kentucky. Five of her paintings, depicting World Champion Quarter Horses are also in the American Quarter Horse Hall of Fame in Texas. While most of her work was sold in the United States, some of her paintings are in England and South America.

The city of Cleveland, Tennessee has held an annual art show in honor of Nipper each fall for over 40 years. The show is named the Nillie Bipper Arts and Crafts Festival; "Nillie Bipper" is an intentional play on Nipper's first and last names, done for humorous purposes. However, the first year the festival was held, many people called the local newspaper office to complain that the organizers had gotten Nipper's name wrong.

Nipper was also chairperson of Cleveland's Creative Guild, which promoted art within the city.
