= Pride's Generator =

- Breed: Tennessee Walking Horse
- Discipline: Show horse
- Sire: Pride of Midnight
- Grandsire: Midnight Sun
- Dam: HF Spirit's Nell
- Maternal grandsire: Spirit of Midnight
- Sex: Stallion
- Foaled: 1975
- Color: Chestnut, flaxen mane and tail
- Breeder: Harlinsdale Farm
- Owner: Claude and Linda Crowley
- Trainer: Gary Edwards

Major wins
- Two-Year-Old World Championship in 1978; Three-Year-Old World Championship in 1979; Four-Year-Old World Championship in 1980

Pride's Generator (1975–2001) was a Tennessee Walking Horse who won three World Championships before being retired to breeding. Standing at stud first at S. W. Beech Stables and later at Waterfall Farms, he sired over 2,000 foals, of which two became World Grand Champions and over 100 became World Champions.

== Life and show career ==
Pride's Generator was foaled December 2, 1975. He was a chestnut stallion with a flaxen mane and tail. He was sired by Harlinsdale Farm's Pride of Midnight; his grandsire was the two-time World Grand Champion Midnight Sun and his great-grandsire was the foundation horse Wilson's Allen. His dam was HF Spirit's Nell, who was sired by Spirit of Midnight. He was bred and foaled on Harlinsdale Farm and sold to Robert Lowe in 1977. Pride's Generator was trained by Gary Edwards. Ridden by Edwards, he won the Two-Year-Old World Championship in the 1978 Tennessee Walking Horse National Celebration. He repeated his Championship win the following year in the Three-Year-Old division, and a year later won the Four-Year-Old World Championship. During his show career he remained in training with Edwards, but had multiple owners before he was finally sold to Claude and Linda Crowley in 1984. The same year Pride's Generator was exhibited at the Los Angeles Olympic Games at the Cavalcade of Champions, not long before he began his stud career.

Pride's Generator was euthanized on July 5, 2001, after suffering colic complications. He was 25 years old.

== Breeding career and influence ==
Pride's Generator began his breeding career at S. W. Beech Stables in Belfast, Tennessee, after being sold to Claude Crowley. Since shipped semen was not available at the time, his breedings were live cover. Later, when the technology to collect semen from the stallion became available, the Crowleys chose not to use it for Pride's Generator because he was fully booked every year without it. In 1995 they moved him to Waterfall Farms just outside Shelbyville. Pride's Generator was the Tennessee Walking Horse Breeders' and Exhibitors' Association leading sire for eight years in a row, and during his life sired over 2,300 foals. Among his offspring were many notable show horses, including two World Grand Champions and over 100 World Champions. His son Gen's Armed and Dangerous won the World Grand Championship in 1993, and his son Generator's Santana won the same honor in 1997. His daughter Gen's Sundance Lady was a thirteen-time World Champion, mostly in the youth division; his son Generator's Silver Dollar was Three-Year-Old World Champion and Four-Year-Old World Champion before having a notable stud career. The Skywatch was the 1995 Three-Year-Old World Champion.

Pride's Generator grandsons have also become notable show horses; He's Puttin' on the Ritz was the 1996 World Grand Champion. Pursuing Perfection was the World Grand Champion in the 2000 Racking Horse World Celebration. The Whole Nine Yards was the Tennessee Walking Horse World Grand Champion in 2003. Santana's El Nino, a son of Generator's Santana, was the 2008 World Grand Champion, Watch It Now was the 2009 World Grand Champion, and The Coach, who was Reserve World Grand Champion to him, won the honor in 2010. I Am Jose became the first four-year-old horse in over 40 years to win the World Grand Championship in 2013, and with repeats in 2014 and 2015, one of only two horses ever to win three World Grand Championships.

== Sire line tree ==
- Pride's Generator
  - Gen's Major General
    - Jose Jose
      - I Am Jose
  - Gen's Armed and Dangerous
    - The Whole Nine Yards
  - Gen's Fable
    - Gen's Black Gin
      - Gen's Black Maverick
      - Gen A' Mighty
  - A Jazz Man
    - Master of Jazz
      - Master's Razzle and Jazz
  - Generator's Santana
    - Santana's El Nino
  - Generator's Silver Dollar
    - A Strong Dollar
      - A Strong Need For Cash
      - He's Vida Blue
      - Greenspan
      - I'm Johnny Dollar
      - Stretch Your Dollar
  - The Skywatch
    - Skywalk
    - Watch It Now
    - The Coach
