= Judy Martin =

Judy Martin may refer to:

- Judy Martin (politician), Deputy for St Helier District #1, Jersey
- Judy Martin (singer) (1917–1951), country music singer and wife of Red Foley
- Judy Martin (wrestler) (born 1955), professional wrestler
- Judy Martin (horse trainer), Tennessee Walking Horse trainer
- Judith Martin (born 1938), writer, also known as "Miss Manners"
