= Albert Dement =

- Occupation: Horse breeder
- Discipline: Tennessee Walking Horse
- Born: 1868; Cannon County, Tennessee, US
- Died: Unknown
- Lifetime achievements: Master Breeder Award

Significant horses
- Black Allan, Nell Dement, Merry Legs

Albert Dement (born 1868) was an American early Tennessee Walking Horse breeder.

== Early life ==
Albert Dement was born in Cannon County, Tennessee in 1868.

== Career ==
In 1892 Dement moved to Wartrace, in Bedford County Tennessee, and began breeding horses. Dement's main broodmare was the Tennessee Walking Horse foundation mare Nell Dement F-3. In 1910, Dement bought the stallion Black Allan from fellow horseman James Brantley, with the guarantee that the horse would live through the breeding season. From the only breeding of Nell Dement and Black Allan, Dement obtained the foundation mare Merry Legs. Dement is given credit for being the first Tennessee Walking Horse breeder to utilize scientific inbreeding.

Dement was posthumously given the Master Breeder Award by the Tennessee Walking Horse Breeders' and Exhibitors' Association. His farm, with three barns he built, remains in his family and has been designated as a Tennessee Century Farm, meaning that it has been owned by the same family for more than a century.
