= Strolling Jim =

American show horse

- Breed: Tennessee Walking Horse
- Discipline: Show horse
- Sire: Wilson's Allen
- Grandsire: Roan Allen
- Dam: Allen's Strolling Jennie
- Sex: Gelding
- Foaled: 1936
- Country: United States
- Color: Chestnut, hind sock, star, snip
- Breeder: Ed Gilliam
- Trainer: Floyd Carothers

Honors
- First Tennessee Walking Horse World Grand Champion

Strolling Jim (1936–1954) was the first Tennessee Walking Horse to become World Grand Champion of his breed. (Note: When the Tennessee Walking Horse National Celebration was founded in 1939, the largest honor was referred to as the National Championship. For the 1945 Celebration, it was changed to the World Grand Championship, which it has been known as since. Horses which won the National Championship are listed with the World Grand Champions on official records.) Since Strolling Jim's death, a restaurant, street, and an annual ultramarathon in his hometown of Wartrace, Tennessee have been named after him.

== Life ==
Strolling Jim was foaled in 1936 near Viola, Tennessee, and was bred by Ed Gilliam. Strolling Jim was sired by Wilson's Allen and out of Allen's Strolling Jennie. Through his sire he was half-brother to Midnight Sun and Haynes Peacock. He was a chestnut with a left hind sock, star, and snip on his nose.

Strolling Jim was first trained to pull a wagon and a plow by Jim Rose. Like many horses at the time, he was used as a working farm horse until he was seen by a well-known Walking Horse trainer at the time, Floyd Carothers. Carothers thought the young gelding had potential, bought him for $350 and took him into training.

Strolling Jim was a three-year-old in 1939, when the first Tennessee Walking Horse National Celebration was held in Wartrace. He was shown by Floyd Carothers and the pair won the World Grand Championship.

After his win, Strolling Jim was sold multiple times and finally sold out of state to a farm in California. From there he went to Pennsylvania, where he had a successful show career, before being flown back to Tennessee in 1947. There he was given to Carothers' widow, Olive. She showed him in a ladies' class in the 1948 Celebration, which was his final show before his retirement.

Strolling Jim died April 23, 1957, and was buried by his stables behind the Walking Horse Hotel owned by Mrs. Carothers in Wartrace. His grave, with engraved headstone, can still be viewed today.

== Legacy ==
A color portrait of Strolling Jim, painted in 1940 by Bill Humphreys, is on display in the Tennessee Walking Horse National Museum, along with the leather saddle Strolling Jim wore at the 1939 Celebration.

In the late 1990s, some guests at the Walking Horse Hotel reported seeing Strolling Jim's ghost "prancing" around by his old stables on New Year's Eve. The restaurant at the hotel was named the Strolling Jim Restaurant after a renovation in 2007.

An annual 40-mile ultramarathon held in Wartrace is named in the horse's honor, and there is a street named Strolling Jim Drive in the nearby town of Shelbyville, Tennessee.

== Pedigree ==
Pedigree of Strolling Jim
Sire Wilson's Allen	Roan Allen	Black Allan	Allendorf
Sire Wilson's Allen	Roan Allen	Black Allan	Maggie Marshall
Sire Wilson's Allen	Roan Allen	Gertrude	Royal Denmark
Sire Wilson's Allen	Roan Allen	Gertrude	Ball II
Sire Wilson's Allen	Birdie Messick	Black Allan	Allendorf
Sire Wilson's Allen	Birdie Messick	Black Allan	Maggie Marshall
Sire Wilson's Allen	Birdie Messick	Nellie	Walking Dan Allen
Sire Wilson's Allen	Birdie Messick	Nellie	Unknown
Dam Allens Strolling Jennie	Maberry Allen	Roan Allen	Black Allan
Dam Allens Strolling Jennie	Maberry Allen	Roan Allen	Gertrude
Dam Allens Strolling Jennie	Maberry Allen	Mayberry	Kendal
Dam Allens Strolling Jennie	Maberry Allen	Mayberry	Queen May
Dam Allens Strolling Jennie	Unknown	Unknown	Unknown
Dam Allens Strolling Jennie	Unknown	Unknown	Unknown
Dam Allens Strolling Jennie	Unknown	Unknown	Unknown
Dam Allens Strolling Jennie	Unknown	Unknown	Unknown

== Notes ==
..
