= Judy Martin (horse trainer) =

Tennessee Walking Horse trainer

- Occupation: Horse trainer
- Discipline: Performance Tennessee Walking Horse
- Major wins/Championships: Three-Year-Old World Championship in 1973; Four-Year-Old World Championship in 1974; World Grand Championship in 1976
- Lifetime achievements: 1976 Trainer of the Year

Significant horses
- Shades of Carbon

Judy Martin (July 14, 1944 – November 14, 2025) was a Tennessee Walking Horse trainer. Martin trained the World Grand Champion Shades of Carbon, and was Tennessee Walking Horse Trainer of the Year in 1976. She also judged horse shows.

== Life and career ==
Judy Wiser was born to Winston Wiser and his wife Katherine. Winston Wiser was a notable Tennessee Walking Horse trainer who won five World Grand Championships on three horses, including Merry Go Boy and Go Boy's Shadow. Judy married Joe Martin. The couple ran a training and show stable in Shelbyville, Tennessee, and trained the black stallion Shades of Carbon, who was owned by Glen Loe. Originally ridden in shows by Joe Martin, Shades of Carbon won the Two-Year-Old World Championship at the Tennessee Walking Horse National Celebration in 1972. The following year, Judy Martin took over Shades of Carbon's training. She showed him to the Three-Year-Old World Championship in 1973, and the Four-Year-Old World Championship in 1974. In the spring of 1975 Mark of Carbon and Martin won the stake in the Spring Celebration.

Shades of Carbon won the World Grand Championship in 1976, making Martin only the second woman to win the stake, after Betty Sain in 1966. Martin said after the win, "I don't feel any different from any other trainer. I compete against these boys all the time." In 1976, Judy Martin was named Trainer of the Year by the Walking Horse Trainers' Association.

After her World Grand Championship, Martin continued to train and compete in the Celebration. She also judged Tennessee Walking Horses in shows, from small one-day competitions to major shows including the Celebration. In 2003 she was named director of judges for the National Horse Show Commission. She died in Shelbyville, TN on November 14, 2025.
