= Winston Wiser =

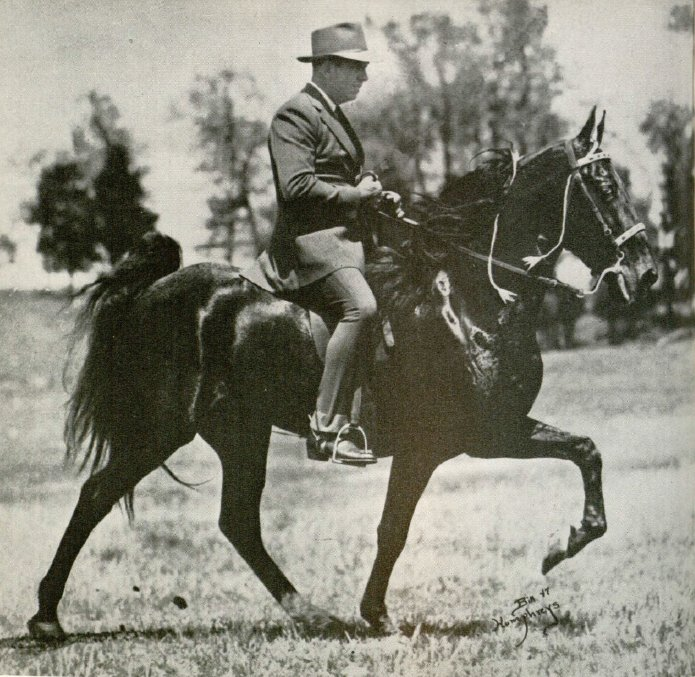
- Wiser on Merry Go Boy in 1947
- Occupation: Horse trainer
- Discipline: Performance Tennessee Walking Horse
- Born: January 23, 1910; Bedford County, Tennessee
- Died: March 31, 1961 (aged 51); Shelbyville, Tennessee
- Major wins/Championships: World Grand Championship in 1943; World Grand Championship in 1947; World Grand Championship in 1948; World Grand Championship in 1955; World Grand Championship in 1956

Significant horses
- Black Angel, Merry Go Boy, Go Boy's Shadow

Winston Wiser (1910–1961) was a Tennessee Walking Horse trainer from Shelbyville, Tennessee, who won five World Grand Championships on three separate horses.

== Life ==
Wiser was born in Bedford County, Tennessee on January 23, 1910, to James Daniel Wiser and Laura Ferrell Wiser. He later married Katherine Morris. The couple had 3 children, including a daughter, Judy, who also became a horse trainer and won the World Grand Championship in 1976.

== Career ==
Wiser began his career training horses on his family's farm in Wartrace, Tennessee, where his stables, Wiser's Walking Horse Stables, were later located. Wiser won a total of 5 World Grand Championships at the Tennessee Walking Horse National Celebration in his career, beginning with the mare Black Angel in 1943. Wiser trained and partly owned the stallion Merry Go Boy, who was bred by Wiser's brother Archie. Shown by Winston Wiser, Merry Go Boy won the Weanling Colt class in the 1943 Celebration. The next year he was the Yearling Colt winner, and was the Three-Year-Old World Champion in 1946. The same year Wiser showed him in the World Grand Championship for the first time, but the pair were defeated by Midnight Sun. Wiser and Merry Go Boy returned to the World Grand Championship in 1947 and won. They repeated the following year, which was the first time the Celebration was held on its specifically-built Celebration Grounds in Shelbyville. Wiser won his fourth World Grand Championship on Go Boy's Shadow, a son of Merry Go Boy, in 1955. The next year, 1956, he and Go Boy's Shadow won the class again. It proved to be Wiser's final championship before his death. Wiser remains the only person ever to win 5 World Grand Championships in the Tennessee Walking Horse industry.

== Death ==
Wiser was shot to death by his then-16-year-old daughter Judy the last day of March, 1961, during a family argument at their home in Shelbyville, Tennessee. A judge later ruled that the pistol shooting was justifiable homicide, as Wiser had threatened Judy and her mother. Wiser and Katherine had been separated prior to the altercation. Wiser was 51.
