= Merry Walker =

Tennessee Walking Horse mare (foaled 1939)

- Breed: Tennessee Walking Horse
- Discipline: Show horse, broodmare
- Sire: Merry Boy
- Dam: Earthman's Queen Mary
- Sex: Mare
- Foaled: 1939
- Color: Black, hind socks
- Breeder: Harold Earthman
- Owner: Dr. Porter Rodgers

Merry Walker (foaled 1939) was a Tennessee Walking Horse mare. She gave birth to the show horses Go Boy's Shadow and Rodger's Perfection, who won three World Grand Championships between them.

== Life ==
Merry Walker was foaled June 18, 1939, in Murfreesboro, Tennessee. She was a black mare with white hind socks, bred by Harold Earthman. She was sired by the Tennessee Walking Horse stallion Merry Boy and out of a Standardbred mare, Earthman's Queen Mary. In 1941 Merry Walker was sold to a Texas owner for $500. Merry Walker was bought by H. Thompson, father to World Grand Champion trainer Vic Thompson, in 1944. The same year, he showed her in the Tennessee Walking Horse National Celebration. She placed fifth in the World Grand Championship.

Merry Walker foundered before being sold to Dr. Porter Rodgers of Searcy, Arkansas, in 1945, but still brought a price of $2,000. She gave birth to eight foals in her life: Sun's Dark Lady, Merry Earthman, Go Boy's Shadow, Anne's Merry, Rodgers' Perfection, Shadow's Sis W, Sensational Sue R, and Merry Walker's Doll. Merry Walker's son by Merry Go Boy, Go Boy's Shadow, won the Two-Year-Old World Championship in the Celebration. In 1955, he won the World Grand Championship and repeated the win a year later. Another of Merry Walker's sons, Rodgers' Perfection, won the World Grand Championship in 1959. He was sired by Midnight Mack K. A daughter of Merry Walker, Shadow's Sis W, foaled the 1978 World Grand Champion Mark of Carbon.

Merry Walker is the only Tennessee Walking Horse broodmare to ever produce two World Grand Champions. It is also significant to note that the winning offspring were sired by different stallions.
