= Charles Brantley =

Charles Brantley may refer to:

- Charles Brantley (horse breeder) (1924–2016), Tennessee Walking Horse breeder
- Charles Brantley (American football) (fl. 2010s–20202s), American college football cornerback

== See also ==
- Charles Brantley Aycock (1859–1912), governor of the U.S. state of North Carolina
