= Merry Go Boy =

World Grand Champion horse

- Merry Go Boy
- Breed: Tennessee Walking Horse
- Discipline: Show horse
- Sire: Merry Boy
- Grandsire: Roan Allen
- Dam: Wiser's Dimples
- Maternal grandsire: Giovanni
- Sex: Stallion
- Foaled: 1943
- Country: United States
- Color: Black, star and left hind sock
- Breeder: Archie Wiser
- Trainer: Winston Wiser

Major wins
- World Grand Championships in 1947, 1948

Merry Go Boy (May 4, 1943 – July 7, 1967) was a highly influential Tennessee Walking Horse sire and two-time World Grand Champion. He is credited for producing the most desirable conformation type in his offspring.

== Life ==
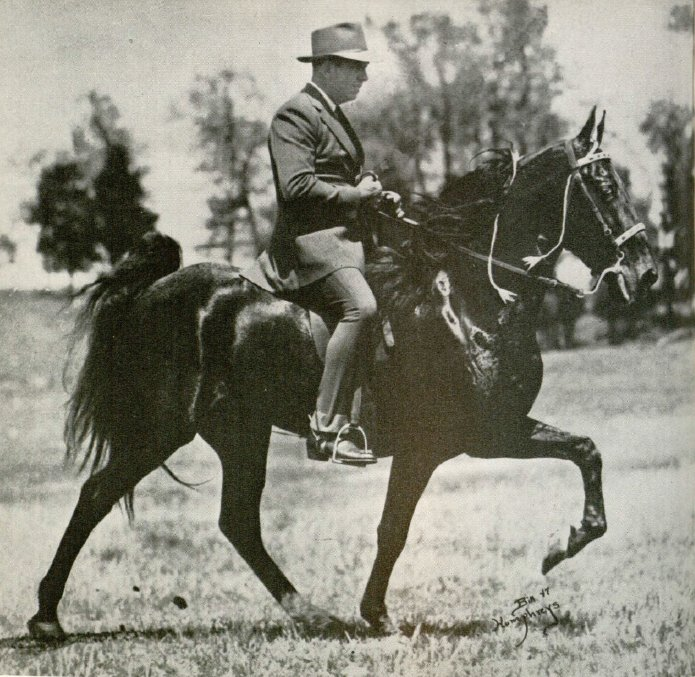
Merry Go Boy under saddle c. 1947

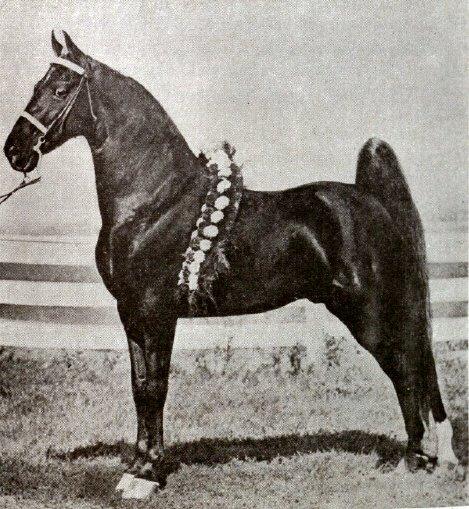
Merry Go Boy wearing a championship wreath

Merry Go Boy was foaled on May 4, 1943. He was sired by the stallion Merry Boy, and out of a mare named Wiser's Dimples. Merry Go Boy was black with a white star and near hind sock. He was bred by Archie Wiser of Wartrace, Tennessee, and sold to Wiser's brother Winston for $350 when he was a few weeks old. In 1944, Elroy Mallard from Georgetown, Kentucky bought a half-interest in Merry Go Boy. In 1948, Merry Go Boy was sold again to a Virginia owner for a then-record price of $55,000. Merry Go Boy was euthanized due to arthritis on July 7, 1967, at Belfast, Tennessee.

== Career ==
Merry Go Boy won the weanling horse colt class at the Tennessee Walking Horse National Celebration in 1943. In 1944, he won the yearling colt class and the yearling championship. He won the two-year-old stallion class in 1945, and in the following year, 1946, won the three-year-old stallion/gelding junior stake and was then entered in the "big stake" or World Grand Championship, which he lost to Midnight Sun. However, Merry Go Boy won the World Grand Championship title a year afterwards, in 1947, and again in 1948.

Merry Go Boy's last major win was in 1967, when he won the get of sire class at the Celebration.

== Offspring ==
After his retirement from showing, Merry Go Boy was put to stud in 1954 at S.W. Beech's stables. He sired three World Grand Champions: Go Boy's Shadow, winner in 1955 and 1956 with Winston Wiser; Go Boy's Sundust, winner in 1967; and Go Boy's Royal Heir, winner in 1968. In the 1960 Breeders' National Futurity, 24 of the 46 awards were given to sons and daughters of Merry Go Boy, although it is not known what became of these horses after they matured. Merry Go Boy is credited with popularizing his black color and fine conformation within his breed.

Sire line descent tree
- Merry Go Boy
  - Go Boy's Shadow
    - Shadows Shadow
      - Sensational Shadow
  - Go Boy's Royal Heir
  - Go Boy's Sundust

== Pedigree ==
Pedigree of Merry Go Boy
Sire Merry Boy	Roan Allen	Black Allan*	Allendorf*
Sire Merry Boy	Roan Allen	Black Allan*	Maggie Marshall*
Sire Merry Boy	Roan Allen	Gertrude	Royal Denmark
Sire Merry Boy	Roan Allen	Gertrude	Ball II
Sire Merry Boy	Merry Legs	Black Allan*	Allendorf*
Sire Merry Boy	Merry Legs	Black Allan*	Maggie Marshall*
Sire Merry Boy	Merry Legs	Nell Dement	Donald
Sire Merry Boy	Merry Legs	Nell Dement	Flax
Dam Wiser's Dimples	Giovanni	Dandy Jim II	McDonald Chief
Dam Wiser's Dimples	Giovanni	Dandy Jim II	Lady Mc
Dam Wiser's Dimples	Giovanni	Francesca	Joel
Dam Wiser's Dimples	Giovanni	Francesca	Mabel
Dam Wiser's Dimples	Wiser's Minnie	Black Allan*	Allendorf*
Dam Wiser's Dimples	Wiser's Minnie	Black Allan*	Maggie Marshall*
Dam Wiser's Dimples	Wiser's Minnie	Wiser's Molly	(unknown)
Dam Wiser's Dimples	Wiser's Minnie	Wiser's Molly	(unknown)

* Merry Go Boy is inbred 3S x 3S x 3D to the stallion Black Allan, meaning that he appears third generation twice on the sire side of his pedigree and third once generation on the dam side of his pedigree.
