= Link Webb =

- Birth name: Lincoln Eugene Webb
- Occupation: Horse trainer
- Discipline: Performance Tennessee Walking Horse
- Born: 1974 (age 50–51)
- Major wins/Championships: World Grand Championship in 2008
- Lifetime achievements: Trainer of the Year in 2005

Significant horses
- Santana's El Nino

Lincoln "Link" Webb (born 1974) is a Tennessee Walking Horse trainer. He and the black stallion Santana's El Nino won the breed's World Grand Championship in 2008.

== Life and career ==
Webb was born Lincoln Eugene Webb in 1974, but nicknamed Link. He owns and operates Link Webb Stables in Marshall County, Tennessee, and was named Trainer of the Year by the Walking Horse Trainers' Association in 2005. He trained the black Tennessee Walking Horse stallion Santana's El Nino. In 2007, Webb and El Nino entered the World Grand Championship in the Tennessee Walking Horse National Celebration and placed fourth. A short time later, they won the stake class in the International World Championship Walking Horse Show in Murfreesboro, Tennessee. Returning to the Celebration in 2008, they placed second in the aged stallion class and then entered the World Grand Championship. El Nino was not the favorite horse to win, being described by newspaper reporters as a "dark horse", but he and Webb placed first out of the eight competing horses.

Link Webb is married to his wife Rae Ellen. They have a son, Lane Webb.
