= Out On Parole =

Tennessee Walking Horse

- Breed: Tennessee Walking Horse
- Discipline: Show horse
- Sire: Pusher's Doing Time
- Dam: Pride's Golden Doll
- Sex: Stallion
- Foaled: March 25, 1997
- Color: Black roan, blaze, left hind sock
- Breeder: Judy Moore
- Owner: Randall and Sadie Baskins
- Trainer: Steve Dunn

Major wins
- Two-Year-Old World Championship in 1999; Reserve Three-Year-Old World Championship in 2000; Four-Year-Old World Championship in 2001; World Grand Championship in 2002

Out On Parole (1997–2018) was a Tennessee Walking Horse who won the World Grand Championship in the 2002 Tennessee Walking Horse National Celebration.

== Life and career ==
Out On Parole was a black roan stallion with a white blaze on his face and a white sock on his left hind foot, sired by Pusher's Doing Time and out of the mare Pride's Golden Doll. He was foaled on March 25, 1997 and bred by Judy Moore of Shelbyville, Tennessee. He was sold to Bob Kilgore as a yearling, then sold to Pete Hammond, who sold him to Randall and Sadie Baskins. The Baskins owned him from his two-year-old year until his death. Out On Parole was trained by Bud Dunn and Son Stables of Florence, Alabama. Bud Dunn trained Out On Parole to canter, but as he was working with RPM, his second World Grand Champion at the time, his son Steve Dunn was Out On Parole's primary trainer. Steve Dunn rode Out On Parole in the 1999 Tennessee Walking Horse National Celebration and won the Two-Year-Old World Championship. The following year he won the Three-Year-Old preliminary class but came in reserve in the World Championship. In 2001, Out On Parole was the Four-Year-Old World Champion. The next year he won Division A of the Stallions Class, the traditional first test of horses entering the World Grand Championship, and was one of 11 horses entered in the World Grand Championship. Bud Dunn had died in early 2001, and for the big stake Steve Dunn wore the tie his father had worn during both of his World Grand Championship wins. Out On Parole was named the World Grand Champion for 2002. Following the win, he was exhibited at many horse shows and once performed at the University of Tennessee homecoming football game. He was officially retired at the Celebration in 2013, although he continued to be used for breeding. One of his sons, First Parole, was a World Champion.

Out On Parole died January 21, 2018. He had developed a tumor and was undergoing surgery to remove it, but died on the operating table.
