= RPM (horse) =

Tennessee Walking Horse

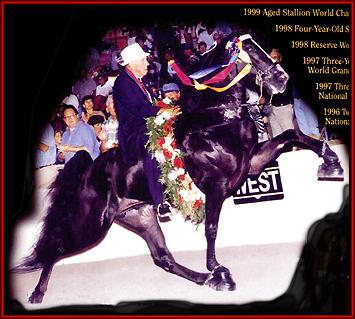
- RPM winning the World Grand Championship in 1999
- Breed: Tennessee Walking Horse
- Sire: Dark Spirit's Rebel
- Dam: Ebony's Emmy Lou
- Sex: Stallion
- Color: Black
- Owner: Pete Hammond & Bob Kilgore; TR & N Partners; Jaclyn Smith
- Trainer: Bud Dunn

Major wins
- Three-Year-Old World Championship in 1997; Four-Year-Old World Championship in 1998; Reserve World Grand Championship in 1998; World Grand Championship in 1999

RPM was a Tennessee Walking Horse who won a World Grand Championship in 1999. As a four-year-old, RPM was sold for $1.25 million, estimated at the time to be the highest price ever paid for a Tennessee Walking Horse. RPM was trained by Bud Dunn, who also trained the horse's sire to a World Grand Championship in 1992.

== Life and career ==
RPM was a black stallion sired by Dark Spirit's Rebel, the 1992 World Grand Champion Tennessee Walking Horse, and out of Ebony's Emmy Lou. As a yearling, RPM was sold to Pete Hammond and Bob Kilgore for $100,000 and put in training with Bud Dunn of Florence, Alabama, who had also trained Dark Spirit's Rebel. Dunn showed RPM to the three-year-old World Championship at the 1997 Tennessee Walking Horse National Celebration and the four-year-old World Championship in 1998. The same year, RPM was entered in the open World Grand Championship and won reserve. Dunn was aiming RPM at the World Grand Championship the next year. However, in May 1999, RPM was sold to TR & N Partners for $1.25 million, making him one of only 5 Tennessee Walking Horses to ever be sold for over one million dollars. At the time, it was estimated that RPM's price might be the highest ever paid for a Tennessee Walking Horse. The new owners moved him to Sammy Day's stable in Shelbyville, Tennessee. Shortly before the Celebration, Day was convicted of bribing a judge at a different show, fined and put on suspension. RPM was returned to Dunn's training and won the World Grand Championship. In 2000, RPM was retired to stud at Bridlewood Farm and then sold to Jaclyn Smith in 2005. Smith moved RPM to Rising Star Ranch near Shelbyville. RPM was found sick on the morning of July 20, 2005. He was being taken to the University of Tennessee veterinary hospital when he died of an obstructed bowel caused by colic complications.

== Pedigree ==
Pedigree of RPM
Sire Dark Spirit's Rebel	Pride's Dark Spirit	Pride of Midnight*	Midnight Sun*
Sire Dark Spirit's Rebel	Pride's Dark Spirit	Pride of Midnight*	Pride of Stanley*
Sire Dark Spirit's Rebel	Pride's Dark Spirit	Spirit of Merry Boy	Spirit of Midnight
Sire Dark Spirit's Rebel	Pride's Dark Spirit	Spirit of Merry Boy	Marilyn J
Sire Dark Spirit's Rebel	Bridle Vale Penny	Reyclif Merry Junior	Reyclif Merry Allen
Sire Dark Spirit's Rebel	Bridle Vale Penny	Reyclif Merry Junior	Baby Ray
Sire Dark Spirit's Rebel	Bridle Vale Penny	Bridle Vale Twinkle	Wilson's Atomic
Sire Dark Spirit's Rebel	Bridle Vale Penny	Bridle Vale Twinkle	First Chance Lady
Dam Ebony's Emmy Lou	Pride's Silver Gold	Pride of Midnight*	Midnight Sun*
Dam Ebony's Emmy Lou	Pride's Silver Gold	Pride of Midnight*	Pride of Stanley*
Dam Ebony's Emmy Lou	Pride's Silver Gold	Miss Ebony Bell	Ebony Masterpiece*
Dam Ebony's Emmy Lou	Pride's Silver Gold	Miss Ebony Bell	Bel Aire
Dam Ebony's Emmy Lou	Another Dimple	Another Masterpiece	Ebony Masterpiece*
Dam Ebony's Emmy Lou	Another Dimple	Another Masterpiece	Pride's Elegant Lady
Dam Ebony's Emmy Lou	Another Dimple	Ebony's Dimple Allen	Ebony Masterpiece*
Dam Ebony's Emmy Lou	Another Dimple	Ebony's Dimple Allen	Sheila

* RPM is inbred 3S × 3D to the stallion Pride of Midnight, meaning that he appears third generation on the sire side of his pedigree and third generation on the dam side of his pedigree.

* RPM is inbred 4D × 4D x 4D to the stallion Ebony Masterpiece, meaning that he appears thirce in fourth generation on the dam side of his pedigree.
