= Merry Legs =

- Merry Legs (right) with Huda Dement
- Breed: Tennessee Walking Horse
- Discipline: Show horse
- Sire: Black Allan
- Grandsire: Allendorf
- Dam: Nell Dement
- Sex: Mare
- Foaled: 1911
- Died: 1932 (aged 20–21)
- Color: Bay
- Breeder: Albert Dement

Honors
- Given foundation registration F-4

Merry Legs (1911–1932) was a Tennessee Walking Horse mare who was given foundation registration for her influence as a broodmare. She was also a successful show horse.

== Life ==
Merry Legs was foaled in April 1911. She was a bay with sabino markings. She was sired by the foundation stallion Black Allan F-1, out of the American Saddlebred mare Nell Dement, registration number F-3, and bred by the early breeder Albert Dement. She was a large mare at maturity, standing 15.2 hands (62 inches, 157 cm) high and weighing 1,200 pounds (540 kg). Merry Legs was a successful show horse; as a three-year-old, she won the stake class at the Tennessee State Fair. She was also successful as a broodmare, giving birth to 13 foals, among them the well-known Bud Allen, Last Chance, Major Allen, and Merry Boy. For her influence on the breed, she was given the foundation number F-4 when the TWHBEA was formed in 1935. She died in 1932.
