= Sam Paschal =

- Occupation: Horse trainer
- Discipline: Performance Tennessee Walking Horse
- Major wins/Championships: Reserve World Grand Championship in 1956; World Grand Championship in 1958; World Grand Championship in 1962; World Grand Championship in 1963; Reserve World Grand Championship in 1965

Significant horses
- Setting Sun; Ebony Masterpiece; Sun's Delight D Johnny Midnight

Sam Paschal was a Tennessee Walking Horse trainer from Murfreesboro, Tennessee. Paschal trained three horses who won the breed's World Grand Championship.

== Career ==
Paschal operated a training stable in Murfreesboro, Tennessee. Paschal's first notable horse was Setting Sun. In 1956, he showed the stallion in the Tennessee Walking Horse National Celebration and placed third in the World Grand Championship. The following year, Setting Sun was the Reserve World Grand Champion. In 1958, Setting Sun and Paschal won the World Grand Championship.

His second World Grand Championship came in 1962, with Ebony Masterpiece. He won his third World Grand Championship with Sun's Delight D, in 1963.

In 1965 Paschal was given the task of training a horse named Johnny Midnight, who was a full brother to Setting Sun. Although he was expected to do well in the Celebration, Johnny Midnight's best win was Reserve World Grand Champion, after first-place winner Triple Threat.

A fellow horseman who often saw Paschal ride said, "When Paschal went into the ring, he was in a class by himself." Paschal was used as a model for the rider in a painting of the "perfect Tennessee Walking Horse" commissioned by the Celebration.
