= Cash for Keeps =

American horse

- Breed: Tennessee Walking Horse
- Discipline: Show horse
- Sire: Coin's Hard Cash
- Sex: Stallion
- Color: Chestnut
- Breeder: Bonnie Cady
- Owner: Morrison Stables
- Trainer: Sammy Day; Ray Gilmer

Major wins
- Four-Year-Old World Championship in 1995; World Grand Championship in 2000; Plantation Lite-Shod World Championship in 2006

Cash for Keeps is a Tennessee Walking Horse who won the World Grand Championship in the 2000 Tennessee Walking Horse National Celebration. He returned to competition 6 years later and won Plantation Lite-Shod World Championships with both Ray Gilmer and Dr. Jeanne Morrison.

== Life and career ==
Cash for Keeps is a chestnut stallion foaled in 1991. He was bred by Bonnie Cady, and was sired by the World Grand Champion Coin's Hard Cash, out of the mare Pride's Georgia Peach. His maternal grandsire was Harlinsdale Farm's notable sire Pride of Midnight. Cash for Keeps was purchased by the Harrell Brawner family of Wynne, Arkansas in 1994 and initially trained by Sammy Day. Ridden by Day, he won the four-year-old preliminary class in the 1995 Tennessee Walking Horse National Celebration and followed up by winning the World Championship for that age division. In 1997 the Brawners moved Cash for Keeps to Ray Gilmer's West Tennessee stable so he would be closer to their home. By 2000 Cash for Keeps had made several bids for the World Grand Championship, and the Brawners had publicly announced that if he did not win that year, they would retire him. When Cash for Keeps won, Gilmer had been training for 28 years and had never thought he would actually win the World Grand Championship. Following the World Grand Championship, Gilmer and Cash for Keeps made appearances at multiple horse shows across the Southeast and signed autographs at the Celebration Grounds. One year after his win, Cash for Keeps was formally retired in a ceremony at the 2001 Celebration. He wore his sire's horse blanket and was ridden by Gilmer to the song "Remember Me" from the Coyote Ugly movie soundtrack. At the end of the ceremony Gilmer dismounted, attached the reins to the saddle so they could not drag or catch Cash for Keeps' feet, and allowed the horse to exit the arena by himself. Gilmer and Falcon Ridge Farm purchased Cash for Keeps and stood him at stud for a few years following his retirement from showing. In late 2004 Cash for Keeps was sold to Morrison Stables, Hattiesburg, Mississippi. In 2006, five years after being retired and at the age of 15, Cash for Keeps entered the Celebration again and, ridden by Gilmer, won the Plantation Lite-Shod World Championship. It was the first time in Celebration history a horse had won a flat-shod World Championship after winning the World Grand Championship. Gilmer said after the win, "A great horse should be able to excel at any level of show ring competition. All the pads and action devices should do is enhance a horse's natural gait." He also noted that he had wanted to show Cash for Keeps in a different division for several years to demonstrate the horse's ability.
