= Santana's El Nino =

Show horse

- Breed: Tennessee Walking Horse
- Discipline: Show horse
- Sire: Generator's Santana
- Grandsire: Pride's Generator
- Dam: The Pusher's Lucky Lady
- Maternal grandsire: The Pusher
- Sex: Stallion
- Foaled: May 1, 2001
- Color: Black
- Breeder: Michael and Ann Jones
- Owner: Michael and Ann Jones
- Trainer: Link Webb

Major wins
- World Grand Championship in 2008

Santana's El Nino is a Tennessee Walking Horse who won the World Grand Championship in the 2008 Tennessee Walking Horse National Celebration. He was trained by Link Webb.

== Life and career ==
Santana's El Nino is a black stallion sired by the 1997 World Grand Champion Generator's Santana and out of the mare The Pusher's Lucky Lady. His paternal grandsire was Pride's Generator, his damsire was World Grand Champion The Pusher. He was foaled on May 1, 2001. He was bred and is owned by Michael and Ann Jones of Lafayette, Georgia and trained by Link Webb of Marshall County, Tennessee. Webb and Santana's El Nino won the 15.2 and Under World Championship in the 2007 Tennessee Walking Horse National Celebration. In the 2008 Celebration Santana's El Nino placed second in the A division of the aged stallion class, behind the winner Jose's Intimidator, who was ridden by Jamie Bradshaw. Many show attendees predicted that the World Grand Champion that year would be either Jose's Intimidator or Rowdy Rev, trained by Bill Bobo. A total of eight horses were entered, and when the final results were called Santana's El Nino was the World Grand Champion. Jose's Intimidator was the Reserve World Grand Champion and Rowdy Rev placed third. Following his win, Santana's El Nino was retired to stud.
