= Bud Dunn =

American racehorse trainer

- Birth name: Emerson Dunn
- Occupation: Horse trainer
- Discipline: Performance Tennessee Walking Horse (Note: Within the Tennessee Walking Horse breed, "Performance" denotes a horse that is shown with pads on its feet to enhance its gait. This is the style used in the World Grand Championship and many smaller championships.)
- Born: May 15, 1918; Scott County, Kentucky, U.S.
- Died: January 21, 2001 (aged 82); Florence, Alabama, U.S.
- Resting place: Oakwood Cemetery, Sheffield, Alabama
- Major wins/Championships: World Grand Championship (1992, 1999); Three-Year-Old World Championship (1970, 1997); Four-Year-Old World Championship (1998); Reserve World Grand Championship (1998)

Honors
- Trainer of the Year (1980, 1991); Walking Horse Hall of Fame, 1987; Lauderdale County Sports Hall of Fame, 2003

Significant horses
- Sundust Royal Flush, Stock Exchange, Yankee Delight, Dark Spirit's Rebel, RPM, Broken Promises, Out On Parole

Emerson "Bud" Dunn (May 15, 1918 – January 11, 2001) was a Tennessee Walking Horse trainer from Kentucky who spent most of his career in northern Alabama. He trained horses for over forty years and won his first Tennessee Walking Horse World Grand Championship at age 74 with Dark Spirit's Rebel; at the time, he was the oldest rider to win the honor. He was inducted into the Tennessee Walking Horse Hall of Fame in 1987 and named trainer of the year in 1980 and 1991. In 1999 at age 81, Dunn surpassed his own record for the oldest winning rider by winning his second World Grand Championship, riding RPM. He died of a heart attack in January 2001.

== Life and career ==
Dunn was born on May 15, 1918, in Scott County, Kentucky, near Lexington, the second child and only son of Lucius and Sadie Burgess Dunn. He was named Emerson but was generally known as "Bud". Horses played a large part in his early life, and he later said that he "came into the world around them". Dunn began training horses in his teens, and in 1951 he began to specialize in training Tennessee Walking Horses, a gaited breed often ridden in saddle seat competition, noted for its unique "running walk".

Dunn's training facility, Bud Dunn Stables, (later Bud Dunn and Son Stables) was in Florence, Alabama, on a ten-acre property. Dunn moved to north Alabama from Georgia in the 1950s, and bought out another trainer who was quitting the horse business. By the mid-1980s, Dunn had over 50 horses in training at a time, and had several full-time employees. He also judged Tennessee Walking Horse shows, including the Spring Celebration, an annual Tennessee Walking Horse show in Shelbyville, Tennessee, that is traditionally popular with trainers who hope to enter horses in the National Celebration later in the year.

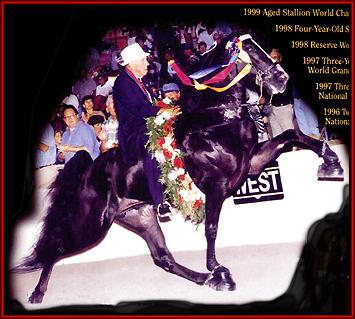
Bud Dunn exhibiting RPM, winning the World Grand Championship in 1999 at age 81.

Dunn trained and showed Tennessee Walking Horses for 50 years, and during his career won two World Grand Championships and 20 World Championships with various horses, competing in 125 to 150 horse shows a year. Dunn participated in the breed's major annual horse show, the Tennessee Walking Horse National Celebration, nearly every year from 1950. By 1993 he was so popular that he often signed autographs for several hours before a performance. In total, Dunn personally showed 108 horses at the Celebration, and several hundred others which he trained were shown by other riders. Among them was Sundust Royal Flush, a stallion who, at the 1970 Celebration, won both the Preliminary Stallion class and the Three-Year-Old World Championship. Among other winning horses were Stock Exchange, who won the Junior Stallion Championship at the Dixie Jubilee in Baton Rouge, Louisiana, in 1984, and Yankee Delight, who won the Grand Championship at the same show. Dunn rode both horses to their wins. Among horses that were trained by Dunn but ridden by amateur riders, Delight Puff and Stuff was Amateur Champion, and Aces Executive was Ladies' Champion, also in 1984.

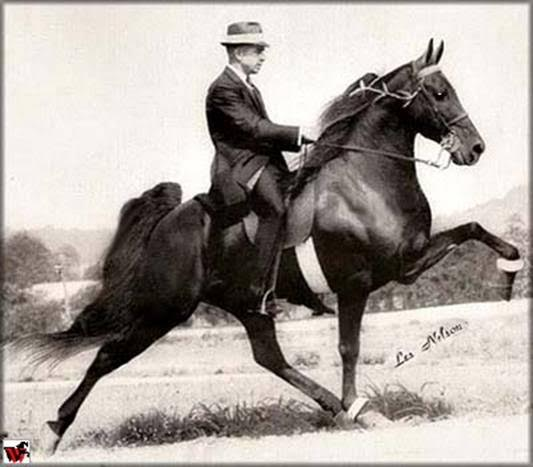
Bud Dunn exhibiting the three-year-old Tennessee Walking Horse stallion Go Boy's Sundust in Jackson, Mississippi.

Despite Dunn's success, he did not ride a winning horse to the World Grand Championship until 1992; fellow trainers felt that he was blackballed because he did not live in the Shelbyville area, where the Celebration is held. With his eventual success, he twice became the oldest rider ever to win the World Grand Championship, the first time at age 74.

Dunn was given the Trainer of the Year award by the Professional Walking Horse Trainers Organization for the first time in 1980. In 1987, he was inducted into the Tennessee Walking Horse Hall of Fame. In 1991 Dunn was named the Tennessee Walking Horse Professional Trainer of the Year by his fellow trainers for consistently showing and training top-quality horses. After his death, Dunn was inducted into the Lauderdale County Sports Hall of Fame in 2003.

Dunn had three children: Billie Ann by his first wife; David and Steven by his second wife Charlotte Blythe Dunn, and no children with his third wife Elaine (née Lewis). Steve Dunn also became a successful horse trainer, winning two World Grand Championships, the first before his father won one. Steve Dunn's winning horses were Motown Magic in 1989, and Out On Parole in 2002. Bud and Steve Dunn were at the time of Bud Dunn's death the only father and son to win World Grand Championships within the Tennessee Walking Horse industry. (Note: The duo of Donald Paschal and Sam Paschal, who also each won the competition were brothers, not father and son.) When Bud won his first World Grand Championship in 1992, three years after his son's first, Steve said, "I think him winning meant more to me than when I won it." Bud Dunn said of his partnership with Steve, "I always wanted him to work out here. But ain't many fathers and sons ever got along that long."

Bud Dunn died on January 11, 2001, at the age of 82, following two heart attacks brought about by complications from knee replacement surgery. He was buried in Oakwood Cemetery, in Sheffield, Alabama, United States.

== Notable horses ==
Dunn trained and rode his first World Grand Championship on the bay stallion Dark Spirit's Rebel. In 1991, the horse placed third in the competition. In 1992, the horse and rider pair won at most of the shows they had entered, including the World Grand Championship at that year's Celebration. Dunn had been training for 42 years at the time, and was 74 years old, making him the oldest trainer ever to win the class. The competition was held in front of a record crowd of 28,000. "Rebel" was the favorite horse going into the competition, out of a field of 13, and the team of Dunn and the stallion was described by the Florence TimesDaily as the "most popular team in Celebration history". Dunn said after the win, "I've been coming to the Celebration since 1950 and I've never seen anything like it. That made it twice as good. It's nice to know that I've got that many friends and supporters." The following year, Dark Spirit's Rebel was retired from competition in a formal ceremony at the Celebration. Dunn's riding number, 1865, was also retired.

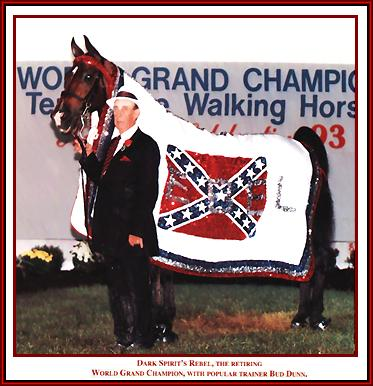
Bud Dunn with Dark Spirit's Rebel after winning his first Tennessee Walking Horse World Grand Championship in 1992 at age 74.

Dunn's second World Grand Champion was RPM, a son of Dark Spirit's Rebel. Dunn showed RPM to a Three-Year-Old World Championship in 1997. In 1998, RPM and Dunn won the Four-Year-Old World Championship and then placed second in the World Grand Championship; the latter achievement made them the Reserve World Grand Champions. Dunn had hopes of winning first the next year. In May 1999 the horse was sold to L R & N Partners, LLC for $1.25 million. The new owners moved RPM to trainer Sammy Day's stable in Shelbyville, with the intention of entering him in the Celebration. Shortly before the Celebration, Day was convicted of bribing a judge, fined, and put on a five-year suspension. Dunn was given the task of riding RPM in the show, and won the World Grand Championship. Dunn was 81, again making him the oldest rider ever to win the class, breaking his earlier record. At the same show, Steve Dunn rode Out On Parole to a Two-Year-Old World Championship, and another Dunn-trained horse, Broken Promises, won the Four-Year-Old World Championship.
