= Tennessee Walking Horse National Museum =

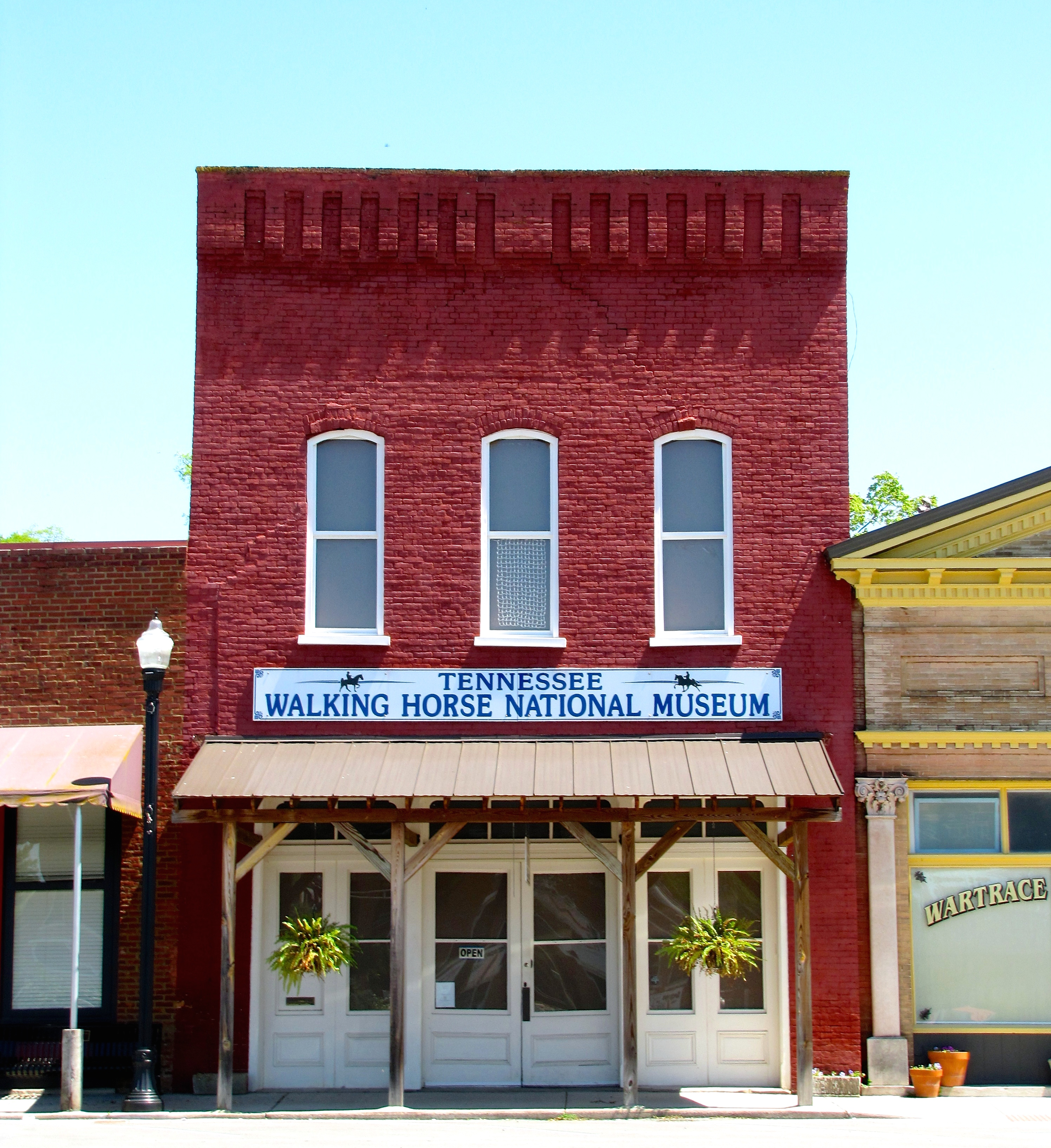
- Location: 27 Main Street; Wartrace, Tennessee
- Coordinates: 35.527438°N 86.332483°W
- President: Phillip Gentry
- Website: Official website

The Tennessee Walking Horse National Museum is the only museum dedicated entirely to the Tennessee Walking Horse. It is located in downtown Wartrace, Tennessee, and contains exhibits on all aspects of the Walking Horse industry.

== History ==
The Tennessee Walking Horse National Museum was first established in Shelbyville, Tennessee, at which time it was housed in a room adjacent to the Cooper Steel Arena. In the 1990s it was moved to Lynchburg, but subsequently closed in 2005. In 2011 it reopened inside an old store in Wartrace, which is known by the nickname "The cradle of the Tennessee Walking Horse".

In 2016, the museum was given over $3,000 in state grants. The money was used to restore old film of the Tennessee Walking Horse National Celebration and make it available for viewing.

== Exhibits ==
The Tennessee Walking Horse National Museum contains a variety of exhibits related to all aspects of the Tennessee Walking Horse industry. There is an exhibit on the current World Grand Champion, updated yearly as a new horse wins, and saddles and tack worn by past winners. There are also exhibits honoring select breeders and trainers, which are changed periodically. One prominent piece is the saddle worn by the first National Champion, Strolling Jim, as well as a color portrait of him painted in 1940 by artist Bill Humphreys. Another exhibit is focused on Betty Sain, who became the first female rider to win a World Grand Championship. Sain won the title in 1966, on her horse Shaker's Shocker. The museum also contains a hands-on section where visitors can look through old show bills, industry-related magazines, and the like.
