= Dark Spirit's Rebel =

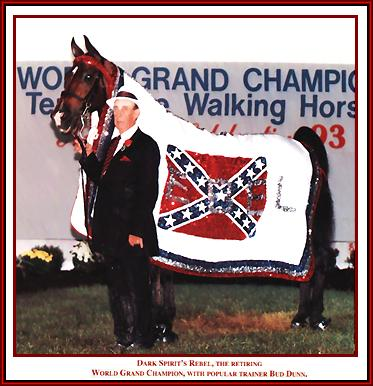
- Breed: Tennessee Walking Horse
- Discipline: Show horse
- Sex: Stallion
- Foaled: 1984
- Color: Bay
- Breeder: Harlinsdale Farm
- Owner: Frank and Shirley Neal
- Trainer: Bud Dunn

Major wins
- World Grand Championship in 1992

Dark Spirit's Rebel was a Tennessee Walking Horse who won a World Grand Championship in 1992. Nicknamed Rebel, the horse was trained by Alabama resident Bud Dunn. After his show career was over, Rebel sired the 1999 World Grand Champion Tennessee Walking Horse, RPM.

== Life ==
Dark Spirit's Rebel was a bay stallion foaled in 1984, sired by Pride's Dark Spirit and out of Bridle-Vale Penny. He was bred by Harlinsdale Farm of Franklin, Tennessee, the former home of the notable sire and show horse Midnight Sun. He was sold to Frank and Shirley Neal at Harlinsdale's 13th annual production sale.

== Career ==
Dark Spirit's Rebel was initially trained by Ramsey Bullington, who had previously won one World Grand Championship. In 1990 he was moved to Dunn and Son Stables in Florence, Alabama. The Neals initially planned to have Steve Dunn train and show Rebel, but he was concentrating on another horse and Rebel was paired with Steve's father, Bud Dunn. Dunn entered Rebel in the 1992 Tennessee Walking Horse National Celebration, where the pair won the preliminary class before entering the World Grand Championship. Dark Spirit's Rebel was the favorite in a class of 13 horses, and when he won the record crowd of 28,000 began screaming his name. The win was the first World Grand Championship for 74-year-old Dunn, who had been training horses for over 40 years. In an interview after the win, Frank Neal noted that, while he was proud of owning a World Grand Champion, "We are even prouder of the fact that our horse finally enabled Bud Dunn to accomplish this." The owners also commented that 13 was a lucky number for Dark Spirit's Rebel; he was the 13th horse purchased at Harlinsdale Farm's 13th production sale, had the 13th stall in Dunn's stable, and arrived in Shelbyville, Tennessee (location of the Celebration) 13 days before the World Grand Championship, among other examples. After his show career, Dark Spirit's Rebel sired a limited number of foals. Among them was RPM, who won the 1999 World Grand Championship, ridden by Bud Dunn.
