= Gen's Black Maverick =

Gen's Black Maverick Description

- Breed: Tennessee Walking Horse
- Sex: Stallion
- Color: Black
- Owner: Keith and Lorraine Rosbury
- Trainer: Bill Callaway

Major wins
- Reserve World Grand Championship in 2014; World Grand Championship in 2017

Gen's Black Maverick is a Tennessee Walking Horse stallion. He has won two World Championships and the 2017 World Grand Championship in the Tennessee Walking Horse National Celebration.

== Life and career ==
Gen's Black Maverick is a black stallion. He was sired by Gen's Black Gin and out of the mare Cash For Roses; both his parents are World Champions. Gen's Black Maverick is owned by Keith and Lorraine Rosbury of Bell Buckle, Tennessee and trained by Bill Callaway of Shelbyville. Gen's Black Maverick has competed in the Tennessee Walking Horse National Celebration multiple times; he and Callaway entered the World Grand Championship in both 2014 and 2015. Both years, I Am Jose was the winner, but in 2014 Gen's Black Maverick placed second, making him the Reserve World Grand Champion, and in 2015 he placed third. He and Callaway won the World Grand Championship in the 2017 Tennessee Walking Horse National Celebration. Gen's Black Maverick had previously won two World Championships. Later the same year, the Walking Horse Trainers Association named him Horse of the Year in the Stallions 15.2 and Over division.
