= Betty Sain =

US horse trainer and breeder (born 1942)

- Birth name: Elizabeth Fay Sain
- Occupation: Horse trainer
- Discipline: Performance Tennessee Walking Horse
- Born: November 20, 1942 (age 83); Manchester, Tennessee
- Major wins/Championships: World Grand Championship in 1966
- Lifetime achievements: Exhibit in Tennessee Walking Horse National Museum

Significant horses
- Shaker's Shocker

Elizabeth Fay Sain (born November 20, 1942) is a former Tennessee Walking Horse trainer and breeder from Tennessee. In 1966 she became the first woman to win the breed's World Grand Championship with the horse Shaker's Shocker.

== Life ==
Betty Sain was born Elizabeth Fay Sain on November 20, 1942, in Manchester, Tennessee. Her parents were Virginia Wright Sain and H. Pearl Sain, and she was their second child. As of 2010, Betty Sain had retired from the horse industry and was living in Lynchburg, Tennessee.

== Career ==
In 1962, the Sain family bought the weanling colt Shaker's Shocker from Tom Barham, of Lewisburg, Tennessee. Betty Sain trained the colt exclusively and started him under saddle herself. In 1964, she began showing him. In 1966, she entered Shaker's Shocker in the Tennessee Walking Horse National Celebration and won the four-year-old junior stake. She was expected to compete in the four-year-old division again but instead chose to enter the open stake, making her the first woman ever to enter the World Grand Championship class. Sain and Shaker's Shocker placed first out of 13 horses. Sain was the first woman to win, and at age 23 was the youngest rider in the class. After his win, Shaker's Shocker was retired to stud at Sain Stables in Bell Buckle, Tennessee. Sain later exported horses to Israel, Mexico and several other countries, as well as many US states. She rode Shaker's Shocker at University of Tennessee football games. She raised goats as well as horses, and supported a controversial Tennessee law that would have enacted a bounty on the killing of coyotes. When a reporter denied that there were coyotes in Tennessee, Sain froze a dead coyote to preserve it, tied a bow around its neck and presented it to him.

== Legacy and recognition ==
Although Sain was offered several book and movie deals, she turned them all down. In 2010, the Sain House at Webb School was given a Tennessee historical marker. In 2015, Betty Sain gave a presentation on her family's history, her own experiences with Shaker's Shocker and later horses, and an overview of the Tennessee Walking Horse breed at a meeting of the Bedford County Historical Society. The Tennessee Walking Horse National Museum in Wartrace has a permanent exhibit on Betty Sain and Shaker's Shocker.
