= The Talk of the Town (horse) =

Horse (foaled 1947)

- Breed: Tennessee Walking Horse
- Discipline: Show horse
- Sire: Midnight Sun
- Grandsire: Wilson's Allen
- Dam: Merry Rose
- Maternal grandsire: Merry Boy
- Sex: Gelding
- Foaled: 1947
- Country: United States
- Color: Bay
- Trainer: Steve Hill

Major wins
- Three World Grand Championships

The Talk of the Town (foaled 1947) was the first Tennessee Walking Horse to win three World Grand Championships, and one of only two horses ever to do so.

== Life ==
The Talk of the Town was foaled May 7, 1947, in Salisbury, Maryland. He was by the influential sire Midnight Sun and out of a mare named Merry Rose, the daughter of the well-known sire Merry Boy. His sire line traced directly back to Black Allan. He was a bay with no white markings. The Talk of the Town was sold at a dispersal sale as a weanling and went to Mississippi. From there he was sold again to an owner in Arkansas. While he was there, a Walking Horse trainer named Steve Hill came across the horse and bought a half interest in him. The Talk of the Town's other owner soon put him in full-time training at Hill's Tennessee stable. Hill described The Talk of the Town as an extremely tough horse to ride and handle for the first year and a half of his training. It was possibly because of this problem that the horse was gelded. Eventually, Hill was able to begin showing The Talk of the Town, with much success.

== Show career ==
The Talk of the Town won the three-year-old geldings class at the 1950 Tennessee Walking Horse National Celebration. A year later in 1951, he won his first World Grand Championship. He would win the class again in 1952 and 1953, making him the first of only two horses to win three World Grand Championships. The only other three-time winner, I Am Jose, won over 50 years later, in 2013, 2014, and 2015. The Talk of the Town made a final appearance at the Celebration in 1976, at age 29. That year, instead of starting the show each night with the traditional white horse and rider carrying the American flag, the show organizers invited notable trainers to bring their favorite horses. Steve Hill chose to ride The Talk of the Town, who was 29 years old at the time, and carry the flag.
