= Gen's Armed and Dangerous =

- Breed: Tennessee Walking Horse
- Discipline: Performance show horse
- Sire: Pride's Generator
- Dam: Melana Ebony
- Maternal grandsire: Ebony Masterpiece
- Sex: Stallion
- Color: Chestnut
- Breeder: B. G. Alford
- Trainer: Russ Thompson

Major wins
- Reserve Two-Year-Old World Championship in 1991; Three-Year-Old World Championship in 1992; Reserve Four-Year-Old World Championship in 1993; World Grand Championship in 1994

Honors
- Sire of the Year in 2004

Gen's Armed and Dangerous is a Tennessee Walking Horse stallion who won his breed's World Grand Championship in 1994.

== Life and show career ==
Gen's Armed and Dangerous is a chestnut stallion sired by Pride's Generator and out of the mare Melana Ebony, who was herself sired by the World Grand Champion Ebony Masterpiece. He was bred by B. G. Alford from Oxford, Mississippi, and his first owner was Claude Crowley. Shortly after the start of his show career, Gen's Armed and Dangerous was bought by Russ Thompson who in turn sold him to Susan Arthur Gordon of California. Gen's Armed and Dangerous was trained by Thompson, a Hartselle, Alabama native living in California, who started his career as a mechanic before trading a motorcycle for a Tennessee Walking Horse. The horse sparked an interest and Thompson soon became a professional trainer. Ridden by Thompson, Gen's Armed and Dangerous won the Reserve Two-Year-Old World Championship in the 1991 Tennessee Walking Horse National Celebration. He was the 1992 Three-Year-Old World Champion, and the Reserve Four-Year-Old World Champion in 1993. The next year, 1994, he was entered into the World Grand Championship and won first out of 18 horses. It was the first time a horse trained in California had ever won the World Grand Championship; most winners are trained in Tennessee or other Southern states.

== Breeding career ==
Gen's Armed and Dangerous was retired to stud in Tennessee after winning the World Grand Championship, and sold again to a group of Tennessee owners. In 2004 he was named Sire of the Year by the Tennessee Walking Horse Breeders' and Exhibitors' Association, a year after his son The Whole Nine Yards won the World Grand Championship.

At the 2005 Celebration, his offspring won 12 World Championships.
