= Setting Sun (horse) =

- Breed: Tennessee Walking Horse
- Discipline: Show horse
- Sire: Midnight Sun
- Grandsire: Wilson's Allen
- Dam: Alice Carver
- Sex: Stallion
- Foaled: 1952
- Color: Chestnut
- Breeder: W. H. Webb
- Owner: M. M. Bullard
- Trainer: Sam Paschal

Major wins
- Reserve World Grand Championship in 1957; World Grand Championship in 1958

Setting Sun (foaled 1952) was a Tennessee Walking Horse stallion who competed in his breed's World Grand Championship three times. On his first attempt, in 1956, he placed third; he won the Reserve World Grand Championship in 1957 and the World Grand Championship in 1958. He was trained by Sam Paschal. After his wins, Setting Sun made nationwide television appearances. He died in 1976 and is buried near Newport, Tennessee.

== Life ==
Setting Sun was a chestnut stallion sired by the notable breeding stallion Midnight Sun, and out of the mare Alice Carver. He was foaled in 1952 and bred by W. H. Webb of Carthage, Tennessee. He was owned by the industrialist M. M. Bullard of Newport, Tennessee, and trained by Sam Paschal of Murfreesboro, Tennessee. Paschal showed Setting Sun at the Tennessee Walking Horse National Celebration for the first time in 1956. They placed third in the World Grand Championship. The following year Setting Sun was the Reserve World Grand Champion, and in 1958 he finally won the World Grand Championship. After his World Grand Championship, Setting Sun made nationwide television appearances in the United States. He had 159 wins in 160 shows, and was estimated to be one of the most widely known Tennessee Walkers of the time. Setting Sun retired from showing in the mid-1960s. His last public appearance was at a horse show in Birmingham, Alabama. Following retirement from the show ring, he was used for breeding. He died of a kidney disease in September 1976 and was buried in a formal funeral on Bullard's farm. TV personality Stan Brock read the eulogy at the ceremony.
