= I Am Jose =

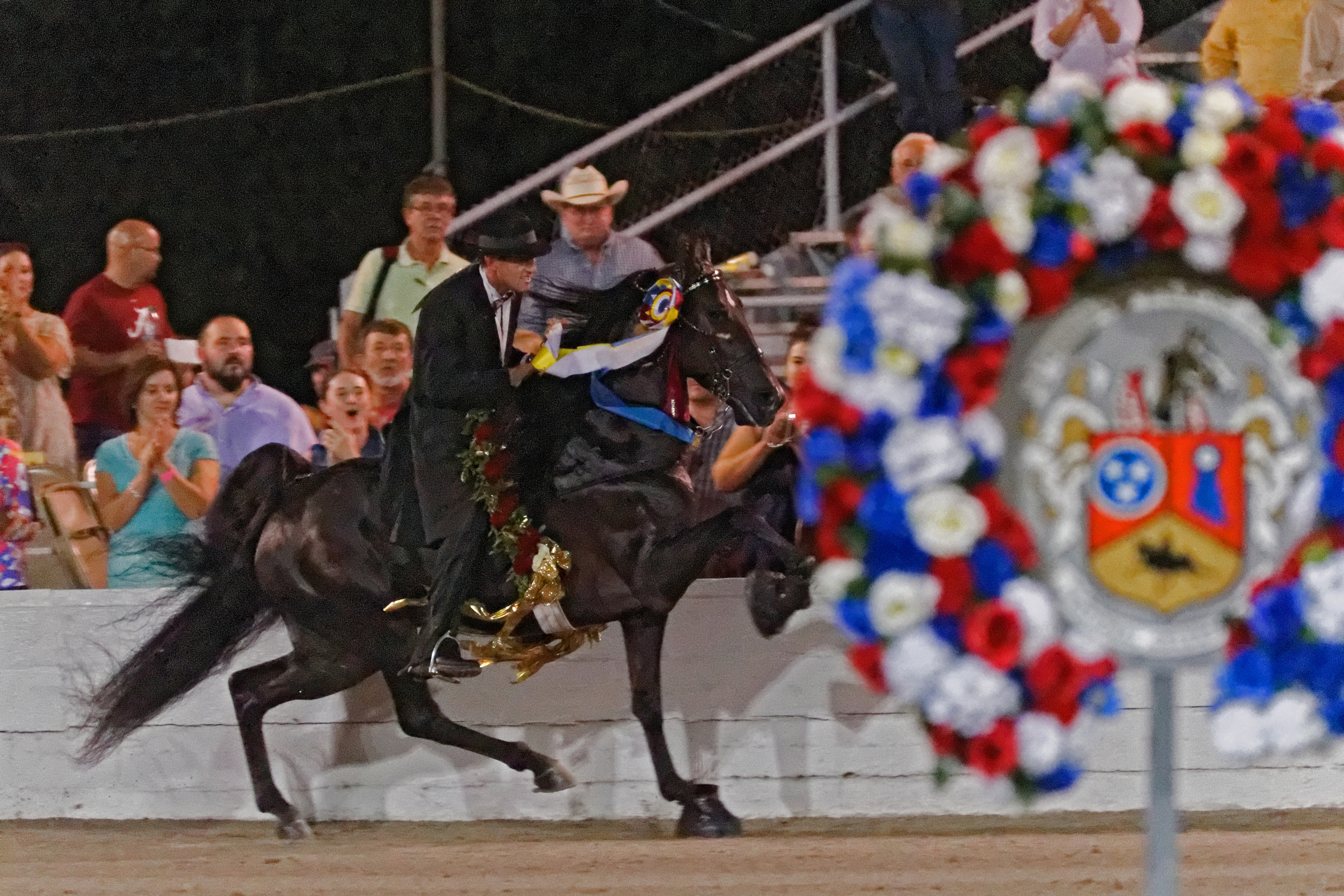
- I Am Jose winning the 2013 World Grand Championship
- Breed: Tennessee Walking Horse
- Discipline: Show horse
- Sire: Jose Jose
- Grandsire: Gen's Major General
- Dam: Prides Angelique
- Maternal grandsire: Pride's Generator
- Sex: Stallion
- Foaled: 2008
- Country: United States
- Color: Black, star
- Breeder: Robert W. Rollins
- Owner: Debbie & Billy Woods
- Trainer: Casey Wright

Awards
- Four-Year-Old World Championship in 2013; World Grand Championship in 2013; World Grand Championship in 2014; World Grand Championship in 2015

I Am Jose (foaled October 8, 2008) is a Tennessee Walking Horse stallion and three-time World Grand Champion. He is the first stallion and second horse to win the World Grand Championship three times. I Am Jose is black with a star on his forehead.

== Life and career ==
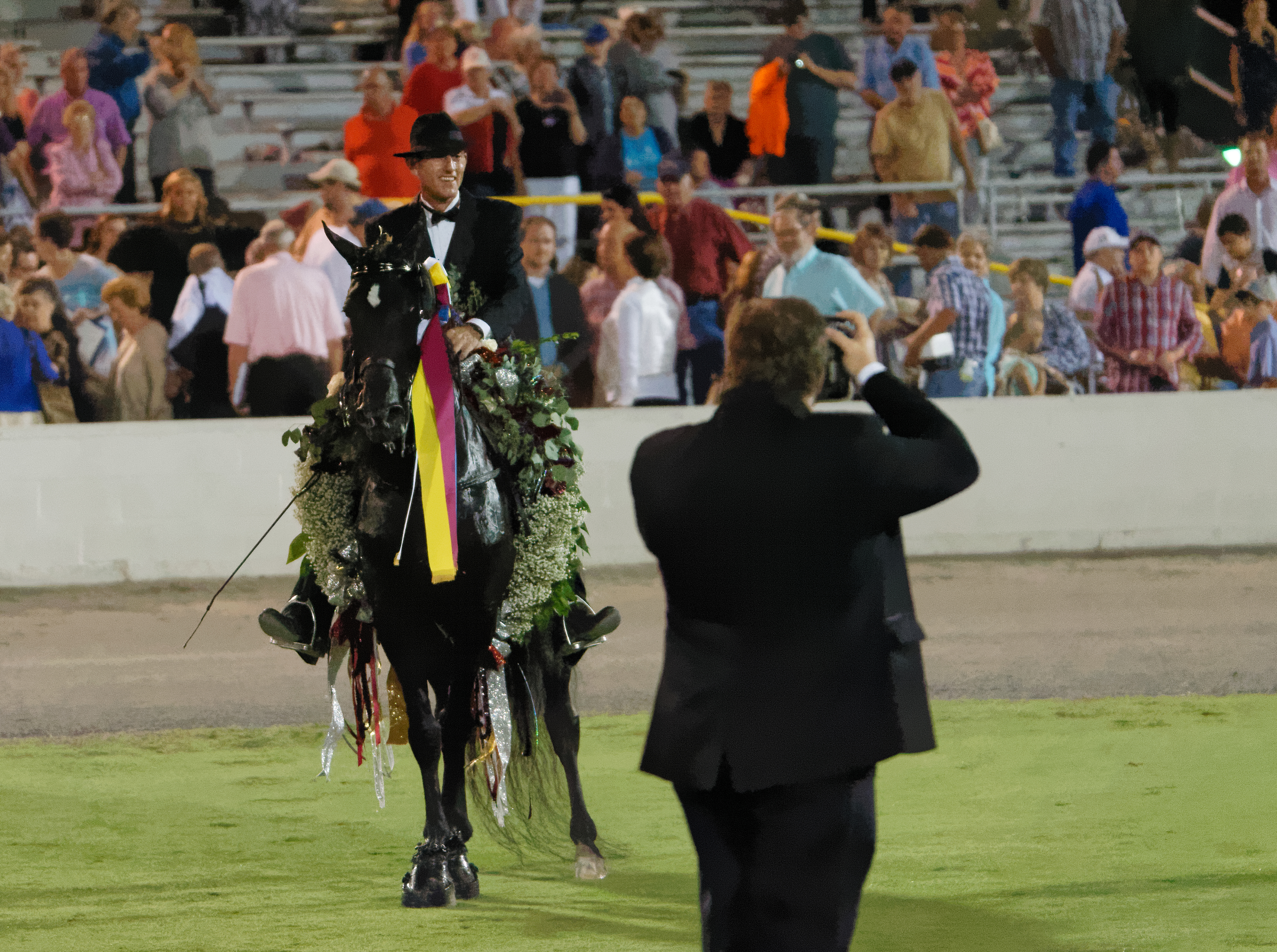
I Am Jose in the winner's circle, ridden by Casey Wright.

I Am Jose was foaled on October 8, 2008 near Franklin, North Carolina. He is a black stallion with a star on his forehead, sired by Jose Jose and out of Pride's Angelique. He was bred by Robert Rollins and sold to Billy and Debbie Woods of Lexington, Tennessee on February 14, 2011. The Woods put him in training with Casey Wright of Reagan, Tennessee. In 2013, Wright entered I Am Jose in the Tennessee Walking Horse National Celebration, where he won the four-year-old World Championship. Wright and the Woods made the decision to enter I Am Jose in the open World Grand Championship, which he won. I Am Jose won a second World Grand Championship in 2014, and a third just after midnight on September 6, 2015. I Am Jose is the first stallion to win three World Grand Championships and only the second horse ever to do so; the first was the gelding The Talk of the Town in 1951, 1952 and 1953. I Am Jose is the first repeat winner since Go Boy's Shadow in 1955 and 1956. His winning entry was his only show appearance in 2015, and his owners did not comment on whether it was the last of his career. Of note was that the Celebration has very strict inspection standards to prevent soring and I Am Jose passed. His trainer explained in 2014, "that's why we took him up there. We ain't got nothing to hide." Following the 2015 show season, the Walking Horse Trainers' Association named I Am Jose Horse of the Year in their stallions 15.2 hands (62 inches, 157 cm) and over division.

Between show seasons, he also stood at stud each fall after his championships and again between March and June, returning to show conditioning about a month prior to competition. It was this ability to switch focus from breeding to showing that was viewed as particularly impressive.

== Pedigree ==
Pedigree of I Am Jose
Sire Jose Jose	Gen's Major General	Pride's Generator	Pride of Midnight HF†
Sire Jose Jose	Gen's Major General	Pride's Generator	HF Spirit's Nell
Sire Jose Jose	Gen's Major General	Delights Lucky Charm	Sun's Delight D
Sire Jose Jose	Gen's Major General	Delights Lucky Charm	Merry Boy's Charm Lady
Sire Jose Jose	Stormy's Ruby	Pride's Stormy Night	Pride of Midnight HF†
Sire Jose Jose	Stormy's Ruby	Pride's Stormy Night	Merry Humoresque
Sire Jose Jose	Stormy's Ruby	76's Ruby	GF's Pride of 76
Sire Jose Jose	Stormy's Ruby	76's Ruby	Mack's Lovely Lady GF
Dam Prides Angelique	Pride's Generator	Pride of Midnight HF†	Midnight Sun
Dam Prides Angelique	Pride's Generator	Pride of Midnight HF†	Pride of Stanley
Dam Prides Angelique	Pride's Generator	HF Spirit's Nell	Spirit of Midnight
Dam Prides Angelique	Pride's Generator	HF Spirit's Nell	Nell's Last Lady
Dam Prides Angelique	Midnight Merry Meg	Midnight Merry Maker	Midnight Sun
Dam Prides Angelique	Midnight Merry Meg	Midnight Merry Maker	Merry Makers Sweet Sue
Dam Prides Angelique	Midnight Merry Meg	Go Boy's Satin Sue	Easter's Go Boy
Dam Prides Angelique	Midnight Merry Meg	Go Boy's Satin Sue	Maid of Money

† denotes inbreeding.
