= Shaker's Shocker =

Tennessee Walking Horse

- Breed: Tennessee Walking Horse
- Sire: Mack K's Handshaker
- Dam: My Darling
- Sex: Stallion
- Foaled: 1962
- Breeder: Tom Barham
- Owner: Betty Sain
- Trainer: Betty Sain

Major wins
- World Grand Championship in 1966

Awards
- Sports Illustrated Award of Merit

Shaker's Shocker was a Tennessee Walking Horse stallion who won his breed's World Grand Championship in 1966.

== Life ==
Shaker's Shocker was foaled in 1962, by World Grand Champion Mack K's Handshaker and out of My Darling. He was bred by Tom Barham of Lewisburg, Tennessee. He was a black stallion standing 17 hands (68 inches, 173 cm) high, and was originally registered as Handshaker's Nodder. He was sold to the Sain family in the fall of 1962 and his name was subsequently changed by Betty Sain. Shaker's Shocker sired 195 foals in his lifetime; after his retirement from showing, he was the lead sire at Sain Stables. He died October 13, 1981.

== Career ==
Betty Sain trained Shaker's Shocker entirely by herself; the first time she rode him, her father was in the hospital. Sain began showing Shaker's Shocker as a two-year-old in 1964, and he had a fairly successful season. In 1966, Betty Sain entered Shaker's Shocker in the Tennessee Walking Horse National Celebration. He won the four-year-old World Championship, referred to as the "junior stake" and was entered in the World Grand Championship, an open class for all ages of horses. Shaker's Shocker won, making Sain the first woman to win the class. Shaker's Shocker was the only Tennessee Walking Horse to have ever been given the Sports Illustrated Award of Merit. Shaker's Shocker retired from showing in 1970 and was put to stud at Sain's stables. He was also used as a mascot for University of Tennessee football games. Shaker's Shocker and Betty Sain have been given a historic marker in Tennessee. There is a permanent exhibit on them in the Tennessee Walking Horse National Museum.
