= Master of Jazz =

Competition Tennessee Walking Horse

- Breed: Tennessee Walking Horse
- Discipline: Show horse
- Sire: A Jazz Man
- Sex: Stallion
- Foaled: February 28, 2001
- Color: Black, blaze face
- Breeder: Gus King
- Owner: Lee Wall & Mike McGartland; Brian & Amanda Wright, Donnie & Mrs. Headrick
- Trainer: Jimmy McConnell

Major wins
- World Grand Championship in 2007

Master of Jazz is a Tennessee Walking Horse who won the World Grand Championship in 2007. Originally ridden in amateur horse show classes, he made the transition to professional competition in 2005 and won his breed's largest show, the Tennessee Walking Horse National Celebration, two years later.

== Life and career ==
Master of Jazz is a black stallion with a blaze on his face. He was sired by A Jazz Man, who was a son of Pride's Generator, and out of the mare Precious Pusher BW, a daughter of the World Grand Champion The Pusher. Master of Jazz was bred by Gus King of Arab, Alabama and foaled on February 28, 2001. He was later sold to Lee Wall and Mike McGartland. He was initially used by Wall as an amateur mount, but by 2005 the two decided he could win in open competition and placed him in training with Jimmy McConnell. Ridden by McConnell, Master of Jazz won stake classes in numerous shows throughout 2006 before entering the Tennessee Walking Horse National Celebration. He won one split of the Stallions 15.2 and Over class, the traditional first test of horses entering the World Grand Championship, but was unable to compete further as the World Grand Championship was cancelled that year. He and McConnell repeated their win of the stallion class in 2007 before going into the World Grand Championship, which they won. In early 2008, Master of Jazz's owners and trainer were honored at a luncheon held by then Tennessee Agriculture Commissioner Ken Givens. The luncheon is an annual event to recognize the impact of the horse industry in Tennessee and included notable horse trainers, breeders and others. In 2015 Master of Jazz was sold to Brian and Amanda Wright and Donnie and Mrs. Headrick. The new owners moved him to Fantasy Farms at Bell Buckle, Tennessee, where he continued his breeding career.
