= Haynes Peacock =

- Sire: Wilson's Allen
- Grandsire: Roan Allen
- Dam: Standardbred mare
- Sex: Gelding
- Country: United States
- Color: Chestnut
- Breeder: Jack Monette
- Owner: Colonel J. L. Haynes
- Trainer: Colonel J. L. Haynes

Major wins
- World Grand Championships, 1940 and 1941

Haynes Peacock was a Tennessee Walking Horse gelding. He won two World Grand Championships and was trained, owned and ridden by Colonel J. L. Haynes.

== Life and career ==
Haynes Peacock was by Wilson's Allen, an early Tennessee Walking Horse sire, and out of a Standardbred mare. He was a solid red chestnut gelding with no markings. He was bred by Jack Monette and used as a farm horse. During his early years, he was known as Old Dan. Monette rode the horse to the grocery store regularly and rode back home with both hands full of groceries. In 1939, Old Dan was exhibited at a small show in Tennessee and was seen by Colonel J. L. Haynes. Haynes soon bought the horse and at the age of twelve years, had him registered with the Tennessee Walking Horse Breeders' and Exhibitors' Association as Haynes Peacock. Haynes Peacock, ridden by Haynes, won World Grand Championships at the Tennessee Walking Horse National Celebration in the years 1940 and 1941, making him the first repeat champion. He died several years later and was buried on Haynes' farm, Haynes Haven, in the horse cemetery.
