= Ebony Masterpiece =

- Breed: Tennessee Walking Horse
- Discipline: Show horse
- Sire: Skipper's Son of Midnight
- Grandsire: Midnight Sun
- Dam: Lady Lee
- Maternal grandsire: Merry Boy
- Sex: Stallion
- Color: Black
- Breeder: Solitude Stock Farm
- Trainer: Bud Seaton; Sam Paschal

Major wins
- World Grand Championship in 1962

Ebony Masterpiece was a Tennessee Walking Horse stallion who won a World Grand Championship in 1962. After his show career he retired to stud, where he sired over 3,500 foals, six of which also became World Grand Champions.

== Life ==
Ebony Masterpiece was a black stallion sired by Skipper's Son of Midnight and out of Lady Lee. His grandsire was World Grand Champion Midnight Sun, and his damsire was Merry Boy. He was bred and raised on Solitude Stock Farm near Goodlettsville, Tennessee. Bud Seaton, the manager of the farm, began Ebony Masterpiece's training when he was a two-year-old in 1957. Seaton showed Ebony Masterpiece at the Tennessee Walking Horse National Celebration as a two-year-old and the horse won his age division's championship. However, he had a bowed tendon and had to be turned out to pasture to recover. In the spring of 1958 Ebony Masterpiece was sold to Clay Simpson of Bowling Green, Kentucky. In 1962, Simpson then sold him to Mr. and Mrs. Billy Hale, of Gallatin, Tennessee, for $17,000. Simpson had paid $2,500 when he bought Ebony Masterpiece. After the sale, Ebony Masterpiece was trained by Sam Paschal and shown in the fall of 1961. Ebony Masterpiece won the World Grand Championship in the 1962 Celebration, making him Paschal's second stake winner. Ebony Masterpiece lived to be 33 years old.

== Influence ==
Ebony Masterpiece was retired to stud following the 1962 Celebration, where he sired 3,555 foals. As of 2016, he remains the highest-producing stallion listed on the Tennessee Walking Horse Breeders' and Exhibitors' Association records. Five of his sons themselves became World Grand Champions in the Tennessee Walking Horse industry; Ebony's Senator in 1969, Another Masterpiece in 1974, Ebony's True Grit in 1975, Ebony's Mountain Man in 1980, and Ebony's Bold Courier in 1983. One of his sons, Bourbon Street Bum II, was registered as a Racking Horse and won the World Grand Championship in the 1984 Racking Horse World Celebration. Ebony Masterpiece was still siring foals in 1986, at the age of 30.

== Sire line tree ==
- Ebony Masterpiece
  - Ebony's Senator
  - Ebony Mountain Man
  - Ebony's True Grit
  - Another Masterpiece
  - Ebony's Bold Courier
  - Dr Elmer
    - Doc's High Tribute
  - Black Charger
    - Masquerading
