= Go Boy's Shadow =

- Breed: Tennessee Walking Horse
- Sire: Merry Go Boy
- Dam: Merry Walker
- Sex: Stallion
- Color: Black
- Breeder: Porter Rodgers
- Owner: Winston Wiser, E. H. Padgett
- Trainer: Winston Wiser

Major wins
- World Grand Championships in 1955 and 1956

Go Boy's Shadow was a Tennessee Walking Horse stallion who won two World Grand Championships in the years 1955 and 1956. He was the last horse to repeat win in his breed for nearly fifty years.

== Life and career ==
Go Boy's Shadow was a black stallion by Merry Go Boy and out of Merry Walker. He was foaled in Searcy, Arkansas, on the farm of Dr. Porter Rodgers. At the age of four months he was sold to Winston Wiser, and Wiser then allowed E. H. Padgett to buy a half interest in the colt. At three years old in 1955, Go Boy's Shadow won his first World Grand Championship at the Tennessee Walking Horse National Celebration. He repeated his win a year later, in 1956. Go Boy's Shadow was the last horse to repeat at the Celebration for nearly fifty years, until I Am Jose won the stake three years running, in 2013, 2014 and 2015.

== Sire line tree ==
- Go Boy's Shadow
  - Shadows Shadow
    - Sensational Shadow
