= The Whole Nine Yards (horse) =

- Breed: Tennessee Walking Horse
- Discipline: Performance show horse
- Sire: Gen's Armed and Dangerous
- Sex: Stallion
- Color: Chestnut
- Owner: Luanne Sigman
- Trainer: Bill Bobo

Major wins
- Four-Year-Old World Championship in 2002; Four-Year-Old Stallion World Championship in 2002; World Grand Championship in 2003

The Whole Nine Yards was a Tennessee Walking Horse stallion who won his breed's World Grand Championship in 2003. He was trained by Bill Bobo.

== Life and career ==
The Whole Nine Yards was sired by the 1994 World Grand Champion Gen's Armed and Dangerous. As a yearling, The Whole Nine Yards was purchased by Luanne Sigman, who originally intended to show him in amateur competition. She decided against it as the horse grew, and put him in training with Greg Lute. Lute showed The Whole Nine Yards at horse shows in Tennessee and Kentucky when he was three years old. The next year Lute retired from the horse industry and The Whole Nine Yards was moved to Bill Bobo's stable. Bobo showed The Whole Nine Yards in the 2002 Tennessee Walking Horse National Celebration and won both the open Four-Year-Old World Championship and the stallion-specific Four-Year-Old World Championship. The following year, 2003, they returned and won the World Grand Championship. Following his show career, The Whole Nine Yards was retired to stud, and was used in the breeding program of Tennessee artist and horse enthusiast Billie Nipper.
