= Pride's Jubilee Encore =

- Breed: Tennessee Walking Horse
- Discipline: Show horse
- Sire: Pride's Jubilee Star
- Dam: Lady Fame
- Sex: Stallion
- Foaled: April 29, 1991
- Color: Black
- Owner: Kay Dennis, Charles Terry, Jerold Pedigo
- Trainer: Bill Bobo; Allan Callaway

Major wins
- Four-Year-Old World Championship in 1995; World Grand Championship in 2001

Pride's Jubilee Encore is a Tennessee Walking Horse who won the World Grand Championship in the 2001 Tennessee Walking Horse National Celebration.

== Life and career ==
Pride's Jubilee Encore was foaled on April 29, 1991. He was sired by the World Grand Champion Pride's Jubilee Star and out of the mare Lady Fame. He is a black stallion with a blaze on his face and a sock on his left hind foot. He was sold to Kay Dennis as a three-year-old, and she put him in training with Bill Bobo of Shelbyville, Tennessee. Ridden by Bobo, Pride's Jubilee Encore won the Tennessee State Championship as a three-year-old. In 1995 Bobo entered him in the Tennessee Walking Horse National Celebration and won the Four-Year-Old World Championship. Pride's Jubilee Encore was moved to Allan Callaway's stable around 1998. In spring 2001 Kay Dennis sold part of her interest in the horse to Jerold Pedigo and Charles Terry and the three, working in conjunction with Callaway, began working toward the goal of winning the World Grand Championship. Pride's Jubilee Encore was one of 11 horses entered in the 2001 Celebration's final class, the World Grand Championship. Among the competitors was a mare named Shout, trained by Rodney Dick. When the horses were going into the final lineup to wait for the results to be announced, both Callaway and Dick tried to let the other go first and ended up going to the lineup at the same time. Pride's Jubilee Encore was the winner.
