= Harlinsdale Farm =

- U.S. National Register of Historic Places
- U.S. Historic district
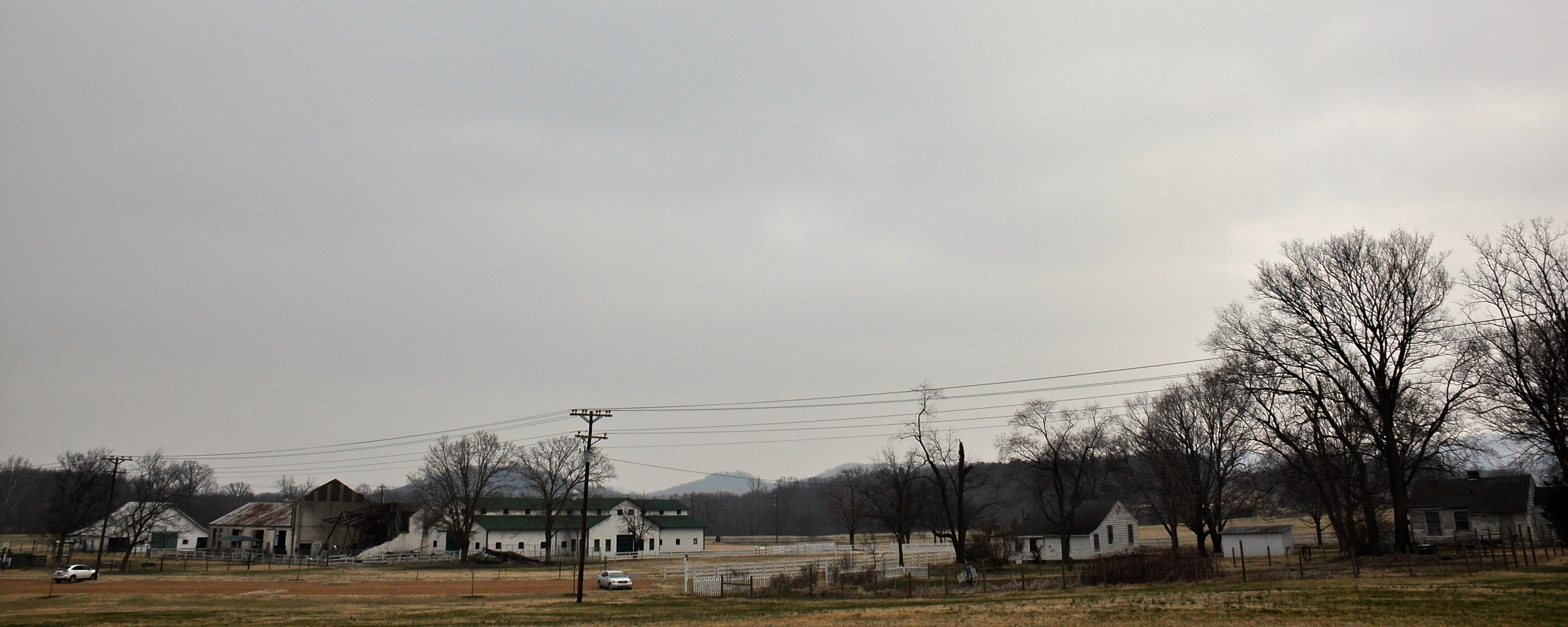
- Harlinsdale Farm, March 2014.

- Location within Tennessee Location within the United States
- Location: 239 Franklin Rd., Franklin, Tennessee
- Coordinates: 35.9334°N 86.8619°W
- Area: 198 acres (80 ha)
- Built: c.1900, 1935 and 1945
- Architectural style: Queen Anne and Colonial Revival
- MPS: Historic Family Farms in Middle Tennessee MPS
- NRHP reference No.: 06000344 (original); 100009500 (increase)

Significant dates
- Added to NRHP: May 3, 2006
- Boundary increase: October 23, 2023

Harlinsdale Farm is a 198-acre (80 ha) historic district in Franklin, Tennessee that was listed on the National Register of Historic Places in 2006. It dates from c.1900 and had other significant dates in 1935 and 1945.

Its main horse stable, the centerpiece of the property, was completed in 1935. Instead of traditional placement to the rear of the main house on the property, this stable is prominent in the property, set at the end of the drive in from the road, with its long axis parallel to the road. Several buildings on the property were modified in 1945.

It includes Colonial Revival styling for four laborers' houses on the property. When listed, the district included 14 contributing buildings, four contributing structures, and one contributing site, as well as four non-contributing buildings and one non-contributing site.

The NRHP eligibility of the property (and 342 other farm properties in Tennessee) was covered in a 1974 study of "Historic Family Farms in Middle Tennessee".

It was opened as a park of the City of Franklin, Tennessee in 2007. It was formerly used as a breeding farm for Tennessee Walking Horses.

== History ==
Harlinsdale Farm was founded in 1933 by W. W. Harlin. In the mid-1940s, the farm gained notability for being the home of Midnight Sun, a Tennessee Walking Horse stallion who won two World Grand Championships in 1945 and 1946. Harlinsdale remained the property of the Harlin family until 2004, when it was sold to the City of Franklin for $8 million. The farm is now open to the public as a park. Harlinsdale Farm continues to host horse shows.
