= Tennessee Walking Horse Breeders' and Exhibitors' Association =

(Horse) Breed association

- Location of the TWHBEA within the state of Tennessee
- Abbreviation: TWHBEA
- Predecessor: Tennessee Walking Horse Breeders' Association
- Formation: 1935
- Purpose: Registration of Tennessee Walking Horses
- Location: Lewisburg, Tennessee
- Services: Registration, membership
- Website: twhbea.com

The Tennessee Walking Horse Breeders' and Exhibitors' Association (abbreviated TWHBEA) is the oldest breed association for the Tennessee Walking Horse. It was founded in 1935 and is headquartered in Lewisburg, Tennessee. The association also runs the Tennessee Walking Horse Hall of Fame.

== History ==
The TWHBEA was founded in 1935 in Lewisburg, Tennessee for the purpose of registering Tennessee Walking Horses and maintaining their bloodlines. The first president was Burt Hunter. The association was originally named the Tennessee Walking Horse Breeders' Association of America, but was renamed in 1974 to cover the popular show industry.

The TWHBEA "closed the studbook" in 1947. This meant that after that date, new horses could only be registered if both their dam and stud stallion were each already registered. As of 2017, the TWHBEA has registered more than 520,000 horses, and has approximately 19,000 members.

== Registration ==
Only purebred Tennessee Walking Horses are eligible for TWHBEA registration. Beginning January 1, 2007, all foals must be DNA tested to verify their parentage before they are issued registration papers. An individual does not have to be a member of the TWHBEA to register a horse with the group. Although registration had been down since 2004, due to a slow economy and soring allegations, 2015 saw a 7.9% increase in foal registration.

== Competition and Hall of Fame ==
The TWHBEA has a variety of programs through which horses can earn points and awards, including distance, competitive trail riding, versatility, and specific programs for mares or geldings. Individuals may work to become certified as riding instructors through the TWHBEA. The TWHBEA publishes the Voice magazine six times per year.

=== Hall of Fame ===
The TWHBEA houses the Tennessee Walking Horse Hall of Fame, which honors notable trainers, breeders and others who made major contributions to the breed.

Inductees
Year inducted	Name	Notable for
?	Vic Thompson	Trained a World Grand Champion[
1987	Bud Dunn	Won over 20 World Championships and 2 World Grand Championships
1999	Charles Brantley	Bred many notable horses
