= Dickie Gardner =

American horse trainer

- Born: 1961/1962; Florida
- Major wins/Championships: World Championship in 2006; World Championship in 2010

Honors
- Trainer of the Year in 1999, 2004, 2009-2011, 2012-2014, 2015, 2016, 2021; Inducted into Spotted Saddle Horse Hall of Fame, 2010

Significant horses
- I'm Benny Too, Generatin' a Trail of Fire

Dickie Gardner is a horse trainer from Shelbyville, Tennessee. Gardner began his career training Tennessee Walking Horses, but switched to Spotted Saddle Horses, a related breed, in 1993. He has won several World Championships, been Trainer of the Year 11 times, and is in the Spotted Saddle Horse Hall of Fame.

== Personal life ==
Gardner was born in Florida in 1961/1962.

Gardner has a wife, Misti. The couple have twin daughters, Cheyenne and Dakoda, who were born in July 2007.

== Career ==
Gardner grew up with horses and became a professional trainer at the age of 18. He initially trained Tennessee Walking Horses and competed in the Tennessee Walking Horse National Celebration, while working for notable trainer Joe Fleming in Tennessee. In 1993 a friend introduced him to Spotted Saddle Horses, a related breed, and he switched to training them in his own stables, located outside Shelbyville, Tennessee. Gardner was named Trainer of the Year for the first time in 1999, and for the second time in 2004. In 2006 he and the horse I'm Benny Too won the World Championship in trail pleasure. Gardner served as the 2007 president of the Spotted Saddle Horse Trainers' Association. He was also on the board of the Spotted Saddle Horse Breeders' and Exhibitors' Association (SSHBEA). In November 2007, Gardner's stables were destroyed in a fire that killed over 30 horses. The fire began sometime in the early morning and a neighbor called 911 for the first time at 3 a.m. The Gardners, who lived off-site, were notified but by the time they arrived the barn was destroyed. The Shelbyville community supported Gardner and his wife as they rebuilt their stable and eventually resumed training horses.

Gardner shows with six different horse breed or sport associations and has been named Trainer of the Year a total of 11 times. In 2010, he was inducted into the Spotted Saddle Horse Breeders' and Exhibitors' Association Hall of Fame. The same year, he and the horse Generatin' a Trail of Fire won a World Championship. Three of Gardner's Trainer of the Year awards were from the National Spotted Saddle Horse Association (NSSHA) in the years 2012–2014, and three more from the SSHBEA in 2009–2011. In a 2014 interview, Gardner discussed the 2007 fire that destroyed his stables and said it had taken "hard work, a lot of time, and good health" to return to winning. That year he again had 30 horses in training.

In 2015 Gardner was Trainer of the Year in both the SSHBEA and NSSHA. He had an assistant trainer and barn manager, Crystal Deputy, who has also been Trainer of the Year. He was named Pleasure Horse trainer of the year in 2021.
