= Saddle seat =

Style of horse riding

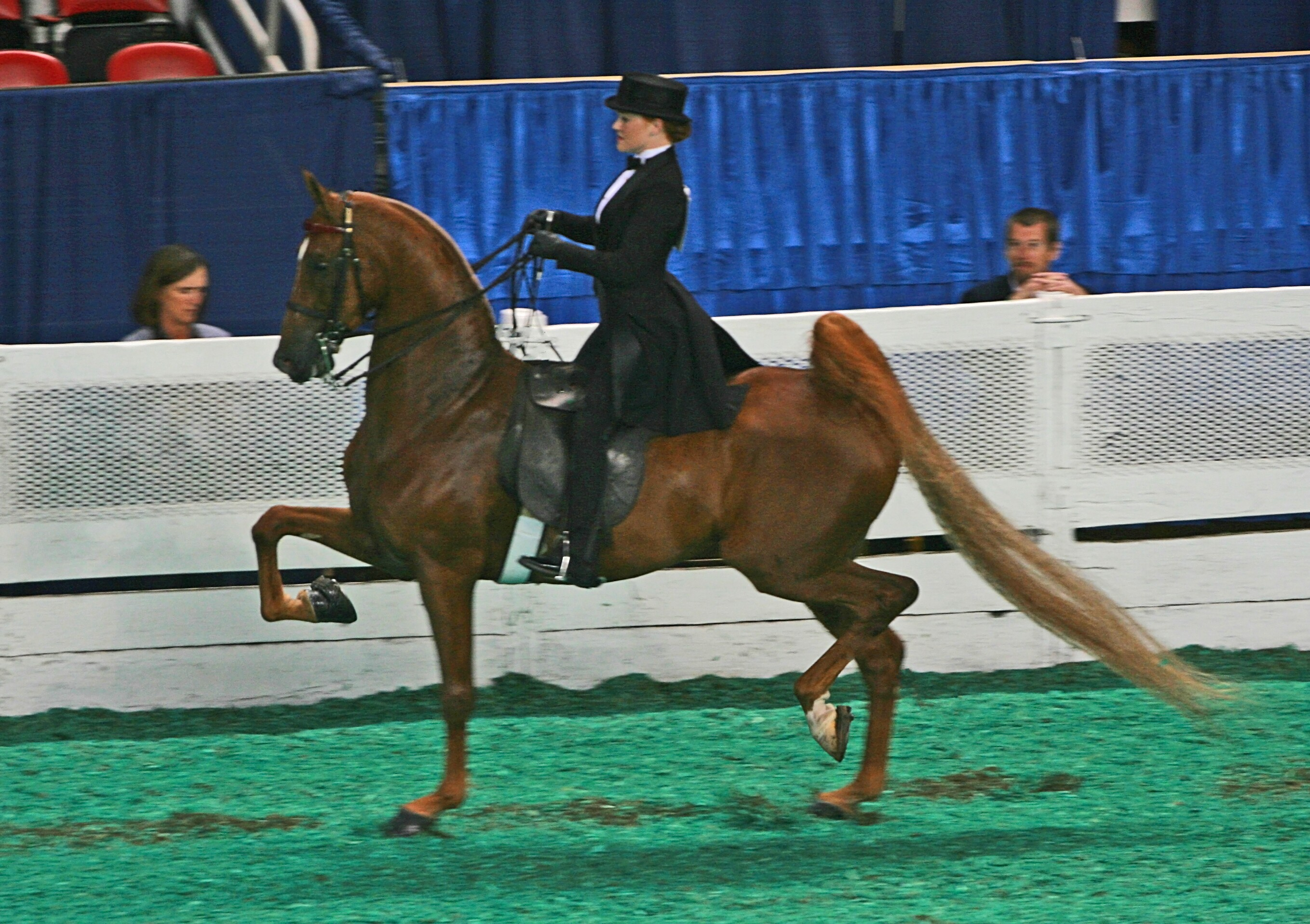
A saddle seat rider, in formal evening attire, showing a classic 3-gaited horse

Saddle seat (Note: As with other events governed by the United States Equestrian Federation, the discipline name is two words, "saddle seat" not one, "saddleseat".) is an English riding discipline designed to exhibit the high action of certain horse breeds, particularly the American Saddlebred. The style developed into its modern form in the United States and is also seen in Canada and South Africa. To a much lesser extent, it is ridden with American horse breeds in Europe and Australia.

The goal of the saddle seat riding style is to show off the horse's extravagant gaits, particularly the trot. It is not to be confused with the various hunt seat disciplines.

== History ==
Saddle seat riding began as a distinct style within the broader group of English riding disciplines developed in the United States. The first source was the Plantation tradition of the American South, where smooth-moving, high-stepping horses were used by plantation owners and overseers to travel across the fields. The horses had to be smooth riding and comfortable enough for hours of riding while overseeing the plantation, but the owners also preferred an impressive, high-stepping horse for riding in town. A second influence was European: a flatter English show saddle was developed from the tradition of riders who would often show off their flashiest, highest-stepping horses by riding them in city parks on Sundays. Hence, the term "park horse" is still used today to describe competitions in which the action of the horse is of paramount importance. In the northern United States, showing high-stepping horses in a flat park-style saddle at fairs was one way breeders would promote their horses.

== Equitation ==
Saddle seat is a style of English riding that differs considerably from other styles such as hunt seat and dressage. To the casual observer the rider sits well back in the saddle, carrying his or her hands higher than in other disciplines. Riders in equitation classes are penalized for leaning forward to any significant degree. However, like any other riding discipline, the position of the rider reflects the desired position of the horse. The rider must make the riding look effortless, and stay still and well-formed on the horse, sitting upright, with shoulders back and posting that is graceful and quiet. In saddle seat, high-stepping gaits are required of the horses shown, and the rider's position, behind the center of balance of the animal, allows the riding aids to be used to encourage front leg action in the horse.

== Type of horse required ==
Horse breeds usually shown saddle seat style typically have upright necks and free-moving, animated gaits. Several breeds do well in this discipline, with the most well-known being the American Saddlebred. Other breeds commonly exhibited in saddle seat style include Arabians, Morgans, Tennessee Walking Horses, and assorted partbred or crossbreds derived from these breeds, such as Spotted Saddle Horses, National Show Horses, and Racking Horse. In addition, Hackneys, Dutch Harness Horses, Paso Finos, Missouri Foxtrotters, and Rocky Mountain Horses are sometimes shown in this discipline.

The trot or gait for applicable breeds and divisions is generally considered to be the most prized gait. The 2020 United States Equestrian Federation (USEF) rule book defines movement for American Saddlebred and Half-American Saddlebred horses to be "clean, rhythmic and fluid action which is straight and true". Saddle seat horses should appear to be energetic and pleasant, while responsive to the exhibitor.

== Show classes ==
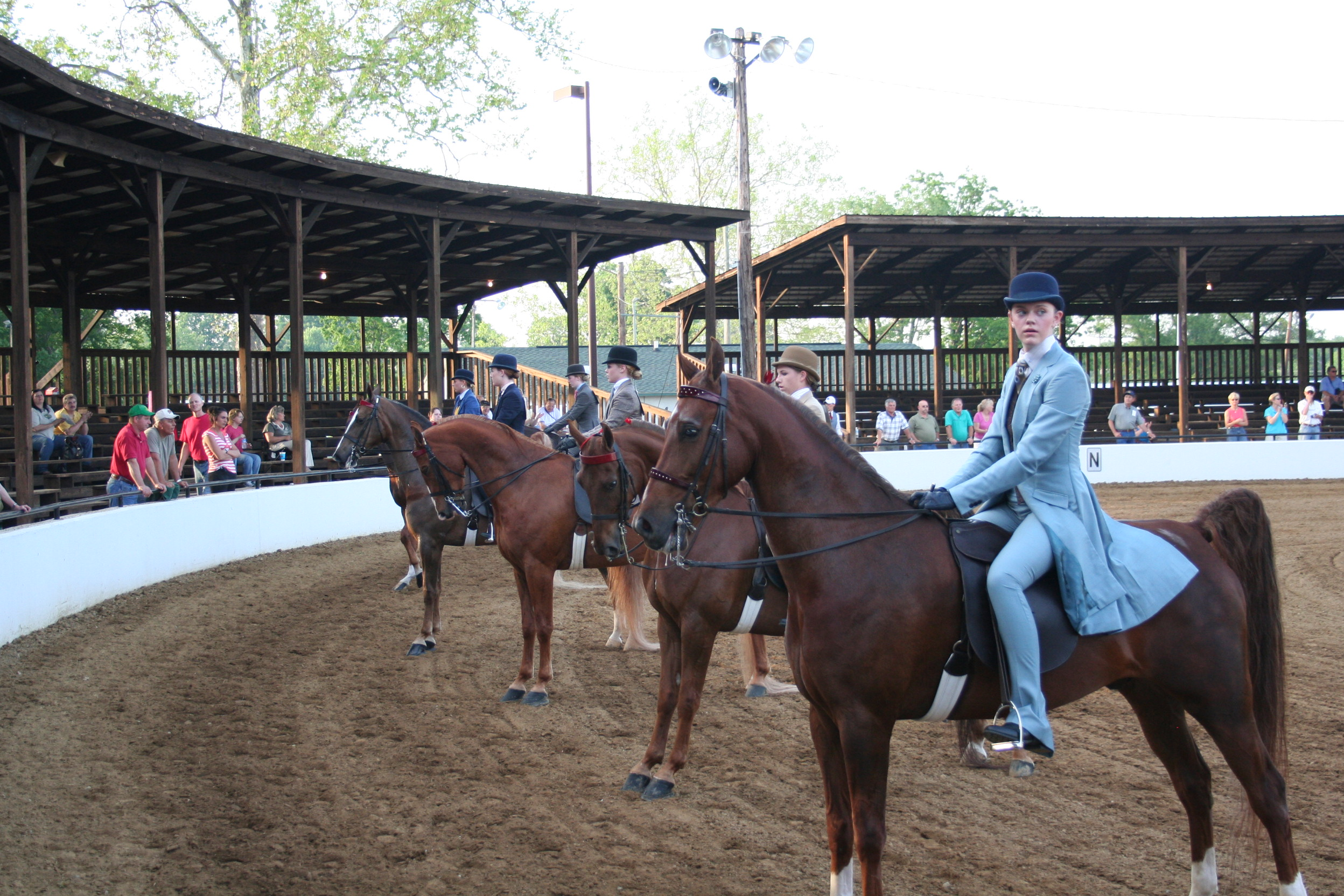
Lineup of a Saddle Seat class for American Saddlebreds, daytime "informal" attire

In the United States, the United States Equestrian Federation (USEF) creates and maintains the rules for most breeds shown in saddle seat competition.

Classes under saddle may include:

- Three-Gaited: Open to American Saddlebreds, shown at the walk, trot, and canter.
- Five-gaited: Open to American Saddlebreds, shown at the walk, trot, and canter, as well as the four -beat ambling gaits known as the rack (a fast, showy gait), and slow gait (four-beat gait with great suspension).
- Plantation Walker: Open to Tennessee Walking Horses, shown at the flat walk, running walk, and canter.
- Park: A class designation used in Saddlebred, Arabian, and Morgan competition, where horses are shown at a walk, trot, and canter, judged on their brilliant, high action.
- Pleasure: An English pleasure class designation used in almost every breed, designated classes where good manners and smooth performance are more important than brilliant action. Most pleasure classes require horses to show at a walk, trot and canter, often calling for extended gaits.
- Classic or Country Pleasure: This type of pleasure class that puts even greater emphasis on manners in the horse. The horse still has a high-set head position and somewhat animated gait, but animation is of less importance. Horses show at the walk, trot, and canter, often with extension, and are required to back.
- Equitation: judges the rider's form and use of aids.

Class terminology varies between breeds. For example, Saddlebreds may be shown in "English Show Pleasure" or "English Country Pleasure". Morgans have Park, English Pleasure, and "Classic" Pleasure classes. Arabians have Park, English Pleasure, and "Country" Pleasure classes. Tennessee Walkers exhibit in three categories: Flat shod, Plantation Pleasure, and Performance. Each class may ask for different variations of the gaits, extended gaits, and sometimes for any specialized gaits.

Any of the breeds used for saddle seat competition may also be shown in driving classes in harness, usually called "fine harness" or "pleasure driving", usually requiring a walk and two speeds of trot. Rules for horse grooming and handler attire parallel saddle seat rules.

In any competition, classes may be broken down by any of the following criteria:

- Age Divisions: may be divided by age of horse or rider. Horses may be divided into junior horses, usually age 4 and under, and senior horses, usually age 5 and over. Under the rules of the USEF, riders can be broken down into age groups as follows: 10 and under, 11–13, 14–17, 18–39 and 40 and over.
- Experience: divided by the experience of the horse or rider. The most common categories are: Maiden – never having won before in the division, Novice – never having won over three classes in the division, Limit – never having won over six classes in the division.

== Tack ==
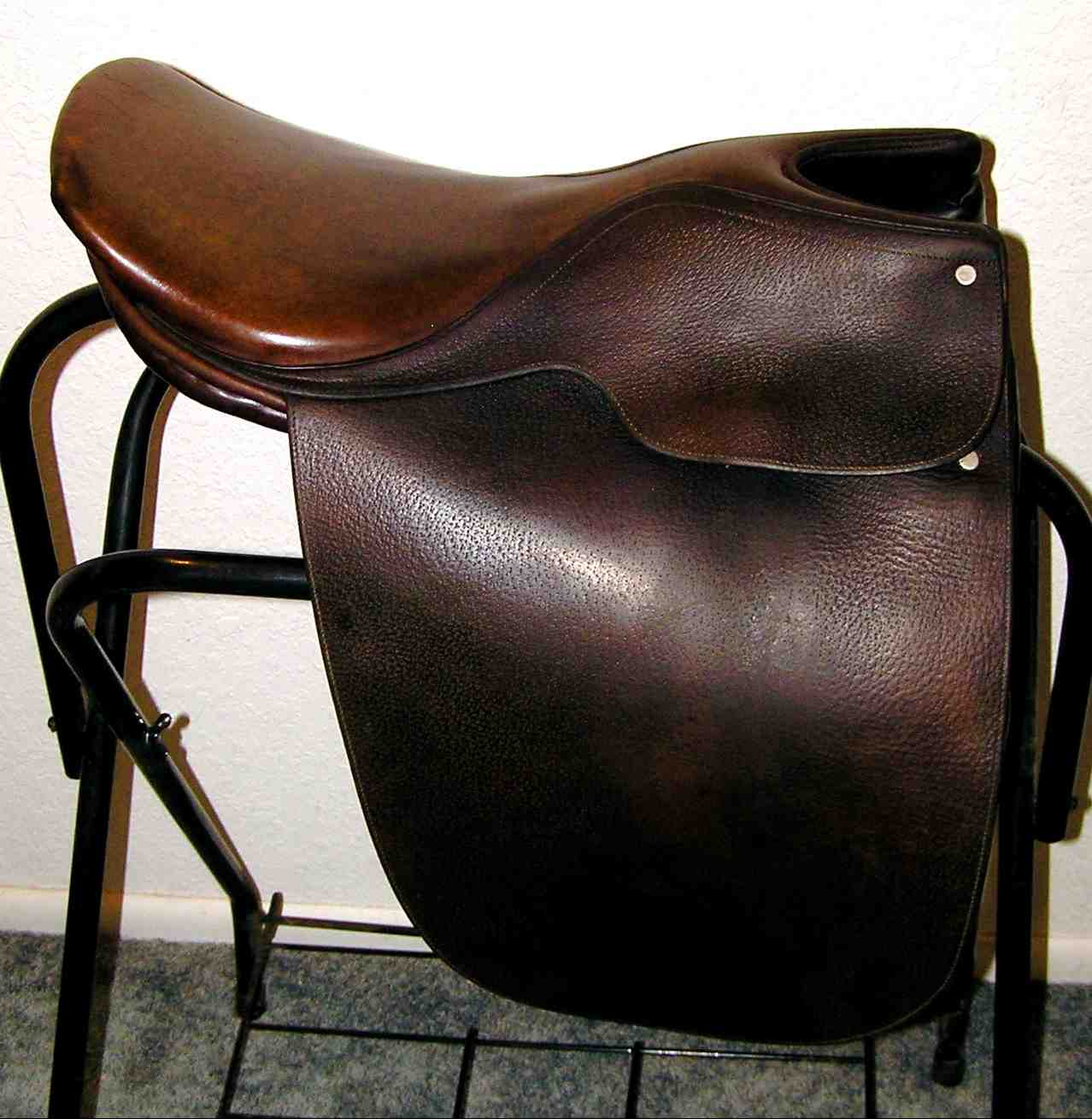
A "saddle seat" style saddle, also sometimes called a "Lane Fox" or "cutback"

Saddle seat riders use a special saddle not seen in other English riding disciplines. These saddles have a cut-back pommel, which is set back several inches (usually four) to allow for the higher withers and neck set of the horse. The saddle has little padding, a very flat seat, and is placed further back on the horse to allow the extravagant front end movement of the horse. This saddle also deliberately places the rider slightly "behind the motion", which makes it easier to influence both the headset of the horse and the animal's gaits.

Due to the cutback pommel, these saddles are usually a few inches longer than other English saddles. Even a properly balanced saddle seat saddle is quite flat and places the rider farther back on the horse in a position that feels less secure. However, good riders that ride a balanced saddle seat with long stirrups in a "classical" position (legs balanced under the rider, not sitting too far back on the horse's loins), are able to properly ride their horses, encouraging the animals to step under themselves and collect, raising their backs, elevating their necks, and working off their hindquarters. Poorly made saddles of this style can be unbalanced and an improper seat leads to a hollow-backed horse who does not have properly engaged hindquarters, with a superficially correct front-end position that is achieved by improperly forcing the horse's head and neck up and in, usually by means of leveraged training aids.

The saddle seat horse traditionally wears a double bridle (full bridle), with both a curb bit and a bradoon. A pelham bit is also legal for pleasure classes, though not common. The double bridle is preferred (and mandatory in most equitation classes) because it allows more fine-tuning of the horse's head and neck position, though a pelham can be used in a few specialized classes such as Saddlebred Pleasure Equitation. A single curb bit is used for gaited horses such as the Tennessee Walker and Missouri Fox Trotter. The shanks of the curb bit are often longer than those found on the Weymouth style double bridle used in dressage, often 7 inches in overall length (some breeds have length limits in the rules). The browband is commonly brightly colored leather or vinyl, red being the most common color. The cavesson is sometimes plain leather, and sometimes colored to match the browband, depending on breed and fashion trends in tack.

Junior classes, limited to horses under four or five years old, may allow horses to wear a snaffle bit. The use of martingales with snaffle bits in the show ring varies by breed, but setups for junior horses and other horses in training may include the use of a running martingale, a German martingale, or draw reins. These tools are commonly used in training.

== Shoeing and action ==
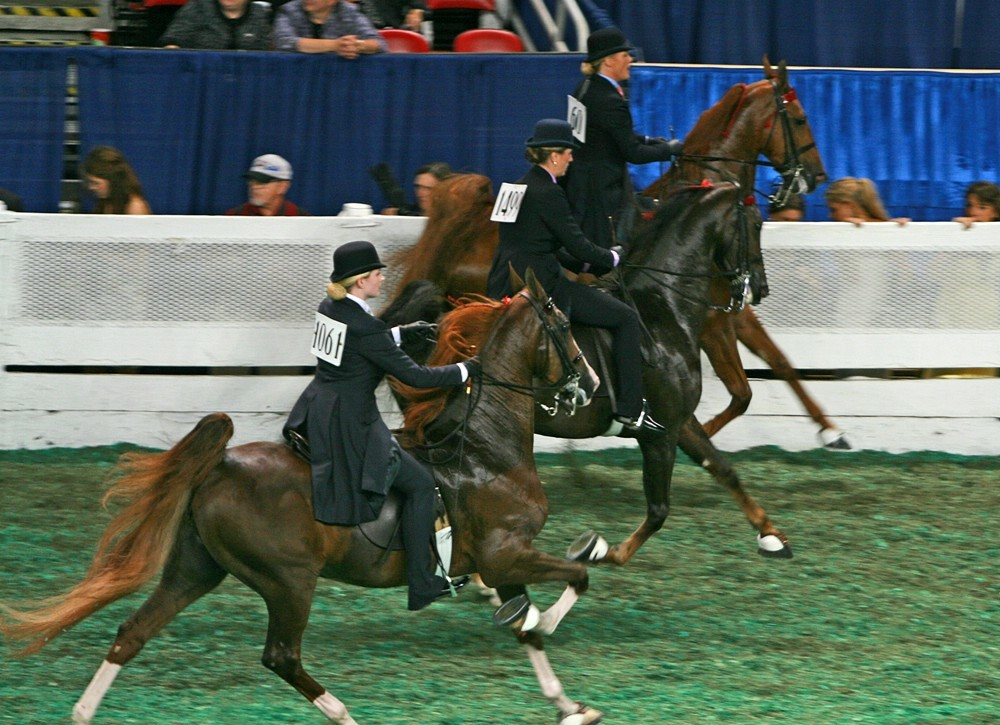
Saddlebreds in 5-gaited saddle seat performance competition

High action is prized in the saddle seat horse. Therefore, many horses used in saddle seat are allowed to grow longer feet than in other disciplines and are shod with pads and special shoes. While ordinary horseshoes are usually held on with horseshoe nails clinched on the outside wall of the hoof, shoes on high-action breeds are often held in place with a metal band, as well as with clinches, because of their weight. Longer toes and heavier shoes encourage a saddle seat horse to lift its feet and knees higher, or reach them out farther, with more "snap" and flash. Toe length and shoe weight therefore is an often controversial issue among saddle seat competitors. Toe length and, at times, shoe weight, are often measured at sanctioned shows. Pad height is also governed by breed: some breeds and divisions either prohibit pads altogether or only allow minimal pads. Other breeds, such as the American Saddlebred allow a 1-inch wedge pad, while at the extreme, 4-inch "stacks" are seen on certain Tennessee Walking Horses.

In Country Pleasure competition for Saddlebreds and flat shod divisions for Tennessee Walkers, built-up shoes and pads are not allowed, all action must be produced from natural ability. In saddle seat breed competition for Morgans and Arabians, pads and slightly weighted shoes are allowed, but with strictly enforced limits on overall toe length and shoe weight.

The exact combination of elevation (knee height) and extension (how far out in front the horse reaches with its feet) is determined to some extent by breed and fashion. However, for the health of the horse, specialized shoeing should not change the hoof angle to any significant degree, as more than a 3 degree alteration may lead to lameness.

== Big Lick ==
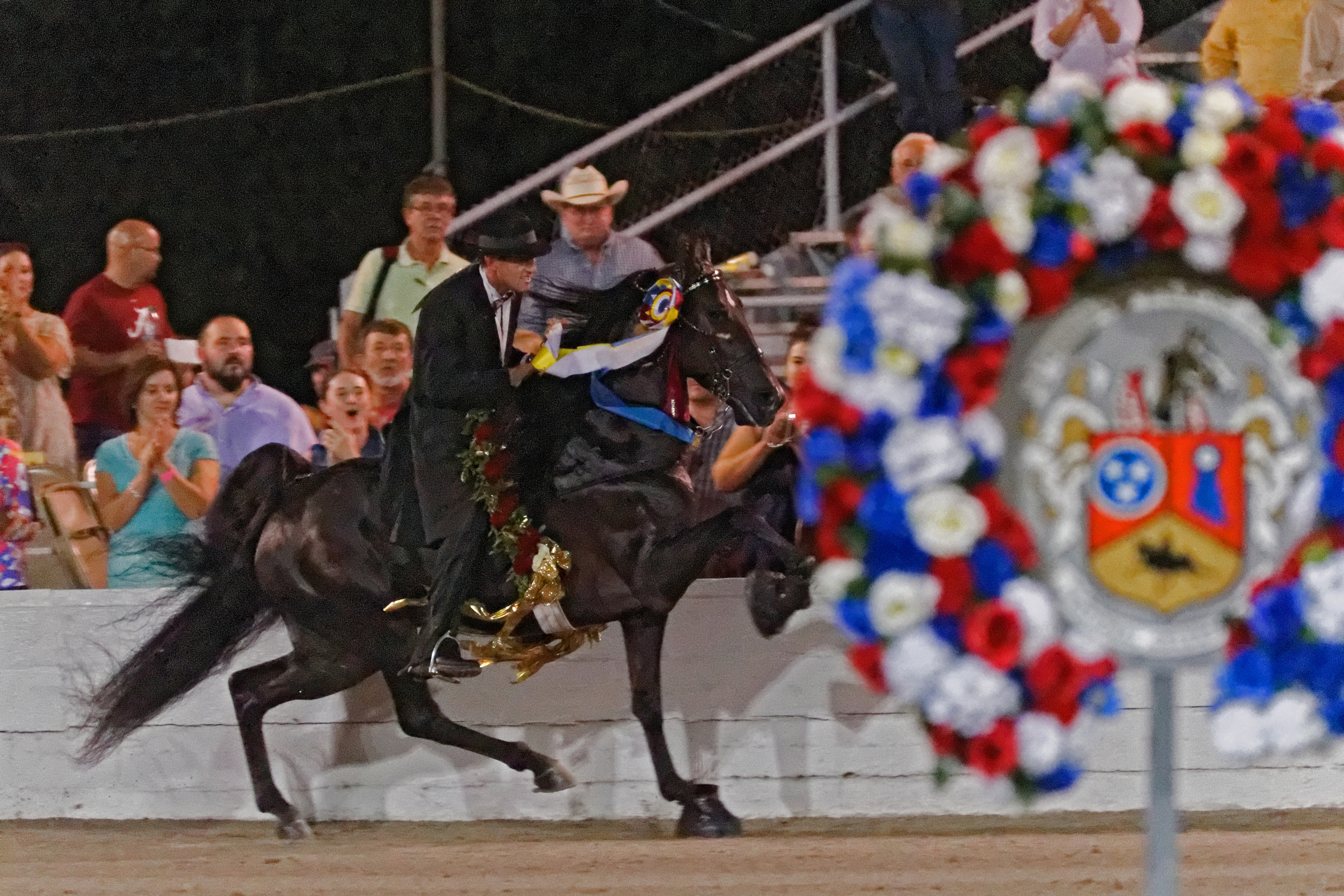
A big lick Tennessee Walking Horse

The Big Lick is widely considered an abusive training method, as it causes great pain and stress to the horse and will often damage its legs. The balance of the shoe can alter action: the Tennessee Walking Horse is asked to perform the "big lick", exaggerated action of the front legs, especially in the running walk, where the horse both lifts its feet very high and reaches them out in front as far as possible. The training method is often confused with saddle seat, but it has no relation to it. Big lick is used with some Tennessee walking horses but not in saddleseat.

Many saddle seat horses do wear certain devices to increase their action while in training. Use of these devices is very controversial, though when used correctly, they are said to help develop necessary muscles and should not be used in a manner that causes the horse physical pain. Devices used include stretchies (elastic rubber tubing attached to the front legs by fleece-covered leather half-hobbles, used to provide resistance training), weighted rattles (large beads) or chains placed around the fetlock, and "shackles" or a "running-W", devices composed of pulleys and ropes that help increase the horses' range of motion. The chains, when combined with soring, slide up and down as the horse moves, slide up and down, further irritating the areas already made painful by soring. Depending on the breed, some devices may be used in the warm-up area but not the show ring, while other breeds ban them from the show grounds entirely.

The most controversial practice used on the Tennessee Walking Horse, is soring: the placing of a caustic ointment on the coronary band and pastern of the horse, to cause pain so that the horse picks up its feet as quickly as they touch the ground. Contrary to popular belief, soring is not used in the saddle seat industry and has no relation to the sport. Because of the pain and stress it causes to animals, soring has been banned by federal law, enforced by the United States Department of Agriculture as part of the Horse Protection Act of 1970. However, enforcement is spotty amongst show-sanctioning organizations, and funds are not sufficient for the USDA to inspect all horse shows. Therefore, even though the practice is widely condemned and illegal, with possible criminal penalties possible, it is still a problem for the industry.

== Clothing ==
Correct saddle seat attire differs from that of western or hunt seat disciplines. For both men and women, it is closely modeled on men's business suits and/or the tuxedo, with variations in styling designed to improve the rider's appearance on horseback. Fashion in saddle seat disciplines changes with changes in menswear fashions, reflected in collar styles, shirt and tie designs, and sometimes in length of coat and color of linings.

According to the United States Equestrian Federation, conservative solid colors must be worn, such as black, navy blue, brown, dark green or gray. Pinstriped fabrics and other fabric textures that appear solid at a distance are also acceptable. However, in some classes, it is also legal to wear a "day coat", which is a coat that is of a contrasting color from the rider's trousers.

In all classes, riders wear Kentucky jodhpurs (sometime nicknamed "jods"), which are close-fitting pants with knee patches and bell-bottoms that go over the boots, usually with a strap that goes under the boot to keep them from riding up. A long, fitted coat is also required. For men, the coat length usually stops just above the knee. For women, depending on height, the coat may be below the knee, though exact length varies from year to year as show ring fashions change. The outfit is complete with the addition of jodhpur boots that come just over the ankle (similar to "paddock boots" sometimes worn in other disciplines), a hat (usually a derby for women and a fedora for men), a vest, tie, and dark gloves. In some breeds, riders have coat linings made in a contrasting color to add extra flash, though colored linings go in and out of style.

In equitation classes, in which the rider is judged, the coat and jods must match. In performance classes, in which the horse is judged, a matching equitation-style suit is appropriate, or riders, particularly women, may wear a day coat. Riders usually carry a longish whip, usually black, that is similar to that used by dressage riders. English-style spurs are optional. Technically a white-handled whip is only carried after 6:00 pm, but that particular tradition is widely ignored.

After 6:00 p.m., some classes allow a rider to wear formal attire, which is based on formal menswear fashion and usually consists of a black or dark navy blue long coat with matching satin lapels, top hat, vest or cummerbund, bow tie, white gloves and matching jodhpurs with matching satin strip on the outside of the pant leg. No formal attire can be worn in pleasure or pleasure equitation classes, (except for Morgan horse) competition, but it is commonly seen in evening equitation championships, and in "park" style riding and Driving classes for American Saddlebreds and Arabians. In a few breed disciplines, though never in equitation, wearing flashy, brocaded coats in a formal class in lieu of a matching suit is occasionally fashionable, usually depending on parallel styles in the world of men's fashions.

Under United States Equestrian Federation rules, a rider may opt to wear protective headgear in any class without penalty. In small, unrated, "academy" or "schooling" shows, classes for people new to saddle seat may relax the dress requirements and allow exhibitors to show without a costly show jacket, and simply wear Kentucky jodhpurs, boots, a long sleeve button down shirt, sometimes a vest, and an equestrian helmet instead of a derby.

== Show grooming of the saddle seat horse ==
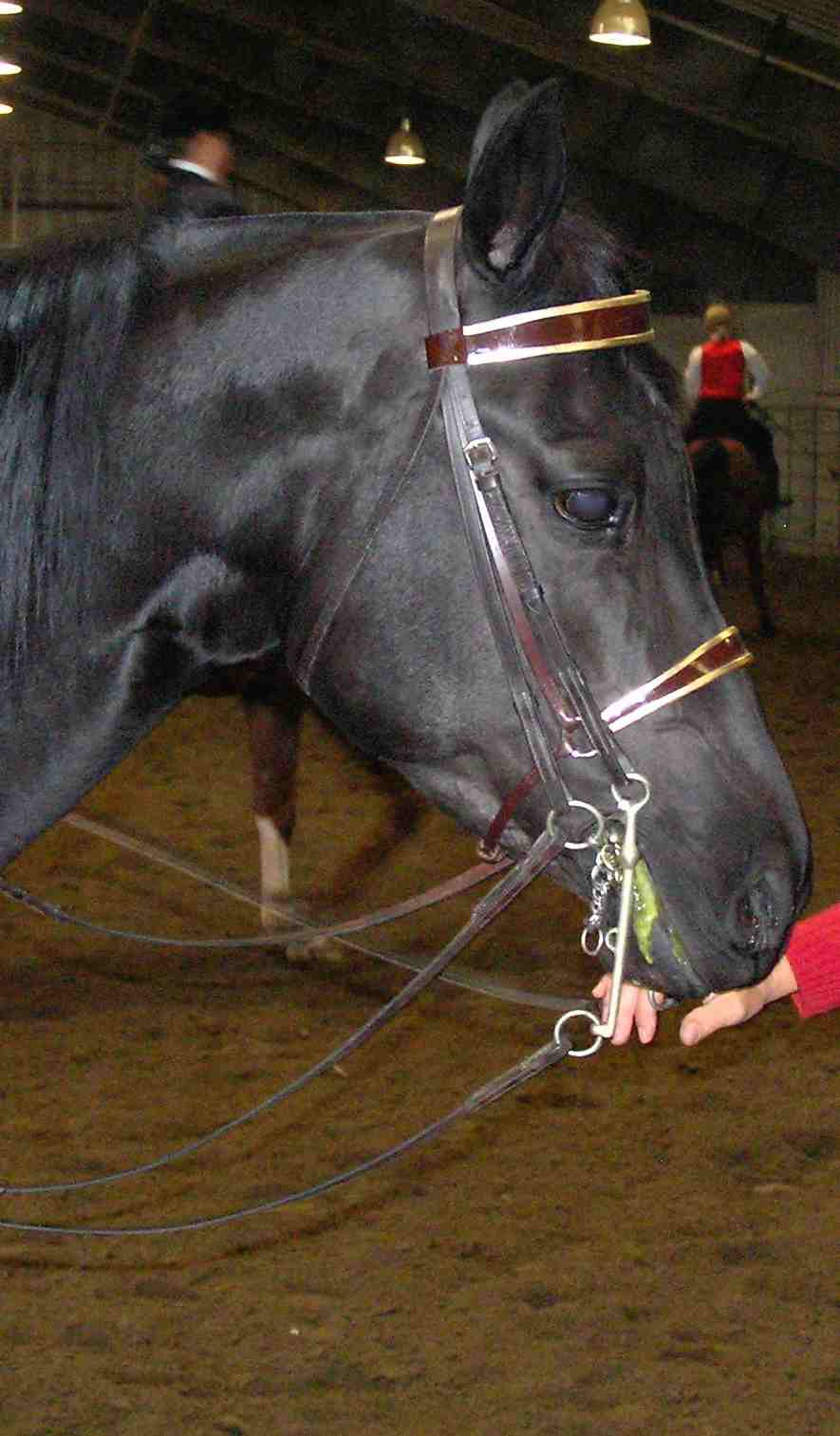
An Arabian horse turned out for a saddle seat pleasure class, wearing a double bridle with colorful browband and cavesson, moderately long bridle path, and long mane

Show ring grooming and "turnout" of the saddle seat horse is intended to emphasise elegance and grace. There are noticeable variations in grooming style between breeds, and sometimes within different disciplines of the same breed. Therefore, it is often quite easy even for newcomers to tell which breed is being shown by the observing the way the horses are groomed.

=== The mane and forelock ===
Horses shown saddle seat generally are left with a very long, flowing mane that is not trimmed or pulled. Tennessee Walking Horses, five-gaited American Saddlebreds, three-gaited pleasure, and park Saddlebreds, and other gaited breeds that adhere closely to their traditions, are usually shown with a full mane and forelock, though the forelock and the first lock of the mane may be braided with satin ribbon, which is color-coordinated with the browband of the bridle and the rider's outfit. (In recent years, the trend amongst Saddlebred exhibitors is to clip off the forelock.) On the other hand, Arabian and Morgan horses show with a full mane and tail with no additions; exhibitors are specifically prohibited from braiding or adding ribbons to their horses.

American Saddlebreds shown specifically in three-gaited competition are shown with a roached (entirely clipped off) mane and forelock, to accentuate the lines of the neck and head.

For all other breeds, only part of the mane is trimmed. This area, called the bridle path (the area of the mane just behind the horse's ears, where the bridle lies across the top of the horse's head), is often trimmed farther down the neck than in other disciplines in order to show off the clean throatlatch, length, and elegance of the horse's neck. While most show horses in the United States have a short bridle path (a bridle path less than six inches long or equal in length to the height of the horse's ear is a common rule of thumb), saddle seat horses often have a bridle path 8 to 12 inches long, depending on current fashion. There are variations in bridle path lengths: Arabian horse exhibitors are particularly prone to shaving extremely long bridle paths, while exhibitors of American Saddlebreds less so, and Morgan horse exhibitors typically fall in the middle.

=== The tail ===
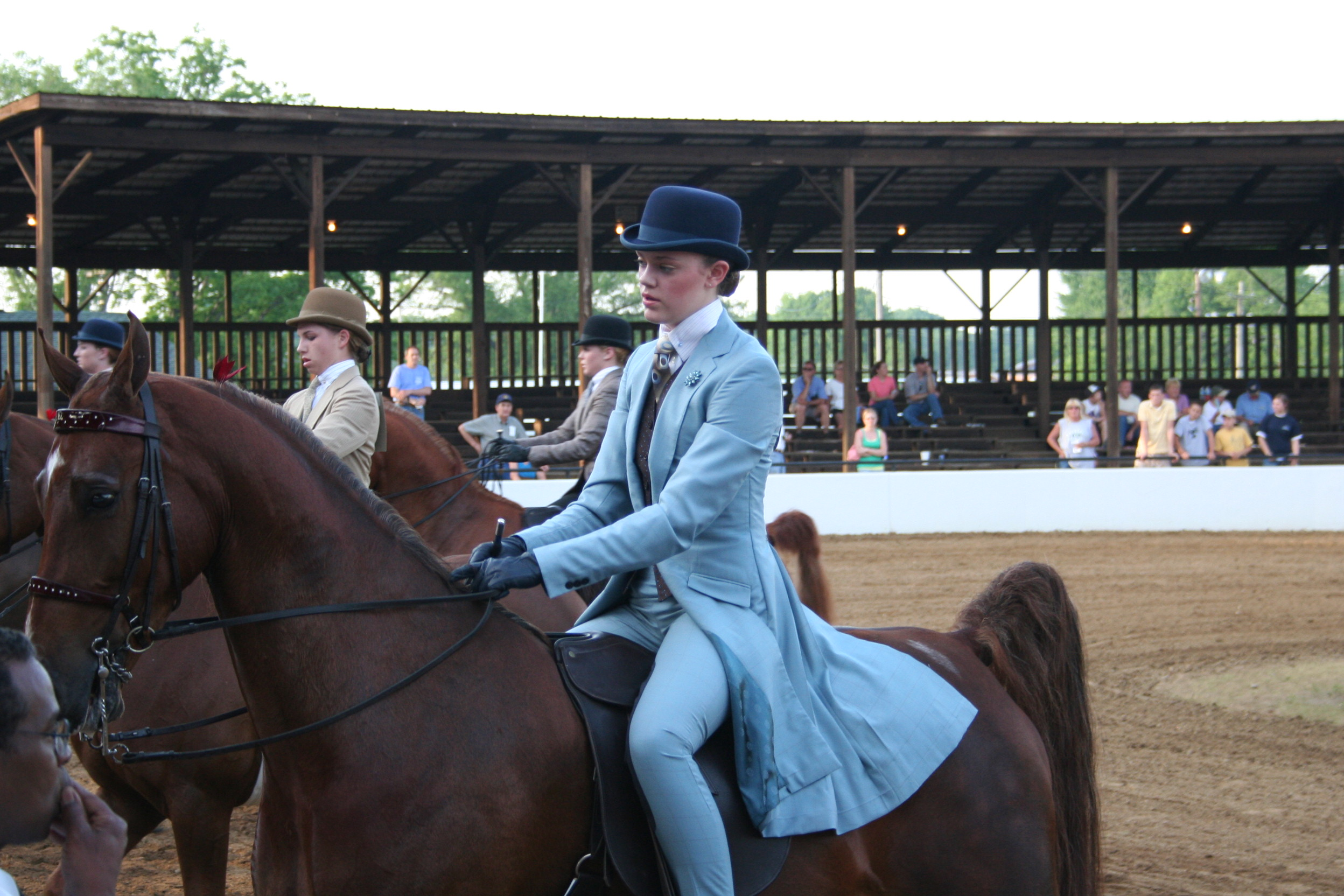
An American Saddlebred with an artificially set tail

The tail is left long, and often the bottom of it is kept wrapped up at the stable so that it grows long enough to skim or even drag on the ground as the horse moves, and only taken down for show. Formerly, the upper portion of a three-gaited horse's tail was shaved to balance the look of the roached mane and remains legal for show, but in recent decades the trend has been to keep a normal tail. Classes for three-gaited horses with full manes and tails are also offered.

=== Tail-setting ===
The American Saddlebred and Tennessee Walking Horse are shown with an artificially positioned tail in the "high action" classes, including park, three-gaited, five-gaited, and fine harness competition. Set tails are not allowed in Saddlebred or Tennessee Walking horse pleasure classes or in most flat shod classes, though a horse which has previously been shown with a set tail may be allowed in some classes if its tail has been taken down and allowed to return to its natural position. Other saddle seat breeds, such as the Arabian, Racking Horse and Morgan, prohibit tail-setting altogether. All American Saddlebred horses can compete with a natural, unset, and/or unbraced tail regardless of the division without penalty.

The upright set tail shortens the length of the rest of the tail by several inches. Therefore, horses with set tails, particularly if thin or slow-growing, may have a false tail added. False tails are not allowed in Morgan or Arabian competition. When used, false tails attempt to not appear obviously fake; they are matched to the horse's natural hair color and flow into the natural tail.

Tail setting is an incredibly controversial subject. This is primarily because a common way of creating the set look is a tail "nicking" operation, in which the retractor muscles on the underside of the dock are partially cut (the tail is not broken, as some people believe). The USEF permits, in American Saddlebred and Half American Saddlebred horses "surgical release of only the ventral sacrocaudal muscle is allowable if performed by a licensed veterinarian", but also states "The injecting of any foreign substance into a horse’s tail, the cutting of tail ligaments, soring or maiming of feet, or any such practice which would alter or influence a horse’s natural carriage, movement or behavior, is prohibited." Tail alterations raise significant welfare concerns and violate the rules of many governing bodies over equestrian sport, including the Fédération Équestre Internationale (FEI). These practices not only contravene ethical standards but also prevent horses from displaying pain or discomfort, potentially masking medical conditions The tail is then placed into a tail set so that when the muscles and ligaments heal they are longer where they were initially. A tail set is a harness-like device with straps that loop from the chest of the horse to the back of the tail to support a spoon crupper that actually holds the tail itself. A tail set holds the tail up and stretches the muscles and ligaments of the tail, preventing it from gradually sinking down. Once healed, the tail will still retain most of its movement and function, such as swatting flies, but can no longer be clamped down hard against the buttocks. In the show ring, the tailsetting harness is removed, but the tail is often tied or put into a tail brace to hold it in place.

It is possible to achieve the same look without the horse having to go through the nicking procedure. It is possibly to stretch the tail muscles by hand on a regular basis by pulling the tail up over the back. In conjunction with this, a tail set is also used that is tightened over time to raise the tail. This method is uncommon since it is more time consuming and yields a "tighter" tail that is physically more difficult to brace. If an upright tail position is desired, a humane brace can be used in the show ring to avoid physically altering the tail. This is a wire attachment that sits on top of the tail to give the appearance of a brace. False hair is used to cover the wire attachment. Humane braces are uncommon since they are difficult to stabilize on the tail, especially in riding horses.

Set tails require much effort on the part of the groom. If the tail set shifts off center, the tail can become permanently crooked or skin damage can occur. If the set tail is not taken care of appropriately, even a nicked tail will drop down to a more normal position in a few months. Because it could be dangerous to turn a horse out in a tail set, horses in active competition are generally stalled while wearing their tail sets. Many horses only wear their sets at shows and for a day or two prior, while others wear their sets for the entire competition season.

Between shows, in the off season, and of course after retirement, a horse does not wear its tail set and even a nicked tail will drop to some degree; many returning to a completely normal appearance and even regaining their ability to clamp down. If the horse is shown again at a later time, many horses with nicked tails need only wear the tail set for a few days before a show to re-stretch the tail muscles into the correct position.

=== The legs and head ===
The horse's legs are trimmed, and the chestnut cut close to the skin. The only exception to this tradition of closely trimmed legs is for breeds such as the Friesian where feathers on the fetlocks is a desired, breed specific, trait.

The head is also trimmed closely, paying special attention to the jaw, muzzle, ears (including the inside), and eyes. In the saddle seat world, the entire face often is clipped so the hairs are short, especially on a horse with a winter coat, and sometimes the entire horse is bodyclipped for an even finer appearance.

== Competition ==
The Saddle Seat World Cup is an international competition held biannually. It is the highest level of competition for saddle seat equitation riders and is competed in by the national saddle seat equitation teams from many countries around the world. The Saddle Seat Invitationals, held on the off years, are competed in by the Young Rider teams from various countries. Other national saddle seat equitation competitions include the NHS Good Hands Finals and the USEF (US Equestrian Federation) Finals held at the American Royal Horse Show in November. The NHS Good Hands Finals, UPHA Challenge Cup Finals, and USEF Medal Finals are considered the jewels in the Saddle Seat Equitation Triple Crown. This is frequently called the Saddlebred Equitation Triple Crown, which is incorrect as it is open to all breeds. However, usually only Morgan and Saddlebred riders are seen competing. Individual breed associations, such as the Morgan, Arabian, National Show Horse and others, also sponsor National Championship Saddle Seat Equitation competitions restricted to riders of horses of each particular breed.

== See also ==
- United States Equestrian Federation
- English Saddle
- Equitation
- English riding
- Equestrianism
