= Hunt seat =

Competitive equestrian sport

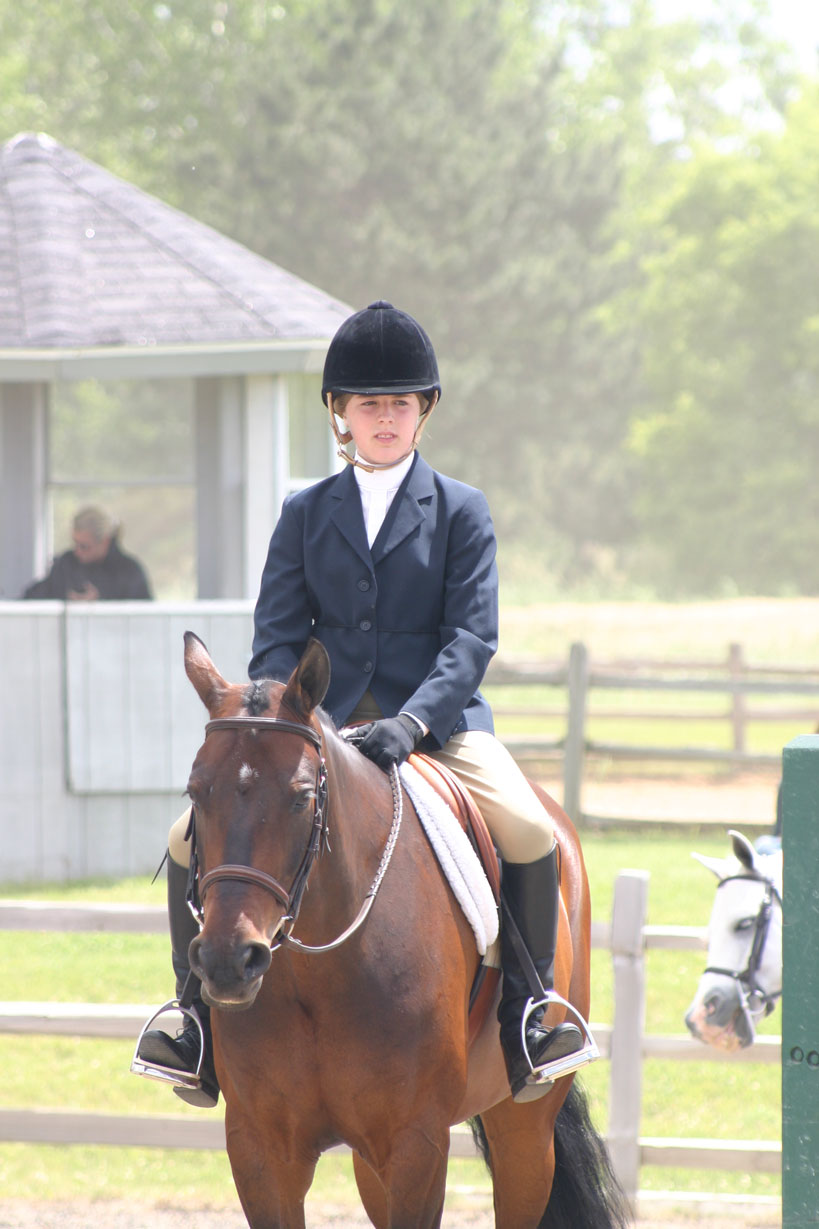
A horse and rider with hunt seat tack and attire

Hunt seat is a style of forward seat riding commonly found in North American horse shows. Along with dressage, it is one of the two classic forms of English riding. The hunt seat is based on the tradition of fox hunting. Hunt seat competition in North America includes both flat and over fences for show hunters, which judge the horse's movement and form, and equitation classes, which judge the rider's ability both on the flat and over fences. The term hunt seat may also refer to any form of forward seat riding, including the kind seen in show jumping and eventing.

Hunt seat is a popular form of riding in the United States, recognized by the USHJA (United States Hunter/Jumper Association) and the United States Equestrian Federation, and in Canada. While hunt seat showing per se is not an Olympic discipline, many show jumping competitors began by riding in hunter and equitation classes before moving into the jumper divisions.

== Rider position ==
One style of hunt seat saddle, an "eventing" saddle. It is heavier and has a deeper seat than the "close contact" style of hunt seat saddle.

The Hunt seat is also sometimes called the "forward seat" and it was first developed by Captain Federico Caprilli in the early 20th century. Ideally, a hunt seat rider has a very secure position. This includes proper leg position, weight in heels, soft hands, good posture, balanced seat, eyes up and, when working over fences, looking ahead towards the next fence.

Riders usually employ a "two-point" position while jumping fences, depending on the type of course and height of fences. The position is so named because the rider has "two points" (both legs) in contact with the saddle. The rider supports their body using leg and stirrup, keeping the heels down, closing the hip angle, and lifting the buttocks out of the saddle while keeping the head and shoulders up.

On the flat, or when used on course between jumps, the two-point position allows the horse to have a great deal of freedom of movement because the rider's weight is lifted off its back.

Position in two-point varies according to the task. Hunter riders generally have a very upright two-point, as they usually show on very level footing and at slower speed. Eventers may have a more crouched position, usually with the heel slightly more forward while riding cross-country, to provide more security as they ride over varying terrain at a fast gallop.

== Types of competition ==
Hunt seat competitions are generally divided into three horse show categories, hunters, equitation, and jumpers. Show hunters as a group are judged on manners, way of going, and conformation. Turnout, the presentation of horse and rider, are often taken into account as well. Jumpers are judged by how quickly a horse can complete a course of jumps with the fewest errors, called faults. Equitation riders are judged on the way they look and form of the rider, and the smoothness and overall appearance of the horse and rider as a team. Related disciplines within the broad category of "hunt seat" English riding include eventing and dressage, though the forward seat style of hunt seat equitation riders over fences contrasts with that of eventing riders in cross-country competition, or the deep, more upright position of dressage riders, a discipline that focuses on flat work does not incorporate jumping in competition. These activities are all differentiated from saddle seat-style English riding, which is an American-based discipline confined to the flat, developed for high-action show horses that are not intended to be shown over fences.

== The horse ==
=== Show hunter ===
Horses used in hunter over fences and hunter under saddle (or "flat", non-jumping) classes are called show hunters, and are judged on their movement, way of going, manners, and jumping form. Conformation is judged to some extent as well. Thus, smooth, quiet-moving, well-built horses with good temperament are desired. A related flat class seen in many breed-specific competitions similar to Hunter Under Saddle is English Pleasure-Hunter Type, simply called "English Pleasure" within some regions and breeds. Although a somewhat different style of horse than the classic hunter may be shown, the goals of good manners, performance, quality, and conformation are still emphasized.

Horses shown hunt seat may be of any breed, although those of Thoroughbred and Warmblood type are most common, except in pony classes. Regardless of breed, the horse should have a long stride with very little knee action, good jumping form with correct bascule, and should be well-mannered. For top level competition, movement and jumping form become increasingly more important.

=== Show jumper ===
The show jumper is generally a horse that has more power and energy than a show hunter. Because only jumping ability is scored, conformation, manners, and way of going are critical only as far as they affect soundness and ability to jump. Jumpers are often taller and more powerfully built than hunters, often with a bit more speed. Some are far more temperamental, though excellent jumpers must be manageable as well as athletic. Horses may be of any breed, though again, Thoroughbreds and Warmbloods dominate the field. It is rare for a horse to perform both as a hunter and as a jumper as temperament and style of movement are markedly different.

=== Equitation ===
Senior Equitation Over Fences at the 2014 Florida 4H State Horse Show

Hunt seat equitation classes judge the rider only, including his or her position on the flat and over fences and overall effectiveness while riding. Therefore, it is not imperative that the horse has perfect movement or jumping form, but it needs good manners and an attractive way of going that does not detract from the rider's performance. Although temperament is not judged, horses with a more tractable temperament are generally easier to ride, and can therefore help riders demonstrate their skills.

The ideal equitation mount has less bascule than the show hunter, because it is easier for a rider to maintain the correct jumping position on a "flatter" horse that does not throw the rider out of the saddle when it jumps. However, a show jumper is not ideal either, as the horse may be less smooth in its way of going and too excitable in temper for the rider to maintain steady and correct form over a course. The horse must jump safely and not carelessly rub rails. The movement of the equitation horse is generally more collected than the show hunter, which allows the rider to better adjust the stride for tricky combinations.

== Differences between show hunters, show jumpers, and equitation ==
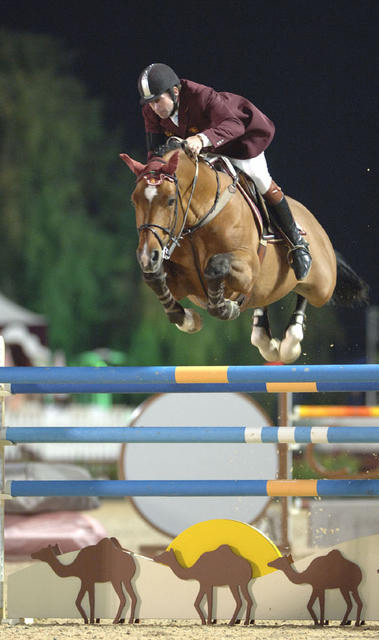
Jumper obstacles are generally very high and brightly colored.

=== Courses ===
The most notable difference between hunters and jumpers is the technicality of the courses. Show jumping courses include combination fences, sharp turns and several changes of direction, all requiring adjustability and athleticism. Show hunter courses include smoother lines, fewer combinations, and wider turns, reflecting the fox hunting tradition and the cadence needed for riding in large fields. Jumper fences can be quite high, up to 5 ft 3 in (1.60 m) in Grand Prix show jumping, and well in excess of 7 ft (2.13 m) in puissance (progressive high-jump) classes, with a much greater width. Show hunters, on the other hand, are shown over fences no greater than 4 ft 6 in (1.37 m) in height (as displaced in the relatively new "Performance Working Hunter" classes), even at the highest levels, but are expected to display a cadence and elegance that is not necessary in show jumping.

Equitation over fences courses test a rider's skill and form. They look like a hunter course, but contain more technical elements, such as intermediate difficulty combinations, tight turns, and difficult distances between fences, which are often seen in show jumping. These courses reach 3 ft 9 in (1.14 m) in height at the highest competitive level.

=== Obstacles ===
The fences used in show hunter courses are designed to be very natural in appearance, to simulate a natural cross-country hunting course. The poles and standards of the fences are usually natural wood or painted a conservative color, such as white or brown. Decorative elements might include brush or flowers. Water obstacles are not included.

Obstacles used in jumper competition are often brightly coloured and sometimes even deliberately designed to look "scary." These courses usually include an open water or "liverpool" obstacle, and may also have varied terrain with fences on the top or bottom of a bank, or with a ditch under an obstacle.

Equitation obstacles, though more complex in layout than a hunter course, are usually more conservative in design than jumper obstacles, more closely following those of the hunter courses.

=== Judging or scoring ===
Equitation and show hunters are judged subjectively based on ability and form (of the rider) and elegance, cadence and style (of the horse). Equitation may be judged in one round, though often a "work-off" is included in which the top riders return for further testing that might consist of another round of jumping, flatwork, no stirrup work, or switching horses, for example. Hunter courses are generally judged in one round, but classics often include two rounds for the top competitors. In most horse shows, four over-fence rounds (one often containing a 25% conformation component) and one flat class make up each hunter section. The judge decides which combination has the smoothest round and displayed a ride most closely to the ideal. Certain mistakes like refusals will lead to drastic penalties, while minor errors like a soft rub on a rail are slightly penalized, at the judge's discretion. This can make judging difficult to follow for those new to showing until the subtle factors considered by the judge are better understood.

Unlike the subjective scoring of the hunters, show jumping horses are more objectively penalized by accumulating "faults" if they knock down or refuse obstacles (four faults), or if they exceed the optimum time limit. Some jumper classes also require a second round for those who jumped clean (received no penalties) in the first round. These "jump-offs" are judged on accuracy and time. Competitors are placed first in the order of fewest faults and then in the order of fastest time (not just time allowed). Because style is never taken into account, the horse may jump in unorthodox form, take off from a poor spot, or rub a rail without any penalty. This objective scoring makes show jumping easy to follow though sometimes both horses and riders may exhibit unorthodox and even unsafe form without penalty.

=== Pacing ===
Speed is not favored in hunter or equitation classes. A steady but forward canter is seen in show hunter courses and in equitation courses. In show jumping, the rider may be penalized for going over the time. Therefore, a faster but steady gallop is used in jumper classes. Jump-offs also often display greater pace as time is of the essence.

== Classes ==
Classes of hunt seat riding are often divided by the horse and rider's ability, the rider's age, the height of the horse or pony, and the requirements of the horse in that class.

=== Type of class ===
- Flat or Hunter Under Saddle classes: The horse is judged "on the flat," meaning jumping is not involved. In show hunter classes, the horse's movement and manners are judged, with quality of movement paramount. In equitation classes, the rider's position, seat, and aids are judged. Horses are shown at the walk, trot, and canter. In some classes, backing up, an extended trot, and a hand gallop may also be required.
- Pleasure: Another class on the flat, where the horse's manners and suitability for the rider are ranked more highly than quality of conformation and movement. The horse should look like it is a pleasure to ride.
- Over-fences classes: The horse is judged over a course of fences. In show hunter classes, particular attention is paid to the horse's jumping form, the fluidity of the course, and its take-off spot for each fence on the course. The judge also looks for correct leads in the turns or clean flying changes, good movement, and a calm ride.
- Equitation classes In hunt seat equitation classes, the rider is judged on the flat and over a course of fences, with attention focused on their position between and while over a jump, their ability to get a horse to the right take-off spot, choice of line between fences, and their overall effectiveness. There are also equitation classes offered where riders are not asked to jump, particularly at lower-level shows.
- In-hand classes, also called "model" classes, these are non-riding classes where the horse is presented to the judge "in hand" meaning that it is led by a handler on the ground. The horse wears only a bridle. The animal's conformation is judged, as well as its movement and soundness.

=== Horse restricted divisions ===
- Pony Hunter: Pony hunter divisions are divided by the height of the pony. The divisions include small pony (12.2hh or smaller), medium pony (12.3hh to 13.2hh), and large pony (13.3hh to 14.2hh). The fence heights in pony classes are proportionate to the height of the pony. In regular competition, small ponies jump 2 ft 3 in (0.69 m), medium ponies jump 2 ft 6 in (0.76 m), and large ponies jump 3 ft (0.91 m)".

Pony hunter divisions may also be specified as Green Pony Hunter divisions. Green Pony Hunter divisions are for those ponies who are in their first year of rated showing. In Green Pony Hunter classes, small ponies jump 2 ft 3 in (0.69 m), medium ponies jump 2 ft 6 in (0.76 m), and large ponies jump 2 ft 9 in (0.84 m).

- Green Hunter: Green hunter divisions are for horses that are beginning their showing careers. At the local level and at C-rated horse shows, Baby Green and Pre-Green Hunter divisions are often held. The heights depend on local rules. However, most Baby Green Hunter fences are set at 2 ft 6 in (0.76 m) and most Pre-Green Hunter fences are set at 2 ft 9 in (0.84 m)/3 ft (0.91 m).

First and Second Year Green Hunters are shown under USEF rules. According to these rules, First Year Green Hunters are in their first year of showing fences at 3 ft 6 in (1.07 m). Therefore, fences in their classes are set at 3 ft 6 in (1.07 m). Second Year Green Hunters are in their second year of showing fences at 3 ft 6 in (1.07 m). Fences in their classes are set at 3 ft 9 in (1.14 m).

First and Second Year Green Hunters may also show in Green Conformation Hunter divisions. These divisions are the same as the previous divisions with one important difference. In conformation hunter classes, horses are judged 60% on their movement and performance and 40% on their conformation.

- Regular Hunter: Regular Hunter divisions are for the experienced horse and rider combination. The horse is much more likely to be shown by a professional rider or trainer. Fences are 4 ft (1.22 m) in height.

Regular Hunters may also show in Regular Conformation Hunter divisions. These divisions are the same as the previous division with one important difference. In conformation hunter classes, horses are judged 60% on their movement and performance and 40% on their conformation.

=== Rider restricted classes ===
- Short stirrup, long stirrup, and green/novice rider: These classes are for the riders with less experience and or horses who can not jump quite as high. Short stirrup classes are usually for riders 12 and under, long stirrup classes are for those 13 and over, although age varies between shows. Fence heights in these divisions are usually 2 ft (0.61 m). Green or novice rider divisions have courses set at 2 ft 3 in (0.69 m)–2 ft 6 in (0.76 m).
- Children, junior, and adult are classes broken down by age, but designed for riders with solid skills and a reasonable amount of show experience. Fences are usually 3 ft (0.91 m) in the children's and adult amateur classes. Modified junior and Amateur classes are a step up, at 3 ft 3 in (0.99 m). The highest levels for both age groups are the junior and amateur owner divisions, with fence heights of 3 ft 6 in (1.07 m). These classes may be further divided by height of horse into Large (16 hh+) and Small (under 16 hh), or by age of the rider. USEF age divisions are usually 13 and under, 14–17 yrs, and 18 and over. Some organizations break down the adult division even further. Variations include 18–39 years, or 18–35, 36–49 and a "silver" division for riders 50 and over)
- Walk/trot' is a flat class for beginner riders, requiring the rider only to execute the walk and trot. These classes are not always offered at the higher-rated shows.
- Beginner rider: A non-USEF type of class offered in some areas, open to riders who have just begun showing. The rider may become ineligible for this class after one or two years of showing, or after winning a certain number of classes. These classes are not offered at the higher-rated shows.
- Maiden, Novice and Limit: Classes limited to horses or riders who have not won one, three or six first place (blue) ribbons in a given division at any show or shows sanctioned by a given organization, such as the USEF.
- Adult Amateur and Professional: these class divisions are designed to separate non-professional riders, called amateurs (because they do not earn a living from equestrian activities) from professional riders and trainers.

== Required tack ==
=== Hunter and equitation classes ===
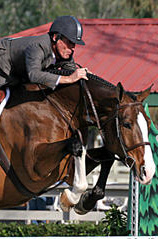
Correct tack for hunter classes

Hunter classes (both under-saddle and over fences) have requirements for classic, plain tack that demonstrates that the hunter is easy to ride and attentive and responsive to its rider.

The saddle is usually a type of forward seat (jumping saddle), generally the style called "close contact," though "eventing" and "all-purpose" designs are seen in some areas, particularly at lower levels. Saddles are usually of brown leather, with a plain girth, usually of leather. The saddle pad should be white, and shaped to fit the saddle. Ideally, no more than one inch of pad should appear under the saddle.

The bridle is simple, with a plain cavesson (any type of noseband other than a plain cavesson is prohibited) and a simple, unadorned browband. Bits are also simple, with riders usually using a classic snaffle bit, either a dee-ring, eggbutt, or full cheek design. Milder bits are preferred in hunter classes. Pelham bits which include a curb chain and require two sets of reins are also legal and are particularly popular in equitation. Bit converters are illegal.

Almost all shows prohibit martingales in "flat" or "under saddle" (not to jump) classes. Martingales are only permitted in over-fence classes, and only the standing martingale is legal in hunter classes. A running martingale is legal for jumpers, but it is not for hunters. According to the 2007 USEF Rule Book for the Hunter division, "Martingales of any type are prohibited in Under Saddle, hack and tie-breaking classes. Standing martingales are allowed for all over fence classes. All other martingales may be considered unconventional."

=== Breed shows ===
In some breed-specific shows, other types of bits, such as the Kimberwicke, are sometimes legal, but are not considered "classic" hunt seat bits, and riders moving from breed-specific to open competition are sometimes penalized severely if they use non-traditional equipment in open competition.

== Grooming and braiding ==
The horse must be very neat and well-presented. Hunter and equitation horses are to have braided manes and tails while showing, particularly at rated competition. If braiding is not possible, the mane is to at least be pulled neatly and lie flat on one side of the horse's neck. The dock of the tail is braided into a "French" style braid, which runs the length of the tailbone, with the remainder of the tail allowed to flow freely. In the United States, the hunt seat horse's tail is not "banged" (cut straight across to an even length), though banged tails are seen in Europe.

Horses usually have any long body hair trimmed short, particularly around the fetlocks, jaw, and ears. In some breeds and in some places, it is common to trim muzzle whiskers as well. Many exhibitors also trim a small bridle path by shaving a few inches of mane right behind the ears. The horses are usually bathed the day before a show, blanketed overnight to stay clean, and thoroughly groomed the day of the competition prior to entering the ring. Braiding of the mane and, when applicable, tail, is often done the night before or morning of the show, but can be completed earlier if precautions are taken to avoid having the horse rub out the braids.

== Rider attire ==
The show hunter and rider formally turned out for a major horse show. Horse is braided, rider wears a hunt coat, boots, breeches, and white ratcatcher shirt.

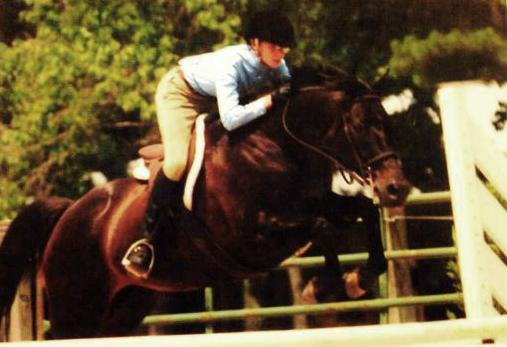
A hunter rider casually turned out for a small show or clinic, horse is not braided and rider is not wearing a jacket, but presentation remains neat and clean.

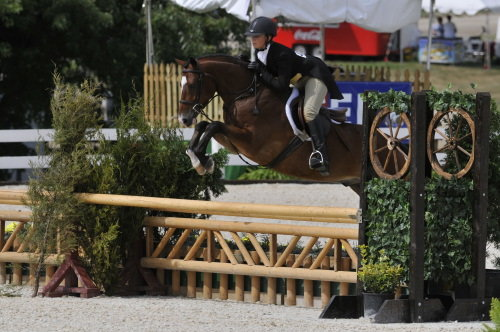
A hunter rider wearing the traditional shadbelly

The hunt seat rider is dressed conservatively. Classic attire for hunter classes consists of beige, tan or gray breeches, a white or light pastel shirt, and a black, navy, gray, "hunter" green or dark brown hunt coat. (Black is considered a dressage style, however, and though legal, is less often seen in Hunter classes.) Some years, patterns that appear solid at a distance, such as pinstripes, faint plaids or herringbone, are popular. In some competitions, the show management may choose to waive the jacket requirement if the heat and humidity is very high.

The show shirt, called a "ratcatcher," is a buttoned shirt with a stand-up mandarin-style collar covered by a separate, matching choker or a stock tie, the final look usually resembling that of a turtleneck. The traditional, classic shirt is white. However, in some places and at some types of less formal competition, particularly for children, pastel-colored shirts are popular, coordinated with the colors in the hunt coat. Traditionally shirts were long-sleeved, but today are more often short-sleeved or sleeveless, though sleeveless shirts cannot be worn when the jacket rule is waived. Stock pins are sometimes worn on the stock tie or choker, although the most recent fashion has been to embroider the rider's initials on the choker.

A recent trend in Hunter Classics and stakes classes is for Hunter riders wear a different styled coat called a shadbelly. This is a black coat cut short on the front midsection but worn long with tails in the back. The shadbelly is worn with a stock tie and pin and with taddersall points on the bottom. This coat is not seen in most hunter classes or at smaller shows, and is almost never required. This trend has been adopted from dressage competition where the shadbelly is worn in the upper levels. However, traditional hunt riders still wear the shorter hunt coat.

In some places, particularly breed-specific shows where tradition is not as strong, different colors of jackets and shirts are seen: riders sometimes wear tan, teal, light grey, or even dark violet coats with shirts in more vivid shades like green, orange, pink, lavender, and blue. Non-traditional attire is frowned upon and sometimes penalized in open competition.

The rider is usually required to wear an ASTM/SEI-approved equestrian helmet with safety harness fastened. Although black, velvet-covered hunt caps were once popular, the old style caps provided virtually no actual protection to the head and are now prohibited for junior riders at any time while mounted, and are not allowed on riders of any age in classes to jump. Caps are still sometimes seen on adult riders in flat classes, and remain somewhat popular at breed shows. However, many adult hunt seat riders who do not jump are also leaving behind the hunt cap in favor of ASTM/SEI-approved headgear.

Some helmets retain the classic velveteen covered look. Newer designs are characterized by a broader visor, a contrasting ventilation strip down the center, and, for women, a hair-catching cloth at the back. The ventilation strip has given this style of helmet the tongue-in-cheek nickname "skunk helmet". Helmets with vivid colors and designs are often worn by children, but usually covered with a black velvet cloth cover for show.

Riders 13 years or older generally wear tall, black field boots with breeches. Younger riders who still have rapidly growing feet may wear either brown or black jodhpur boots (sometimes called "paddock boots") and "jod straps" (strips of leather worn buckled under each knee for grip) with jodhpur pants.

Dark gloves should be worn, but are not required.

Attire for jumper classes resembles that of hunter riders, though may be less formal at lower levels. It is becoming acceptable in some regions and with some organizations for competitors to wear any collared shirt, such as a polo shirt, during very hot weather, rather than the traditional wool hunt coat and long-sleeved ratcatcher. For upper level competitions, such as classics and grand prixs, formal dress is usually required. This usually includes light-colored (usually shades of beige or a pale "canary" yellow) or white breeches, a white shirt, and a dark coat. Some riders are allowed to wear scarlet coats based on achievements in the sport.

== See also ==
- English pleasure
- English riding
- English saddle
- Equestrianism
- Jumping position
- Show hunter
- Show jumping
