= Hideaway's Erin Go Bragh =

Eventing horse

- Breed: Connemara
- Sire: Hideaway's Erin Smithereen
- Grandsire: Toreen Laddie
- Dam: Hideaway's Centerfold
- Maternal grandsire: Spring Ledge Bantry Bay
- Sex: Stallion
- Foaled: 1983
- Colour: Bay, white to half-pastern left hind
- Breeder: Mrs. Jacqueline Harris
- Owner: Mrs. Jacqueline Harris

Erin Go Bragh was a Connemara stallion who competed in the sport of eventing at the highest level. Also known as "The Little Horse that Could", Erin Go Bragh stood 14.3 hands (59 inches, 150 cm).

Go Bragh was known not only for his athletic ability, which helped the little horse compete at the international level in the sport of eventing, but also for his great character, gentleness, and heart. Although smaller than most jumpers, he had great confidence, and would reportedly jump anything he was pointed at.

Remarkably, Go Bragh began his competitive career not in eventing but in pleasure driving, where he was very successful. After jumping a 5-foot jumper course, the great show jumper Anne Kursinski told his rider that the horse had talent.

Go Bragh began his eventing career, and won four events in a row at the Preliminary level in 1991—including the MCTA Horse Trials with its notorious cross-country—before taking 1st at the Ledyard Three-Day in 1992. By this time, he was also a proficient second-level dressage horse. As an Intermediate horse, the stallion won Fair Hill, before moving up to the Advanced level in 1995. His performance that year won him the AHSA Advanced Horse of the Year award for Zone II, and the USCTA's Connemara of the Year award, that same year.

After his success, Go Bragh was entered in the Radnor Three Day Event the following year. He was at a distinct disadvantage: all horses competing at the international level had to carry a minimum of 165 lb (75 kg) on cross-country (this rule was abolished by the FEI the following year). This meant that Go Braugh would have to carry an additional 40 lb (18 kg) of lead, despite his small size. The extra weight caught up to him. While galloping cross-country, after travelling 14 miles (22.5 km) for phases A & C and jumping a steeplechase course, he stepped in a depression in the ground three fences from home, tearing a suspensory ligament. Although the injury was not career-ending, he needed a year off to recover.

Go Bragh was retired at the age of 16, as the most winning stallion in eventing history in North America. He was officially retired at the Genesee Valley Hunt Race Meet, on October 9, 1999. He continued to breed mares at Hideaway Farm. Go Bragh died at age 30 in October 2013.

The stallion sired nearly 200 foals, and his get have been extremely successful.

== Accomplishments (eventing) ==
1999

- 3rd Groton House Farm H.T. (Intermediate), winner of the Windrush Farm trophy
- 1st Waredaca H.T. (Preliminary)

1998

- 8th Groton House Farm H.T. (Advanced)
- 3rd Fair Hill H.T. (AI)
- 15th Morven Park Spring H.T.(Advanced)
- 15th Southern Pines H.T. (Intermediate)
- 11th Red Hills C.T. (Preliminary)

1997

- 5th Virginia H.T. (Preliminary)
- 6th MSCTDA Team Challenge & Three-day Event (Preliminary)

1996

- 3rd Millbrook Equestrian Center H.T. (Advanced)
- 9th GMHA H.T. (Intermediate)
- 29th Loudoun Hunt P.C. Spring H.T. (Preliminary)
- 13th Morven Park Spring H.T. (Advanced)
- 9th Southern Pines H.T. (Intermediate)
- 5th Jumping Branch Farm H.T. (Preliminary)

1995

- USCTA's Connemara of the Year
- 1st Middleburg H.T. (Intermediate)
- 5th Millbrook Equestrian Center H.T. (Advanced)
- 5th GMHA H.T. (Intermediate)
- 3rd Huntington Farm H.T. (Intermediate)
- 7th Groton House Farm H.T. (Intermediate)
- 1st Fair Hill H.T.(Intermediate)
- 9th Morven Park Spring H.T. (Intermediate)
- 4th Southern Pines H.T. (Preliminary)

1994

- 2nd Southern Pines H.T. (Preliminary)

1993

- 1st Fair Hill H.T.(Intermediate)
- 4th Millbrook Equestrian Center H.T. (Intermediate)
- 1st Stuart H.T.(Preliminary)
- 5th Groton House Farm H.T. (Intermediate)
- 3rd Bromont HT (Intermediate)
- 5th Loudoun Hunt H.T. (Intermediate)
- 1st Walthour-Moss Foundation H.T. (Preliminary)

1992

- 1st Ledyard Farm Three-Day Event CIC*
- 4th Genesee Valley Hunt H.T. (Preliminary)
- 2nd Genesee Valley Riding Club H.T. (Preliminary)
- 1st Winona H.T.(Preliminary)
- 1st MCTA H.T. (Preliminary)
- 2nd Pleasant Hollow Farms Inc. H.T. (Preliminary)
- Loudoun Hunt P.C. Spring H.T. (Preliminary)

1991

- 1st Somerset Hills H.T. (Preliminary)
- 4th Stoneleigh-Burnham School Summer H.T. (Preliminary)
- 1st Groton House Farm H.T. (Preliminary)
- 1st Genesee Valley Riding Club Spring H.T. (Preliminary)
- 1st Winona H.T. (Preliminary)
- 1st MCTA H.T. (Preliminary)

1990

- 2nd Genesee Valley Hunt H.T. (Preliminary)
- 2nd Erie Hunt and Saddle Club H.T. (Preliminary)
- 2nd Lost Hounds Pony Club H.T. (Preliminary)

1989

- 3rd Rhine Valley Farm Fall Horse Trials (Preliminary)
