= English pleasure =

Style of horse show class

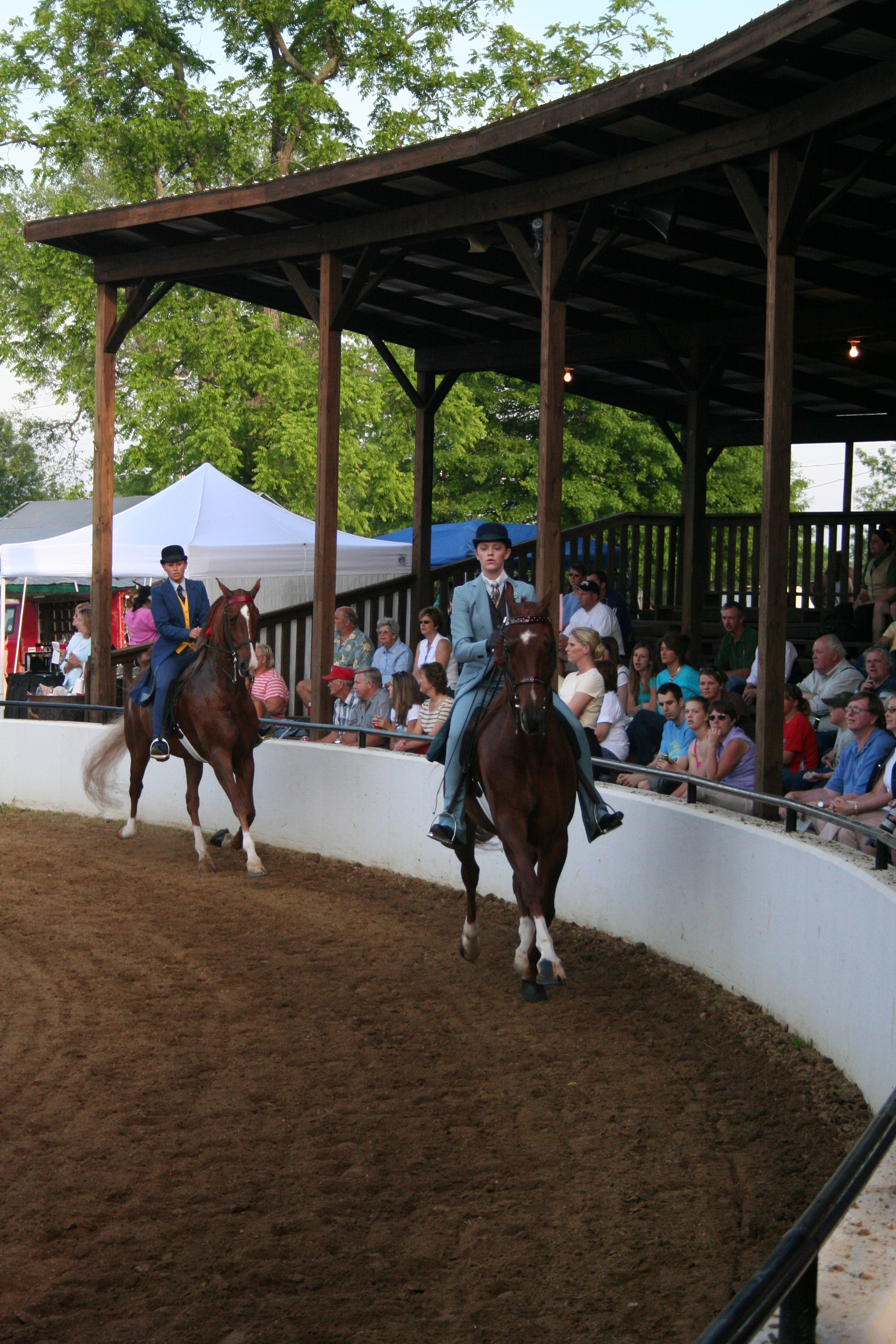
An English pleasure class for Saddle seat style horses. Hunt seat disciplines also offer English pleasure classes.

"English pleasure" is the generic term for a number of different English riding classes seen at horse shows in the United States, where the horse is ridden in either hunt seat or saddle seat tack.

In the average English pleasure class, the horses perform as a group, exhibiting the natural gaits of the walk, trot, and canter, and may also be asked to extend the trot or to perform a hand gallop. Horses are judged on their manners, performance, quality and conformation. The horse is to give the impression of being a pleasure to ride.

In the show hunter and hunt seat world, pleasure-type classes where the horses are not to jump are sometimes referred to as "flat" classes or "Hunter under saddle." In a variation on the pleasure class known as Hunter hack, riders may also be asked to have their horses jump two low jumps and back up. Show hack classes do not require jumping, but instead ask the horse to perform collected, regular, and extended versions of the walk, trot and canter, plus the hand gallop, usually attired in Dressage style equipment. In American Saddlebred breed competition, pleasure classes for five-gaited horses are sometimes offered, and at shows for "gaited" breeds such as the Tennessee Walker and the Missouri Fox Trotter, English pleasure classes substitute the breed's particular ambling gait for the trot.

The horse is usually ridden on contact with the rein, and the horse is penalized if it must be ridden on strong contact, gapes its mouth, does not respond willingly to light aids, or does not travel in balance. The horse should move straight, with a steady rhythm and a free and flowing stride. The horse should not come behind the bit, or travel too fast.

Hunter type movement (long and low) is preferred for hunter style horses. High action is preferred for English pleasure horses ridden saddle seat.

When showing in an English Pleasure or Hunt Seat class, the rider must be wearing the proper attire. This includes an English style jacket. The jacket can be different colors, depending on the style of riding. Most jackets are a dark grey, navy blue, or black. Underneath the coat the rider must have a collared shirt. Some shows and different events allow colored shirts, but the standard is a white or neutral color. The shirt can be either long or short sleeved. The rider must wear breeches. Depending on the show and event, the color of the breeches can vary from different shades of tan, gray, or white. English boots are also a requirement. Spurs are optional. Another requirement of the rider's attire is a helmet, or hunt cap. The style can vary depending on the event. Some styles of riding also require gloves to be worn, but for others gloves are optional.

== See also ==
- English riding
- English saddle
- Horse show
- Hunt seat
- List of equestrian sports
- Pleasure riding
- Saddle seat
