= Soring =

Using chemicals to force a horse's gait

Soring is the use of chemicals, pressure or devices to cause pain to the front feet and legs of horses when they touch the ground. This results in the horses picking up their front feet higher and faster than they would do naturally. Sometimes called "fixing", it is an abusive and prohibited practice, illegal in the U.S. under the Horse Protection Act of 1970 (HPA). It is closely associated with show ring Tennessee Walking Horses, where they exhibit an exaggerated high-stepping action of the front legs at all gaits, but particularly at the running walk, known as the "big lick." Under normal circumstances, "big lick" action is created by horseshoes that have added pads and weight (sometimes called "stacks"), usually combined with additional weighted chains or rollers placed around the pasterns to create dramatic, high-stepping action of the horse's front legs desired in competition. Practitioners of soring do so because they believe that the pain associated with this practice exaggerates the "big lick" to a greater degree and gives them a competitive edge over horses that are not treated in this manner. Other breeds that have a history of soring abuses include the Racking Horse and the Spotted Saddle Horse. Both criminal and civil penalties can be assessed against individuals who engage in soring.

Soring practices include the application of chemicals such as mustard oil or diesel fuel, misuse of mechanical devices such as overweight chains, or engaging in practices such as trimming a hoof to expose the sensitive tissue. Tennessee Walking Horses are not allowed to be shown without passing a USDA and HPA physical inspection for current and past evidence of soring. This includes scarring on their pastern as it is associated with soring.

Soring is sometimes confused with specialized shoeing for animated performance. While controversy also surrounds the use of long toes, heavy shoes, stacked pads, and weighted chains around the pasterns to enhance a horse’s gait, this is separate from the practice of soring.

== History ==
During the late 1940s and early 1950s, when Tennessee Walking Horses enjoyed a surge of widespread popularity with the general public, as the exaggerated front leg action, especially at the running walk, drew spectators to horse shows and helped increase the popularity of the breed. This action was also rewarded by judges. This began the rage for "big lick" movement. While "lite shod" horses with naturally good movement could comfortably perform this crowd-pleasing gait at the time, it took both natural ability and considerable time to properly train and condition the horse.

Some individuals, wishing to produce similar movement in less talented horses or in less time, borrowed practices used by other breeds to enhance movement. This included action devices such as weighted shoes, "stacks" (stacked pads), and the use of weighted chains around the pasterns, all of which were allowed within certain limits.

As these methods produced horses that won in the show ring, and as ever-higher and more dramatic action was rewarded by the judges, some trainers turned to less savory methods to produce high action in a hurry. These methods include excessively heavy weighted chains, use of tacks deliberately placed under the shoe into the "white line", or quick, of the hoof, trimming the sole of the hoof to the point that it bleeds or is bruised, increasing the weight of the stacked pads by driving in a large number of concealed nails and the controversial practice of "soring", which is the application of a caustic chemical agent to the pastern of the front legs to cause pain when the chains bang against the pastern with every step. The outcome of these practices is so much pain in the horse's front hooves that the horse snatches its feet off the ground as fast as possible in an attempt to alleviate the pain. Correspondingly, the horse steps under itself as far as possible with its hind legs to relieve the forelegs of weight. This results in the "squatting" body outline (hindquarters extremely lowered, forelegs flung very high) typical of the "big lick" horse. Such abuses are illegal under the Horse Protection Act of 1970 but are still practiced.

Measures have been taken to stop the practice, and many supporters of the Tennessee Walking Horse have organized to oppose soring. The HPA, created specifically to stop such practices and to monitor the Tennessee Walking Horse in particular, prohibits the use of soring agents. The Animal and Plant Health Inspection Service (APHIS), part of the USDA, is working with the industry to enforce the law. Tennessee Walking Horse organizations send designated qualified persons (DQPs) to shows to inspect the horses, and, as funding permits, APHIS sends federally employed veterinary medical officers to work with DQPs at some shows.

Trainers who oppose soring have formed and joined alternative breed organizations, including the National Walking Horse Association (NWHA) and Friends of Sound Horses (FOSH). All of these organizations promote the sound Tennessee Walking Horse. In addition, in 2005, the national directors of the Tennessee Walking Horse Breeders' and Exhibitors' Association (TWHBEA) voted to remove themselves from the National Horse Show Commission (NHSC), the sanctioning body closest to the soring issues. The TWHBEA formed its own sanctioning body and developed a new rule book and strict guidelines for affiliated horse shows and Horse Industry Organizations [HIO] that applied and were examined by the APHIS. The issue remains very controversial, particularly in Kentucky and Tennessee.

== Methods and clinical signs ==
Soring has been declared "cruel" and "inhumane" by the United States Congress. Similarly, the American Veterinary Medical Association (AVMA) has described it as "inhumane" and "unethical".

The legal definition of soring in the Horse Protection Act of 1970 is:

(A) an irritating or blistering agent has been applied, internally or externally, by a person to any limb of a horse,
(B) any burn, cut, or laceration has been inflicted by a person on any limb of a horse,
(C) any tack, nail, screw, or chemical agent has been injected by a person into or used by a person on any limb of a horse, or
(D) any other substance or device has been used by a person on any limb of a horse or a person has engaged in a practice involving a horse, and, as a result of such application, infliction, injection, use, or practice, such horse suffers, or can reasonably be expected to suffer, physical pain or distress, inflammation, or lameness when walking.

Clinical signs of a sored horse include:

- Granulation tissue or scars are visible on the pasterns or coronary band.
- Wavy hair growth or hair loss is visible in the pastern area.
- The horse's pasterns have darker hair than the rest of the horse's coat.
- The horse at rest stands with its weight unnaturally shifted to its hind legs, sometimes described as "standing in a bucket".
- The horse carries its hocks low and may twist them outward when moving.
- The horse lies down for extended periods of time, and is resistant to standing up.
- The horse resists handling of its hooves.
- The horse has difficulty walking, and may fall.

=== Chemical soring and pressure shoeing ===
One method of soring involves using chemical agents such as mustard oil, kerosene, or other caustic substances on the pasterns, bulbs of the heel, or coronary bands of the horses, causing burning or blistering of the horses' legs to accentuate their gaits. Dimethyl sulfoxide (DMSO) is sometimes added to increase the effect. The treated area is then often wrapped in plastic while the chemicals are absorbed. The chemical agents cause extreme pain, and usually lead to scarring. A distinctive scarring pattern is a characteristic indication of soring, so practitioners may attempt to disguise the scarring with a dye, or the horse's legs may be treated with salicylic acid to reduce scarring. These chemicals are harmful, usually quite toxic, and sometimes carcinogenic, such that practitioners must use a brush and wear gloves when applying them.

Other methods of soring include pressure shoes, where the hoof is trimmed to the quick so that the sole is in direct contact with the pad or shoe. The horse may then be "road foundered", ridden up and down hard surfaces on the over-trimmed hooves, until they are very sore. Trainers sometimes place objects, such as metal beads, nails, or screws, under the pad, causing intense pressure, although this practice has begun to decrease with the use of fluoroscopy to detect such methods. Abusive use of chains (such as using them with chemical soring agents) is also a common practice.

=== Action devices ===
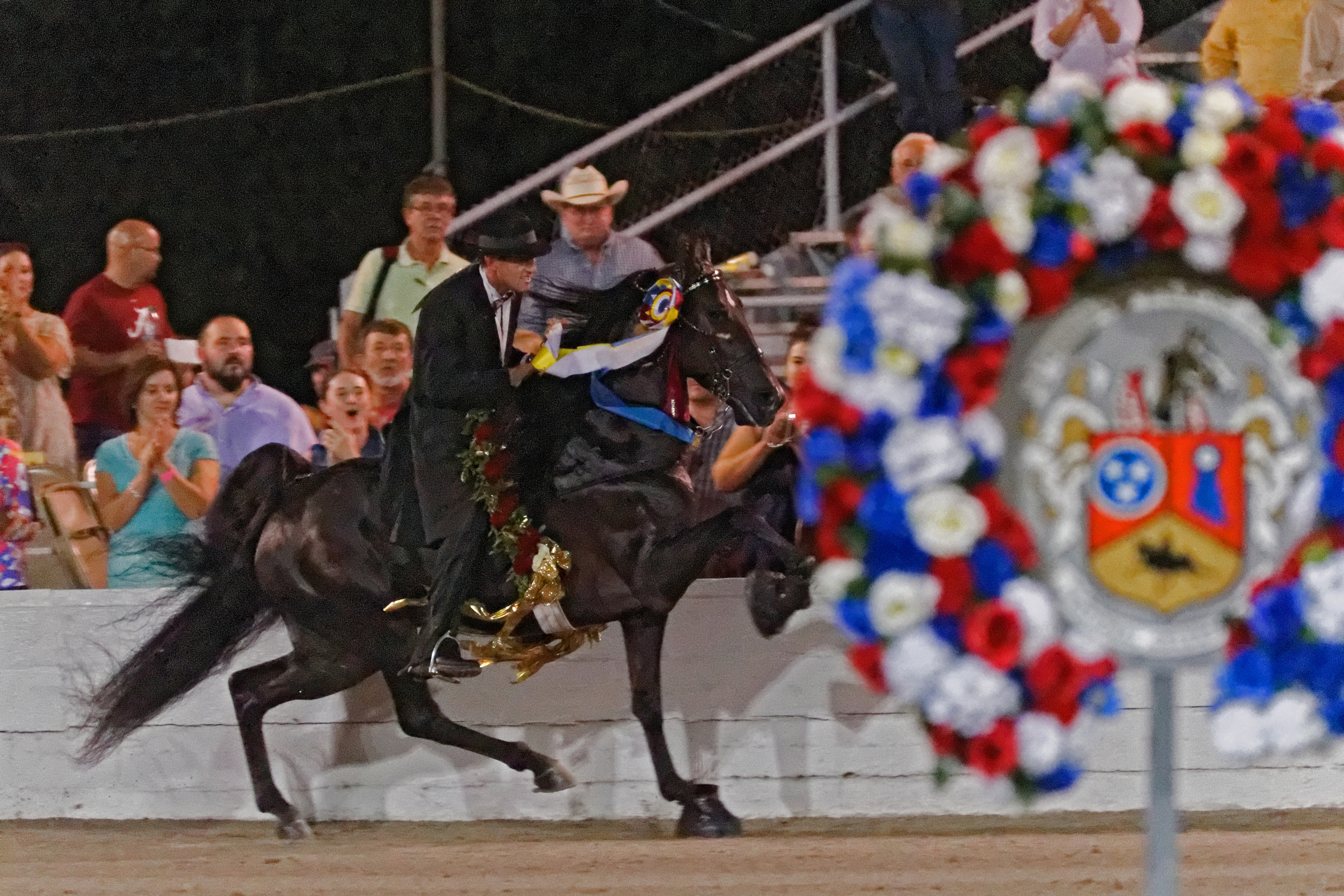
A "big lick" Tennessee Walker wearing legal action devices in 2013. This horse passed USDA inspection to be allowed to compete.

"Action devices" include "stacks", which are multiple pads between hoof and ground; and "chains", bracelet-like chains or rollers placed around the pastern. Illegal use occurs if irritants have been placed on the same area of the horse's foot or leg. The movement of a chain over a chemically traumatized area of the leg increases the painful response, resulting in the exaggerated gait.

Soring is always illegal under federal law, but use of chains varies depending on the show-sanctioning organization. The United States Equestrian Federation (USEF), the national governing body for equestrian sport in the U.S., disallows any use of devices or chemical compounds. However, the Tennessee Walking Horse Breeders' and Exhibitors' Association, which sanctions many shows, is not affiliated with the USEF and exempts some devices.

New legislation to update the HPA may lead to restrictions on these devices.

==== Stacks ====
Stacks
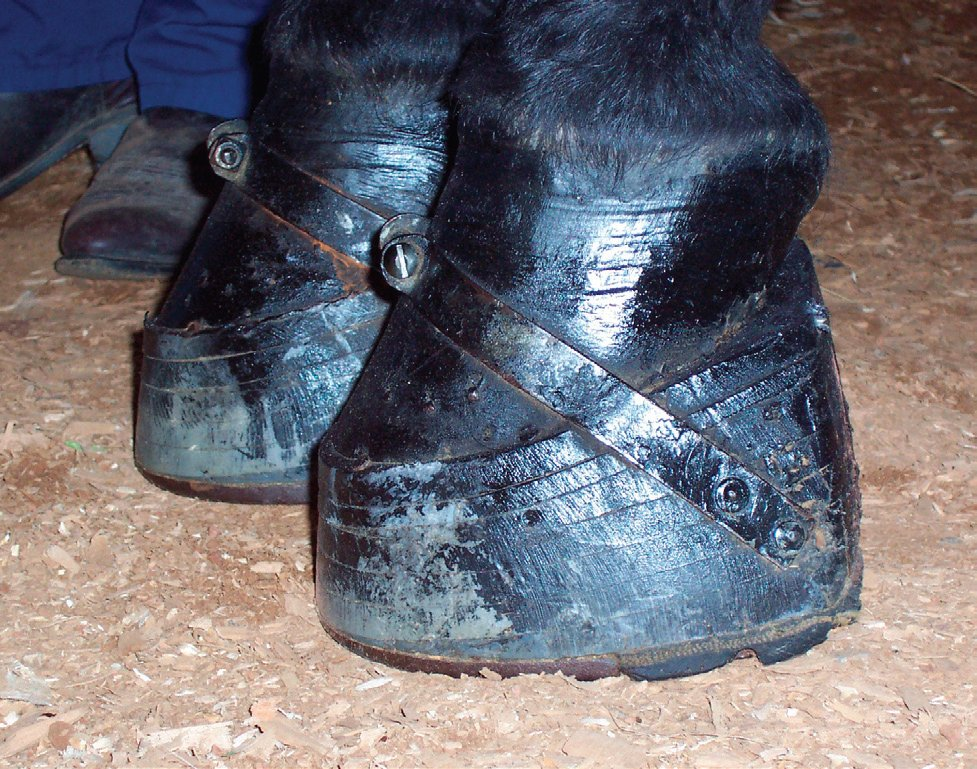
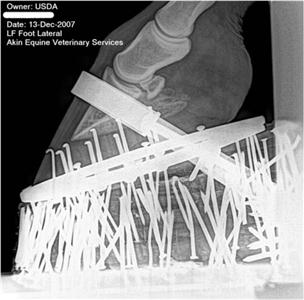
Stacks are built-up pads under the hoof, held on by a band over the front of the hoof. This image show nails added for additional weight and possibly pressure.

Stacks are also called "performance packages" or "pads". Stacks are composed of multiple hoof-shaped pads, usually made of plastic, although they can also be made of leather, rubber, polyurethane or even wood. Normally, single relatively thin pads, either flat or with a small wedge-shape, are used with horseshoes in many circumstances and can protect the sole of the hoof or make simple alterations to action. But when stacked into an action device, they may be up to 4 inches (10 cm) thick in the heel and 2 inches (5 cm) thick in the toe. Stacks of pads that are built up on a horseshoe have a metal band that runs across the front of the hoof to help keep them on the horse's foot. This design is an extension of a base shoe, and can be taken off or changed without having to completely re-shoe the horse. While the design is intended to exaggerate the horse's action, the shape of the stacks and added weight to the horse's foot cause the foot to strike with more force and at an abnormal angle. Soring occurs when items are concealed between the pad and hoof such that painful pressure occurs to the sole of the hoof making the horse lift its feet faster and higher. Permissible thickness and weight vary between categories of competition.

The use of stacks is controversial. Some criticize the band that holds the stack on, which they believe cuts into the hoof and may wear a slot into it. However, trainers commonly loosen the band when the horse is not being exercised, which may minimize the problem. Under normal conditions, if a stack is lost, it usually only affects the pads and not the base shoe, which remains intact. Injuries are usually very limited from "throwing" (accidental separation of) a set of pads. It is dangerous if a horse wearing stacks pulls off a shoe, as not only will the stack come off, but the band may tear off part of the hoof wall. Horses wearing stacks should not be turned out.

==== Chains ====
Bracelet-like chains are attached around the front pasterns of the horse, but to be legal, must weigh no more than 6 ounces (170 g). They are intended to be used with a lubricant to allow them to slide easily along the pastern. Users of chains do not believe they cause the horse pain, stating that it creates a similar feeling to a loose bracelet. However, they may be harmful above a certain weight. In 1982, a study at Auburn University examined the health effects of action devices on gaited horses through the use of thermography. The researchers conclude that chains "altered thermal patterns as early as day 2 of exercise with chains. These altered thermal patterns persisted as long as chains were used," with thermal patterns not returning to normal until 20 days after last use. A stallion in the study developed lesions from 8-ounce (230 g) chains, after wearing them in nine 15-minute exercise periods over 11 days. Whereas 2-, 4-, and 6-ounce chains (55, 115, and 170 g) produced no adverse effects in the horses being studied.

More important than the weight of the chains is the application of caustic materials on the skin of the horse under the chains—such as oil of mustard, croton oil, kerosene, and dimethyl sulfoxide (DMSO)—followed by wrapping the legs to "cook" the chemicals into the skin to render them tender. The chains then irritate the horse's legs. Measures are taken to obscure scars, lesions, and raw skin before show time.

Considered legal "action devices" in the industry, chains themselves are not harmful, but they rub against the already irritated skin and increase the horse’s pain. In response, his gait becomes flashy: He picks up his sored feet more quickly and lifts them higher than normal, and he shifts some of his weight to his hind end to escape the pain up front.

— Joanne Meszoly in EQUUS Special Report: Why Soring Persists (2020)

== Current status and legislation ==
Soring has been prohibited at sales and shows for decades but is still practiced. It can be detected by observing the horse for lameness, assessing its stance, and palpating the lower legs. Some trainers can bypass inspectors by training horses not to react to the pain that palpation may cause, often by severely punishing the horse for flinching after the sored area is palpated. The practice is sometimes called "stewarding" in reference to the horse show steward, who is often the first line of rule enforcement at any horse show. Trainers may also time the use of the agents so that chemicals will not be detected when the horse is examined, but will be in effect when the rider goes into the ring. Others use topical anesthetics, which are timed to wear off before the horse goes into the show ring. Pressure shoeing is also used, eliminating use of chemicals altogether. Trainers who sore their horses leave the show grounds when they find that the more stringent federal inspectors are present.

In 2006, owing to new techniques in both soring and detection, the USDA began a larger crackdown on soring within the industry. A new device known as a "sniffer" (also used to detect the chemical presence of bombs in airport security), whereby swabbed samples are taken from the horse and then "sniffed", can now be employed. At the 2006 Tennessee Walking Horse Celebration, the long-standing dispute between trainers and USDA inspectors came to a head. The inspectors disqualified six of ten horses from showing on the night of Friday, August 25, 2006. The trainers denied soring and challenged the monitoring methods. The result was that a number of celebration championship classes were canceled; considerable controversy over the situation still exists. After a yearlong discussion between the industry and the USDA over the issues raised at the 2006 show, the 2007 championship went off without significant controversy.

An investigation by ABC News into the training methods of Tennessee Walking Horses revealed that many horses had been beaten to produce their signature high-stepping gait. In a video shot by the Humane Society of the United States, high-profile trainer Jackie McConnell is seen beating horses, using electric cattle prods, and soring their hooves with caustic chemicals. Additionally, a random inspection by the Department of Agriculture at the 2011 annual championship found that all of the 52 horses inspected had a foreign substance applied to their front hooves, either to cause pain or to hide it.

In June 2012, the American Association of Equine Practitioners and the American Veterinary Medical Association jointly issued a call to ban both action devices (chains, rollers, etc.) and "performance packages", e.g., stacks or pads.

At the 2013 Tennessee Walking Horse National Celebration, USDA testing showed that 67% of the horses tested positive for substances that could be used to hide soring.

In April 2024, the USDA announced a new federal rule, effective February 2025, strengthening the Animal and Plant Health Inspection Service's enforcement of the Horse Protection Act regarding soring. The changes eliminate industry self-regulation and the use of chemical soring, action devices, stacks, and shoeing abuses.

== Legal cases ==
=== Jackie McConnell case ===
Jackie McConnell, a Tennessee Walking Horse trainer, owns Whittier Stables in Collierville, Tennessee. Once a prominent figure in the industry and hall of fame trainer, in 2012 McConnell pleaded guilty to 12 counts of animal cruelty and of violating the federal Horse Protection Act. Formal sanctions were imposed on Jackie McConnell by the US Department of Agriculture pursuant to the Horse Protection Act numerous times between 1979 and 2012. According to Roy Exum of The Chattanoogan, "McConnell has a known record that includes over 30 unbroken years of persistent violations of the federal Horse Protection Act, but because laws have been so lax, he has done little more than wink and continue on his way."

In 1986, McConnell was named Trainer of the Year by the Walking Horse Trainers Association. However, he had a long history of violations: In September 1998, McConnell entered a sored horse, Regal By Generator, in the 1998 Tennessee Walking Horse National Celebration and received a civil fine of $2,200 and a five-year disqualification from October 31, 2006, through October 30, 2011. In September 1989, McConnell was charged for exhibiting Executive Order (owned by Floyd Sherman) in the Tennessee Walking Horse National Celebration in Shelbyville while sore. For that offense, he received a $2,000 civil fine and a two-year disqualification from March 19, 1995, through March 18, 1997. In May 1979, he entered the sored horse Threat's Black Power in the Ninth Annual Fun Show in Shelbyville, Tennessee. A USDA veterinarian classified this horse as the "sorest horse at the show", having an "exhausted, steaming, defeated appearance" and testified that the horse's front legs were covered with raised scars that when touched were found to be "very sore" causing "extreme pain". McConnell received a $750 civil penalty and a six-month disqualification from September 9, 1985, through March 8, 1986. McConnell was also disqualified for a violation of a unilateral sore (September 12, 2006, to September 25, 2006). McConnell was disqualified for a violation of the scar rule (September 6, 2005, to September 19, 2005). He was disqualified for a NHSC 5 Pt. Exam Score (August 8, 2004, to August 21, 2004). He was disqualified for a bilateral sore from August 31, 2003, to April 30, 2004. He was disqualified for a unilateral sore from October 6, 2002, to October 19, 2002. McConnell was disqualified for violation of terms of a five-year USDA disqualification and suspended from November 19, 2009, to May 18, 2010.

In April and May 2011, an undercover investigator shot footage at McConnell's stable. The footage revealed two workers, Jeff Dockery and John Mays, applying caustic substances that cause soring to horses' legs and hooves and beating the animals with a wooden beam and an electric cattle prod to make them stand still during leg palpation. Soon after the undercover footage was released, state authorities raided McConnell's barn. After ABC News aired the footage, McConnell was banned for life from the Tennessee Walking Horse organization's biggest event and stricken from its hall of fame.

In September 2012, McConnell was found in violation of the federal Horse Protection Act; he was sentenced to three years probation and fined $75,000. McConnell faced 52 counts of transporting and showing abused horses. He pleaded guilty to a single charge of animal cruelty in an agreement with prosecutors. US District Judge Harry Sandlin Mattice Jr. accepted McConnell's plea. McConnell faced up to five years in prison if the agreement had not been accepted. He was required by the court to write a letter about the soring of horses, the pain it causes, the long-term effects, and its widespread use.

McConnell also pleaded guilty in state court to 12 of 22 counts of animal cruelty in 2012. He was sentenced to one year of house arrest and a $25,000 fine. The Circuit Judge Weber McGraw sentenced Jackie McConnell and two co-defendants in July 2013. Jeff Dockery pleaded guilty to three counts of animal cruelty and John K. Mays to fourteen. Dockery was sentenced to three years of probation and Mays to four years of probation. Under the state plea agreement, McConnell is not allowed to either own or train horses for 20 years. The judge gave McConnell 120 days to sell his two remaining horses. According to The Commercial Appeal, "This is the second time all three men have pleaded guilty rather than face trial."

=== Lee and Mike McGartland case ===
In 2013 Lee and Mike McGartland entered a horse named The Royal Dollar in the 74th annual Red Carpet Show of the South. The Royal Dollar placed third in its class, but during a post-show inspection, a veterinary officer of the U.S. Department of Agriculture determined that The Royal Dollar was sore. From 2013 to 2016, the McGartlands received further official warnings and were identified as "violators" on the USDA web site. They sued the USDA, on the grounds that "the enforcement program denies due process to those accused of violations and breaks privacy laws by publishing personal information." Their lawsuit may have been linked to the removal of records of animal welfare cases from the USDA's web site.

== See also ==
- Horse Protection Act of 1970
