= Spotted Saddle Horse Breeders' and Exhibitors' Association =

American equestrian organization

The Spotted Saddle Horse Breeders' and Exhibitors' Association (SSHBEA) is an equestrian organization for the registration and promotion of the Spotted Saddle Horse breed. The SSHBEA is headquartered in Shelbyville, Tennessee.

== History ==
The SSHBEA was founded in 1984 (41 years ago), for the purpose of registering pinto horses with smooth ambling gaits. By 1987 it had registered over 3,000 horses. It is located in downtown Shelbyville, Tennessee.

== Competition ==
The SSHBEA sanctions multiple shows throughout the year. Registered horses may compete in either rail or sport horse classes. Horses shown in rail classes are exhibited at three gaits and must be shod with one of three types of horseshoe, which vary in weight and thickness. No action devices, such as pads or chains, are allowed.

The sport horse division includes speed classes such as barrel racing, pole bending and jumping; cattle working classes such as team penning and team sorting; and trail obstacle event classes. Sport horses are keg shod.
