= Spotted Saddle Horse =

American breed of horse

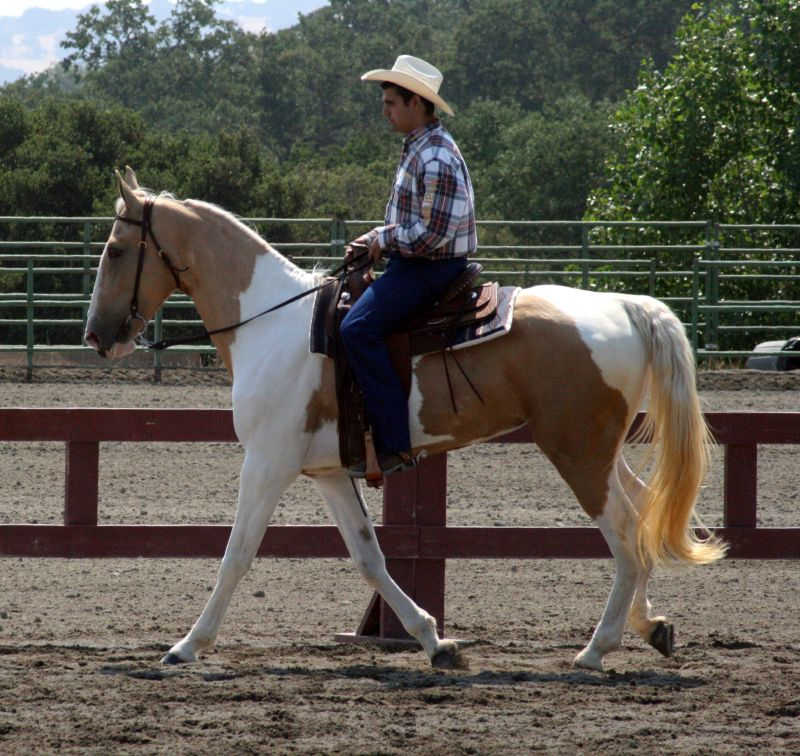
- Spotted Saddle Horse under saddle
- Other names: SSH
- Country of origin: United States

Traits
- Weight: 900 to 1,100 pounds (410 to 500 kg)
- Height: 14.3 to 16 hands (59 to 64 inches, 150 to 163 cm)
- Color: Any base color with pinto markings
- Color: Any base color with pinto markings
- Distinguishing features: Pinto coloration, ambling gait

Breed standards
- Spotted Saddle Horse Breeders' and Exhibitors' Association; National Spotted Saddle Horse Association

The Spotted Saddle Horse is a horse breed from the United States that was developed by crossing Spanish-American type gaited pinto ponies with gaited horse breeds, such as the Tennessee Walking Horse. The result was a colorful, smooth-gaited horse, used in the show ring and for pleasure and trail riding. Two registries have been created for the breed, one in 1979 and the other in 1985. The two have similar registration requirements, although one has an open stud book and the other is slightly more strict with regard to parentage requirements, having a semi-closed stud book. The Spotted Saddle Horse is a light riding horse, always pinto in color. Solid-colored foals from registered parents may be registered for identification purposes, so their pinto-colored foals have documented parentage. They always perform an ambling gait, rather than a trot, in addition to the gaits of walk and canter, performed by all breeds.

== Characteristics ==
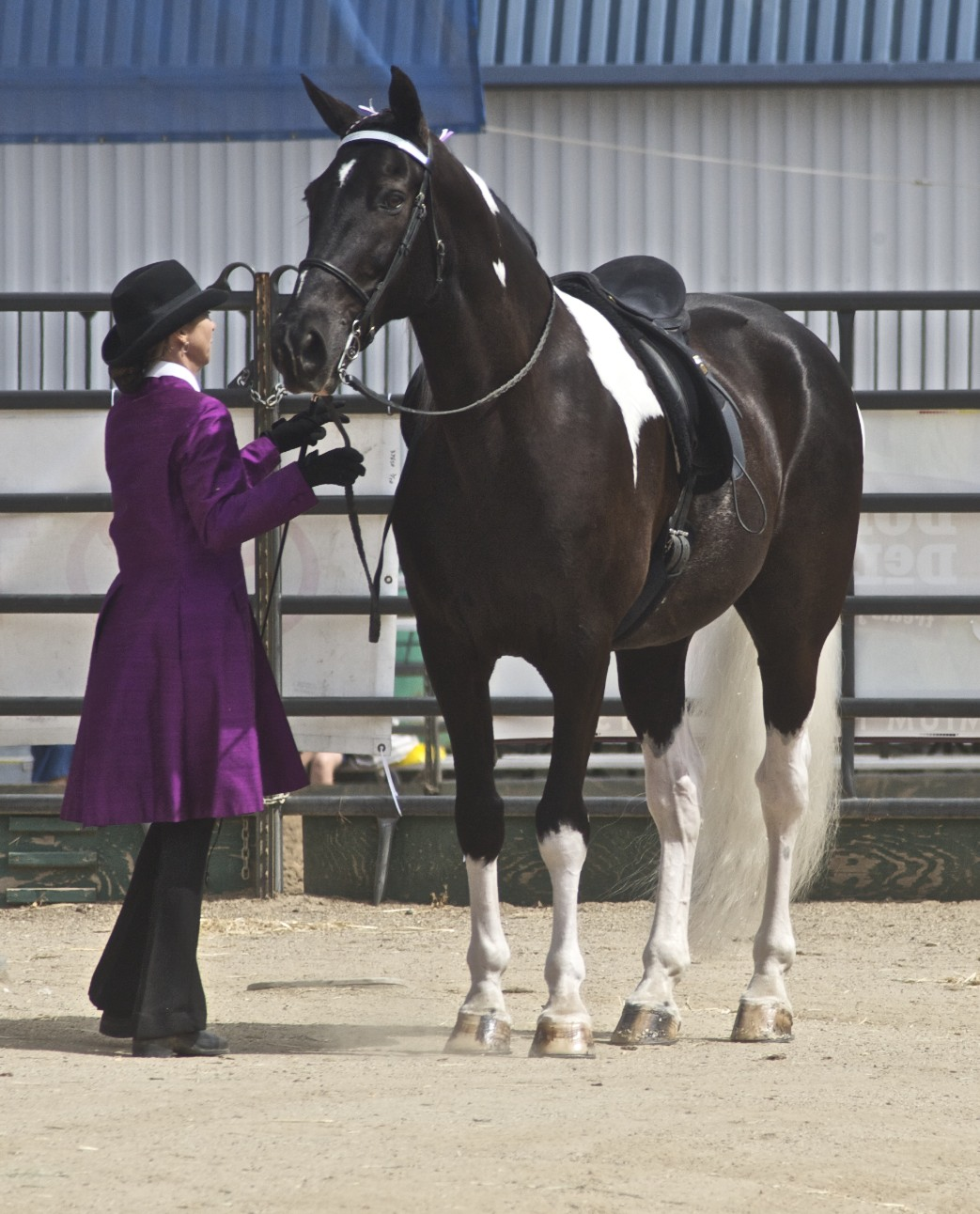
A black tobiano Spotted Saddle Horse

Spotted Saddle Horses are light riding horses. They average 14.3 to 16 hands (59 to 64 inches, 150 to 163 cm) high and weigh 900 to 1,100 pounds (410 to 500 kg). The NSSHA will register horses that are shorter, down to 13.3 hands (55 inches, 140 cm), although it considers taller horses to be the breed ideal. The head is refined, with a straight or slightly convex facial profile. The neck is muscular, with a slight arch, leading into long, sloping shoulders and a muscular chest. The back is short and the hindquarters muscular and broad. The croup is slightly sloping and rounded, with a high-set tail. The ideal Spotted Saddle Horse resembles a "smaller, slightly stockier Tennessee Walking Horse". Pinto coloration is required, with white spots on a background any equine coat color. Overo and tobiano are the two most common patterns, and the coverage of the white spots can range from minimal to almost complete.

To be registered with the NSSHA, Spotted Saddle Horses must display an ambling gait (they cannot trot) and have pinto coloration. As long as they meet these two requirements, they can have any breeds in their pedigree. Even if already registered as Racking Horses, Tennessee Walking Horses, Missouri Fox Trotters or other breeds, or from undocumented parentage, registration with the NSSHA is allowed. If a foal who has one or both parents registered with the NSSHA displays solid coat color (without pinto markings), it can be listed as having "identification" registration, and any spotted foals it has are considered to have NSSHA-documented parentage. Solid-colored, gaited mares and stallions can be registered as breeding stock, but are not considered to have full registration with the organization. Requirements for the SSHBEA are similar with regard to color and gait, including identification-only registration for solid colored foals of registered parents. However, one difference is that it is a semi-closed stud book, as a foal must have one or both parents listed with the SSHBEA to be registered by the SSHBEA.

=== Gaits ===
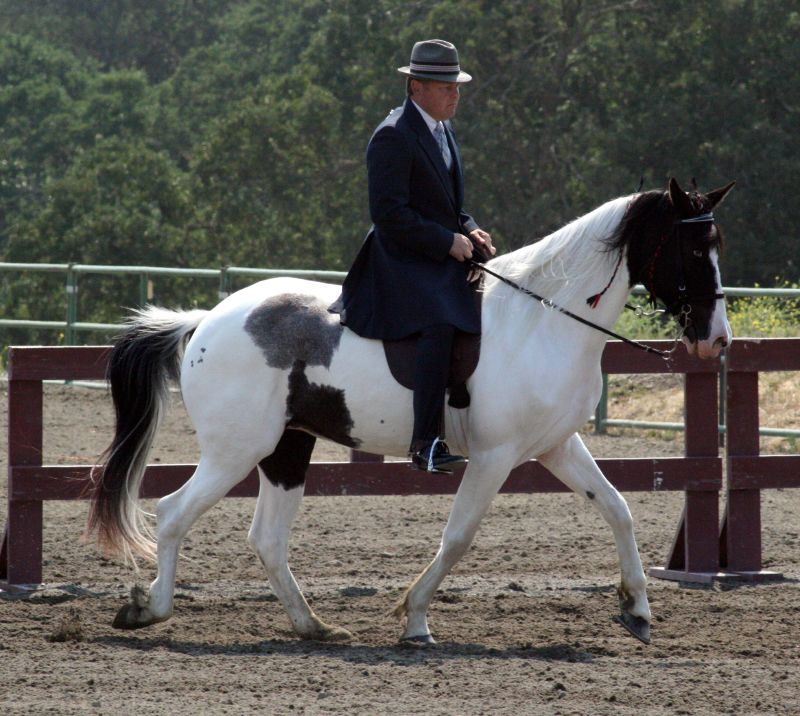
A Spotted Saddle Horse performing an ambling gait

The Spotted Saddle Horse is a gaited breed, meaning that they perform an intermediate-speed ambling gait instead of the trot. The flat walk, or show walk, is a regular four-beat walk, covering 4 to 8 miles per hour (6.4 to 12.9 km/h). The show gait is also a four-beat gait, similar to the flat walk with the exception of the speed. Horses traveling at a show gait can cover 10 to 20 miles per hour (16 to 32 km/h), with an extremely smooth motion. The third main gait is the canter, a three-beat gait performed by all breeds. Some members of the Spotted Saddle Horse breed can also perform the rack, stepping pace, fox-trot, single-foot or other variations of ambling gaits, all intermediate gaits, but differentiated by the pattern of foot-falls.

== Breed history ==
The Spotted Saddle Horse developed from small gaited pinto ponies of Spanish ancestry. These were crossed with larger American breeds such as the Morgan and Standardbred, developed after the American Revolution, to increase size while retaining coloration and the desired gait. After the American Civil War, additional gaited blood was added, with contributing breeds including the Tennessee Walking Horse, Missouri Fox Trotter, Paso Fino and Peruvian Paso. Mustangs from the American West were also incorporated. Originally developed in central Tennessee, and selectively bred for pinto coloration, they were used for general pleasure and trail riding.

There are two breed registries for the Spotted Saddle Horse. In 1979, the National Spotted Saddle Horse Association (NSSHA) was organized in Murfreesboro, Tennessee. The association focuses on promoting naturally-gaited saddle horses with pinto coloration. The NSSHA is adamant about disallowing cruel and inhumane training and showing practices, including soring, sometimes seen in other elements of the Spotted Saddle Horse industry, and prohibited by the Horse Protection Act of 1970 (HPA). The NSSHA also bans the use of action devices (such as chains or other weights around the pasterns) and performance packages (stacks of pads attached to the shoe, sometimes weighted or used to conceal abusive shoeing practices) in their shows, which goes beyond the protection afforded by the HPA. In 1985, the Spotted Saddle Horse Breeders' and Exhibitors' Association (SSHBEA) was formed, headquartered in Shelbyville, Tennessee. The SSHBEA is recognized as a "Horse Industry Organization" (HIO) under the HPA, and occasionally sees violations of the HPA at their shows. Violations of the HPA are addressed in the SSHBEA rulebook, and violations can result in disqualifications from individual shows or extended suspensions from Spotted Saddle Horse showing. Today, the Spotted Saddle Horse is seen at horse shows, as well as being used for pleasure and trail riding.
