= Horse Protection Act of 1970 =

United States federal law banning soring of horses

- Long title: An act to prohibit the movement in interstate or foreign commerce of horses which are "sored", and for other purposes
- Acronyms (colloquial): HPA
- Enacted by: the 91st United States Congress
- Effective: December 9, 1970

Citations
- Public law: 91-540
- Statutes at Large: 84 Stat. 1404 (1970)

Codification
- Titles amended: 15
- U.S.C. sections created: 1821-1831

Legislative history
- Introduced in the Senate as S. 2543 by Joseph Tydings (D‑MD); Signed into law by President Richard Nixon on December 9, 1970

Major amendments
- amended Pub.L. 94–360, 90 Stat. 915, enacted July 13, 1976

The Horse Protection Act of 1970 (HPA); (codified 15 U.S.C. §§ 1821–1831 (Note: Full details: Pub. L. 91–540, 84 Stat. 1404, enacted December 9, 1970, amended Pub. L. 94–360, 90 Stat. 915, enacted July 13, 1976, codified 15 U.S.C. §§ 1821–1831)) is a United States federal law, under which the practice of soring is a crime punishable by both civil and criminal penalties, including fines and jail time. It is illegal to show a horse, enter it at a horse show, or to auction, sell, offer for sale, or transport a horse for any of these purposes if it has been sored.

Soring is the practice of applying irritants or blistering agents to the front feet or forelegs of a horse, making it pick its feet up higher in an exaggerated manner that creates the movement or "action" desired in the show ring. Soring is an act of animal cruelty that gives practitioners an unfair advantage over other competitors. The Horse Protection Act of 1970 is enforced by the Animal and Plant Health Inspection Service (APHIS), a branch of the United States Department of Agriculture (USDA). Although violations of the law are seen most often in the Tennessee Walking Horse industry, the Horse Protection Act covers all breeds.

Originally all inspectors were from APHIS, but a lack of funding led to a 1976 amendment to the act, which allows non-USDA employees to be trained and certified as inspectors. This program has not always been successful, with some non-USDA inspectors being more lenient on violators than others, and citations for violations tend to increase significantly when USDA inspectors are present at a show. Several methods are used to detect violations of the act, including observation, palpation and gas chromatography/mass spectrometry to identify chemicals on horses' legs. Certain training techniques and topical anesthetics can be used to avoid detection by the first two methods. There have been a number of unsuccessful challenges to the act on the grounds on constitutionality, as well as challenges on varying other issues. In 2013, an amendment to the act was proposed in the United States House of Representatives. The amendment would allow only USDA employees to perform inspections, toughen penalties for violations, and outlaw the use of action devices and "stacks", or layers of pads attached to the bottom of the front hooves.

== Background ==
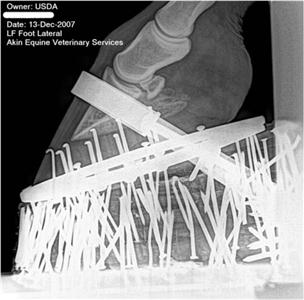
X-Ray image of a "performance package" on a Tennessee Walking Horse, showing shoe and "stacks" – multiple pads, extra nails placed in pads to add weight to the foot, possibly pressure on the sole – and band across hoof to hold it all on.

Soring began in the 1950s with gaited horse (Note: A gaited horse is one that performs a smooth, four-beat intermediate speed ambling gait.) trainers who were looking to improve their chances of winning at horse shows. To do this, they developed methods to enhance the desired high action gaits to levels greater than that produced by traditional training methods. Thus began the use of irritants, including chemicals and physical objects, or abusive shoeing and hoof-trimming practices on the front legs. Attempting to relieve the pain in its legs, a sored horse lifts its front feet off the ground more quickly, creating a flashier gait. By the 1960s, soring had gained popularity, as horses so treated gained an edge in competition. However, public opposition to the practice also grew, and in 1966, the American Horse Protection Association was created in part to address the issue of soring. In 1969, Senator Joseph Tydings sponsored legislation to prohibit soring, leading to the passing of the Horse Protection Act in 1970, amended in 1976. While Tennessee Walking Horses, Racking Horses and other "high-stepping breeds" are generally targeted by these abusive practices, the Horse Protection Act covers all breeds.

Soring is defined by the HPA with four meanings:

(3)(A) an irritating or blistering agent has been applied, internally or externally, by a person to any limb of a horse,
(B) any burn, cut, or laceration has been inflicted by a person on any limb of a horse,
(C) any tack, nail, screw, or chemical agent has been injected by a person into or used by a person on any limb of a horse, or
(D) any other substance or device has been used by a person on any limb of a horse or a person has engaged in a practice involving a horse, and, as a result of such application, infliction, injection, use, or practice, such horse suffers, or can reasonably be expected to suffer, physical pain or distress, inflammation, or lameness when walking.

== Contents ==
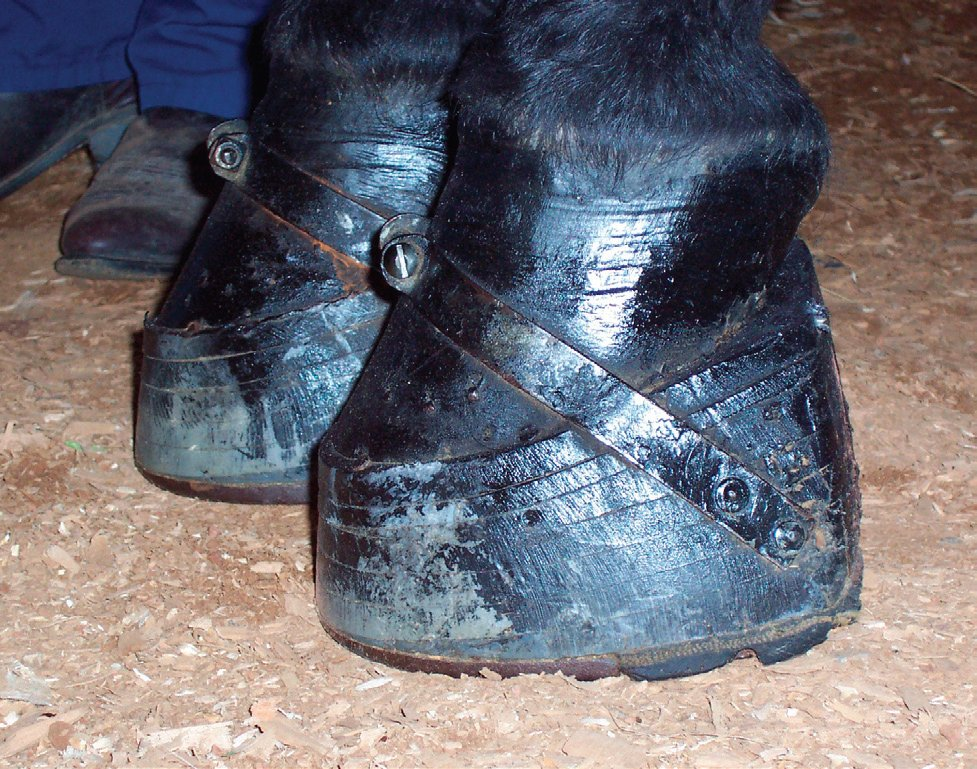
"Stacks", or layers of pads attached to the front hooves, were legal as of 2015 but could be prohibited under proposed new amendments.

The Horse Protection Act is found in Title 15 of the United States Code, which covers commerce and trade. Section (§) 1821 covers the definitions of the terms used in the act and §1822 details the Congressional statement of findings. The requirements placed upon horse shows and exhibitions are covered in §1823. §1824 covers the core provisions of the act, prohibiting the "shipping, transporting, moving, delivering, or receiving of any horse which is sore" as well as the actual showing, exhibition, entry into a show, sale, or auction of a sored horse, including offering a sored horse for sale, as well as outlining the responsibilities of show management and recordkeeping requirements. The export of horses is covered in §1824a. §1825 covers penalties for violations detailed previously in the act, which may be civil or criminal, with fines of up to $50,000 and imprisonment of up to five years. §1826 details the required notice of violations to the Attorney General of the United States. The utilization of USDA and state government staff is covered in §1827, as is non-financial assistance to states. Rules and regulations pertaining to the act's statutes are covered in §1828. §1829 covers federal preemption of state laws, concurrent jurisdiction, and prohibitions on certain state actions. §1830 is currently reserved for future use, and §1831 details the authorization of appropriations for expenses related to the enforcement of the provisions of the act.

== Implementation ==
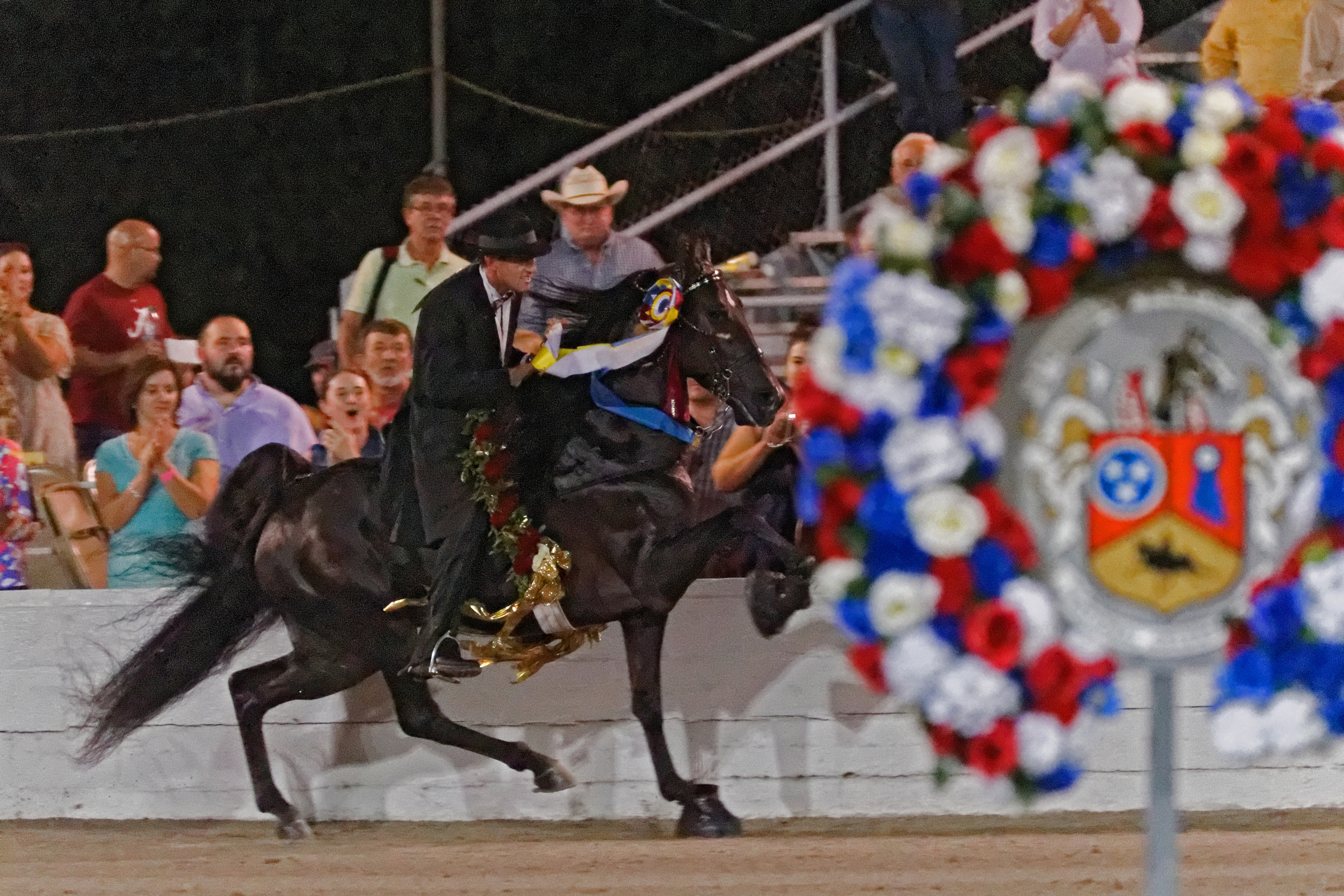
A "big lick" Tennessee Walker wearing legal action devices in 2013. This horse passed USDA inspection to be allowed to compete.

As originally enacted, the Horse Protection Act was to be enforced by Animal and Plant Health Inspection Service (APHIS), a branch of the USDA. However, a lack of staff and funding meant little success, leading to the 1976 amendment to the act. With this amendment, Congress created a Designated Qualified Person (DQP) program. This program allows non-USDA employees from within the equine community to take training and certification programs run by Horse Industry Organizations (HIOs) and supervised by the USDA; after completing the training, they may complete inspections for violations of the HPA at public events. The USDA is then able to double check the work of DQP participants by making random inspections at a small number of shows. One member of the Tennessee Walking Horse world states that this creates "the potential for a "fox guarding the chicken coop" situation", as if the HIO is not fully interested in preventing or detecting the practice of soring, the DQPs may not be fully trained or may deliberately overlook instances of soring. When APHIS inspectors are present at horse shows, the number of citations for violations increases significantly. Competitors and trainers at shows, viewing themselves as unjustly persecuted, have been known to leave when they find APHIS inspectors present, rather than allowing the inspectors to see their horses. In June 2012, the USDA published a new rule requiring violations found by HIOs to have penalties assessed at a rate equal to or exceeding those given by APHIS inspectors. Previously, HIOs were allowed to set their own penalty rates, resulting in some organizations acting leniently towards violators of the HPA.

For the first decades following passage of the act, foreign substances applied to the legs, including chemicals, were detected by feel, sight or smell. Since 2006, the USDA has used gas chromatography/mass spectrometry to identify chemicals found on horses' legs at events. Samples of suspicious substances are swabbed at the show, and sent to a laboratory for analysis; owners and trainers are later informed of the results. However, this method is only used by APHIS veterinary medical officers at present.

Soring can be also detected by observing the horse for lameness, assessing its stance and palpating the lower legs. Some trainers evaded detection from inspectors by training horses not to react to the pain that palpation may cause, often by severely punishing the horse for flinching after the sored area is touched. The practice is called "stewarding", in reference to the horse show steward. Others use topical anesthetics, such as lidocaine and benzocaine, which are timed to wear off before the horse goes into the show ring. Use of chemicals can be completely avoided if pressure shoeing is also used. This process involves placing some type of hard foreign object (such as a small piece of wood, stone, hard acrylic, or sharp object such as a tack or nail) against the sole of the horse's foot before applying the horseshoe and pads. It can also be done by trimming down the horse's hoof to its sensitive structures, then shoeing. Either method causes pain when the horse places its foot on the ground.

== Impact ==
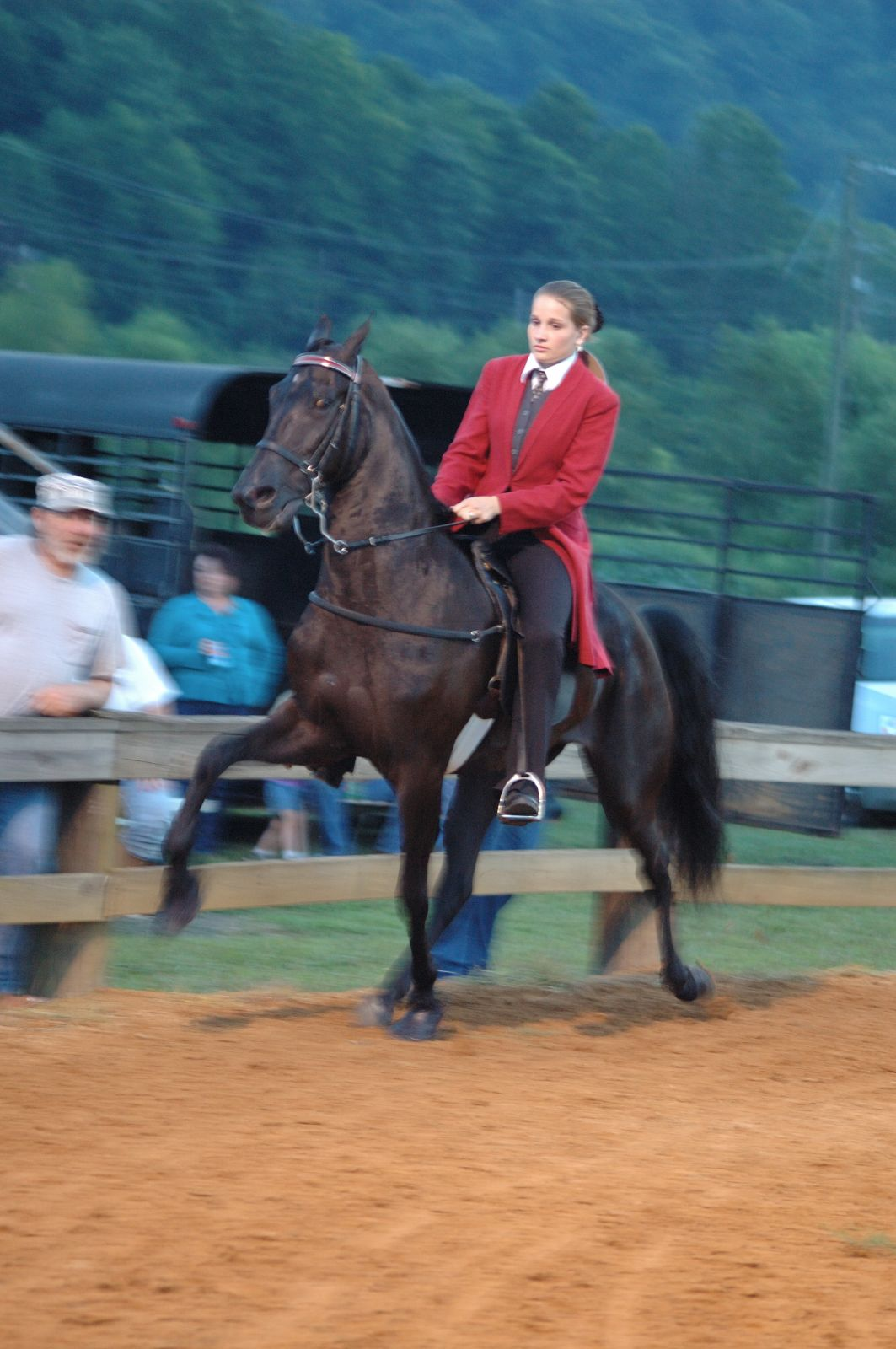
A Tennessee Walking Horse, one of the breeds most affected by the act

There have been a number of challenges to the Horse Protection Act on the grounds of constitutionality, mainly regarding due process and equal protection, none of which were successful. Courts have also ruled on other issues with regard to the act, including whether knowledge of soring or intent to sore is required in order to prove a violation of the act, and courts have repeatedly held that it is not. The issue of digital palpation, one of the main methods used by inspectors to find and verify soreness, has been contested in several courts, and is the only issue that has had courts come to varying conclusions on its legitimacy. The majority of courts with appeals rising to the Circuit Court level, have held that palpation is a legitimate method for identifying soreness, and that soreness found through palpation is grounds for penalties under the Horse Protection Act. However, in a decision promulgated by the Fifth Circuit Court, it was found that soreness found through digital palpation alone was not sufficient evidence upon which to base penalties.

The largest association in the United States for equine veterinarians, the American Association of Equine Practitioners (AAEP), called the practice of soring "one of the most significant welfare issues affecting any equine breed or discipline" after releasing a white paper on the subject in 2008. The organization pointed out that despite over three decades of work, the HPA law had failed to prevent sored horses from being trained, shown, and sold. The AAEP blamed this failure on what they called the "woefully inadequate" level of funding for enforcement, which the law caps at $500,000 annually. The federal Office of Inspector General found in 2010 that the self-enforcement system of HIOs and DQPs was inadequate for eliminating the practice of soring. This led to the June 2012 strengthening of penalty systems.

In 2010, the Friends of Sound Horses launched a website containing the names of the over 8,700 people who had received suspensions from the horse showing and training world under the Horse Protection Act between 1986 and 2010. This list was developed as part of the USDA Horse Protection Operating Plan for 2007–2009, and supported by most of the USDA-certified HIOs. Despite the work being done to dissuade trainers from soring horses, APHIS inspectors found hundreds of violations in the course of their work during the 2012 year.

=== Proposed amendments ===
Since the 1976 amendment, there have been several other proposed changes to the act, all unsuccessful so far. In 2005, HR 503, titled the "Horse Slaughter Prohibition Bill", was introduced by U.S. Representative John E. Sweeney (R-NY). The bill would have made major changes to the focus of the Horse Protection Act, by prohibiting the "shipping, transporting, moving, delivering, receiving, possessing, purchasing, selling, or donation of horses and other equines to be slaughtered for human consumption." It passed the House of Representatives in 2006, but died in the Senate.

In September 2012, U.S. Representatives Ed Whitfield, a Republican from Kentucky, and Steve Cohen, a Democrat from Tennessee, proposed HR 6388, titled the "Horse Protection Act Amendments of 2012". That bill died in committee. A similar bill, HR 1518, titled the "Prevent All Soring Tactics Act" was introduced on April 11, 2013. If passed, the bill, nearly identical to HR 6388, would amend the Horse Protection Act of 1970 to increase fines to $5,000, increase prison time to three years, and increase other penalties. It would also mandate the USDA to assign a licensed inspector if a show management indicates its intent to hire one, currently a voluntary practice. The bill would prohibit the use of "action devices" and "stacks". Action devices are weights attached around the pasterns of horses, and if attached so that they move, they can rub or irritate sored areas and thus further enhance gaits. Stacks are layers of pads attached to the bottom of the front hooves between the horseshoe and the hoof, which increase the lift of the foot and the impact with the ground by adding height and weight to horses' front feet. (Note: An Action device is defined in the Code of Federal Regulations and means "any boot, collar, chain, roller, or other device which encircles or is placed upon the lower extremity of the leg of a horse in such a manner that it can either rotate around the leg, or slide up and down the leg so as to cause friction, or which can strike the hoof, coronet band or fetlock joint." This definition would be added into the definitions section of the statute at 15 U.S.C. § 1821. Stacks would be defined under the proposed amendment as "(13) The use of a weighted shoe, pad, wedge, hoof band, or other device or material at a horse show, horse exhibition, or horse sale or auction that-- `(A) is placed on, inserted in, or attached to any limb of a Tennessee Walking, a Racking, or a Spotted Saddle horse;`(B) is constructed to artificially alter the gait of such a horse; and`(C) is not strictly protective or therapeutic in nature.') The final change would be to increase penalties for violations of the act. The bill was assigned to the House Committee on Energy and Commerce. Both bills have been opposed by some organizations within the Tennessee Walking Horse industry. The President and executive committee of the Tennessee Walking Horse Breeders' and Exhibitors' Association (TWHBEA) voted to support this legislation, but the full board of directors chose not to. The initial bill was supported by several outside organizations, including the AAEP, the American Veterinary Medical Association (AVMA) and the Humane Society of the United States (HSUS).

== See also ==
- Gingering
