= National Register of Historic Places listings in Bedford County, Tennessee =

List of historic places in Bedford county, TN

Location of Bedford County in Tennessee

This is a list of the National Register of Historic Places listings in Bedford County, Tennessee.

This is intended to be a complete list of the properties and districts on the National Register of Historic Places in Bedford County, Tennessee, United States. Latitude and longitude coordinates are provided for many National Register properties and districts; these locations may be seen together in a map.

There are 33 properties and districts listed on the National Register in the county. Two other properties were once listed, but have since been removed.

Contents: Counties in Tennessee
Anderson – Bedford – Benton – Bledsoe – Blount – Bradley – Campbell – Cannon – Carroll – Carter – Cheatham – Chester – Claiborne – Clay – Cocke – Coffee – Crockett – Cumberland – Davidson – Decatur – DeKalb – Dickson – Dyer – Fayette – Fentress – Franklin – Gibson – Giles – Grainger – Greene – Grundy – Hamblen – Hamilton – Hancock – Hardeman – Hardin – Hawkins – Haywood – Henderson – Henry – Hickman – Houston – Humphreys – Jackson – Jefferson – Johnson – Knox – Lake – Lauderdale – Lawrence – Lewis – Lincoln – Loudon – Macon – Madison – Marion – Marshall – Maury – McMinn – McNairy – Meigs – Monroe – Montgomery – Moore – Morgan – Obion – Overton – Perry – Pickett – Polk – Putnam – Rhea – Roane – Robertson – Rutherford – Scott – Sequatchie – Sevier – Shelby – Smith – Stewart – Sullivan – Sumner – Tipton – Trousdale – Unicoi – Union – Van Buren – Warren – Washington – Wayne – Weakley – White – Williamson – Wilson

This National Park Service list is complete through NPS recent listings posted August 7, 2026.

== Current listings ==
	Name on the Register	Image	Date listed	Location	City or town	Description
1	Bedford County Jail	Bedford County Jail	April 1, 1975 (#75001728)	N. Spring and Jackson Sts. 35°29′04″N 86°27′38″W	Shelbyville	
2	Bell Buckle Historic District	Bell Buckle Historic District	January 20, 1976 (#76001762)	Irregular pattern bounded roughly by Webb Rd., Abernathy, Maple, Cumberland, and Church Sts. 35°35′N 86°21′W	Bell Buckle	Includes commercial blocks along Main and Webb constructed in the 1890s
3	Brame-Reed House	Brame-Reed House	January 23, 1998 (#97001671)	1550 State Route 64, W. 35°27′21″N 86°32′39″W	Shelbyville	
4	Henry A. Clark House	Henry A. Clark House	August 30, 1985 (#85001899)	4615 TN-64; 35°32′32″N 86°19′44″W	Wartrace	
5	Gov. Prentice Cooper House	Gov. Prentice Cooper House	June 5, 1975 (#75001729)	413 E. Lane St. 35°29′06″N 86°27′12″W	Shelbyville	
6	Spencer Eakin Farm	Spencer Eakin Farm	June 24, 1993 (#93000564)	201 Nashville Dirt Rd. 35°30′32″N 86°28′16″W	Shelbyville	
7	East Shelbyville Historic District	East Shelbyville Historic District	April 23, 1990 (#90000594)	Bounded roughly by N. Brittian, former Louisville & Nashville railroad tracks, and Lane, Evans, Sandusky, and Madison Sts. 35°29′10″N 86°27′16″W	Shelbyville	
8	Winston Evans House	Winston Evans House	November 27, 1989 (#89002026)	306 E. Franklin St. 35°29′08″N 86°27′23″W	Shelbyville	
9	Farrar Homeplace	Farrar Homeplace	November 7, 1990 (#90001657)	170 Ike Farrar Rd. 35°21′37″N 86°23′24″W	Shelbyville	
10	First Presbyterian Church	First Presbyterian Church	July 17, 1980 (#80003780)	600 N. Brittain St. 35°29′10″N 86°27′29″W	Shelbyville	
11	Fly Manufacturing Company Building	Fly Manufacturing Company Building	March 7, 1996 (#96000226)	204 S. Main St. 35°28′53″N 86°27′42″W	Shelbyville	
12	Frierson-Coble House	Frierson-Coble House	April 12, 1982 (#82003951)	404 N. Jefferson St. 35°29′06″N 86°27′27″W	Shelbyville	
13	James Gilliland House	James Gilliland House	May 12, 1975 (#75001730)	803 Lipscomb St. 35°29′38″N 86°27′38″W	Shelbyville	
14	Grassland Farm	Grassland Farm	March 4, 1975 (#75001731)	8 miles southwest of Shelbyville on Snell Rd. 35°24′16″N 86°30′43″W	Shelbyville	
15	Heidt Tavern-Singleton House	Heidt Tavern-Singleton House	June 24, 1991 (#91000823)	119 Clyde Gleaves Rd. 35°33′58″N 86°16′55″W	Wartrace	
16	Jenkins Lutheran Chapel and Cemetery	Jenkins Lutheran Chapel and Cemetery	October 17, 1997 (#97001231)	364 Shofner Bridge Rd. 35°27′47″N 86°22′49″W	Shelbyville	
17	Absalom Lowe Landis House	Absalom Lowe Landis House	June 25, 1987 (#87001034)	Thompson's Creek Rd. 35°26′51″N 86°19′25″W	Normandy	
18	Maple Dean Farm		March 30, 1995 (#95000269)	400 New Herman Rd. 35°22′30″N 86°25′48″W	Shelbyville	
19	Martin House	Martin House	April 14, 1972 (#72001227)	7 miles northeast of Wartrace off State Route 64; 35°35′52″N 86°15′40″W	Wartrace	
20	Normandy Historic District	Normandy Historic District	November 7, 1985 (#85002786)	Roughly bounded by Maple and Poplar Sts., Tullahoma Rd., College St., and Old Manchester Rd. 35°27′06″N 86°15′34″W	Normandy	
21	Palmetto Farm	Palmetto Farm	March 28, 1985 (#85000675)	2935 Shelbyville Hwy. 35°29′28″N 86°39′49″W	Lewisburg	
22	Raus School	Raus School	November 21, 2012 (#12000966)	125 Smith Chapel Rd. 35°23′38″N 86°19′51″W	Raus vicinity	
23	River Side Farmhouse	River Side Farmhouse	December 1, 1997 (#97001501)	497 Shofner Rd. 35°26′58″N 86°22′53″W	Shelbyville	
24	Rosenwald Recreation and Community Center	Rosenwald Recreation and Community Center	November 21, 2024 (#100011067)	516 Tillman St. 35°29′31″N 86°27′54″W	Shelbyville	
25	Shelbyville Courthouse Square Historic District	Shelbyville Courthouse Square Historic District	October 27, 1982 (#82001725)	Public Square (Main, Spring, Depot, and Holland Sts.); 35°28′57″N 86°27′37″W	Shelbyville	
26	Shelbyville Hydroelectric Station	Shelbyville Hydroelectric Station	February 9, 1990 (#89002354)	State Route 231 at the Duck River; 35°29′08″N 86°28′01″W	Shelbyville	
27	Shelbyville Railroad Station	Shelbyville Railroad Station	March 24, 1988 (#88000265)	Depot St. 35°28′55″N 86°27′24″W	Shelbyville	
28	Shofners' Lutheran Church and Cemetery	Shofners' Lutheran Church and Cemetery	July 10, 1998 (#97001232)	2896 US-41A; 35°26′48″N 86°19′46″W	Wartrace	
29	John Green Sims House	John Green Sims House	November 5, 1987 (#87001937)	620 Knobs Creek Rd. 35°31′20″N 86°19′17″W	Wartrace	
30	Thompson Creek Rural Historic District	Thompson Creek Rural Historic District	May 8, 2019 (#100003898)	Along sections of US 41-A, Normandy, Cathey, Thompson Creek & Shofner Rds., Hornaday Ln. & Three Forks Bridge; 35°26′52″N 86°19′39″W	Wartrace	
31	Valley Home	Valley Home	November 13, 1989 (#89001956)	310 Potts Rd. 35°31′49″N 86°18′47″W	Wartrace	
32	Walking Horse Hotel	Walking Horse Hotel	July 19, 1984 (#84003262)	Spring St. 35°31′38″N 86°20′04″W	Wartrace	Built in 1917; still operates as a hotel.
33	Wartrace Historic District	Wartrace Historic District	July 31, 1991 (#91000914)	Roughly Spring St. from Coffey to Main Sts., Vine St. from Broad to McKinley Sts. and Knob Creek Rd. from Main to McKinley; 35°31′39″N 86°20′01″W	Wartrace	

== Former listings ==
	Name on the Register	Image	Date listed	Date removed	Location	City or town	Description
1	Bivvins House		December 6, 1979 (#79002413)	March 10, 2009	Off U.S. Route 41; 35°30′07″N 86°28′18″W	Shelbyville	Destroyed by fire.
2	Webb School, Junior Room		April 1, 1973 (#73001751)	October 20, 1987	Off TN 82; 35°35′18″N 86°20′54″W	Bell Buckle	Delisted after being relocated to another location on the campus of The Webb School.

== See also ==
- List of National Historic Landmarks in Tennessee
- National Register of Historic Places listings in Tennessee
