= National Register of Historic Places listings in Putnam County, Georgia =

This is a list of properties and districts in Putnam County, Georgia that are listed on the National Register of Historic Places (NRHP).

This National Park Service list is complete through NPS recent listings posted March 21, 2025.

== Current listings ==
| | Name on the Register | Image | Date listed | Location | City or town | Description |
|---|---|---|---|---|---|---|
| 1 | Eatonton Historic District | Eatonton Historic District | June 13, 1975 (#75000605) | Most of town centered around courthouse and city hall 33°19′50″N 83°23′17″W | Eatonton | |
| 2 | Gatewood House | | June 20, 1975 (#75000606) | 6 mi. NE of Eatonton off GA 44; 33°23′41″N 83°18′02″W | Eatonton | |
| 3 | Rock Eagle Site | Rock Eagle Site | May 23, 1978 (#78001001) | Address Restricted; 33°25′03″N 83°23′17″W | Eatonton | Rock Eagle Effigy Mound, 1000–3000 years old, viewable from an observation tower |
| 4 | Rockville Academy and St. Paul Methodist Church Historic District | Rockville Academy and St. Paul Methodist Church Historic District | November 19, 2002 (#02001382) | E of Eatonton and S of GA 16, Rockville Rd. 33°19′32″N 83°13′08″W | Eatonton | |
| 5 | Singleton House | | October 1, 1974 (#74000701) | SW of Eatonton off GA 16; 33°18′03″N 83°29′50″W | Eatonton | |
| 6 | Strong-Davis-Rice-George House | | November 8, 2006 (#06000987) | 107 Hudson Rd. 33°19′41″N 83°24′00″W | Eatonton | |
| 7 | Terrell-Sadler House | Terrell-Sadler House | March 31, 2000 (#00000303) | 122 Harmony Rd. 33°25′52″N 83°22′14″W | Harmony | |
| 8 | Tompkins Inn | Tompkins Inn | October 5, 1978 (#78001002) | N of Eatonton on U.S. 441; 33°26′11″N 83°22′40″W | Eatonton | |
| 9 | Turnwold | | March 10, 1980 (#80001225) | SE of Eatonton on Old Phoenix Rd. 33°22′43″N 83°16′29″W | Eatonton | |
| 10 | Woodland | | January 29, 1979 (#79000741) | NE of Eatonton at 750 Harmony Rd. 33°26′34″N 83°17′11″W | Eatonton | |
