= Farrar House =

Farrar House may refer to:

in the United States (by state then city)

- Samuel Farrar House, Bangor, Maine, listed on the National Register of Historic Places (NRHP) in Penobscot County
- Obediah Farrar House, Haywood, North Carolina, listed on the NRHP in Lee County
- Farrar House (Hurley, South Dakota), listed on the NRHP in Turner County
- Capt. H. P. Farrar House, Jackson, Tennessee, listed on the NRHP in Madison County
- Farrar Homeplace, Shelbyville, Tennessee, listed on the NRHP in Bedford County
- Farrar House (Ennis, Texas), listed on the NRHP in Ellis County
- Roy and Margaret Farrar House, Houston, Texas, listed on the NRHP in Harris County
