= Sadler House =

Sadler House may refer to:

in the United States (by state then city)

- Sadler House (McCalla, Alabama), listed on the National Register of Historic Places (NRHP) in Jefferson County
- Terrell-Sadler House, Harmony, Georgia, listed on the NRHP in Putnam County
- Herbert A. Sadler House, Attleboro, Massachusetts, listed on the NRHP in Bristol County
- Sadler House (Aberdeen, Mississippi), listed on the NRHP in Monroe County
- Gov. Reinhold Sadler House, Carson City, Nevada, listed on the NRHP in Carson City
- Sadler House (Montclair, New Jersey), listed on the NRHP in Essex County, New Jersey
- Samuel Sadler House, Sandy Creek, New York, listed on the NRHP in Oswego County
