= Brame (disambiguation) =

The Brame is a river in France.

Brame may also refer to:

== People ==
=== Surname ===
- Benjamin Brame (1772–1851), first mayor of Ipswich
- Charlotte Mary Brame (1836–1884), English novelist
- Erv Brame (1901-1949), pitcher for the Pittsburgh Pirates
- Geneviève Brame, French writer
- Gloria Brame (born 1955), American sexologist
- Michael Brame (1944—2010), American linguist

=== Given name ===
- Brame Hillyard (1876–1959), British tennis player

== Other uses ==
- Brame House, an historic Classical Revival-style house in Montgomery, Alabama
- Brame & Lorenceau Gallery, an art gallery in Paris
- Brame-Reed House, an historic house in Shelbyville, Tennessee
