= Singleton House =

Singleton House may refer to:

in the United States

(by state)

- Singleton House (Eatonton, Georgia), listed on the National Register of Historic Places (NRHP) in Georgia
- Singleton-Lathem-Large House, Chesterfield, New Jersey, listed on the NRHP in New Jersey
- Heidt Tavern-Singleton House, Wartrace, Tennessee, listed on the NRHP in Tennessee
- Capt. William E. Singleton House, Jefferson, Texas, listed on the NRHP in Texas
- Samuel Singleton House, Ferron, Utah, listed on the NRHP in Utah
