= Grassland (disambiguation) =

A grassland is a vegetation and landscape type.

Grassland or Grasslands may also refer to:

== Places ==
=== Canada ===
- Grassland, Alberta, hamlet in northern Alberta
- Municipality of Grassland, Manitoba
- Grasslands National Park, one of Canada's newer national parks
- Cypress Hills—Grasslands, a federal electoral district in Saskatchewan, Canada

=== South Africa ===
- Grasslands, Bloemfontein, a suburb of Bloemfontein

=== United States ===
- Grassland (Annapolis Junction, Maryland), listed on the National Register of Historic Places in Maryland
- Grassland, Texas, an unincorporated community in Lynn County, West Texas
- Grassland Farm, listed on the National Register of Historic Places in Bedford County, Tennessee
- Grassland station, or simply Grassland, an abandoned train station in Haverford Township, Pennsylvania
- Grasslands (Finchville, Kentucky), listed on the NRHP in Shelby County, Kentucky

== Other ==
- Grassland (film), a 2022 Iranian drama film
- "Grasslands" (Planet Earth II), a 2016 television episode
- Grassland FC, a professional football club in Bamenda, Cameroon
