= Valley Home =

Historic house in Tennessee, United States

- U.S. National Register of Historic Places
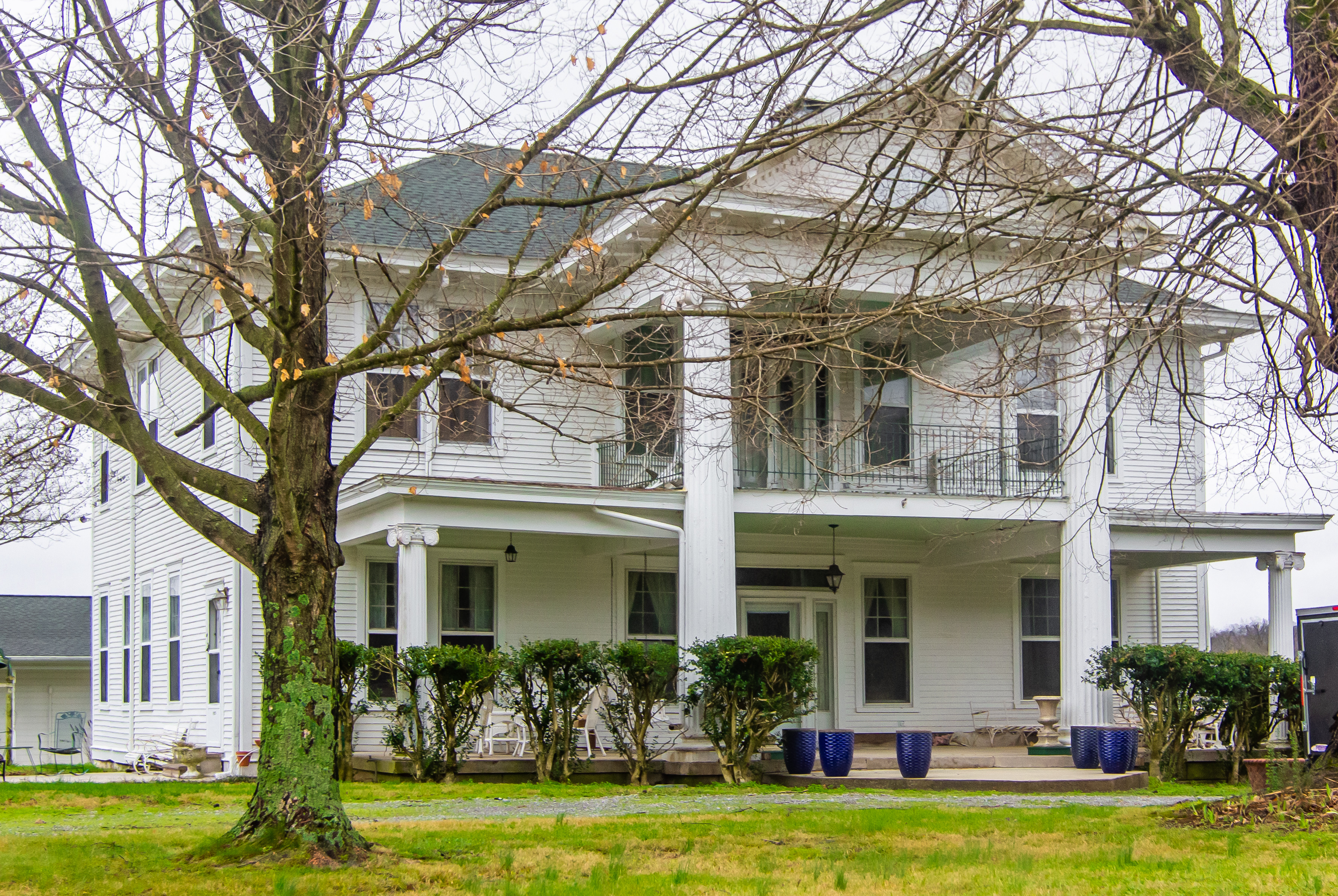

- Location within Tennessee Location within the United States
- Location: 310 Potts Rd.
- Nearest city: Wartrace, Tennessee
- Coordinates: 35°31′49″N 86°18′47″W
- Area: 1 acre (0.40 ha)
- Built: 1835
- Architectural style: Classical Revival, Greek Revival
- NRHP reference No.: 89001956
- Added to NRHP: November 13, 1989

Valley Home is a historic mansion in Wartrace, Tennessee, U.S..

== History ==
The house was built for Jeremiah Cleveland, a farmer from North Carolina, circa 1835. Cleveland lived here with his first wife, Sarah Elizabeth Stone, and their three children; he became widowed and married her sister, Mary S. Stone, with whom he had three more children. Professionally, Cleveland helped expand the Nashville, Chattanooga and St. Louis Railway; he was also the owner of 50 slaves by the 1850s. The Clevelands owned the house throughout the American Civil War and the Reconstruction Era, only to sell it to Dr John Lane Walker in 1908.

== Architectural significance ==
The house was first designed in the Greek Revival architectural style. By 1908–1910, Classical Revival features were added to the house. It has been listed on the National Register of Historic Places since November 13, 1989.
