= John Green Sims House =

Historic house in Tennessee, United States

- U.S. National Register of Historic Places
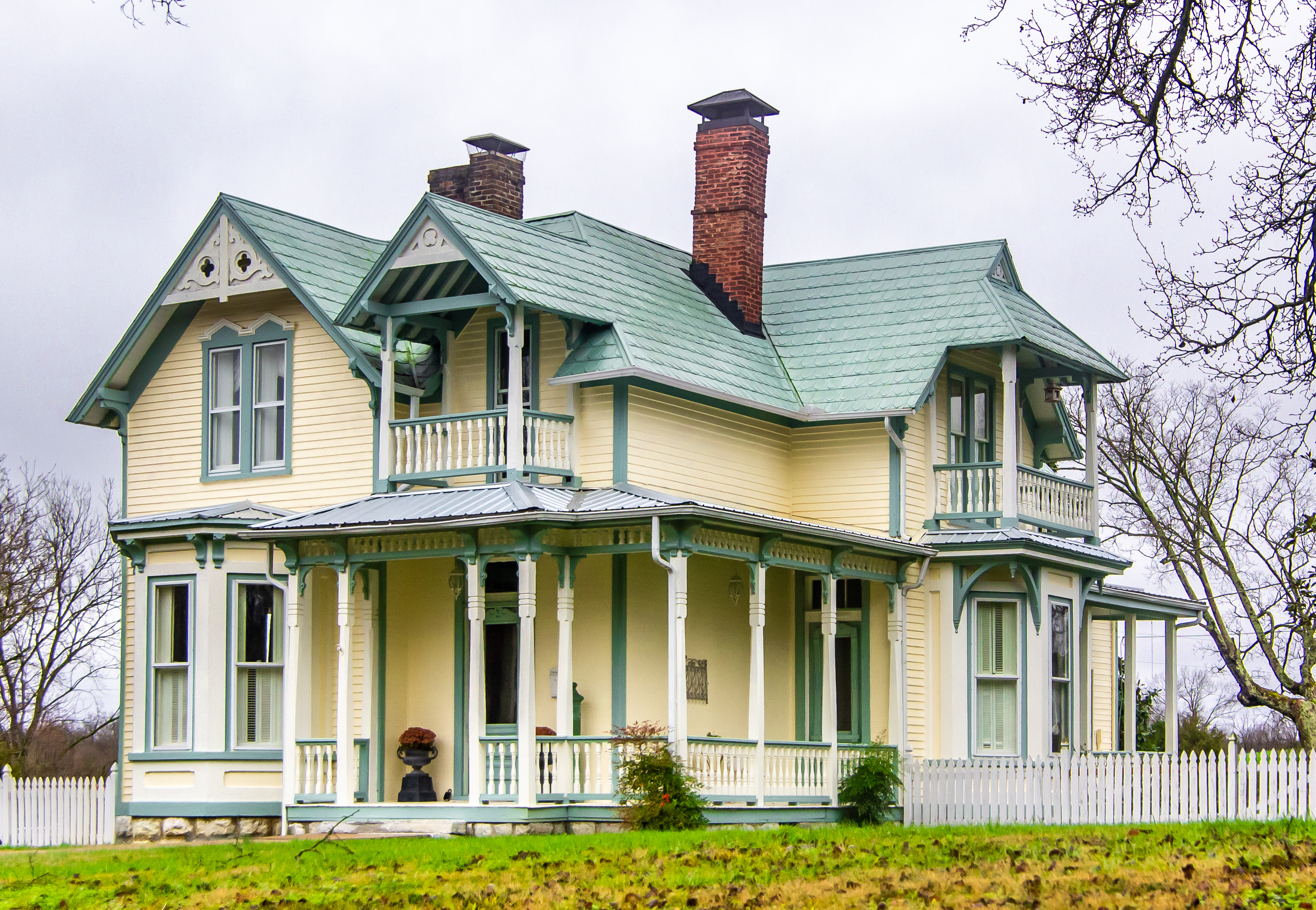

- Location within Tennessee Location within the United States
- Location: 620 Knob Creek Rd.
- Nearest city: Wartrace, Tennessee
- Coordinates: 35°31′20″N 86°19′17″W
- Area: 3.7 acres (1.5 ha)
- Built: 1884
- Architectural style: Stick/eastlake, Queen Anne
- NRHP reference No.: 87001937
- Added to NRHP: November 5, 1987

The John Green Sims House is a historic house in Wartrace, Tennessee, U.S..

== History ==
The land belonged to Jerry Cleveland Sims. In 1884, Jerry's son, John Green Sims, and his wife Mary Wright, built this house on the land. It was inherited by their son, Lucius B. Sims, in 1944, who sold in 1965. In 1965 it was purchased by Donald Floyd. Around 1969, Donald Floyd sold property to his father, Woodrow Floyd. In 1984, it was purchased by Kevin P. Wright. It is now owned by Tracey L. DeWire, purchased in Feb, 2019.

== Architectural significance ==
The house was designed in the Queen Anne architectural style, "with Eastlake detailing." It has been listed on the National Register of Historic Places since November 5, 1987.
