= Martin House (Wartrace, Tennessee) =

Historic house in Tennessee, United States

- U.S. National Register of Historic Places
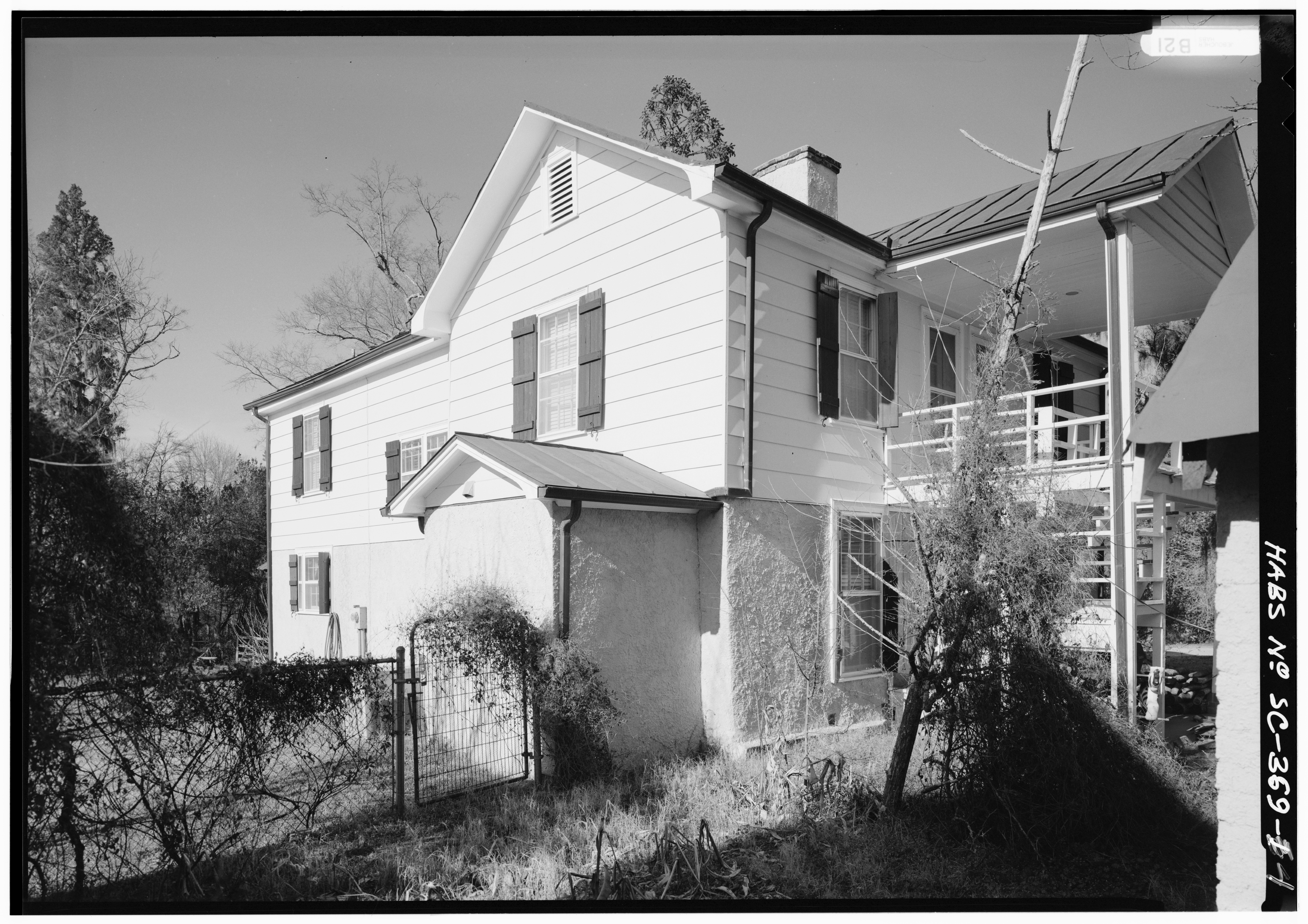

- Location within Tennessee Location within the United States
- Nearest city: Wartrace, Tennessee
- Coordinates: 35°35′52″N 86°15′40″W
- Area: 8 acres (3.2 ha)
- Built: 1809
- Architectural style: Federal
- NRHP reference No.: 72001227
- Added to NRHP: April 14, 1972

The Martin House is a historic mansion in Wartrace, Tennessee, U.S..

== History ==
The house was built in 1809 for Barclay and Matthew Martins, two brothers from South Carolina who had served in the American Revolutionary War. They lived here with their wives, both cousins of Henry Clay. Matthew Martin and his wife Sally had 13 children; their son Matt served as a colonel in the Confederate States Army during the American Civil War.

== Architectural significance ==
The house was designed in the Federal architectural style. It has been listed on the National Register of Historic Places since April 14, 1972.
