= Henry A. Clark House =

- U.S. National Register of Historic Places
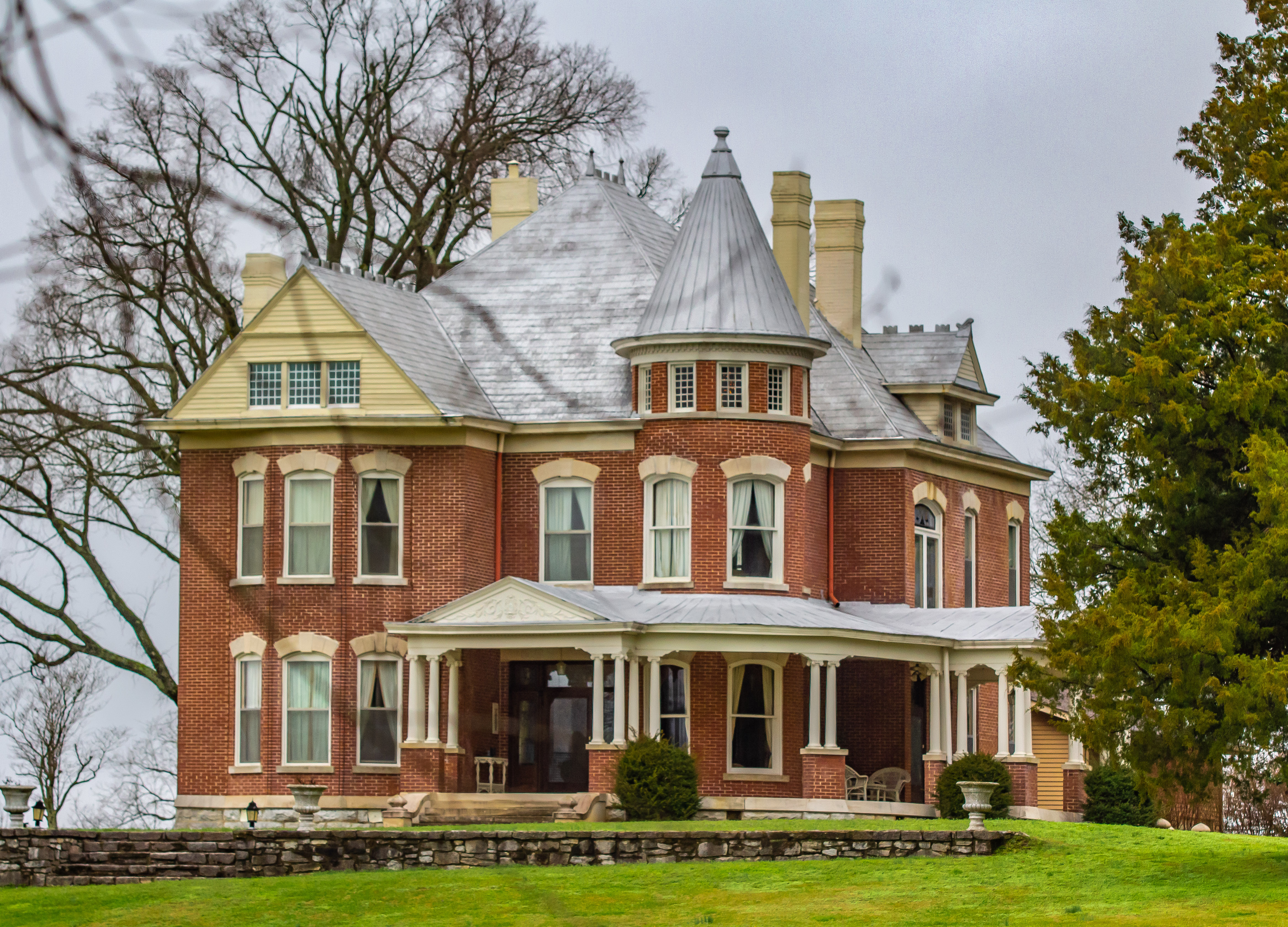

- Location within Tennessee
- Location: 4615 TN-64
- Nearest city: Wartrace, Tennessee
- Coordinates: 35°32′32″N 86°19′44″W
- Area: 5 acres (2.0 ha)
- Built: 1902
- Architectural style: Queen Anne
- NRHP reference No.: 85001899
- Added to NRHP: August 30, 1985

The Henry A. Clark House, also known as The Castle, is a historic house in Wartrace, Tennessee, United States. It was built in 1902 for Henry A. Clark and his wife, Lizzie Cunningham.

The house was designed in the Queen Anne architectural style, with a turret. It has been listed on the National Register of Historic Places since August 30, 1985.
