= Winston Evans House =

Historic house in Tennessee, United States

- U.S. National Register of Historic Places
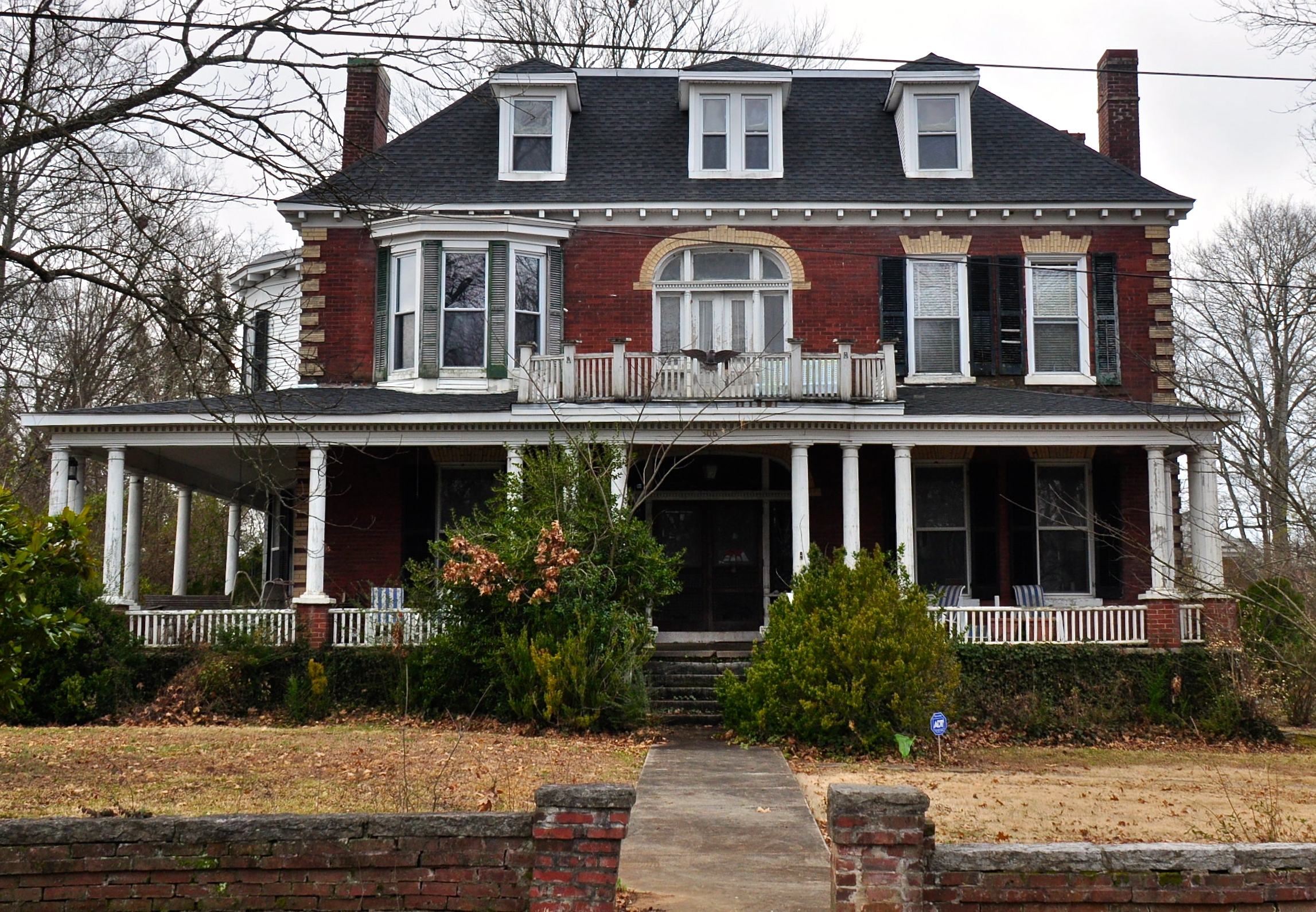
- The Winston Evans House in 2014

- Location within Tennessee Location within the United States
- Location: 306 East Franklin Street, Shelbyville, Tennessee
- Coordinates: 35°29′8″N 86°27′23″W
- Area: 2 acres (0.81 ha)
- Built: 1900
- Architectural style: Classical Revival
- NRHP reference No.: 89002026
- Added to NRHP: November 27, 1989

Winston Evans House is a historic house in Shelbyville, Tennessee, U.S.. The two-story house was built in 1900 for Winston Evans and his wife Carrie Frierson, whose family owned the land and built the Frierson-Coble House nearby. It was designed in the Classical Revival architectural style. It has been listed on the National Register of Historic Places since November 27, 1989.
