= Shofner =

Shofner is the surname of the following people:

- Austin Shofner (1916–1999), United States Marine Corps officer
- Calvin Grant Shofner (1932–2013), American country singer who performed and recorded under the name Cal Smith
- Del Shofner (1934-2020), American football wide receiver
- Jim Shofner (1935–2021), American football player and coach
- Joanne Shofner, American politician
- Strick Shofner (1919–1998), American major league baseball player

== See also ==
- Shofner's Lutheran Chapel near Shelbyville, Tennessee, U.S.
