= Walking Horse and Eastern Railroad =

Railroad in Tennessee, United States

Overview
- Headquarters: Shelbyville, Tennessee
- Reporting mark: WHOE
- Locale: Tennessee
- Dates of operation: 1985–

Technical
- Track gauge: 4 ft 8 1/2 in (1,435 mm) standard gauge

The Walking Horse and Eastern Railroad (reporting mark WHOE) was a 7.76-mile (12.49 km) short-line railroad that connects Shelbyville to CSX Transportation at Wartrace, Tennessee, United States. It operates over a branch line completed in 1853 by the Nashville and Chattanooga Railroad, a Louisville and Nashville Railroad predecessor. After the Seaboard System Railroad abandoned the line in May 1985, the Bedford Railroad Authority (of Bedford County) bought the line and designated the WHOE to operate it. In 2019, Walking Horse Railroad, LLC (owned by Ironhorse Resources, Inc.) acquired the operating rights of this branch line.
