= Heidt Tavern-Singleton House =

- Heidt Tavern--Singleton House
- U.S. National Register of Historic Places
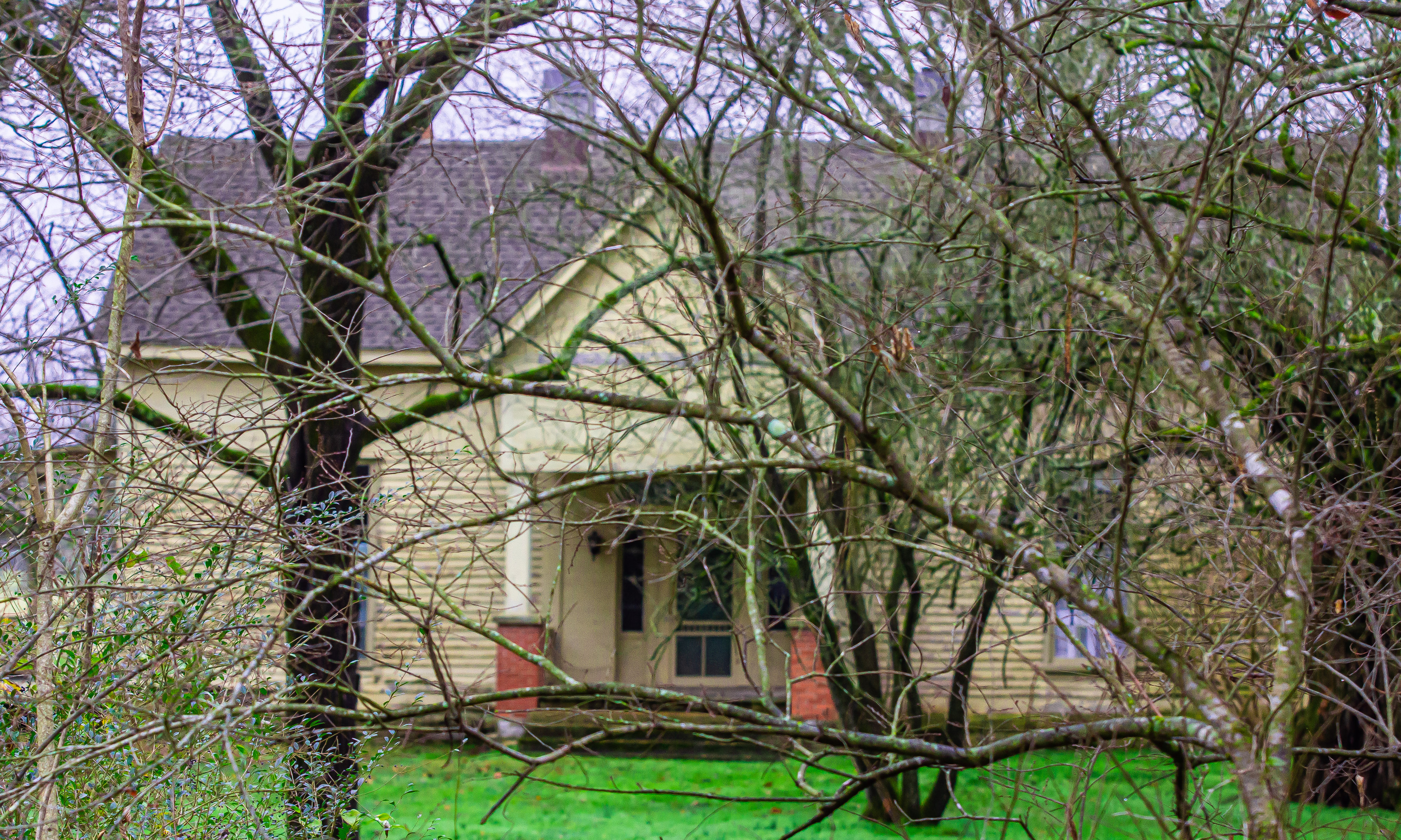

- Location within Tennessee Location within the United States
- Location: 119 Clyde Gleaves Rd.
- Nearest city: Wartrace, Tennessee
- Coordinates: 35°33′58″N 86°16′55″W
- Area: 2.5 acres (1.0 ha)
- Built: 1790
- Architectural style: Greek Revival, Federal
- NRHP reference No.: 91000823
- Added to NRHP: June 24, 1991

The Heidt Tavern-Singleton House is a historic house in Wartrace, Tennessee, U.S.. It was built as a tavern run by Mr Heidt in 1790. In the early 1840s, it was purchased by Dr Robert L. Singleton, who expanded it into a house by the 1850s. The house was designed in the Federal and Greek Revival architectural styles. It has been listed on the National Register of Historic Places since July 24, 1991.
