= Maple Dean Farm =

Historic house in Tennessee, United States

- U.S. National Register of Historic Places
- U.S. Historic district
- Location within Tennessee Location within the United States
- Nearest city: Shelbyville, Tennessee
- Coordinates: 35°22′30″N 86°25′48″W
- Area: 209 acres (85 ha)
- Built: 1886
- Architectural style: Stick/eastlake, Gable-Front and Wing
- MPS: Historic Family Farms in Middle Tennessee MPS
- NRHP reference No.: 95000269
- Added to NRHP: March 30, 1995

The Maple Dean Farm is a historic farmhouse in Shelbyville, Tennessee, U.S.. Built in 1886 on a farm established in 1819, it was designed in the Eastlake architectural style. It became a century farm in 1976, and it was listed on the National Register of Historic Places in 1976.

== History ==
Thomas Dean, a farmer from South Carolina, moved to Bedford County and established the farm in 1819. He lived here with his wife, Cassandra Brewton, and their son, Peyton S. Dean. Professionally, Dean became a local Democratic politician, serving in the Tennessee House of Representatives from 1835 to 1839 and 1851 to 1853 as well as in the Tennessee Senate from 1847 to 1849 and 1855 to 1857. He was also a slaveholder. At the outset of the American Civil War, "he owned over a hundred [slaves]".

Thomas Dean died in 1881, and the farm was inherited by his son Peyton. Peyton, his wife and daughter Elizabeth lived in a great mansion on the farm designed in the Greek Revival architectural style. The house was later demolished. In 1885, Peyton's daughter acquired the farm, where she lived with her husband, Thomas Crigler, a schoolteacher. A year later, they hired Jere Baxter to build a new farmhouse. They hired painter Fred Swanton to do the wallpapers inside the house. Swanton started his career as a circus painter and subsequently painted many wallpapers in Middle Tennessee; he specialized in painting naturalistic scenes of landscapes.

The farmhouse was inherited by the Criglers's son, John Peyton Crigler, in 1911. Crigler built more outbuildings on the farm and continued to raise cattle. In 1958, Jacob Crigler acquired the house, and he turned the property into a tobacco farm. In 1976, it was "certified as a Tennessee Century Farm by the Tennessee Department of Agriculture." The farm still belonged to the Dean/Crigler family by the 1990s.

== Architectural significance ==
The farmhouse was designed in the Eastlake architectural style. has been listed on the National Register of Historic Places since March 30, 1995.
