= Spencer Eakin Farm =

Historic house in Tennessee, United States

- U.S. National Register of Historic Places
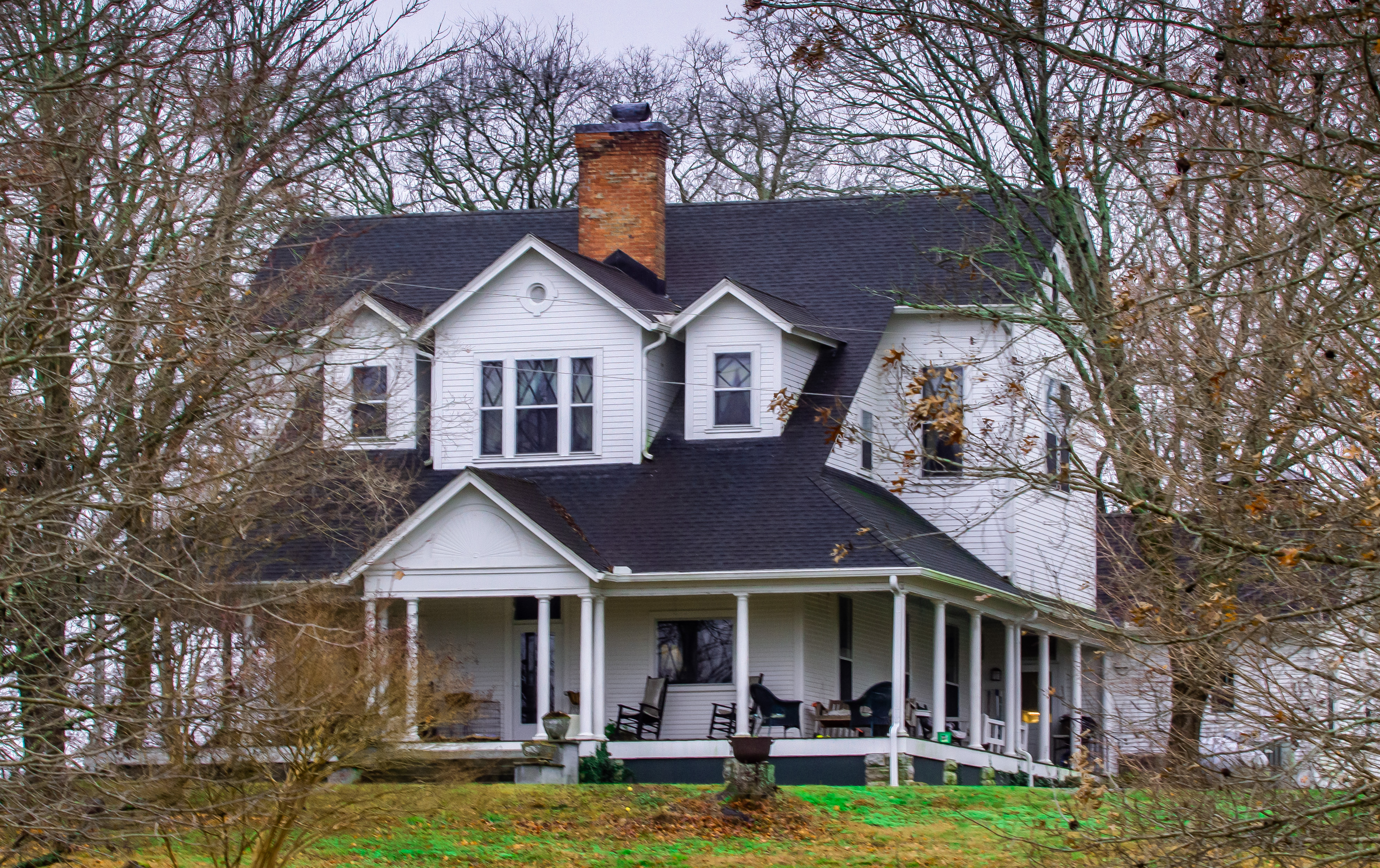

- Location within Tennessee Location within the United States
- Location: 201 Nashville Dirt Road, Shelbyville, Tennessee
- Coordinates: 35°30′32″N 86°28′16″W
- Area: 113 acres (46 ha)
- Built: 1842, 1903
- Built by: Multiple
- Architectural style: Classical Revival, Bungalow/craftsman, Queen Anne
- NRHP reference No.: 93000564
- Added to NRHP: June 24, 1993

Spencer Eakin Farm, also known as Springhill Farm, is a farm in Shelbyville, Tennessee listed on the National Register of Historic Places in 1993. It is also a Century Farm, meaning that it has been owned by the same family for over 100 years.

== History ==
Spencer Eakin Farm was founded by the Eakin family in 1842. The farm contains 6 buildings and one structure in classical revival, Queen Anne, and American movement styles of architecture.

== Modern day ==
Spencer Eakin Farm is still privately owned by the Eakin family. In 2014, it received the Century Farm designation, marking it as a farm owned by the same family for 100 consecutive years.
