= Brame-Reed House =

Historic house in Tennessee, United States

- Brame--Reed House
- U.S. National Register of Historic Places
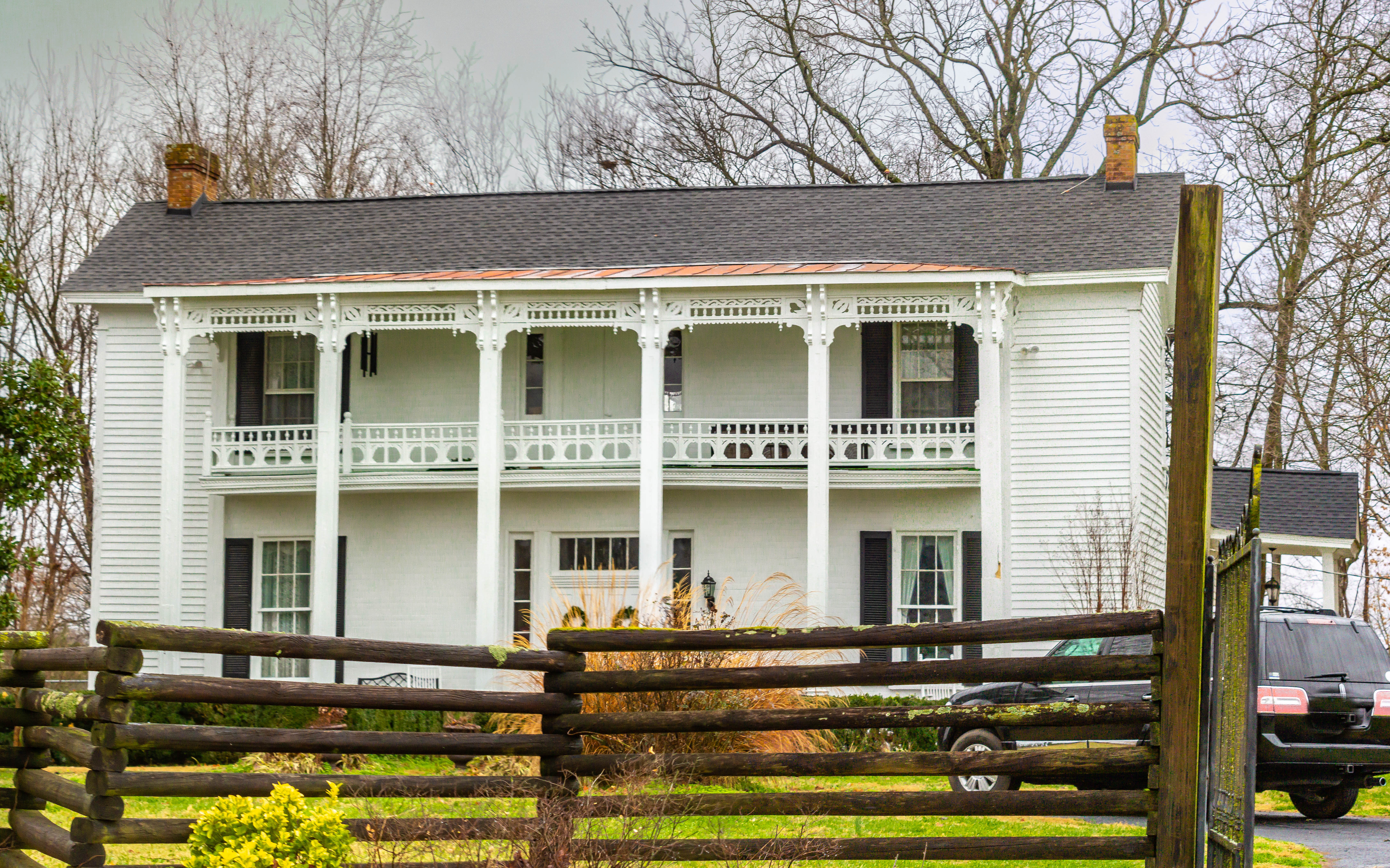

- Location within Tennessee Location within the United States
- Location: 1550 TN-64
- Nearest city: Shelbyville, Tennessee
- Coordinates: 35°27′21″N 86°32′39″W
- Area: 1 acre (0.40 ha)
- Architectural style: Italianate I-house
- NRHP reference No.: 97001671
- Added to NRHP: January 23, 1998

The Brame-Reed House is a historic house in Shelbyville, Tennessee, United States. It was built circa 1840 for Melchisedec Brame, a farmer from Virginia who owned 9 slaves. Brame died in 1845, and in 1850 a portico designed in the Greek Revival architectural style was added by his heir, William B. M. Brame. Shortly after, the house was purchased by L. C. Reed. By the 1870s, it was purchased by John Cotner, and it remained in the Cotner-Wood family until the 1980s. It has been listed on the National Register of Historic Places since January 23, 1998.
