= Grassland Farm =

Historic house in Tennessee, United States

- U.S. National Register of Historic Places
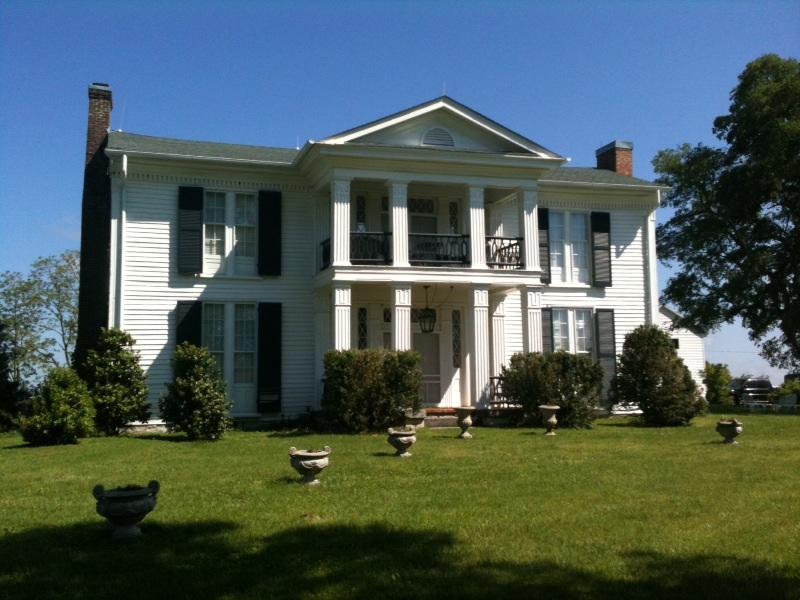

- Location within Tennessee Location within the United States
- Nearest city: Shelbyville, Tennessee
- Coordinates: 35°24′16″N 86°30′43″W
- Area: 71 acres (29 ha)
- Built: 1810
- Architectural style: Greek Revival, Federal
- NRHP reference No.: 75001731
- Added to NRHP: March 4, 1975

Grassland Farm is a historic gem of the antebellum style of architecture typical of the southern states of that time, in Shelbyville, Tennessee, U.S.. It was built on land donated by the then-new state of North Carolina, in the Federal style of the early 1800s (1810–1815), by Alexander Grier, a war hero who had served in the American Revolutionary War. A portico, designed in the Greek Revival architectural style, was added shortly thereafter, along with a great room connecting the formerly outside kitchen. It has been listed on the National Register of Historic Places since March 4, 1975. It is noted for its extraordinary architecture and sprawling 71 acres of gently rolling hills. Several of its mantels are considered some of the very best of their genre. The original size of the plantation was 5000 acres. Included on the property are period outbuildings and a breathtaking antique barn. Today, the residence is considered among the area's most beautiful and privately owned.

When Alexander Grier built the house, it stood on a pasture grant conveyed by North Carolina in 1788, by land grant number 40. The purchase price was $45 per 100 acres. Concession to modernization was the attachment of the two-room brick cook-house to the main house. Extreme effort was made to match new to old and to use antique materials whenever possible and available. The result is that its evident age has been preserved. The house is on the National Historic Registry and registered with Tennessee's Historical Commission, which only did so after extensive inspection. Although the builder is not known, it is evident that it was the product of a master builder and predated President Andrew Jackson's famed Hermitage. In over 200 years, no one has damaged the home or altered the excellent Federal style.

Three previous owners fought for the Confederacy: Leroy Barrett, James Newton and Riggs Dixon. It was also the last home of a Revolutionary War soldier; Grier fought at King's Mountain. Rutherford County records confirm that Grier visited the site to make his "real" home in 1804. A former resident of Carter County, where he served as Lieutenant Colonel in the militia, in the Territory South of the Ohio River, under Colonel James Robinson of Nashborough fame. Grier came to Beford County when he was 52, and immediately became active in county affairs.
