= Gatewood House (Eatonton, Georgia) =

Historic house in Georgia, United States

- U.S. National Register of Historic Places
- Location within Georgia Location within the United States
- Nearest city: Eatonton, Georgia
- Coordinates: 33°23′41″N 83°18′2″W
- Built: c. 1805-1812
- Built by: John Keating
- Architectural style: Plain Style
- NRHP reference No.: 75000606
- Added to NRHP: June 20, 1975

Gatewood House is a historic plantation house in Eatonton, Georgia, that is listed on the U.S. National Register of Historic Places. It was built sometime during 1805–1812 while the property was owned by a John Keating. Keating acquired the property through Georgia's 1805 land lottery, drawing a 202.5-acre tract that included part of Lick Creek, and built the house there before selling the property in 1812. As of 1975, the house remained unaltered from its original construction. It is significant for its "refined yet simple" architecture, unusual and hence more important given its era.

Owners include:

- pre-1812 John Keating built it, sold it for $1200 to James O'Neal
- James O'Neal made the property into a successful cotton plantation, sold it for $1900 in 1820
- Z. Weddington, sold it for $1400
- William Walker owned it
- James Jackson sold the house and its 202.5 acres (81.9 ha) for $1200 to Mrs. Francis M. Gatewood
- Mrs. Francis M. Gatewood, whose family kept it into the 1920s
- U.S. government purchased it
- H. Grady West purchased it with 130 acres (53 ha) in 1930s
- Mr. and Mrs. John Copeland, owners in 1975, purchased it not long before then

Reportedly the hand of Ann E. Gatewood was sought by William H. Seward (later U.S. Secretary of State).

Turnwold Plantation, where Joel Chandler Harris lived and wrote, is nearby.

It was listed on the National Register of Historic Places in 1975.
