= Samuel Farrar House =

Historic house in Maine, United States

- U.S. National Register of Historic Places
- Location within Maine Location within the United States
- Location: 117 Court St., Bangor, Maine
- Coordinates: 44.8042°N 68.7774°W
- Area: 1 acre (0.40 ha)
- Built: 1836
- Architect: Richard Upjohn; Rogers, Isaiah
- Architectural style: Greek Revival
- NRHP reference No.: 74000186
- Added to NRHP: May 23, 1974

The Samuel Farrar House is a historic house at 117 Court Street in Bangor, Maine. Built in 1836 for one of the city's leading businessmen, it is an important early work of American architect Richard Upjohn. It is one of Maine's finest examples of residential Greek Revival architecture, with a four-column temple front. It was listed on the National Register of Historic Places in 1974. It is now part of an affordable housing complex known as Kenduskeag Terrace.

== Description and history ==
The Farrar House is located northwest of downtown Bangor, set on the north side of Court Street just east of Coe Park, overlooking Kenduskeag Stream. It is a 2 1/2-story structure, with a front-facing gable roof, brick walls, and a granite foundation. Its street-facing facade has a massive and elaborate Greek temple treatment, with four two-story fluted Doric columns supporting an ornately carved entablature and fully pedimented gable with a triangular carved panel at its center. The front wall behind the colonnade has three bays articulated by brick pilasters, with the entrance in the center bay. The rear (stream-facing) facade originally had a similar temple front. To the left of the main block stands a recessed brick addition, with stylistically similar elements. An enclosed porch stands at the corner joining the two parts. A modern hyphen joins the building at its rear to a modern two-story flat-roofed apartment complex.

The house was built in 1836 for Samuel Farrar, who was for many years one of Bangor's leading lumbermen, also working as a banker and municipal judge. The house is an early design of Richard Upjohn, and is one of three prominent Greek Revival buildings he designed in Bangor. The addition on the left side of the house, made in 1846, was designed by Isaiah Rogers.

== See also ==
- Grand Army Memorial Home, an Upjohn design
- Isaac Farrar Mansion, an Upjohn design for Samuel Farrar's brother Isaac
- National Register of Historic Places listings in Penobscot County, Maine
