= Geneviève Brame =

French author

Geneviève Brame is a French author who writes in Paris and Normandy. She lives with her husband in the former residence of the Comtesse de Ségur.

== Biography ==
She is the author of the "Living & Working in France" books published by Kogan Page and "Chez Vous en France" published by La Documentation française.

Her children's book series "Pays d’enfance" includes the titles Chez toi en France under the Hachette Jeunesse imprint, as well as Chez toi en Europe and Chez toi en Normandie among others. She is also the creator of the francophile site AsapFrance.info in conjunction with the Diplomatic missions of France and the French embassies in Brussels, London and The Hague.

In 2003 she received an Ordre national du Mérite, which is an Order of State awarded by the President of the French Republic.
