= Turnwold =

- U.S. National Register of Historic Places
- Location within Georgia Location within the United States
- Nearest city: Eatonton, Georgia
- Coordinates: 33°22′43″N 83°16′29″W
- Area: 110 acres (45 ha)
- Built: c.1860
- Architectural style: Greek Revival, Federal, Plantation Plain
- NRHP reference No.: 80001225
- Added to NRHP: March 10, 1980

Turnwold, located near Eatonton, Georgia, was built in 1860. It was listed on the National Register of Historic Places in 1980. The property then included five contributing buildings and three contributing sites.

It is located northeast of Eatonton on Old Phoenix Rd.

It includes two historic plantation houses. Also included are a detached kitchen, a mid-nineteenth-century academy, and a late nineteenth-century tenant house. The sites are two family cemeteries associated with the plantation houses, and the site of a printing shop.

The oldest of the two houses is the Alexander-Turner House, a Plantation Plain-style house built on a slight rise of ground. It is two-stories tall, with a one-story ell to the rear.

The other is the Lane-Turner House, a Federal-style two-over-two house with a hipped roof. This was in poor condition in 1979.

The school is the Phoenix Academy.
