= Farrar Homeplace =

Historic house in Tennessee, United States

- U.S. National Register of Historic Places
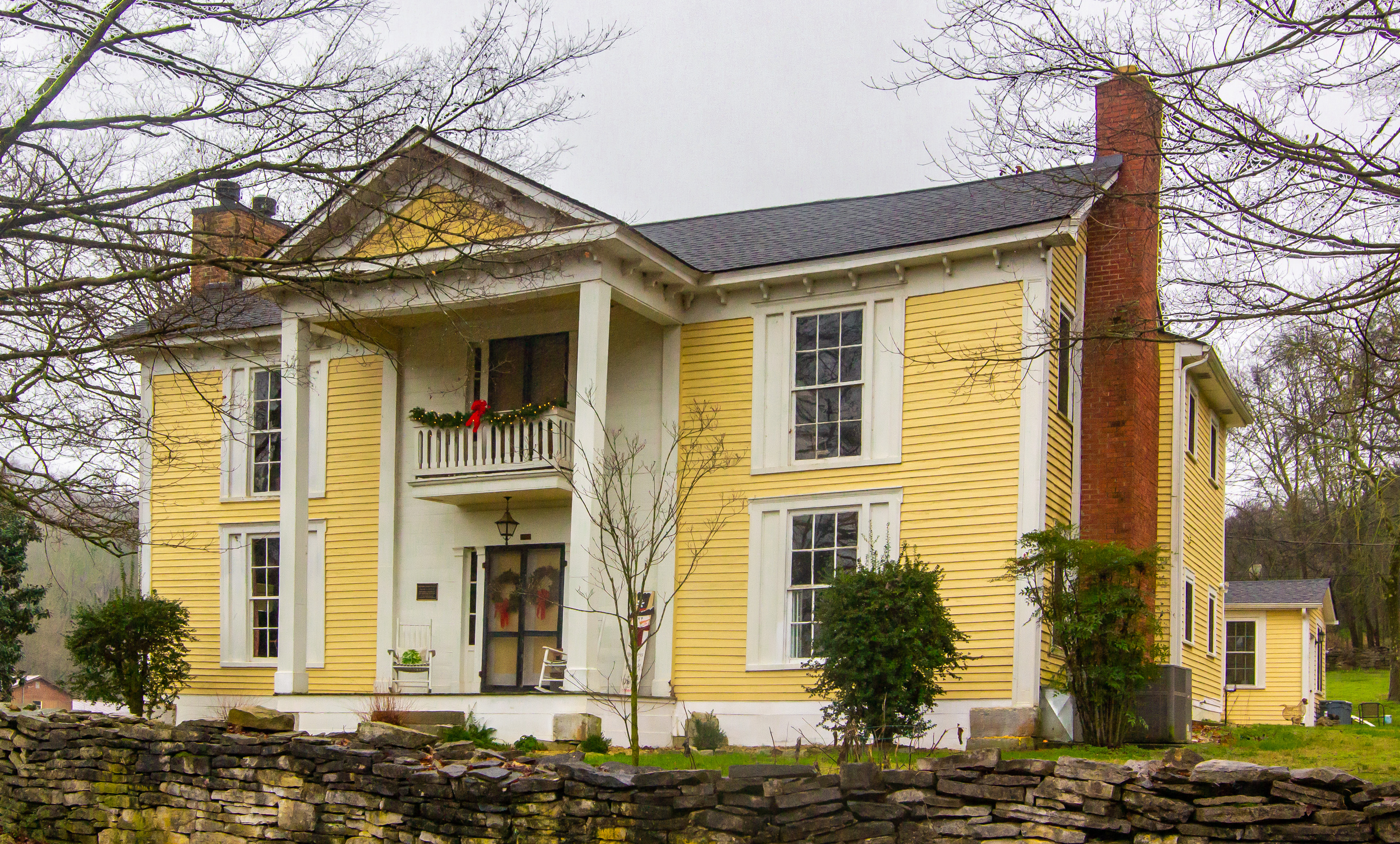

- Location within Tennessee Location within the United States
- Location: 170 Ike Farrar Rd.
- Nearest city: Shelbyville, Tennessee
- Coordinates: 35°21′37″N 86°23′24″W
- Area: 2 acres (0.81 ha)
- Built: 1848
- Architectural style: Greek Revival, I-house
- NRHP reference No.: 90001657
- Added to NRHP: November 7, 1990

The Farrar Homeplace is a historic mansion in Shelbyville, Tennessee, U.S.. It was built circa 1848 for James Franklin Farrar. According to the "family tradition", the house played a minor role during the American Civil War. Indeed, five soldiers of the Union Army died in the house after they drank the laudanum that Farrar was using to heal his wounds from the Battle of Bull Run as a member of the Confederate States Army. (Note: The source refers to "Battle of Bull Run", which might be presumed to mean the 1861 First Battle of Bull Run rather than the 1862 Second Battle of Bull Run, but it is not clear.) By 1990, the house still belonged to the Farrar family. It has been listed on the National Register of Historic Places since November 7, 1990.
