= Grasslands, Bloemfontein =

Grasslands
- Location within Free State (South African province) Location within South Africa
- Coordinates: 29.155°S 26.282°E
- Country: South Africa
- Province: Free State
- Municipality: Mangaung
- Main Place: Bloemfontein

Government
  - Councillor: 7

Area
  - Total: 5.91 km^{2} (2.28 sq mi)

Population (2011)
  - Total: 34,601
  - Density: 5,850/km^{2} (15,200/sq mi)

Racial makeup (2011)
  - Black African: 91.1%
  - Coloured: 8.2%
  - Indian/Asian: 0.3%
  - White: 0.35%

First languages (2011)
  - Sotho: 64.2%
  - Afrikaans: 10.9%
  - Xhosa: 10.9
  - Other: 14%
- Time zone: UTC+2 (SAST)
- Postal code (street): 9306
- PO box: 9380
- Area code: 051

Grasslands is a 91% black suburb of the city of Bloemfontein in South Africa.
