= Jenkins Lutheran Chapel and Cemetery =

Historic cemetery in Tennessee, United States

- U.S. National Register of Historic Places
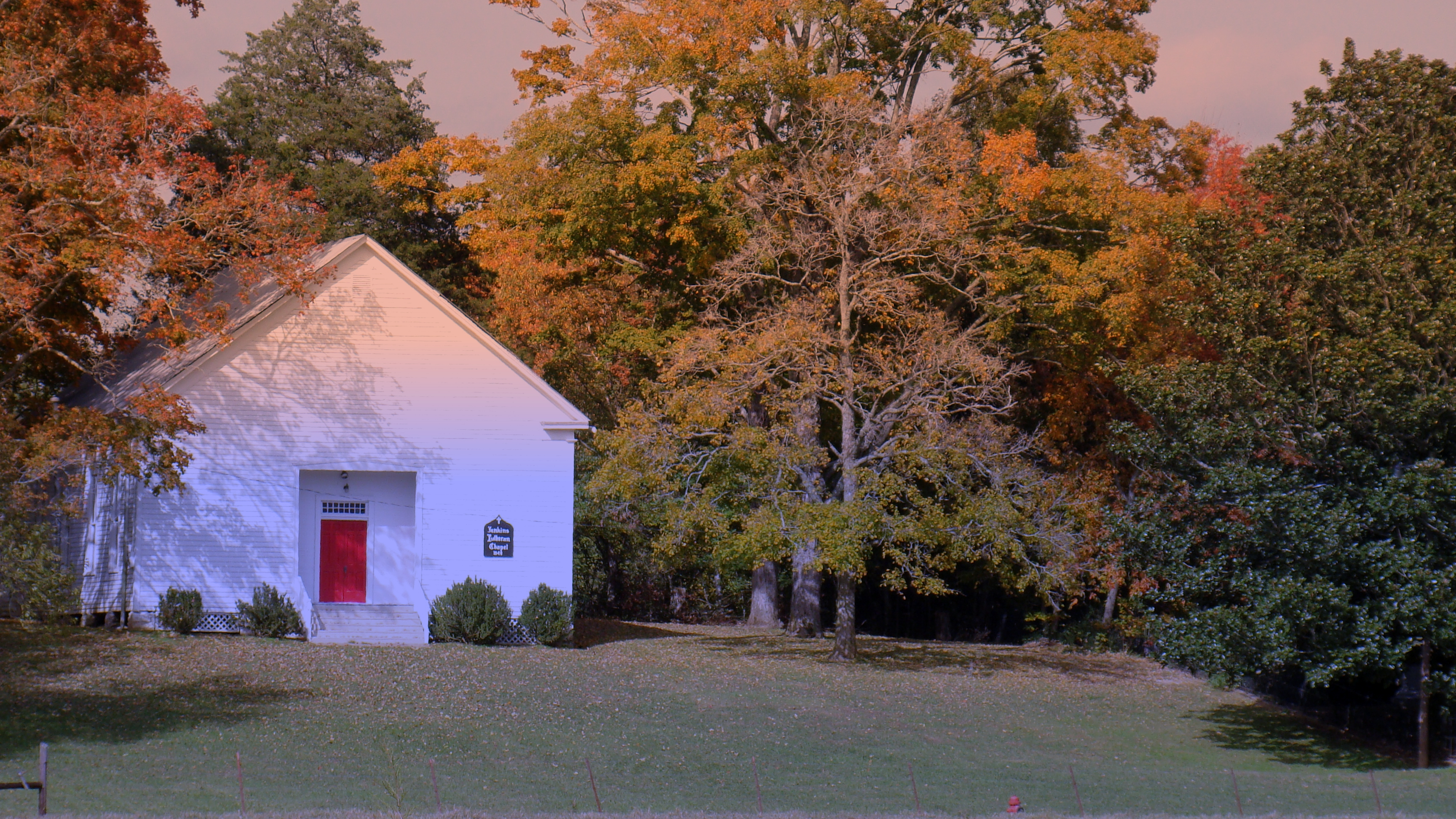

- Location within Tennessee Location within the United States
- Nearest city: Shelbyville, Tennessee
- Coordinates: 35°27′46″N 86°22′48″W
- Area: 5.5 acres (2.2 ha)
- Built: 1886
- Architect: Shofner, Loton; Shofner, Jacob Morton
- Architectural style: gable-front form
- NRHP reference No.: 97001231
- Added to NRHP: October 17, 1997

Jenkins Lutheran Chapel and Cemetery is a historic Lutheran church near Shelbyville, Tennessee.

The church building was completed in 1886. Around 1976 it ceased being used as a church and was renamed "Jenkins Chapel." It is now maintained by a nonprofit religious organization that was established to preserve the building and grounds. It was added to the National Register of Historic Places in 1997.

Three term (1939–45) Tennessee Governor Prentice Cooper (1895–1969) is buried there.

== See also ==
- Shofner's Lutheran Chapel
