= Eatonton Historic District =

Historic district in Georgia, United States

- U.S. National Register of Historic Places
- U.S. Historic district
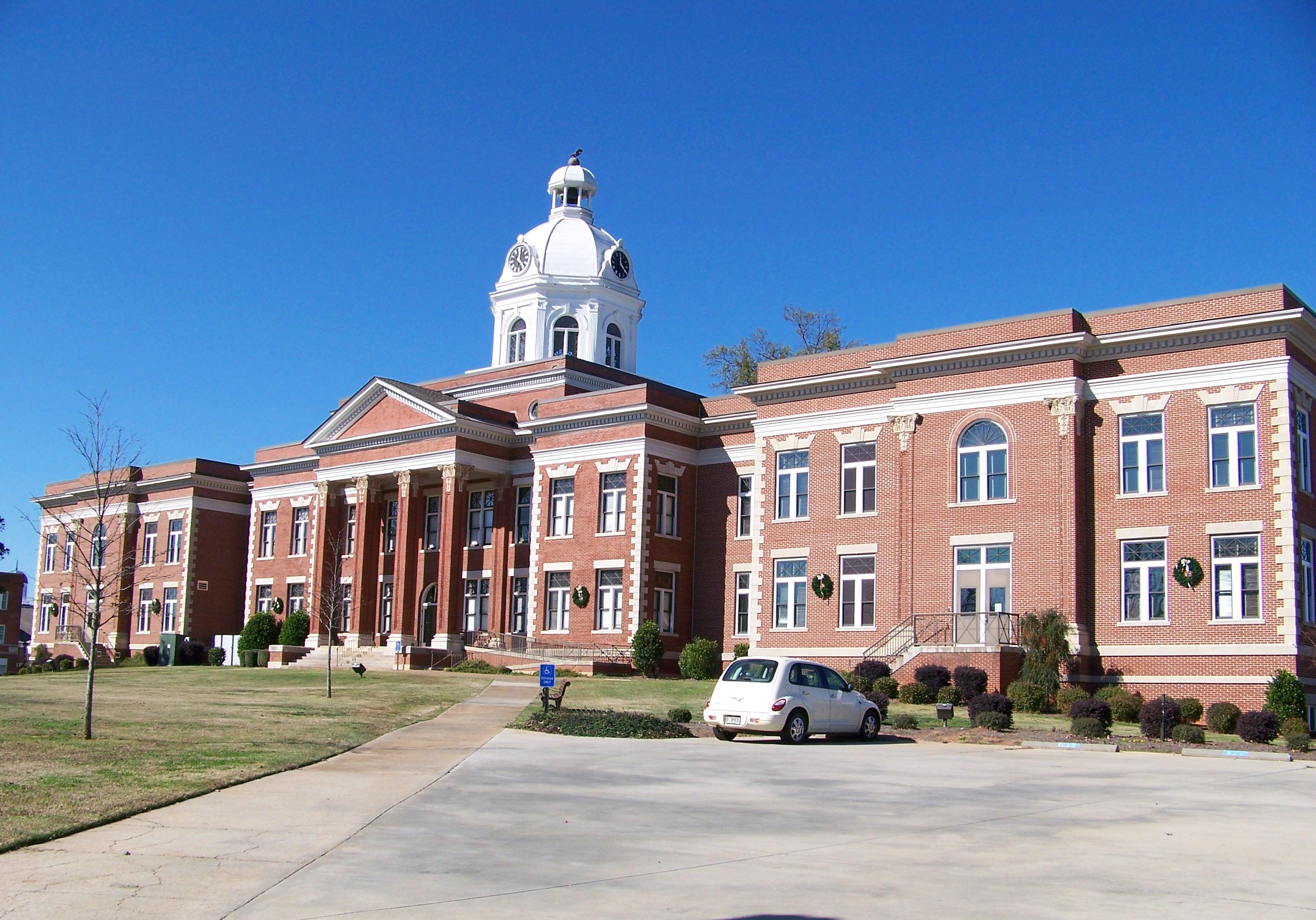
- Putnam County Courthouse

- Location within Georgia Location within the United States
- Location: Most of town centered around courthouse and city hall, Eatonton, Georgia
- Coordinates: 33°19′50″N 83°23′17″W
- Area: 275 acres (111 ha)
- Architect: Multiple
- Architectural style: Greek Revival, Queen Anne, Victorian
- NRHP reference No.: 75000605
- Added to NRHP: June 13, 1975

The Eatonton Historic District in Eatonton, Georgia is a 275 acres (111 ha) historic district which is centered around the Putnam County Courthouse and the city hall, and includes most of the town. It was listed on the National Register of Historic Places in 1975; the listing included 60 contributing buildings.

Eatonton was incorporated as a town in 1809 and became a city in 1879.

The district includes:

- Putnam County Courthouse (1905-1906), the third courthouse built on its site
- Napier-Reid-Bronson House (1824), formerly the Eagal Tavern, a two-story frame house with fluted doric columns supporting its wraparound porch (added in 1850)
- Slade-Dunn House (c.1850) about which has been written: "Greek Revival architecture seems to have reached a certain classic perfection" in this house.
