= Herbert A. Sadler House =

Historic house in Massachusetts, United States

- U.S. National Register of Historic Places
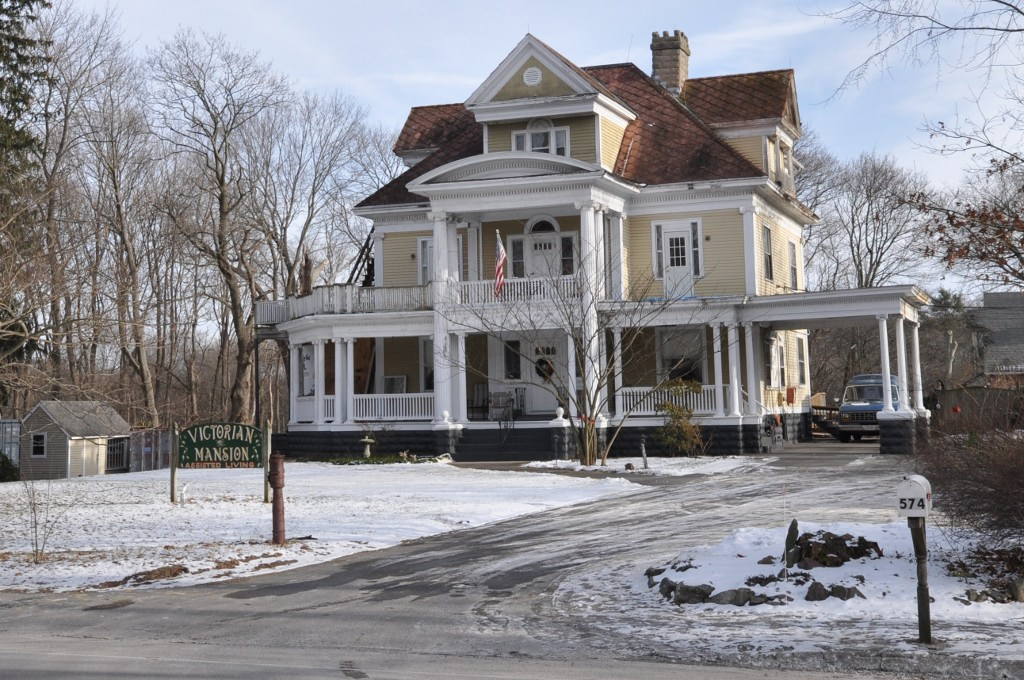

- Location within Massachusetts Location within the United States
- Location: 574 Newport Ave., Attleboro, Massachusetts
- Coordinates: 41°55′20″N 71°21′16″W
- Area: 1 acre (0.40 ha)
- Built: 1906
- Architect: Samuel B. Fuller
- Architectural style: Colonial Revival
- NRHP reference No.: 82000489
- Added to NRHP: October 21, 1982

The Herbert A. Sadler House is a historic house located at 574 Newport Avenue in Attleboro, Massachusetts. Built in 1906, it is one of the city's most elaborate examples of Colonial Revival architecture. It was built for Herbert Sadler, the owner of Sadler Brothers, one of the city's leading jewelry firms of the period. The house was listed on the National Register of Historic Places on October 21, 1982. It now houses an assisted living facility.

== Description and history ==
The Herbert A. Sadler House is located in the western part of Attleboro, on the south side of Newport Avenue (Massachusetts Route 123) at its junction with Park Place. It is a large 2 1/2-story wood-frame structure with Colonial Revival. It is covered by a hip roof with extended eaves, and is distinguished by its front porch and side porte cochere. The porch has a central two-story section with monumental Ionic columns rising to a segmented-arch pediment. The porch extends as a single story across the front and wraps around to the left side, with a balustrade on the second level on the left portion. Its supports are clusters of narrow Ionic columns, which also support the porte cochere. The interior retains many original features, including period woodwork, tile fireplace surround, and stained glass windows. Two of the downstairs chambers have original early electric chandeliers.

The house was designed by Samuel B. Fuller of Pawtucket, Rhode Island and built in 1906. Fuller also designed houses for Henry Cole in Providence) in 1910 and Bernard T. Lennon in Pawtucket in 1917. This house remained in Sadler's family until 1953. It is now a rest home called the Victorian House.

== See also ==
- National Register of Historic Places listings in Bristol County, Massachusetts
