= East Shelbyville Historic District =

Historic district in Tennessee, United States

- U.S. National Register of Historic Places
- U.S. Historic district
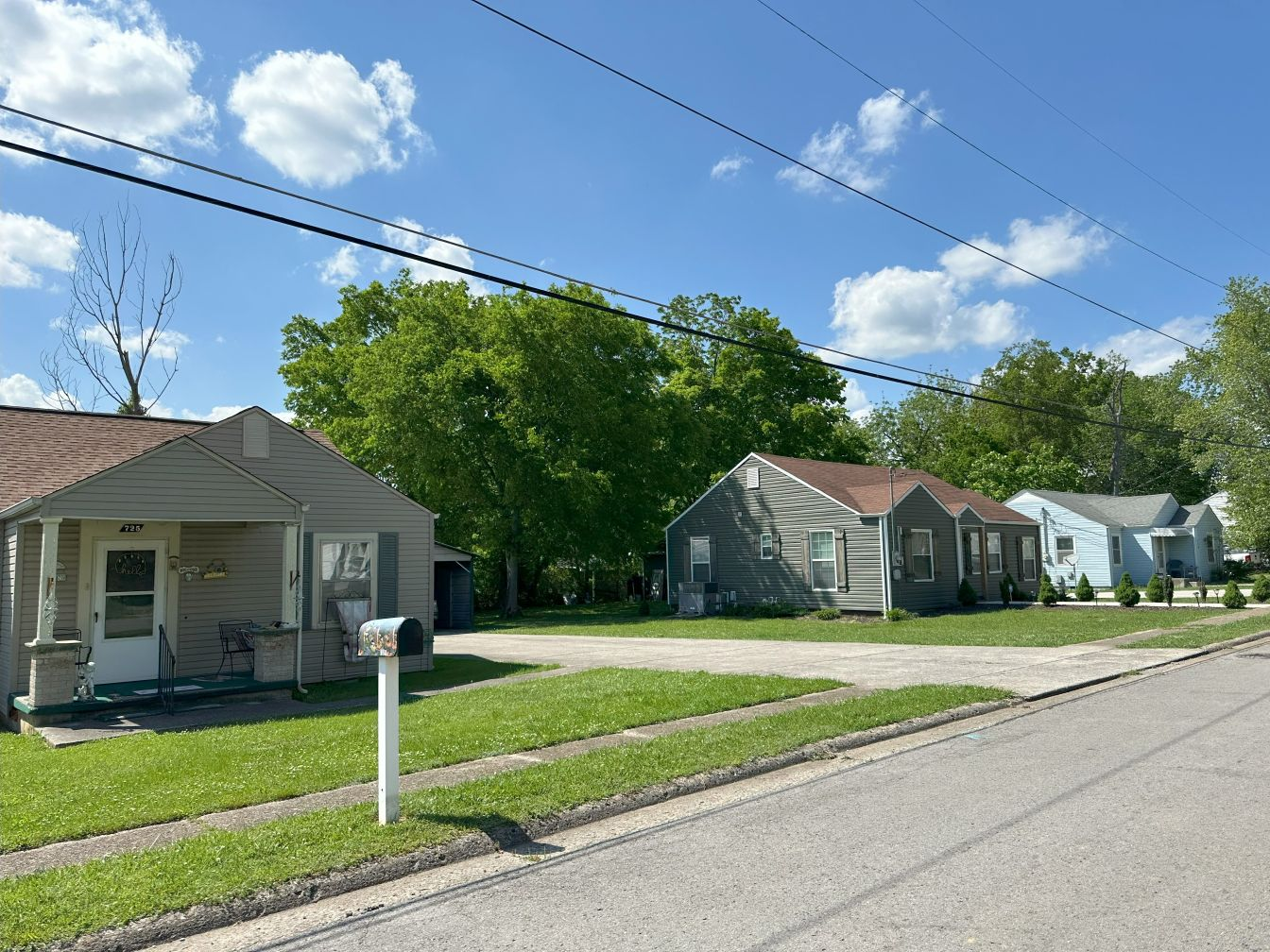
- NRHP reference No.: 90000594
- Added to NRHP: April 1990

The East Shelbyville Historic District is a historic district on the east side of Shelbyville, Tennessee. It includes roughly ten square blocks, mostly residential. It is bordered by the N. Brittian, Louisville, and Nashville railroad tracks and Lane, Evans, Sandusky and Madison Streets. It was listed on the National Register of Historic Places in April 1990.
