= Fly Manufacturing Company Building =

- U.S. National Register of Historic Places
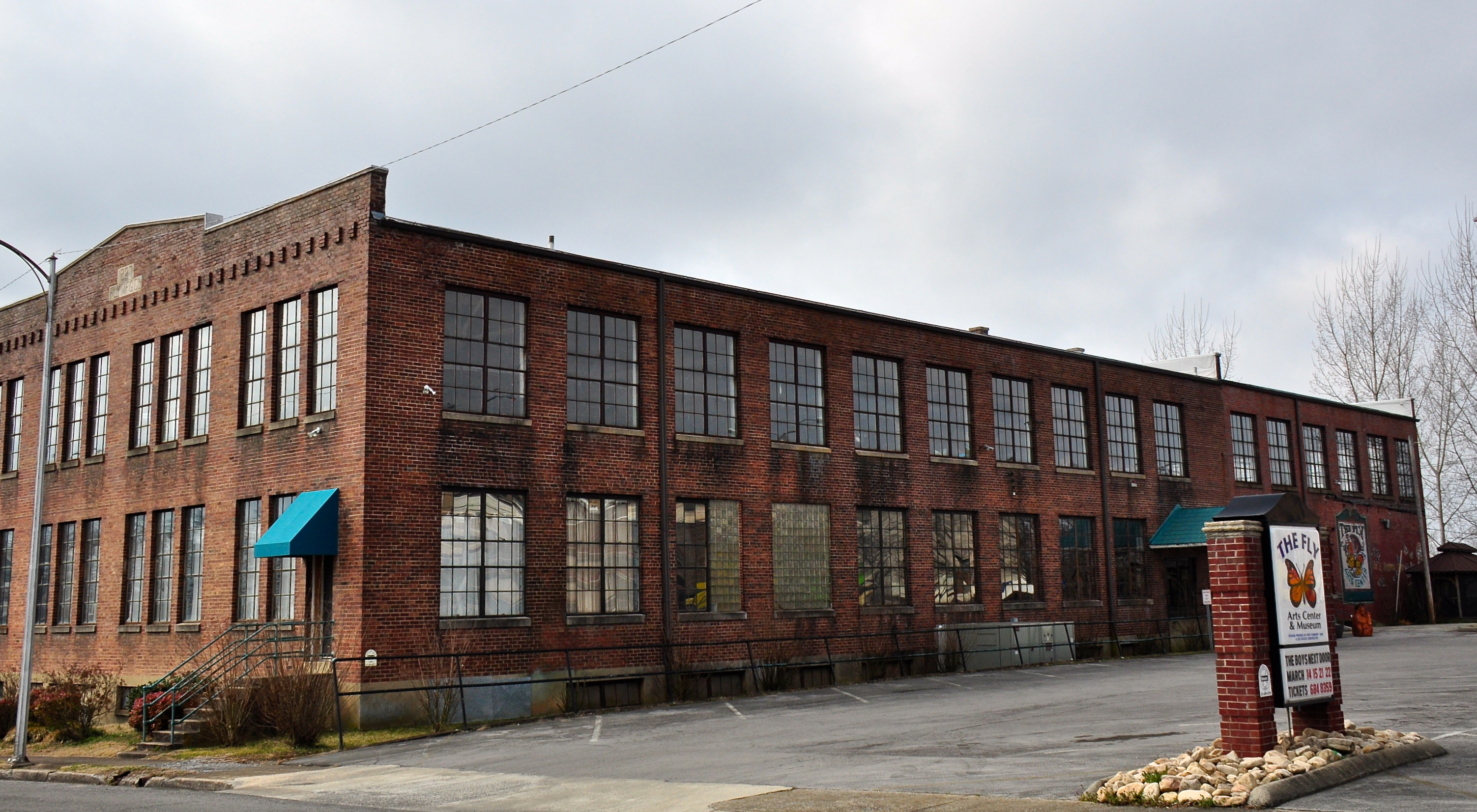

- Location within Tennessee Location within the United States
- Location: 204 S. Main St., Shelbyville, Tennessee
- Coordinates: 35°28′53″N 86°27′42″W
- Area: 1 acre (0.40 ha)
- Built: 1927
- Built by: Col. John Morgan Raney
- Architectural style: Early 20th century industrial
- NRHP reference No.: 96000226
- Added to NRHP: March 7, 1996

The Fly Manufacturing Company Building is a historic industrial building in Shelbyville, Tennessee, that now houses the Fly Arts Center, a cultural facility. It is listed on the National Register of Historic Places.

== History ==
The Fly Manufacturing Company was a textile manufacturing business that operated in Shelbyville from 1915 to 1985. The business was established by Joel Orval Fly, who had previously managed a textile factory in Clarksville, Tennessee. After arriving in Shelbyville in 1915, he opened a factory a workforce of 18 to 20 people made overalls, pants and work shirts. The following year, Fly expanded his operation into a larger facility, where it continued for about a decade before he began construction of the Fly Manufacturing Building.

In 1925, he hired John Morgan Raney to build the new factory building, which was completed in 1927. A two-story industrial building with a full basement and dimensions of 75 feet (23 m) 125 feet (38 m), it was one of the largest buildings in the city at the time of its completion.

In the 1920s, Shelbyville was a center of industrial activity. As of 1928, Fly employed 75 people in the production of shirts. The factory's products were sold both to local stores and national businesses such as Sears and Montgomery Ward.

Fly Manufacturing remained in business through the Great Depression, but with reduced work schedules that allowed all employees to work at least two or three days weekly. During World War II the factory made pants, jackets, and fatigues for American soldiers.

Joel Fly died in 1960. The company he established continued to operate as an independent manufacturing company until 1972, when it was sold to the Bayly Corporation, a garment manufacturer based in Denver, Colorado. Bayly converted the facility to a distribution center for the southeastern United States. In 1980, Bayly sold the facility to the Woodway Corporation. Woodway returned the building to its original use as a factory and produced clothing there until 1985, when a decline in business led it to cease operations.

== Preservation and transformation into Fly Arts Center ==
After the factory closed, the building was neglected for about a decade. In 1996, it was listed on the National Register of Historic Places in recognition of its significance in Shelbyville's industrial history. The Bedford County Arts Council restored the building and converted it to its current use as an arts center. As the Fly Arts Center, it houses a theater, museum, art gallery, classrooms, and a gift shop.
