= Wartrace Historic District =

Historic district in Tennessee, United States

- U.S. National Register of Historic Places
- U.S. Historic district
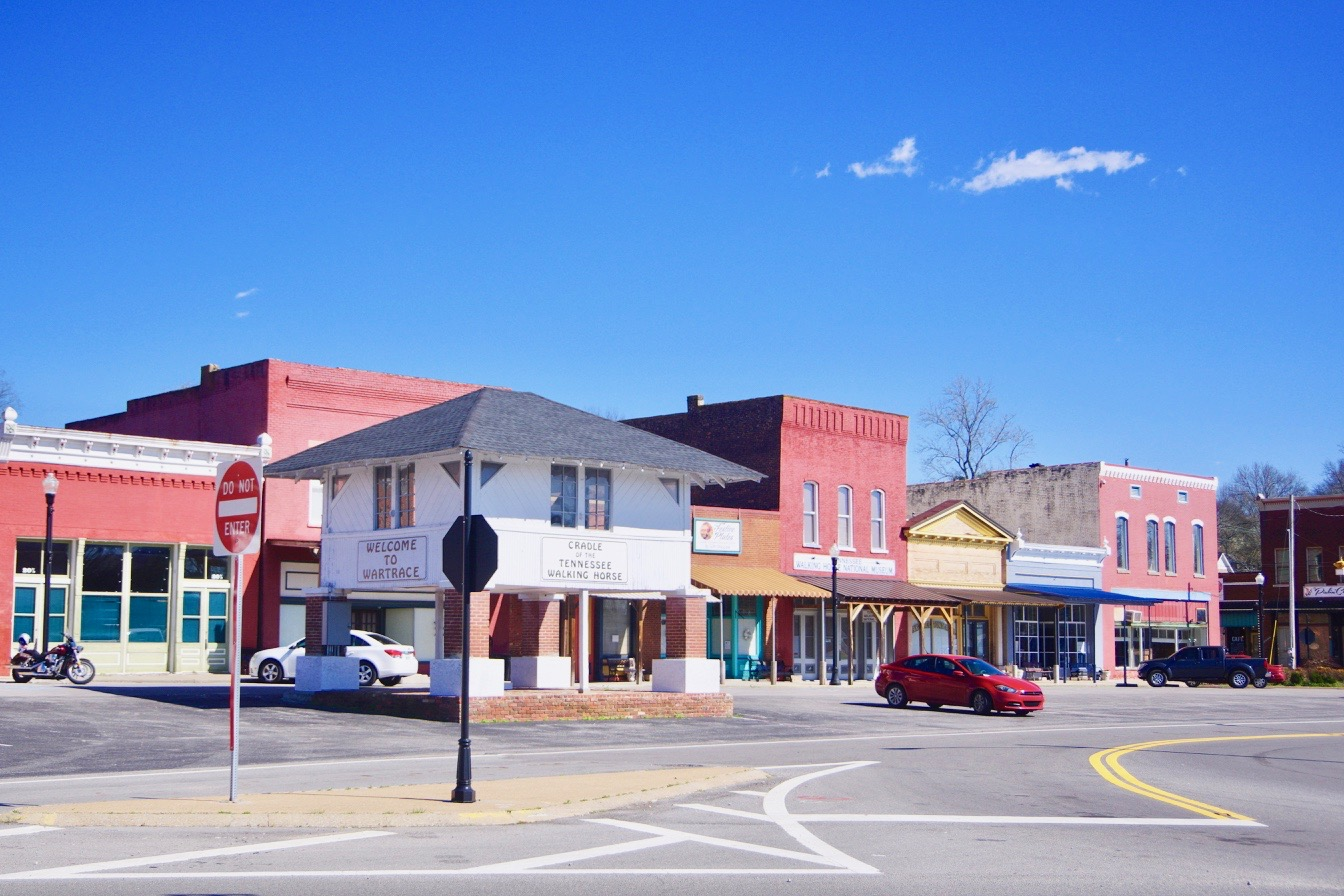
- Wartrace Historic District

- Location within Tennessee Location within the United States
- Location: Wartrace, Tennessee
- Coordinates: 35°31′38″N 86°20′4″W
- NRHP reference No.: 91000914
- Added to NRHP: 1991

The Wartrace Historic District is an area on the National Register of Historic Places. It covers an area in downtown Wartrace, Tennessee ranging roughly from Spring Street, from Coffey to Main Streets, from Vine Street from Broad to McKinley Streets, and Knob Circle Road from Main to McKinley Streets.

== Buildings within the district ==
Some notable structures within the district include Bethsalem Community Chapel, the Wartrace General Store, and the Caboose Museum, which houses railroad relics. Perfection Leather, a business in operation since the early 1900s, is known for making the saddles worn by the first three national champion Tennessee Walkers. It also manufactured the bridle worn by Bonnie Blue Butler's pony in the 1939 film Gone with the Wind. A structure included in the district that has earned its own NRHP designation is the Walking Horse Hotel. Architecture within the district encompasses the Queen Anne, Italianate, and Bungalow styles.
