= Shofner's Lutheran Chapel =

Historic church in Tennessee

- Shofners' Lutheran Church and Cemetery
- U.S. National Register of Historic Places
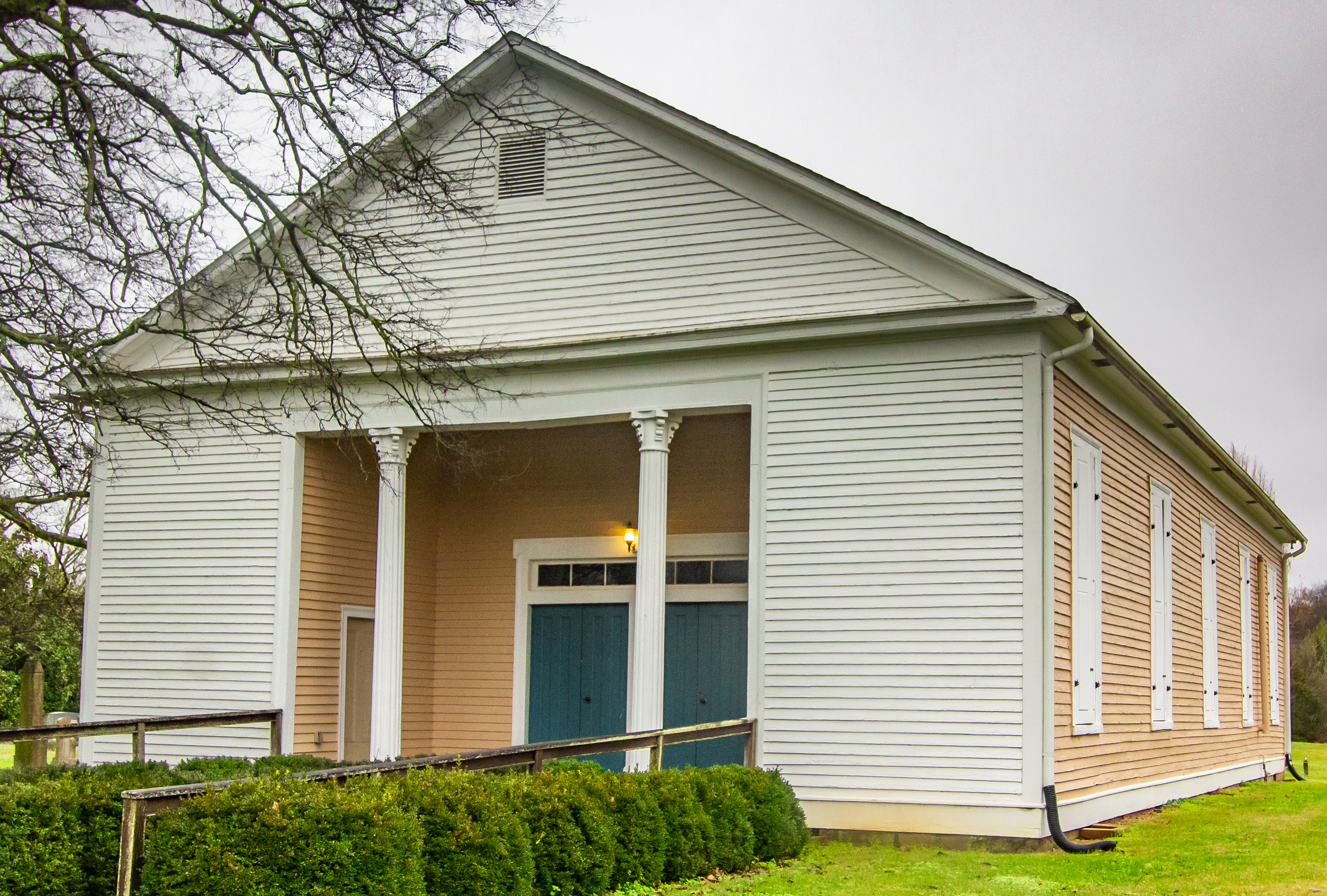

- Location within Tennessee Location within the United States
- Location: 2896 US-41A
- Nearest city: Wartrace, Tennessee, U.S.
- Coordinates: 35°26′48″N 86°19′46″W
- Area: 2.4 acres (0.97 ha)
- Architect: Congregation
- Architectural style: Greek Revival influences
- NRHP reference No.: 97001232
- Added to NRHP: July 10, 1998

Shofner's Lutheran Chapel is a historic church on Thompson's Creek near Shelbyville, Tennessee, United States. The church and adjacent cemetery are listed on the National Register of Historic Places as Shofners' Lutheran Church and Cemetery.

== History ==
The church was established by Martin Shofner in 1808. A log church was built on a portion of the land grant that Shofner had received for Revolutionary War service. The church is said to be the first Lutheran congregation in Tennessee or anywhere west of the Allegheny Mountains.

The current church building is a clapboard Greek Revival-influenced building built around 1870. The benches in its interior came from an earlier log church building and are made from solid walnut. The congregation is no longer active, but the descendants of Martin Shofner continue to use the church for special occasions.

The church building and cemetery were added to the National Register of Historic Places in 1998. In 2008, the Tennessee Preservation Trust placed the church on the organization's annual list of the state's "Most Endangered Historic Places" because of concerns that the planned widening of U.S. Route 41A would adversely affect the church's historic landscape and viewshed. The Tennessee Department of Transportation later revised its construction plans for the highway project to avoid adverse impacts. On June 9, 2014, a storm damaged the church roof and knocked down some trees in the churchyard.

== See also ==
- Jenkins Lutheran Chapel and Cemetery
