= Terrell-Sadler House =

Historic house in Georgia, United States

- U.S. National Register of Historic Places
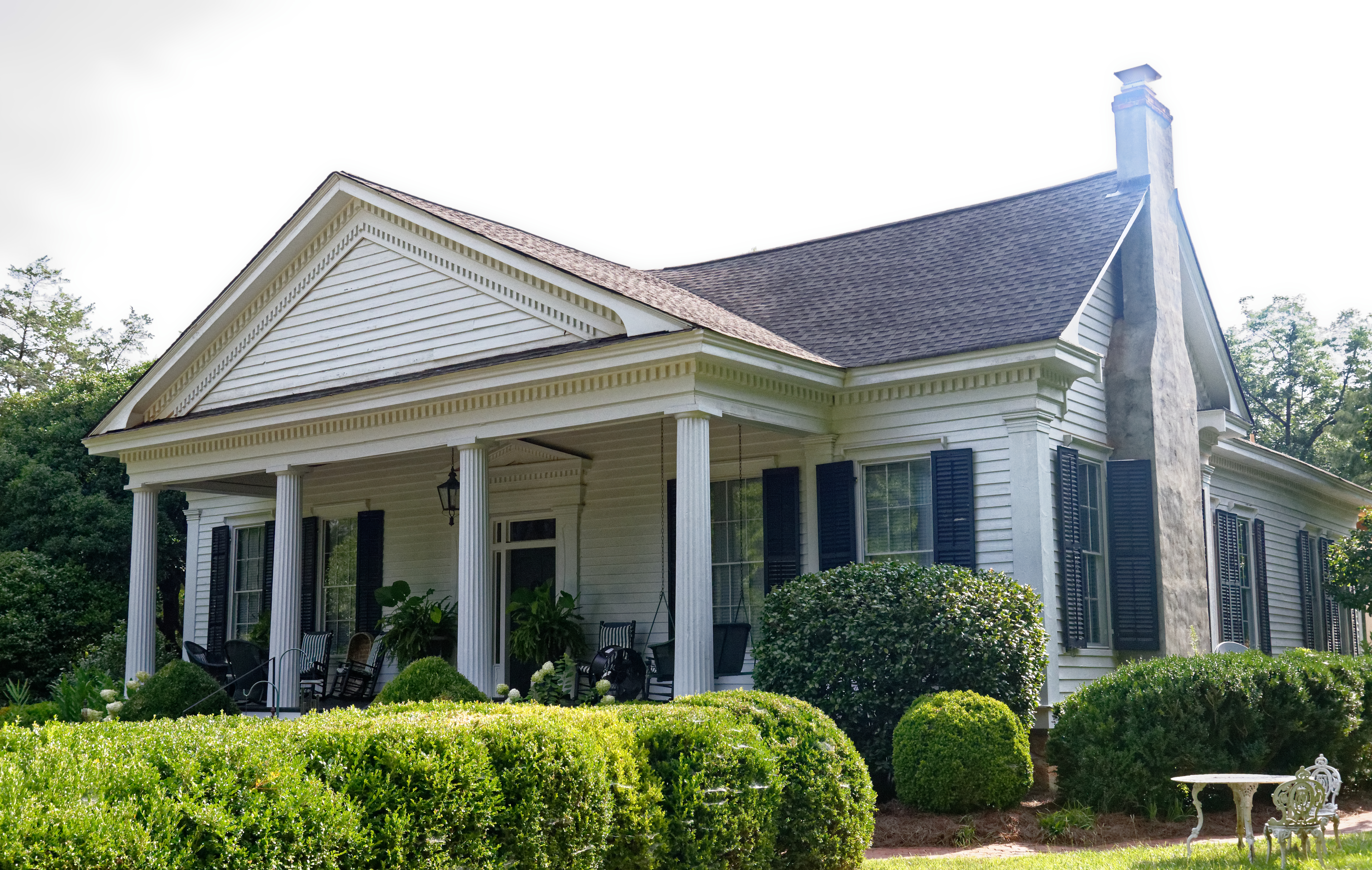

- Location within Georgia
- Nearest city: Eatonton, Georgia
- Coordinates: 33°25′52″N 83°22′14″W
- Area: 7.80 acres (3.16 ha)
- Built: c.1854
- Architectural style: Greek Revival
- NRHP reference No.: 00000303
- Added to NRHP: March 31, 2000

The Terrell-Sadler House near Eatonton, Georgia was listed on the National Register of Historic Places in 2000. It is located at 122 Harmony Road.

The house was built about 1855 and included 700 acres of land. It is listed as an outstanding example of a Greek Revival-style plantation house.

William D. Terrell (1810-1875) was probably born in Putnam County. He married Mary Sadler in 1855. He had few possessions before his marriage. In 1855 he owned 700 acres of land and had 20 slaves. By 1860 the main house, five houses for the slaves, a house for the cotton gin, a carriage house, and barns had been constructed.

At the time of the American Civil War, Terrell was too old for military service but served in the Home Guard. In November, 1864, Gen. William T. Sherman of the U.S. Army was on his March to the Sea. Sherman's 14th Corps, going from Madison, Georgia to Eatonton, camped at the plantation for one day. Sherman's soldiers burned the cotton gin and the packing screw, destroyed other farm equipment, stole the mules and horses, killed the chickens, and took six slaves. The house was not destroyed.

By 1880, their only son, Richmond, managed the plantation. Farming operations declined. Land was sold to pay debts and he had only 25 acres of cotton plants, which produced only 8 bales of cotton. Richmond mortgaged the remaining 500-acre farm and it was eventually foreclosed.
