= Frierson-Coble House =

Historic house in Tennessee, United States

- U.S. National Register of Historic Places
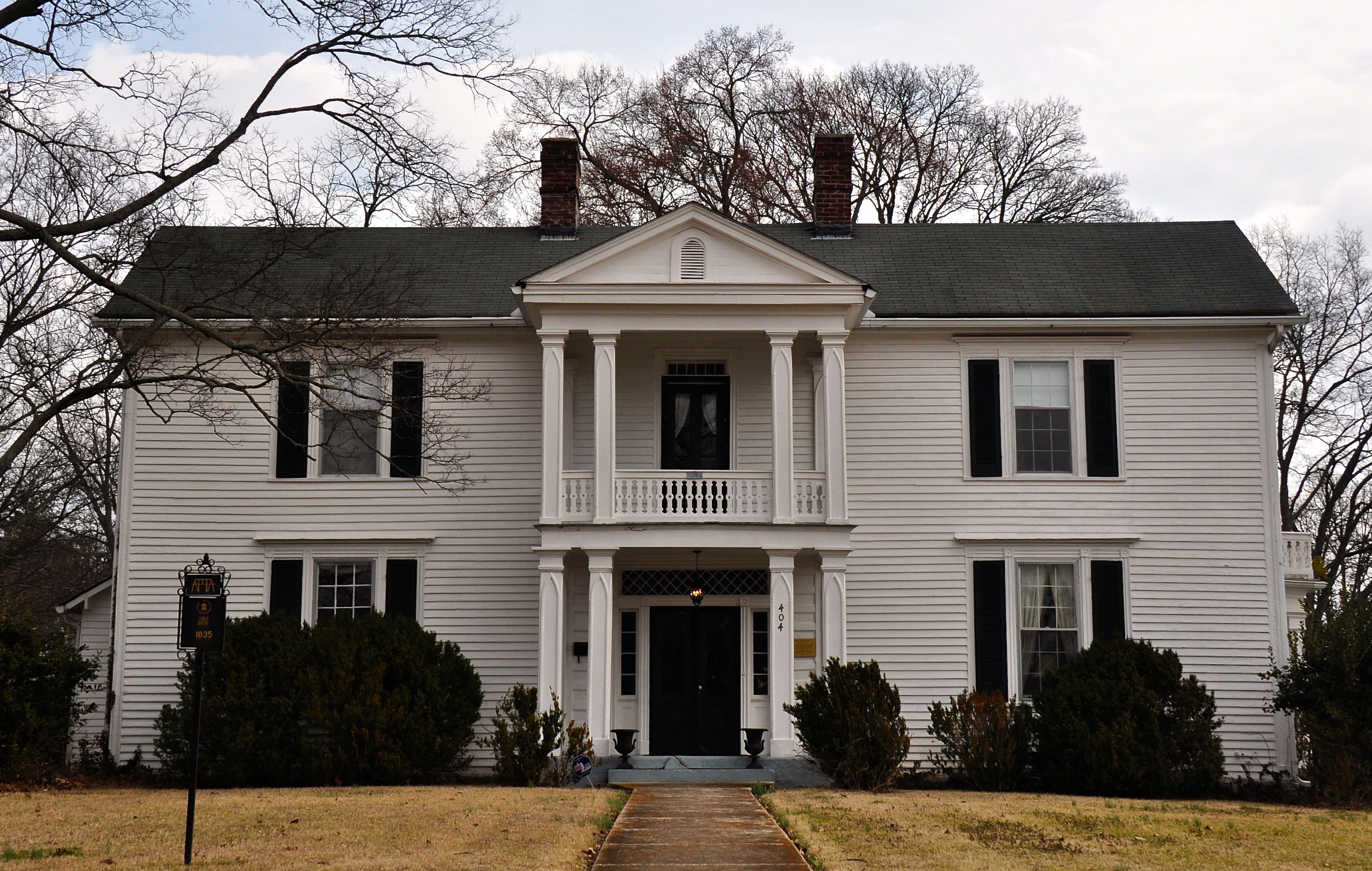
- The Frierson-Coble House in 2014

- Location within Tennessee Location within the United States
- Location: 404 North Jefferson Street, Shelbyville, Tennessee
- Coordinates: 35°29′6″N 86°27′27″W
- Area: 1.5 acres (0.61 ha)
- Built: 1835
- Architectural style: Greek Revival, Gothic, Federal
- NRHP reference No.: 82003951
- Added to NRHP: April 12, 1982

The Frierson-Coble House is a historic house in Shelbyville, Tennessee, U.S.. It was built in 1835 for Erwin J. Frierson, who was trained as a lawyer by James K. Polk, who went on to serve as the 11th President of the United States from 1845 to 1849. Frierson served as a member of the Tennessee House of Representatives in 1845. In 1888, the house was purchased by Dr Neely Coble, a physician; it was later inherited by his son, Thomas Coble, also a physician. By the 1980s, it still belonged to the Coble family. It has been listed on the National Register of Historic Places since April 12, 1982.
