= Singleton House (Eatonton, Georgia) =

Historic house in Georgia, United States

- U.S. National Register of Historic Places
- Location within Georgia
- Nearest city: Eatonton, Georgia
- Coordinates: 33°18′03″N 83°29′50″W
- Area: 60 acres (24 ha)
- Built: c.1854
- Built by: Suiter, S.J.
- Architectural style: Greek Revival, Italianate
- NRHP reference No.: 74000701
- Added to NRHP: October 1, 1974

The Singleton House near Eatonton, Georgia was listed on the National Register of Historic Places in 1974. It is located southwest of Eatonton, off Georgia Route 16. More specifically, it is about seven miles west of Eatonton, then one mile south of the intersection of Highway 16 and Georgia Highway 142, on the right fork of a what was a dirt road in 1974. In 2018, it may be located off what is now named McMillen Road, and may be the structure at exactly 33.297786°N 83.493705°W.

The house, which has also been known as the Singleton-McMillen House, was built around 1854. It is a Greek Revival-style plantation house once associated with about 1,500 acres (6.1 km^{2}) of farmland.

It was deemed notable as "an outstanding cultural example of a modest, yet classically sophisticated plantation residence that was originally owned by prominent Putnam County citizens David and Rebecca Singleton."
