= Wartrace, Tennessee =

Wartrace
- Town
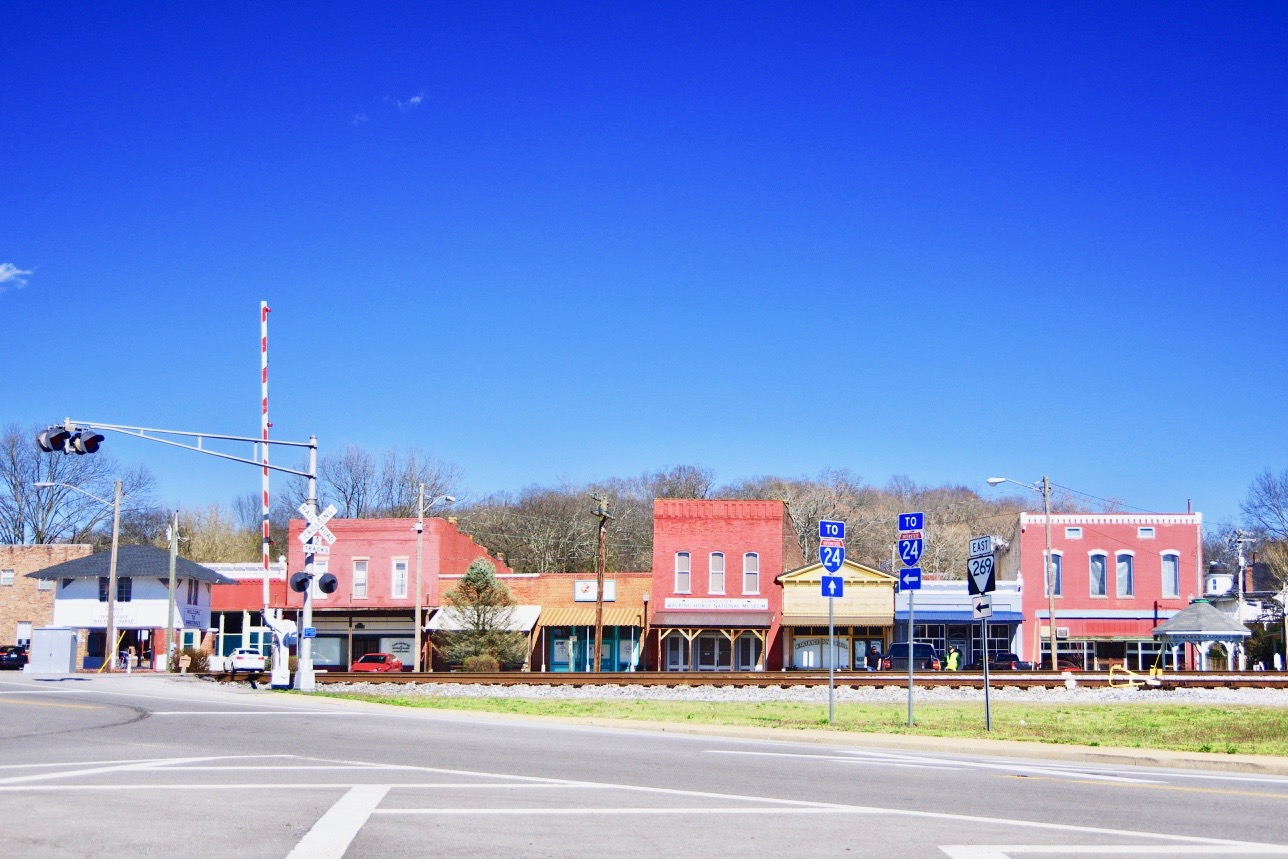
- Downtown Wartrace
- Nickname: The Cradle of the Walking Horse
- Location of Wartrace in Bedford County, Tennessee.
- Coordinates: 35°31′37″N 86°19′51″W
- Country: United States
- State: Tennessee
- County: Bedford
- Incorporated: 1858
- Named for: Indian trail that passed through the area

Government
  - Mayor: TBD

Area
  - Total: 0.88 sq mi (2.27 km^{2})
  - Land: 0.88 sq mi (2.27 km^{2})
  - Water: 0 sq mi (0.00 km^{2})
- Elevation: 833 ft (254 m)

Population (2020)
  - Total: 653
  - Density: 745.3/sq mi (287.78/km^{2})
- Time zone: UTC-6 (Central (CST))
  - Summer (DST): UTC-5 (CDT)
- ZIP code: 37183
- Area code: 931
- FIPS code: 47-78120
- GNIS feature ID: 1304389
- Website: https://www.townofwartrace.com/

Wartrace is a town in Bedford County, Tennessee. The population was 653 at the 2020 census. It is located northeast of Shelbyville. The downtown area is listed on the National Register of Historic Places as the Wartrace Historic District.

Wartrace is a hub of the Tennessee Walking Horse industry and has been nicknamed "the cradle of the Tennessee Walking Horse". It is home to the Wartrace Horse Show, held annually since 1906, and the Tennessee Walking Horse National Museum has been headquartered in downtown Wartrace since 2012.

== History ==
The name "Wartrace" is rooted in a Native American trail that once passed through the area. The town, initially known as "Wartrace Depot," was established in the early 1850s as a stop on the newly constructed Nashville and Chattanooga Railroad.

During the Civil War, the town was the winter headquarters of Confederate General William J. Hardee during the aftermath of the Battle of Stones River, and the Old Chockley Tavern in Wartrace was a gathering place for Confederate officers during the Tullahoma Campaign. A skirmish was fought at Wartrace on April 11, 1862.

With the increase in rail travel in the late 19th century, Wartrace experienced a boom period. At its height, the town had six inns and hotels, and serviced 13 trains per day. One hotel, the Walking Horse Hotel, is still in business today.

Wartrace is connected to Shelbyville by the Walking Horse and Eastern Railroad, a historic rail line that is still in part-time operation.

In the early 1900s, Wartrace served as a breeding center for the Tennessee Walking Horse, and the Wartrace Horse Show was founded in the town.

In 1972, Cascade K-5 opened as a result of the Bell Buckle School fire which displaced students within city limits of Bell Buckle, Tennessee, Shelbyville, Tennessee, and Wartrace. Cascade Middle & High School have a varsity football team, drama club (The Black Curtain Players), marching band, men & women's soccer, softball, and baseball teams. In the fall of 2012, the Cascade High School Marching Band won the Division 1 TN Marching Band State Championship at Riverdale High School (Murfreesboro, Tennessee).

== Geography ==
Wartrace is located at 35°31′37″N 86°19′51″W (35.526872, -86.330739).

According to the United States Census Bureau, the town has a total area of 0.7 square miles (1.8 km^{2}), all of it land.

=== Climate ===
Climate is characterized by relatively high temperatures and evenly distributed precipitation throughout the year. The Köppen Climate Classification subtype for this climate is "Cfa" (Humid Subtropical Climate).

Climate data for Wartrace, TN
Month	Jan	Feb	Mar	Apr	May	Jun	Jul	Aug	Sep	Oct	Nov	Dec	Year
Mean daily maximum °C (°F)	9 (49)	12 (53)	17 (62)	22 (72)	27 (80)	31 (87)	32 (90)	32 (89)	29 (84)	23 (73)	16 (61)	11 (52)	22 (71)
Mean daily minimum °C (°F)	−2 (28)	−1 (31)	3 (38)	8 (47)	13 (55)	17 (63)	19 (67)	19 (66)	15 (59)	8 (47)	3 (38)	−1 (31)	8 (47)
Average precipitation mm (inches)	120 (4.9)	120 (4.6)	150 (5.8)	110 (4.5)	130 (5.3)	110 (4.2)	120 (4.7)	94 (3.7)	100 (4)	86 (3.4)	120 (4.6)	130 (5.2)	1,400 (55)
Average precipitation days	11	11	11	10	10	10	10	8	8	7	9	11	116
Source: Weatherbase

== Demographics ==
Historical population
Census	Pop.	Note	%±
1880	468		—
1890	686		46.6%
1900	642		−6.4%
1910	659		2.6%
1920	619		−6.1%
1930	606		−2.1%
1940	552		−8.9%
1950	545		−1.3%
1960	545		0.0%
1970	616		13.0%
1980	540		−12.3%
1990	494		−8.5%
2000	548		10.9%
2010	651		18.8%
2020	653		0.3%

As of the census of 2000, there were 548 people, 234 households, and 147 families residing in the town. The population density was 800.0 inhabitants per square mile (308.9/km^{2}). There were 250 housing units at an average density of 365.0 per square mile (140.9/km^{2}). The racial makeup of the town was 88.14% White, 8.94% African American, 0.73% from other races, and 2.19% from two or more races. Hispanic or Latino of any race were 1.64% of the population.

There were 234 households, out of which 30.3% had children under the age of 18 living with them, 48.3% were married couples living together, 9.8% had a female householder with no husband present, and 36.8% were non-families. 33.8% of all households were made up of individuals, and 17.1% had someone living alone who was 65 years of age or older. The average household size was 2.34 and the average family size was 2.99.

In the town, the population was spread out, with 25.7% under the age of 18, 6.8% from 18 to 24, 27.7% from 25 to 44, 22.3% from 45 to 64, and 17.5% who were 65 years of age or older. The median age was 38 years. For every 100 females, there were 100.0 males. For every 100 females age 18 and over, there were 90.2 males.

The median income for a household in the town was $29,500, and the median income for a family was $38,472. Males had a median income of $28,409 versus $19,565 for females. The per capita income for the town was $13,459. About 14.4% of families and 14.2% of the population were below the poverty line, including 16.3% of those under age 18 and 19.3% of those age 65 or over.

== Notable people ==
- Sondra Locke (1944–2018), Academy Award-nominated actress, lived on Horse Mountain Road
- Jimmy Cleveland (1926–2008), jazz trombonist signed by EmArcy Records.
