= FedEx =

American multinational conglomerate

FedEx Corporation

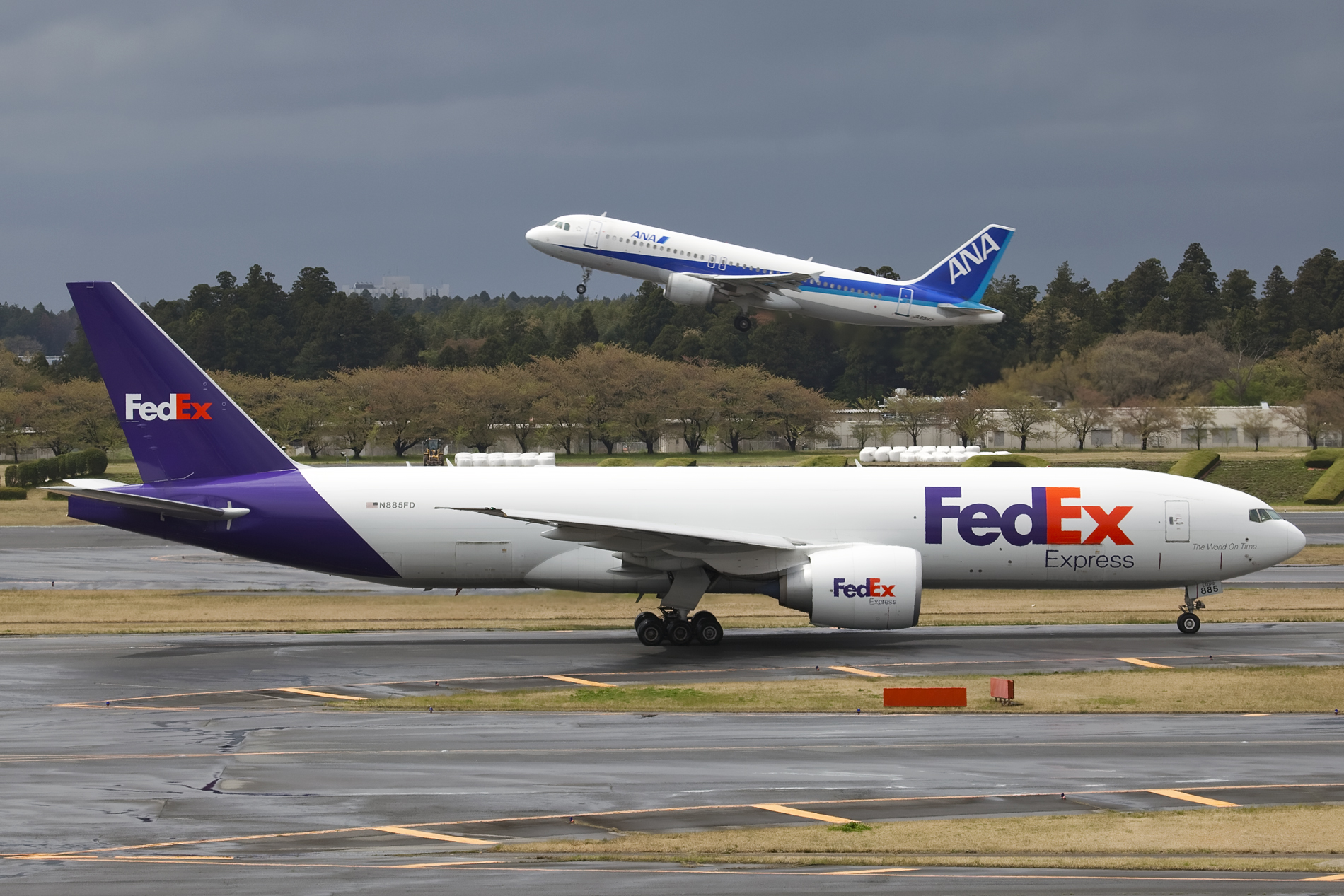
- FedEx Express Boeing 777F
- Trade name: FedEx
- Formerly: Federal Express Corporation (1971–1997); FDX Corporation (1997–2000)
- Type: Public
- Traded as: NYSE: FDX; DJTA component; S&P 100 component; S&P 500 component
- ISIN: US31428X1063
- Industry: E-commerce; Services; Transportation
- Founded: May 5, 1971; 55 years ago in Little Rock, Arkansas, U.S.
- Founder: Frederick W. Smith
- Headquarters: Memphis, Tennessee, United States
- Number of locations: 2,000 FedEx locations (2025)
- Area served: Worldwide
- Key people: R. Brad Martin (executive chairman); Raj Subramaniam (president & CEO)
- Services: Business services; Express delivery; Freight transportation; Logistics services
- Revenue: ▲US$94.70 billion (2026)
- Operating income: ▲US$5.46 billion (2026)
- Net income: ▲US$4.43 billion (2026)
- Total assets: ▲US$91.77 billion (2026)
- Total equity: ▲US$31.65 billion (2026)
- Number of employees: ▼452,000 (May 31, 2026)
- Subsidiaries: FedEx Custom Critical; FedEx Express; FedEx Ground; FedEx Logistics; FedEx Office; FedEx Services; FedEx Supply Chain; FedEx Trade Networks
- Website: www.fedex.com

FedEx Corporation is an American multinational transportation, e-commerce, and business-services company headquartered in Memphis, Tennessee. Founded in 1971 by Frederick W. Smith as Federal Express Corporation, it began operations in 1973 as an express delivery company centered on an air-and-ground network based at Memphis International Airport. FedEx now provides parcel delivery, express transportation, freight forwarding, logistics, customs brokerage, supply-chain services, and retail printing and shipping services worldwide. In fiscal 2026, the company reported revenue of $94.7 billion and employed about 452,000 people.

Federal Express expanded rapidly during its first decades, entering European and Asian markets in the 1980s and acquiring cargo airline Flying Tiger Line in 1988. The company adopted the abbreviated name FedEx for marketing purposes in 1994. In 1997 it reorganized as the holding company FDX Corporation and acquired Caliber System, adding ground parcel delivery, freight, logistics, and other services to its express-delivery business. FDX was renamed FedEx Corporation in 2000. Later acquisitions included Kinko's, which became FedEx Office, and European delivery company TNT Express. In the 2020s FedEx began another major restructuring, combining its air and ground delivery operations and spinning off FedEx Freight as a separate publicly traded company in June 2026.

The company's principal businesses include FedEx Express, its original time-definite air-delivery operation; ground parcel delivery; FedEx Logistics, which provides freight forwarding, customs brokerage and supply-chain services; and FedEx Office, its retail printing and shipping business. FedEx operates a large global network of aircraft and ground vehicles. Its purple-and-orange wordmark, introduced in 1994, is known for the arrow formed by the negative space between the letters E and x.

FedEx has also faced disputes over its labor practices and business operations. These have included litigation and regulatory scrutiny over the classification of FedEx Ground drivers as independent contractors, controversy over unionization, and criticism of employee protections during the COVID-19 pandemic. In 2014 the company was indicted on allegations that it had knowingly shipped controlled substances for illegal online pharmacies; the Department of Justice dropped the charges in 2016. FedEx was also investigated by Chinese authorities in 2019 after packages belonging to Huawei were diverted to the United States. The company has pledged to make its operations carbon-neutral by 2040, including through fleet electrification and other emissions-reduction measures.

== History ==
=== Foundation and early history ===
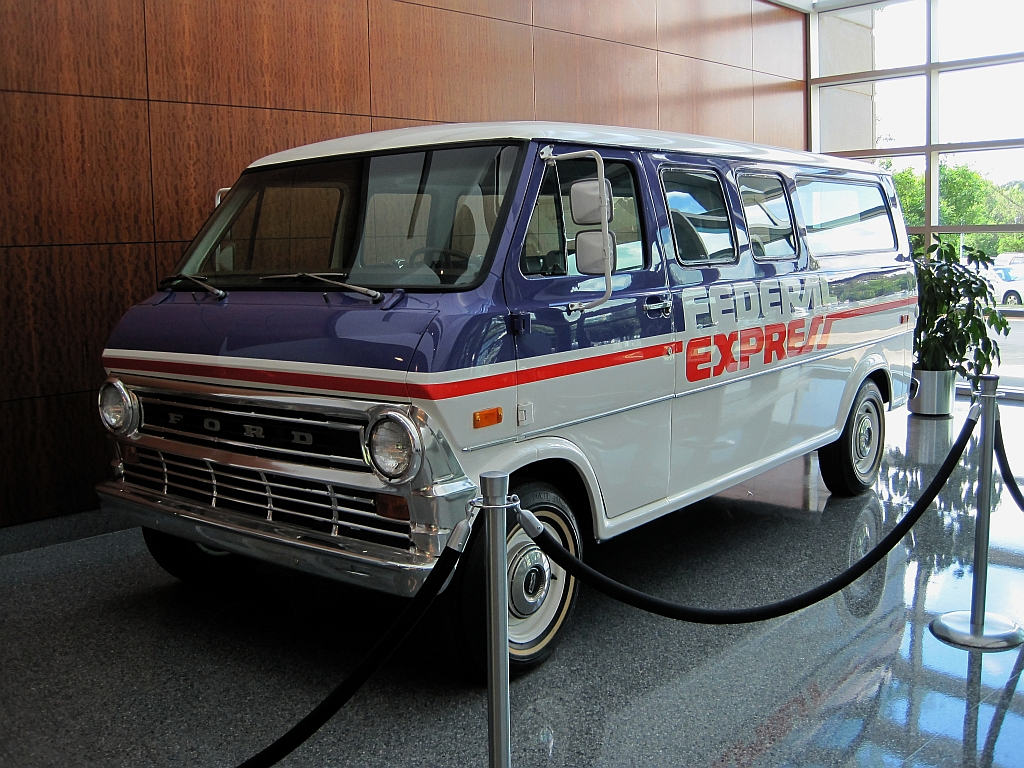
FedEx's first van displayed at the FedEx World Headquarters

In 1971, the company was founded in Little Rock, Arkansas, as Federal Express Corporation by Frederick W. Smith, a graduate of Yale University. He drew up the company's concept in a term paper at Yale, in which he called for a system specifically designed for urgent deliveries. While his professor did not think much of the idea, Smith pressed on. He began formal operations in 1973, when he moved operations to Memphis. Smith said he chose Memphis International Airport for being near the mean population center of the country and for its placid weather.

The company grew rapidly, and by 1983 had a billion dollars in revenue, a rarity for a startup company that had never taken part in mergers or acquisitions in its first decade. It expanded to Europe and Asia in 1984. In 1988, it acquired one of its major competitors, Flying Tiger Line, creating the largest full-service cargo airline in the world. In 1994, Federal Express shortened its name to "FedEx" for marketing purposes, officially adopting a nickname that had been used for years.

=== Reorganization and Caliber acquisition ===
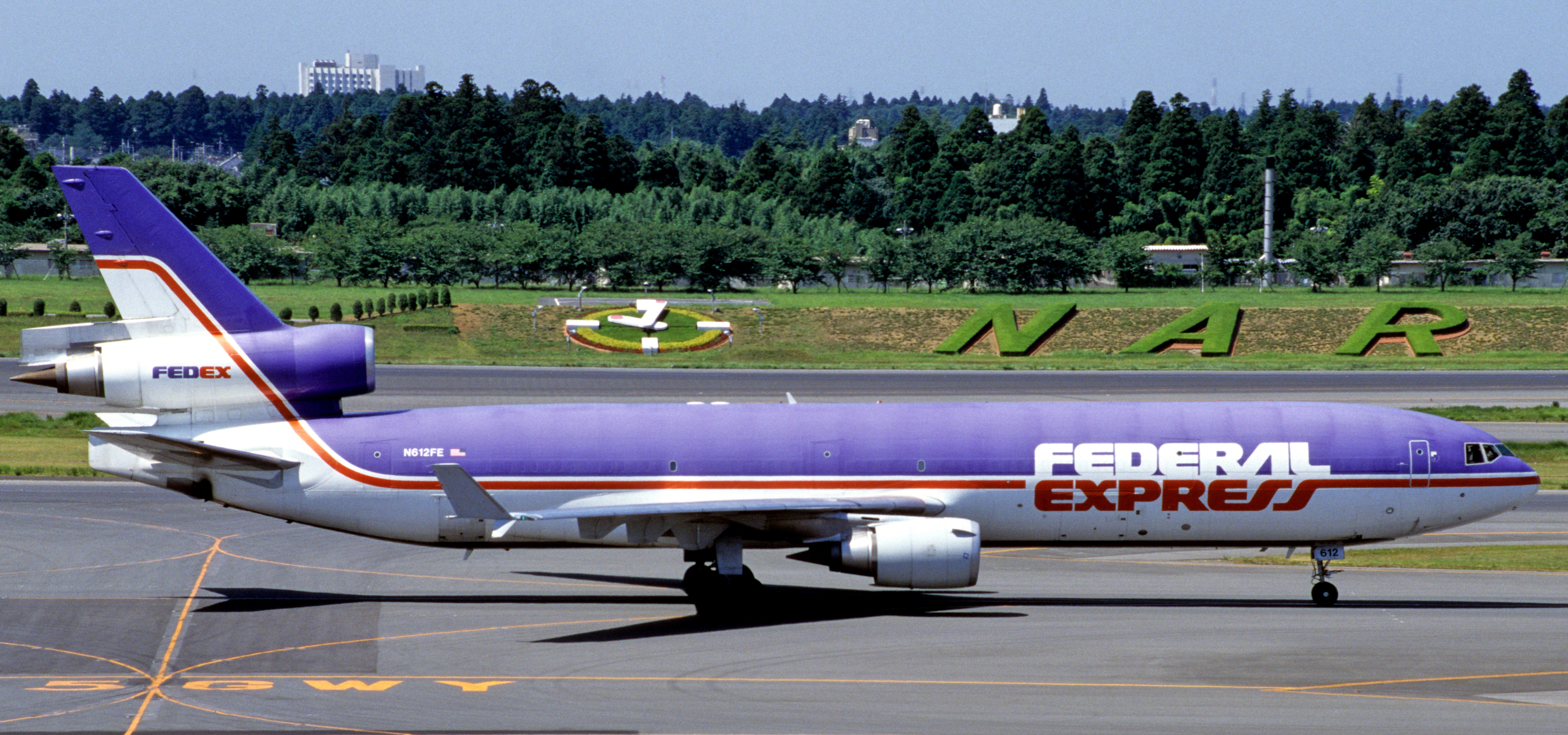
A Federal Express McDonnell Douglas MD-11 at Narita International Airport in 1995

On October 2, 1997, FedEx reorganized as a holding company, FDX Corporation, a Delaware corporation. The new holding company began operations in January 1998, with the acquisition of Caliber System Inc. by Federal Express. With the purchase of Caliber, FedEx started offering other services besides express shipping. Caliber subsidiaries included RPS, a small-package ground service; Roberts Express, an expedited shipping provider; Viking Freight, a regional, less-than-truckload freight carrier serving the Western United States; Caribbean Transportation Services, a provider of airfreight forwarding between the United States and the Caribbean; and Caliber Logistics and Caliber Technology, providers of logistics and technology services. FDX Corporation was founded to oversee all of the operations of those companies and its original air division, Federal Express.

In January 2000, FDX Corporation changed its name to FedEx Corporation and re-branded all of its subsidiaries. Federal Express became FedEx Express, RPS became FedEx Ground, Roberts Express became FedEx Custom Critical, and Caliber Logistics and Caliber Technology were combined to comprise FedEx Global Logistics. A new subsidiary, called FedEx Corporate Services, was formed to centralize the sales, marketing, and customer service for all of the subsidiaries. In February 2000, FedEx acquired Tower Group International, an international logistics company. FedEx also acquired WorldTariff, a customs duty and tax information company; TowerGroup and WorldTariff were re-branded to form FedEx Trade Networks.

=== 21st century ===
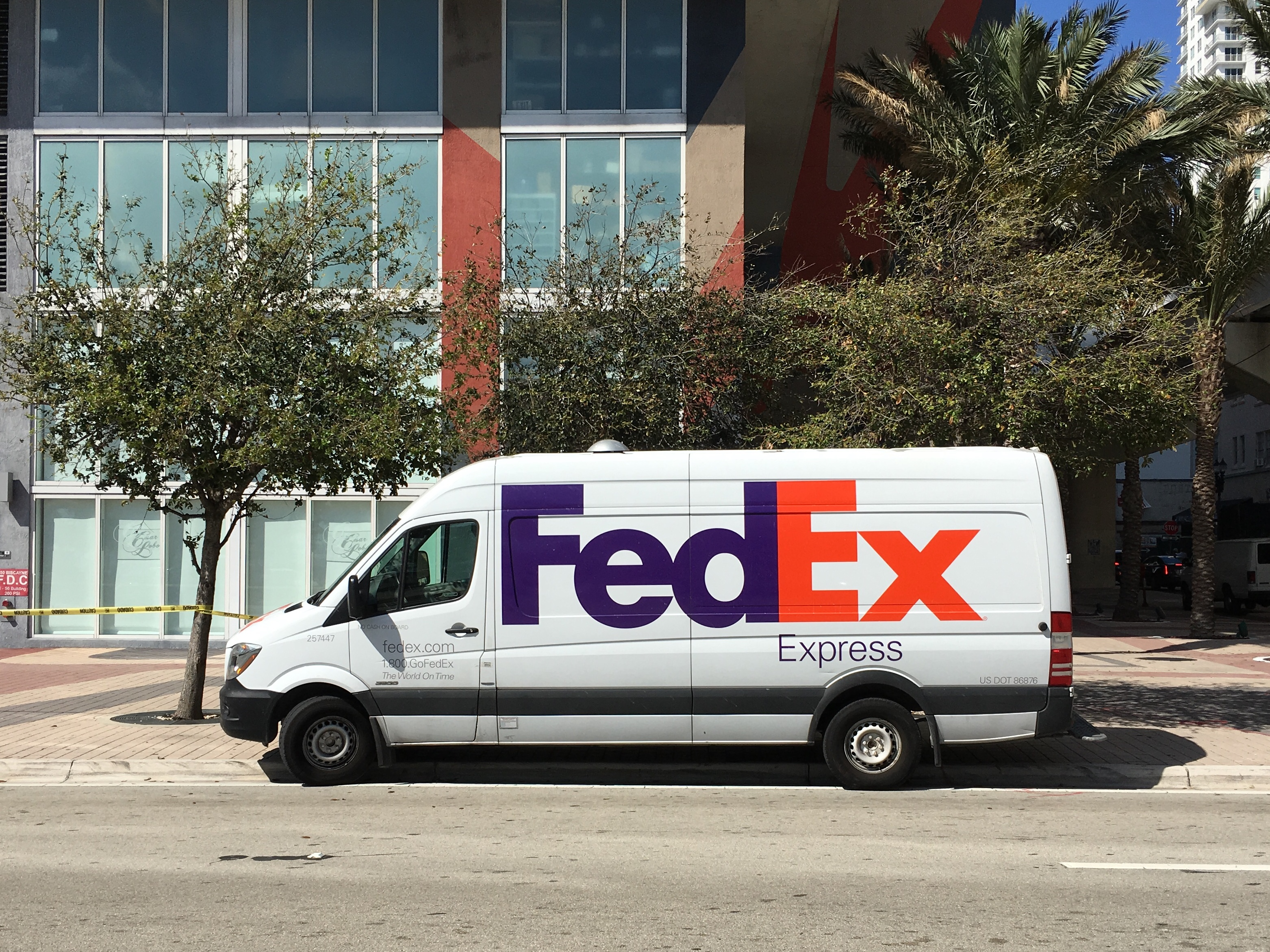
FedEx Express delivery van in Miami

FedEx Corp. acquired privately held Kinko's, Inc. in February 2004 and re-branded it FedEx Kinko's. The acquisition was made to expand FedEx's retail access to the general public. After the acquisition, all FedEx Kinko's locations offered only FedEx shipping. In June 2008, FedEx announced that they would be dropping the Kinko's name from their ship centers; FedEx Kinko's would now be called FedEx Office. In September 2004, FedEx acquired Parcel Direct, a parcel consolidator, and re-branded it FedEx SmartPost.

In April 2015, FedEx acquired its rival firm TNT Express for €4.4 billion ($4.8 billion; £3.2 billion) as it looked to expand its operations in Europe.

In February 2016, FedEx announced the launch of FedEx Cares, a global giving platform, and committed to invest $200 million to strengthen more than 200 communities by 2020.

In March 2018, FedEx announced the acquisition of P2P Mailing Limited, a last-mile delivery service, for £92 million to expand their portfolio.

FedEx terminated its partnership with the National Rifle Association of America in October 2018 under pressure from activists.

In June 2019, FedEx announced it would not be renewing its $850 million contract with Amazon for the company's U.S. domestic express delivery business. Amazon accounted for 1.3 percent of 2018 revenues. In August 2019, FedEx announced the termination of ground deliveries for Amazon as well.

In December 2020, FedEx acquired ShopRunner, an e-commerce platform.

On March 29, 2022, founder Frederick W. Smith announced he would be retiring as CEO and would become executive chairman effective June 1, 2022. The company named Raj Subramaniam, FedEx's current president and COO, as Smith's successor.

In April 2023, FedEx announced plans to consolidate its operating companies into a single organization. In June 2024, FedEx Ground and FedEx Services were merged into Federal Express, creating a unified air-ground delivery network as part of the company's Network 2.0 restructuring.

In December 2024, FedEx announced plans to separate FedEx Freight from the company, creating two independent publicly traded companies. In June 2026, FedEx completed the spin-off, making FedEx Freight focused on the North American less-than-truckload market.

=== Spin-off of freight truck business ===
As of June 1, 2026, FedEx Freight announced the completion of its spin-off from FedEx Corporation, establishing the company as an independent, publicly traded company. FedEx Freight common stock began trading on the New York Stock Exchange under the ticker symbol “FDXF.”

== Operating units ==
FedEx Corporation divides its business into the following main operating units:

=== FedEx Express ===
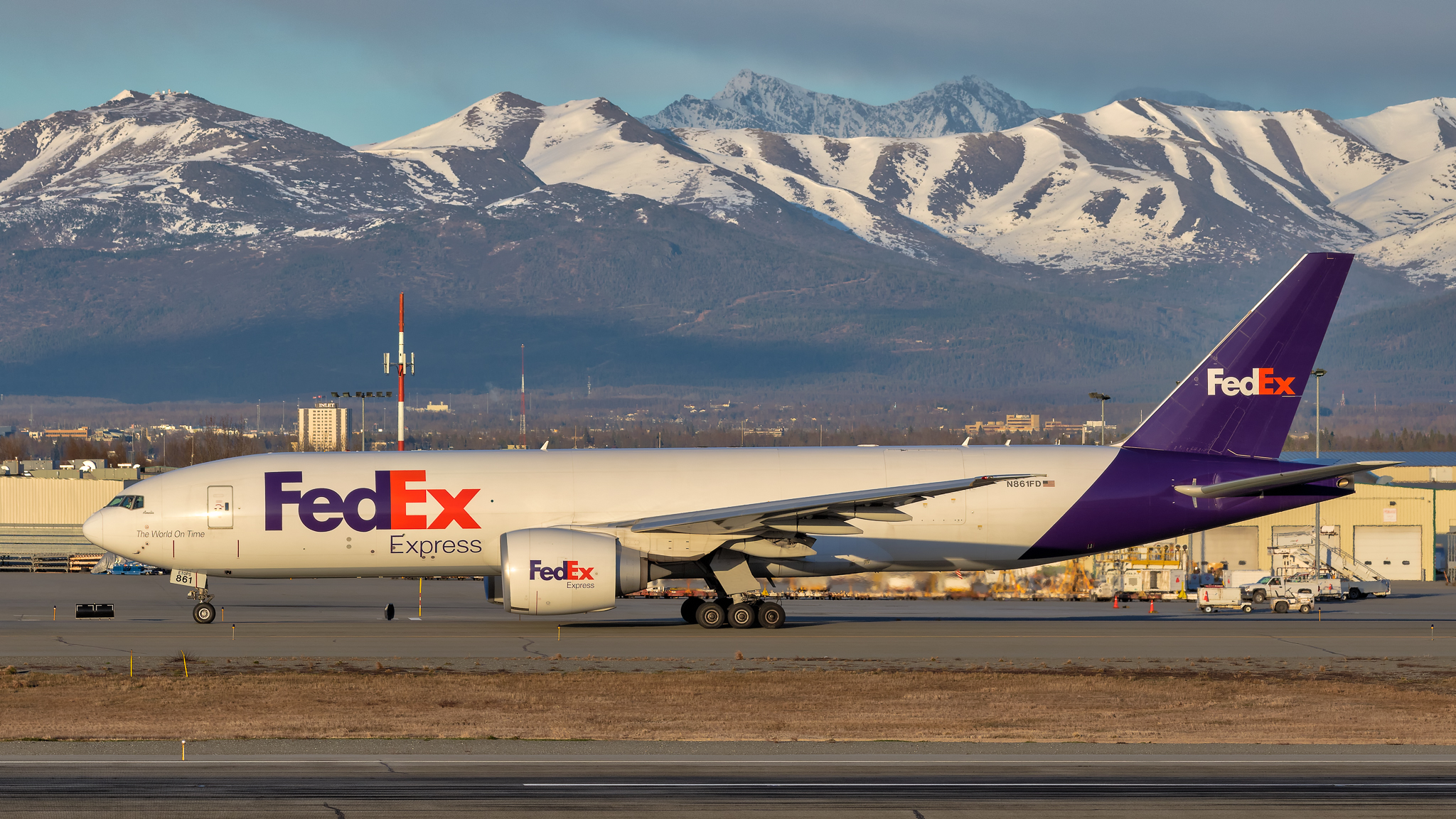
FedEx Express Boeing 777F

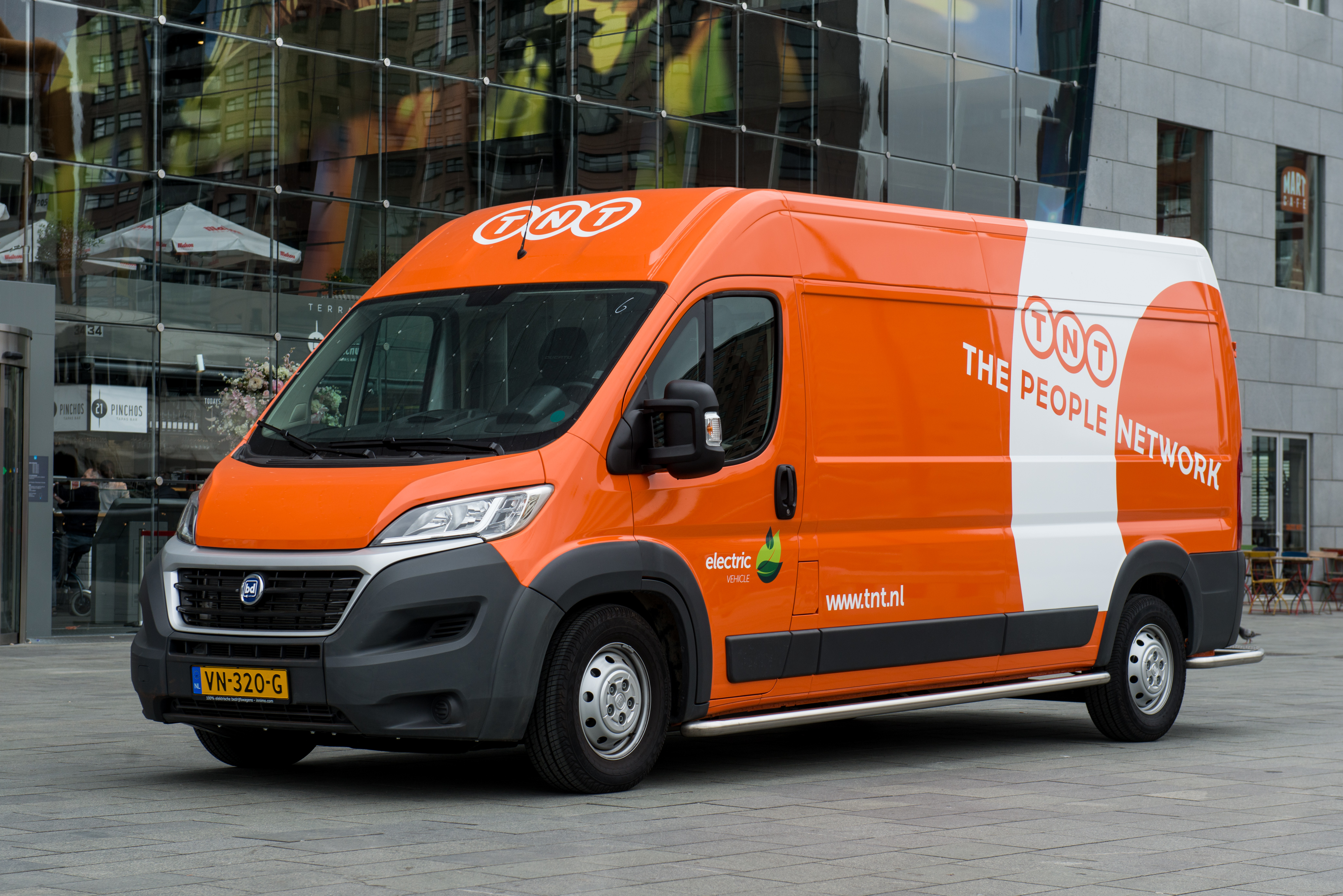
TNT Express electric van in Europe

FedEx Express is the company's original overnight courier service, providing next day air service within the US and time-definite international service. It operates one of the largest civil aircraft fleets in the world, which has the largest fleet of wide bodied civil aircraft, and carries more freight than any other airline. Included in this unit are:

- Caribbean Transport Services: Until 2008, part of FedEx Freight. Provides airfreight forwarding services between the US mainland, Puerto Rico, and other Caribbean destinations.
- TNT Express: Formerly an independent international courier delivery company headquartered in Hoofddorp, Netherlands, now a subsidiary of FedEx. It has fully owned operations in 61 countries, and delivers documents, parcels, and freight to over two hundred countries.
- FedEx Custom Critical: Delivers urgent, valuable, or hazardous items using trucks and chartered aircraft. Drivers are independent owner/operators and services in Mexico use interline carriers. Formerly Roberts Express, a subsidiary of Caliber System.
- FedEx Cross Border: Provides information services, compliance management, and currency conversion services for cross-border retailers. Formerly Bongo International.

=== FedEx Ground ===
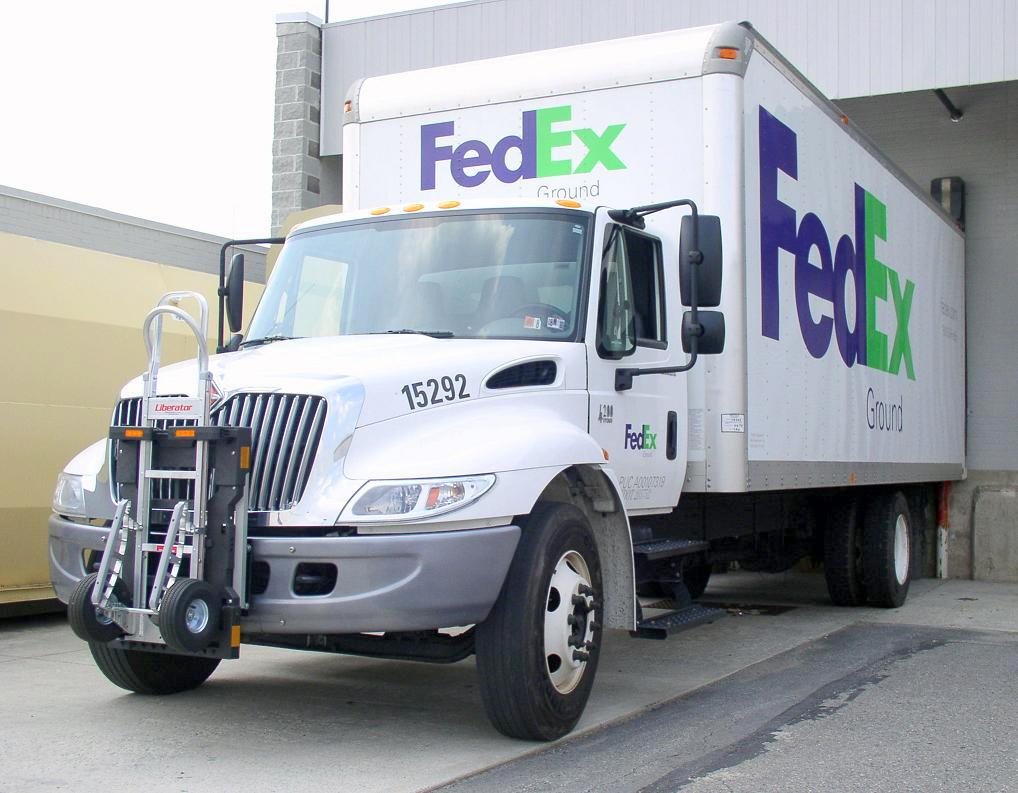
FedEx Ground delivery truck

FedEx Ground provides day-definite mail and package delivery to commercial locations in the US and Canada and residential locations in Canada. Its services are cheaper than the time-definite services offered by FedEx Express. The company was formerly Roadway Package System (RPS), a division of Caliber System. The unit also includes:

- FedEx Home Delivery: Provides domestic residential delivery services on an expanded schedule better suited to personal deliveries. Operates only in the US; residential deliveries in Canada are provided by FedEx Ground. The service's logo includes a drawing of a dog carrying a package.
- FedEx Ground Economy (formerly FedEx SmartPost): Consolidates parcels from merchants such as e-commerce and catalog companies, transports them in bulk between its hubs, and uses FedEx Ground or Home Delivery for final mile delivery. Formerly Parcel Direct, a subsidiary of catalog publisher Quad Graphics, acquired by FedEx in 2004.

=== FedEx Freight ===
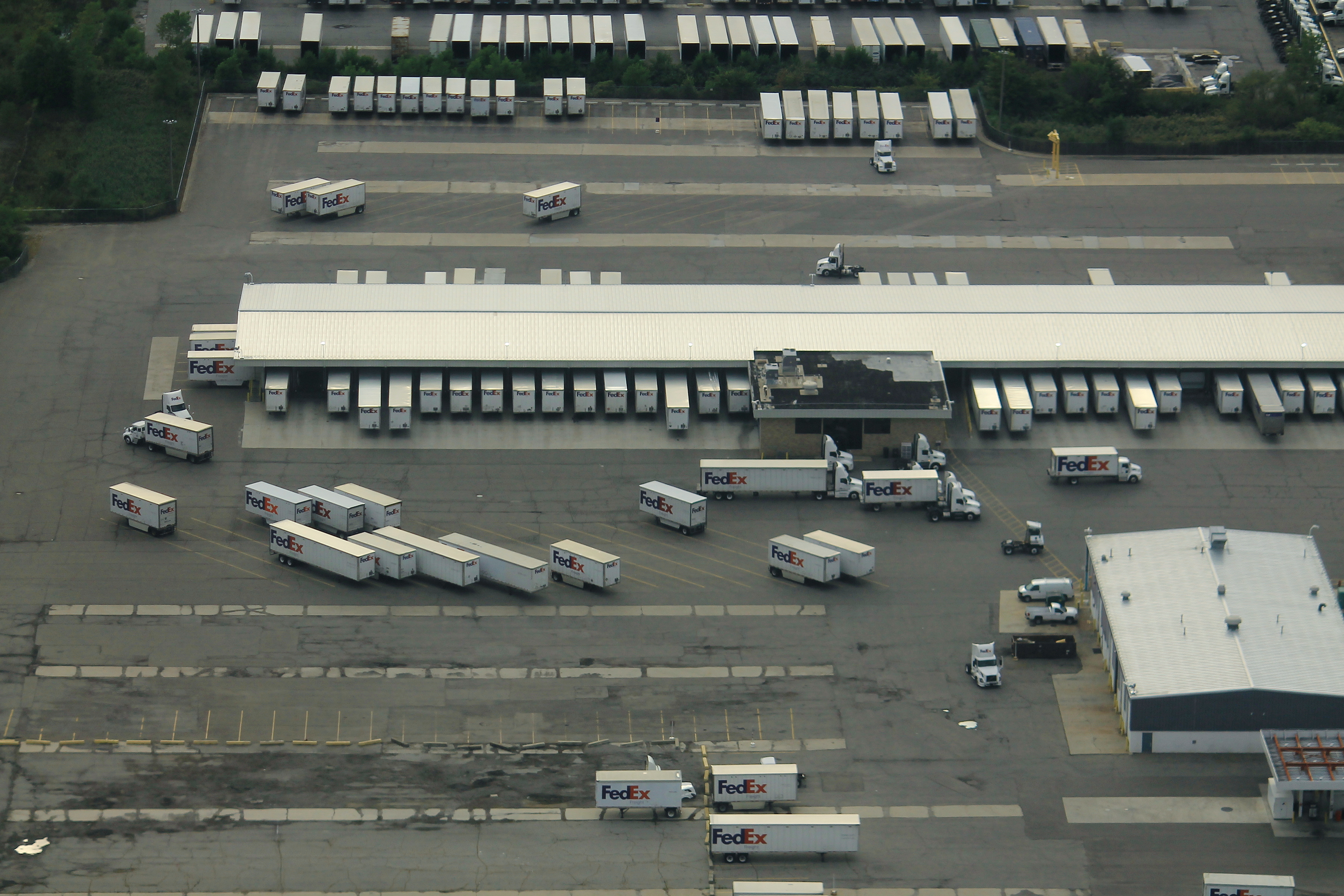
FedEx Freight hub in Detroit

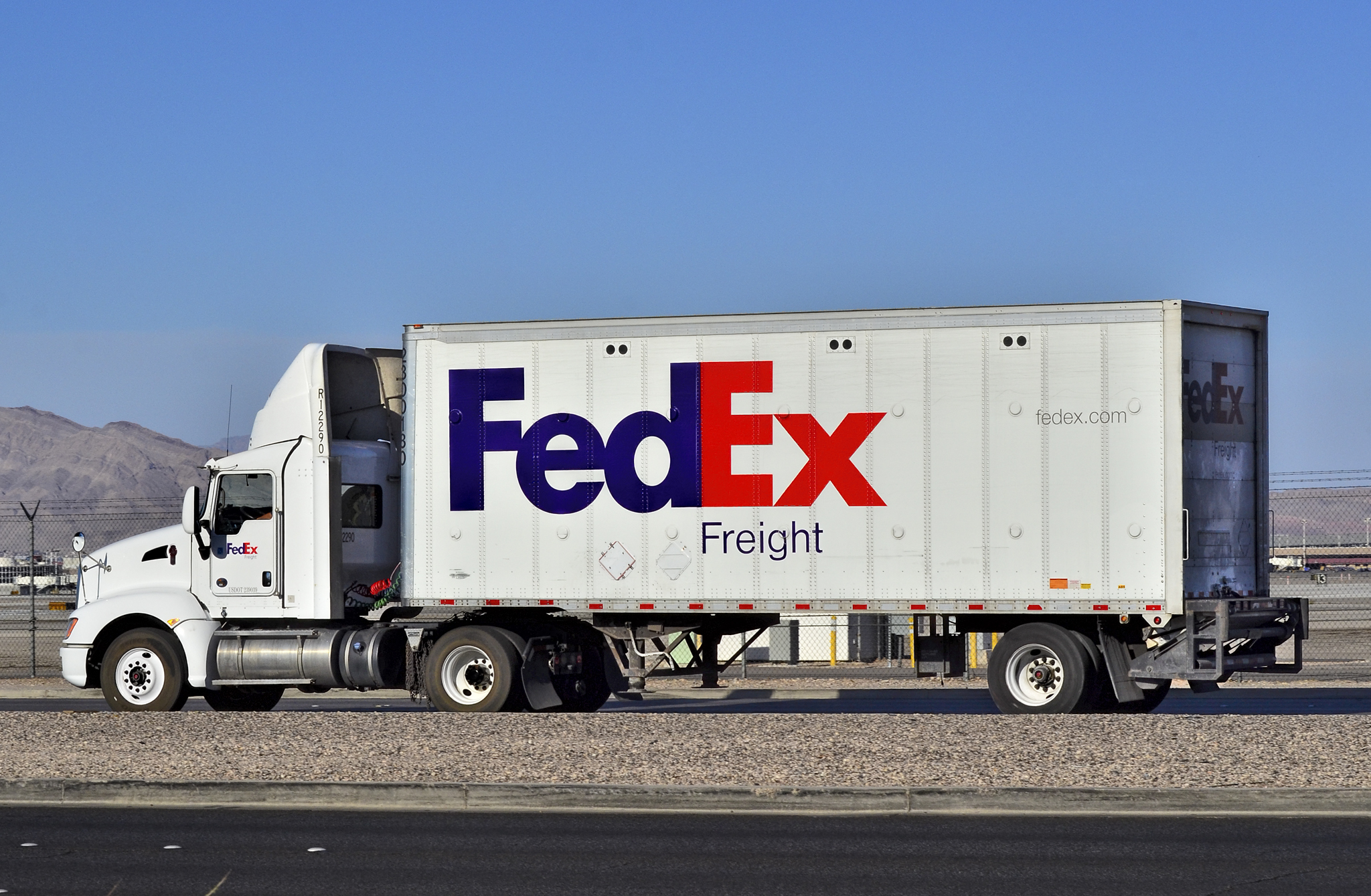
FedEx Freight truck in Las Vegas

FedEx Freight, consisting of 365+ locations, 26,000+ doors and 30,000+ vehicles, became a distinct business entity on June 1, 2026. FedEx Freight is the largest less-than-truckload (LTL) freight carrier in the US, reporting US$8.9 billion in revenue for 2021, and operates LTL and other freight services in the US and Canada. The unit was formed in 2002 when FedEx bought regional US LTL carrier American Freightways (AF) and established FedEx Freight as a parent company for AF, renamed FedEx Freight East, and FedEx's existing regional LTL subsidiary, Viking Freight, renamed FedEx Freight West. Viking had been a Caliber subsidiary when Caliber was acquired by FedEx in 1998. FedEx bought Lakeland, Florida-based national LTL carrier Watkins Motor Lines in 2006 and renamed it FedEx National LTL. All three operated as independent subsidiaries of FedEx Freight until January 2010 when they were merged with their parent to form a single entity, FedEx Freight Inc. The unit is the parent of:

- FedEx Freight Canada: Formerly Watkins Canada Express, the Canadian services of Watkins Motor Lines.

=== FedEx Logistics ===
FedEx Logistics provides supply chain, specialty transportation, cross-border e-commerce, customs brokerage, and trade management technology and services. The division was known as FedEx Trade Networks until January 2019 and is composed of several FedEx acquisitions as well as the operations of former Caliber subsidiaries Caliber Logistics and Caliber Technology. Divisions include:

- FedEx Air and Ocean Cargo Networks: International air and ocean freight forwarding. Formerly C.J. Tower & Sons, TowerGroup International Inc. (acquired by FedEx in 2000), and FedEx Trade Networks Transport & Brokerage, Inc.
- FedEx Customs Brokerage: Customs and international trade compliance services. Formerly World Tariff, Ltd. (acquired by FedEx in 2000) and FedEx Trade Networks Trade Services, Inc.
- FedEx Forward Depots: Critical inventory and service parts logistics. Also includes the TechConnect business equipment repair and refurbishment facilities, 3D printing services, and the FedEx Packaging Lab.
- FedEx Supply Chain: Third-party logistics including transportation management, warehousing, fulfillment, and returns. Formerly GENCO.

=== FedEx Office ===
FedEx Office is the retail arm of the corporation offering print and photocopy services, business services including signage and marketing, and retail sales of FedEx shipping services. The unit also included FedEx SameDay City, a same-day delivery service. FedEx Office was formerly an independent company, Kinko's, until it was acquired by FedEx in 2004 and rebranded as FedEx Kinko's. It was again rebranded in June 2008, becoming FedEx Office. Its divisions include:

- FedEx Office Print and Ship Centers: Successor to the original Kinko's operations. Also provide FedEx Hold at Location services, where a package can be delivered to and held at a FedEx Office location for later pickup by the receiver. FedEx Office also operates its own courier network for location-to-location and local delivery. Includes some locations previously called FedEx World Service Centers, which predated FedEx's Kinko's acquisition.
- FedEx SameDay City: Same-day delivery courier providing Standard, pickup by noon and delivered by the end of the day, and Priority, delivery within two hours, services. Discontinued in 2023.

== Fleet ==
FedEx operates many different types of vehicles to deliver packages. They operate planes, trucks, vans and drones. According to the FedEx website, the company has over 210,000 motorized vehicles.

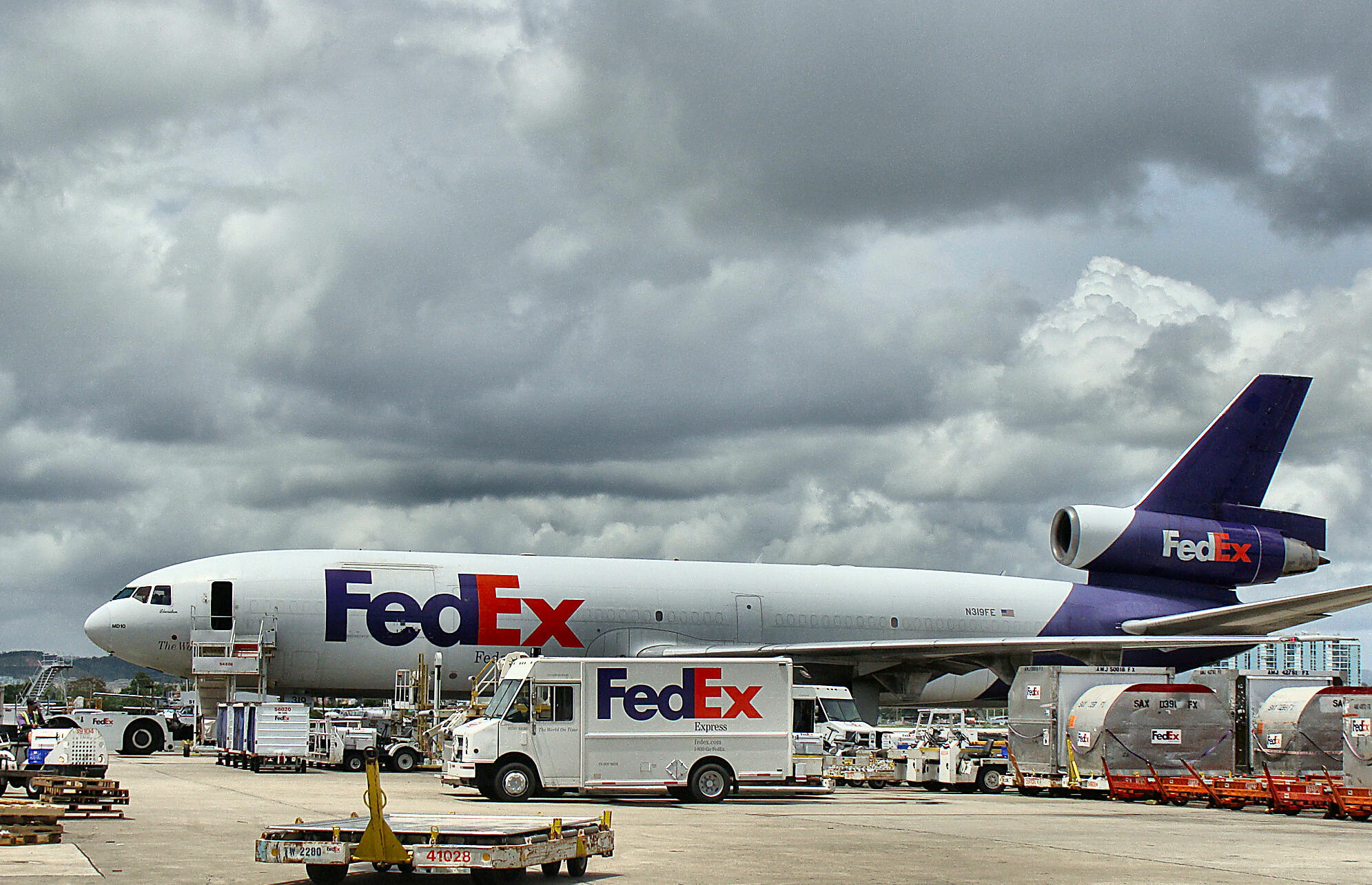
FedEx McDonnell Douglas DC-10

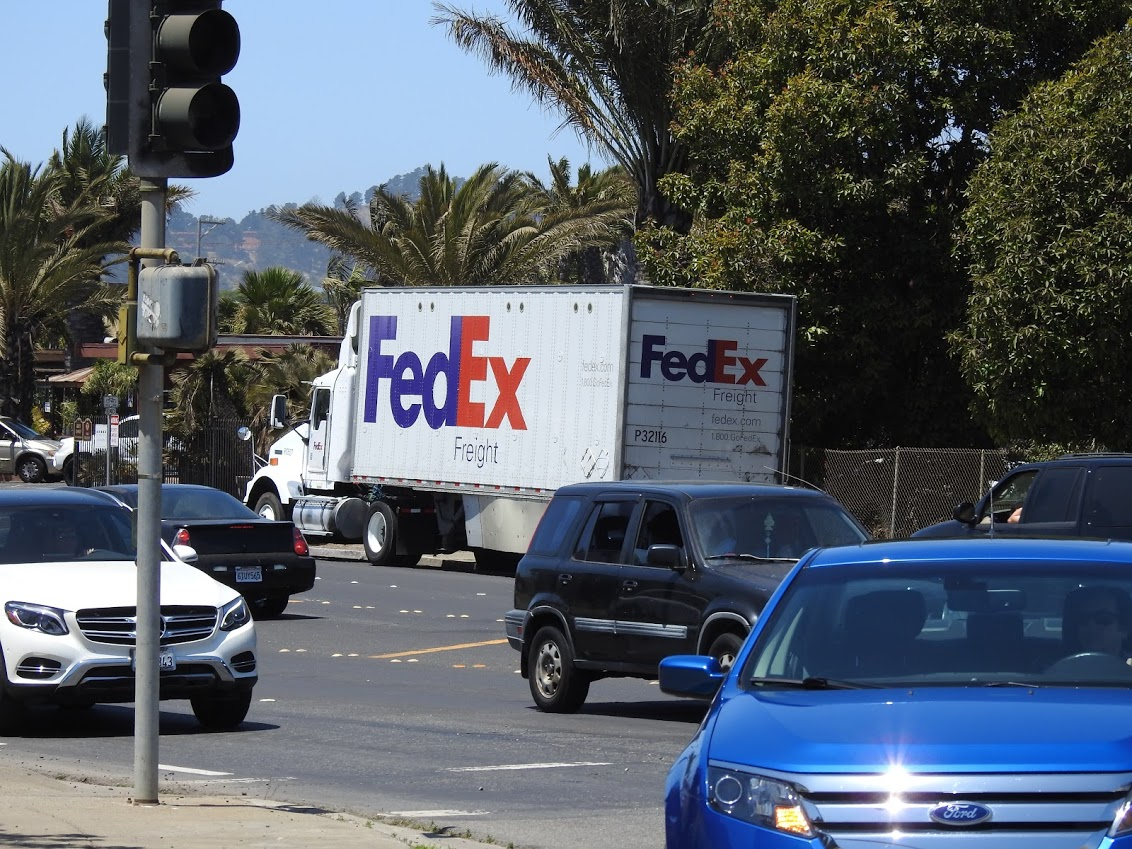
A FedEx truck in the United States

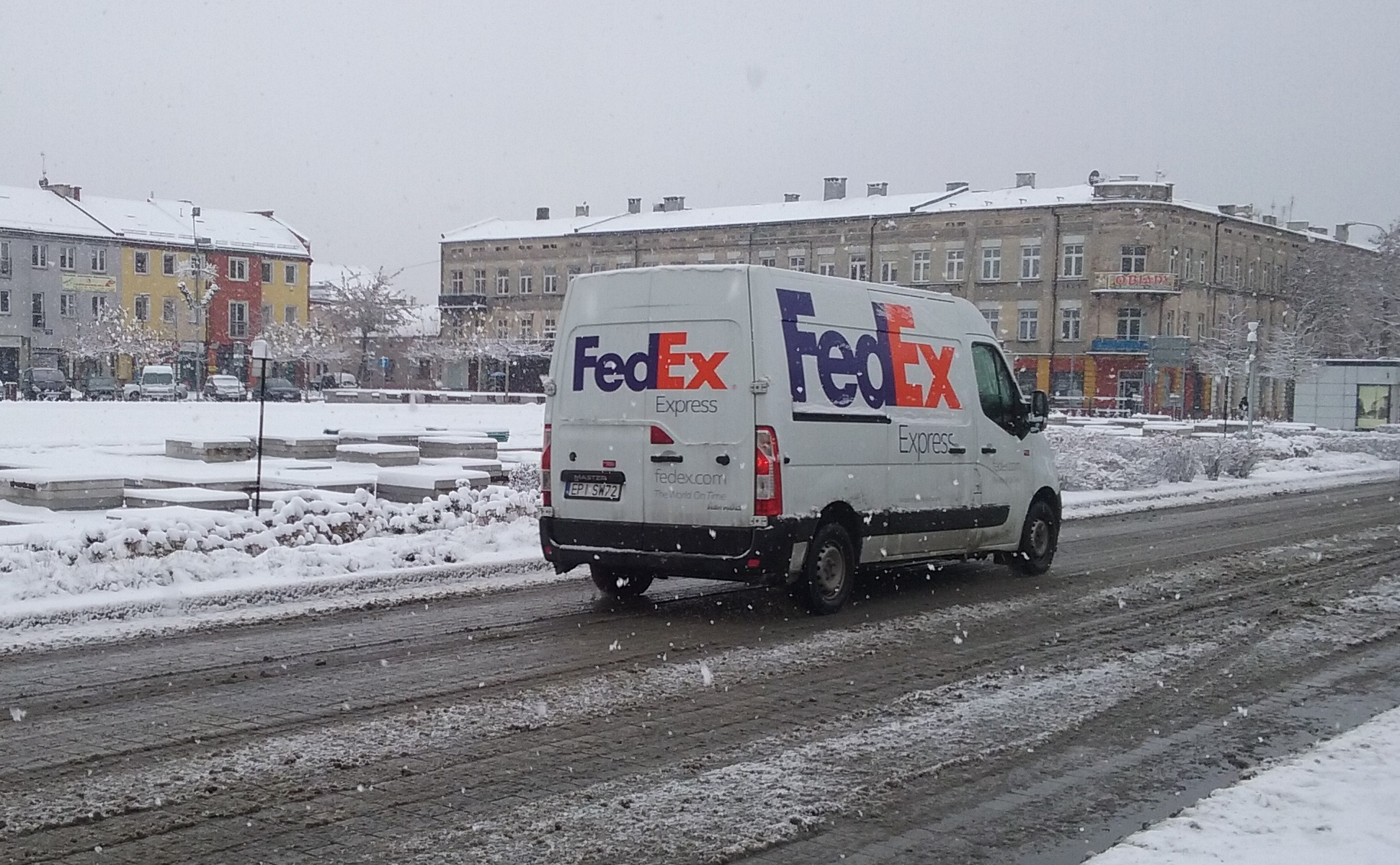
A FedEx van in Poland

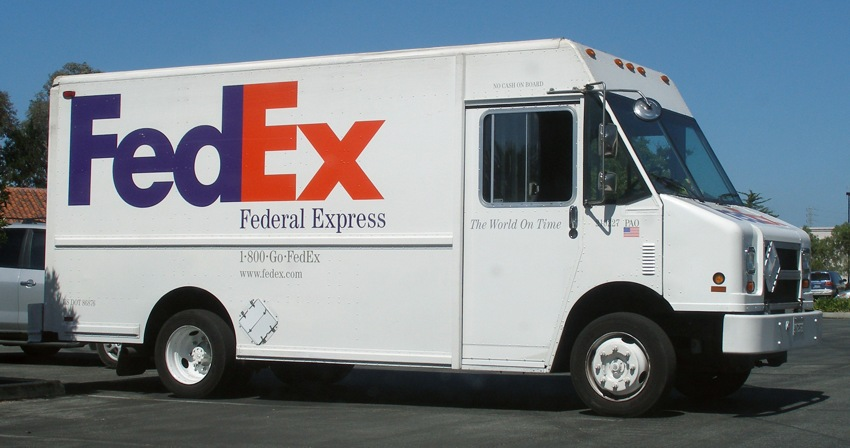
An older FedEx truck

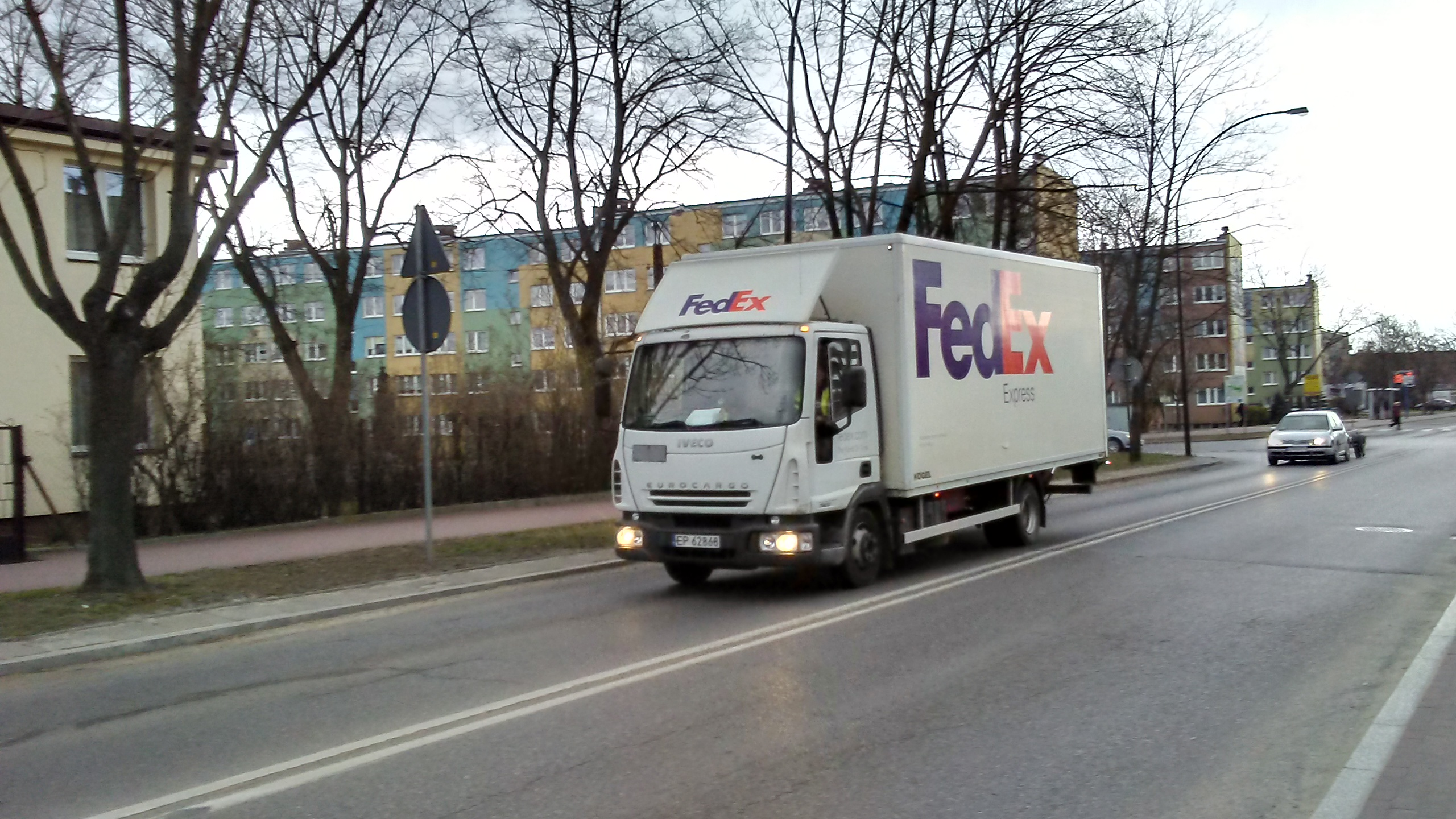
A FedEx truck in Poland

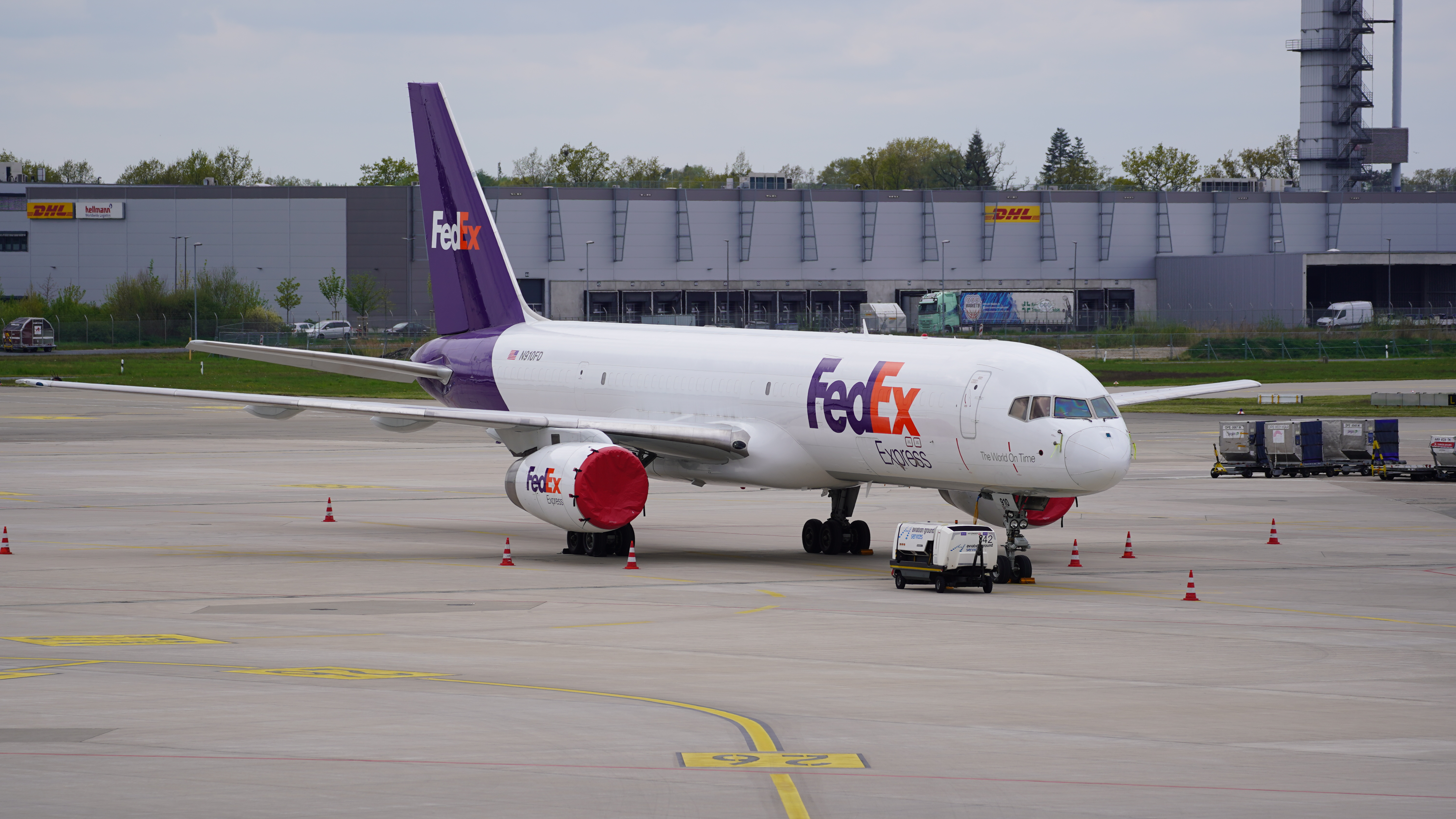
A FedEx Boeing 757 at Hannover Airport

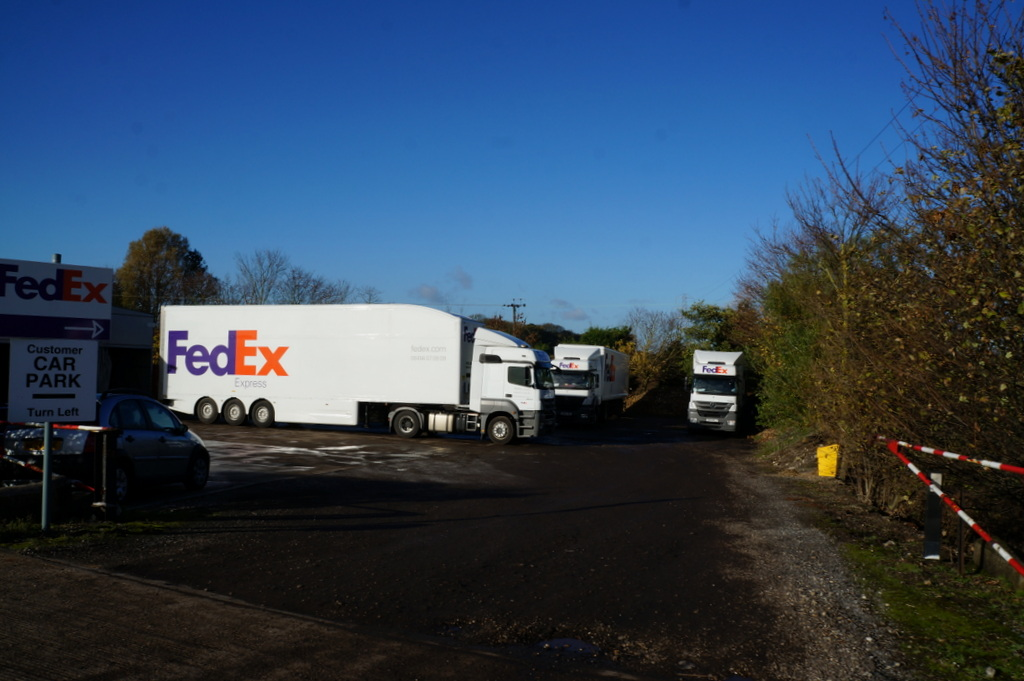
FedEx truck at a FedEx depot in the UK

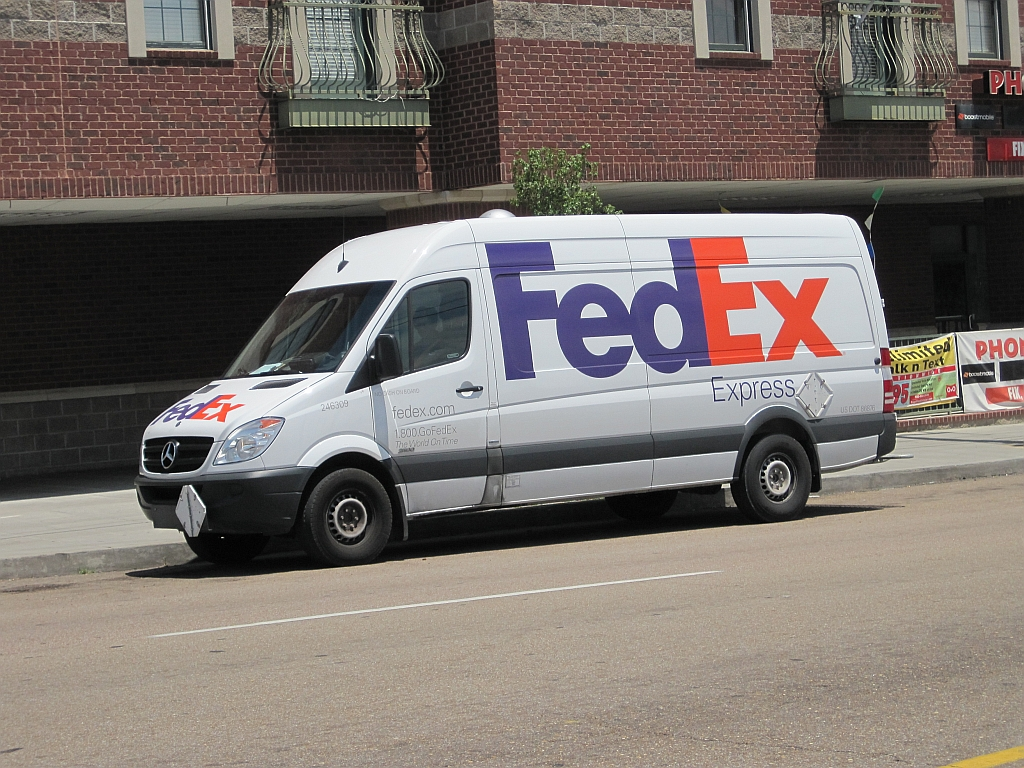
A FedEx Mercedes Sprinter in Memphis, TN

== Corporate identity ==
=== Logo ===

The FedEx logo is a wordmark designed in 1994 by Lindon Leader of Landor Associates, of San Francisco. It consists of Fed in purple and Ex in orange. The FedEx wordmark is notable for containing a subliminal right-pointing arrow in the negative space between the "E" and the "X", which was achieved by designing a proprietary typeface, based on Univers and Futura, to emphasize the arrow shape. Leader believed the logo promoted FedEx as "getting from point A to point B reliably with speed and precision".

Former logo Ex color by operating unit
| Unit | Color |
|---|---|
| FedEx Express | Orange |
| FedEx Custom Critical | Blue then Red |
| FedEx Ground | Green |
| FedEx Freight | Red |
| FedEx Logistics | Platinum |
| FedEx Services | Platinum |
| FedEx Office | Blue |
| FedEx SameDay City | Platinum |

In the early 2000s, the Ex was in a different color for each division and platinum for the overall corporation use. However, in August 2016, FedEx announced that all operating units would adopt the purple and orange color logo over the next five years (the same as the original FedEx logo, and later used by FedEx Express).

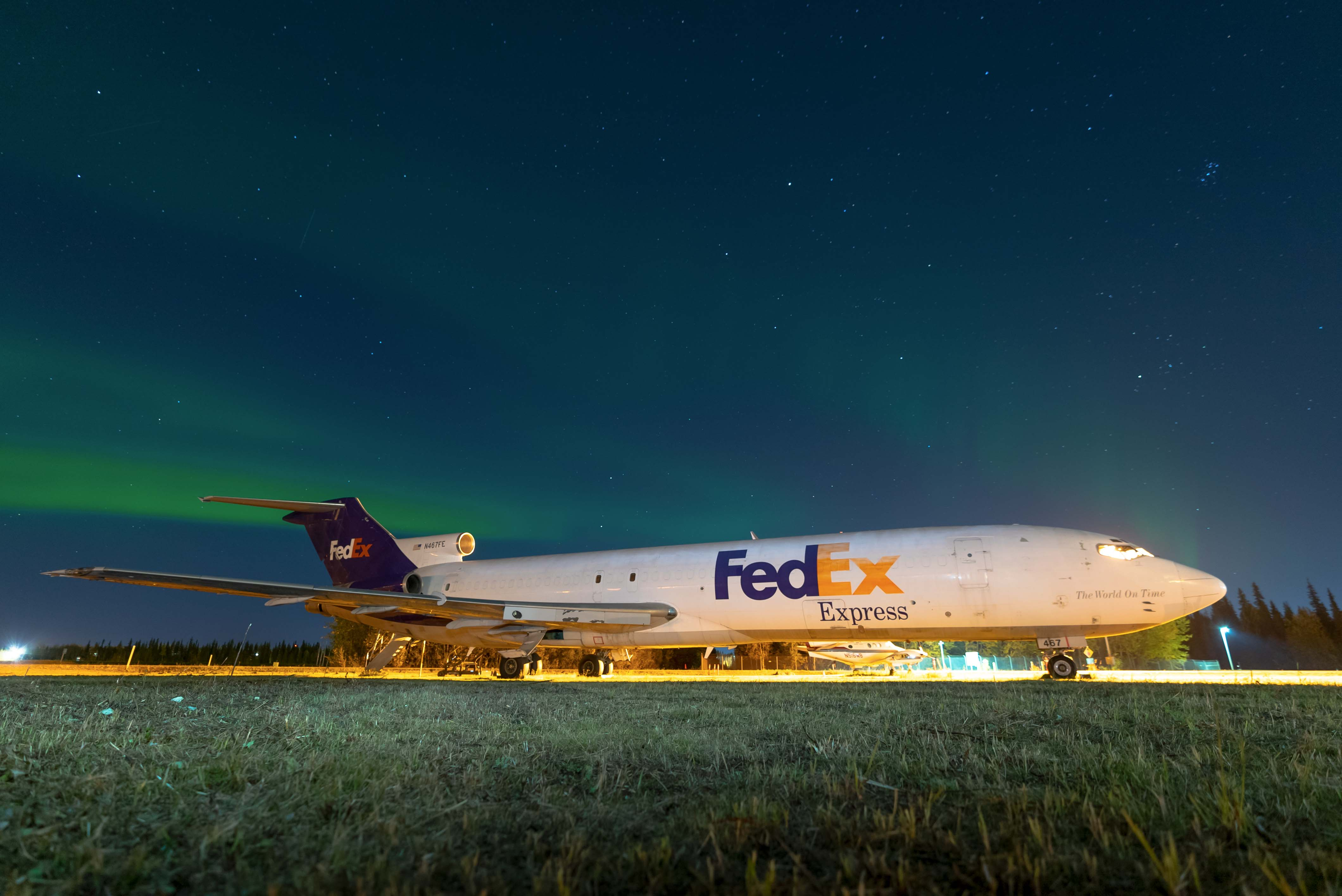
A FedEx Express Boeing 727 parked at Fairbanks International Airport. It was donated to the University of Alaska Fairbanks

=== In popular culture ===
For the Cast Away film, FedEx provided access to their facilities (Memphis, Los Angeles, and Moscow) as well as airplanes, trucks, uniforms, and logistical support. A team of FedEx marketers oversaw production through more than two years of filming. FedEx CEO Fred Smith made an appearance as himself for the scene where Chuck is welcomed back, which was filmed on location at FedEx's home facilities in Memphis, Tennessee. The idea of a story based on a FedEx plane crashing gave the company "a heart attack at first," but the overall story was seen as positive. FedEx, which paid no money for product placement in the film, saw an increase in brand awareness in Asia and Europe following the film's release.

=== Sponsorships ===
==== Motorsports ====
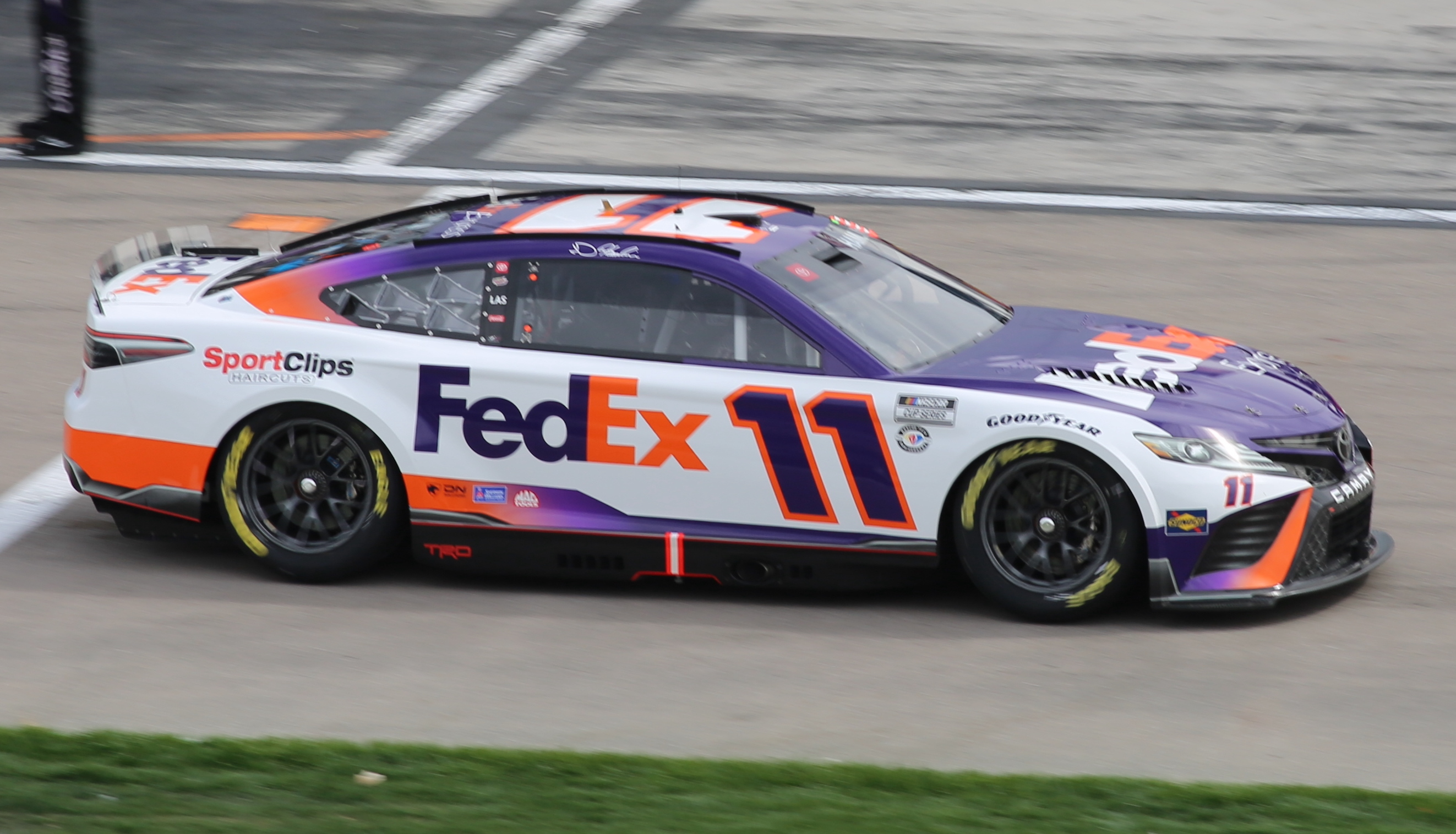
The FedEx-sponsored No. 11 car at the 2023 Pennzoil 400, driven by Denny Hamlin

- From 1997 to 2002, FedEx was the title sponsor of Champ Car World Series when it was known as CART. The series was known as the "CART FedEx Championship Series", which led to the official "Champ Car" designation in reference to the fact that they were the FedEx Championship.
- From 2005 to 2024, FedEx was the primary sponsor of the No. 11 NASCAR Cup Series Toyota, owned by Joe Gibbs Racing. At the end of the 2024 season, it was announced that FedEx would not return to JGR in 2025, after 20 years of sponsoring the No. 11. The car had been driven by Jason Leffler and later Denny Hamlin, who drove the car for 19 years, winning 47 races together including three Daytona 500's in 2016, 2019, and in 2020, one Coca-Cola 600, and a Southern 500 together.
- FedEx previously sponsored the Formula One teams Benetton (1996–1999), Ferrari (1999–2001), Williams F1 (2002–2006), and McLaren (2007–2008).

==== Football ====
- From 1989 to 2010, FedEx was the title sponsor of the Orange Bowl, played in Miami, Florida.
- From 1999 to 2024, FedEx held the naming rights to the home of the National Football League's Washington Commanders in Landover, Maryland, which was known as FedExField. They relinquished their sponsorship deal in 2024, and the stadium is now known as Northwest Stadium.

==== Other sports ====
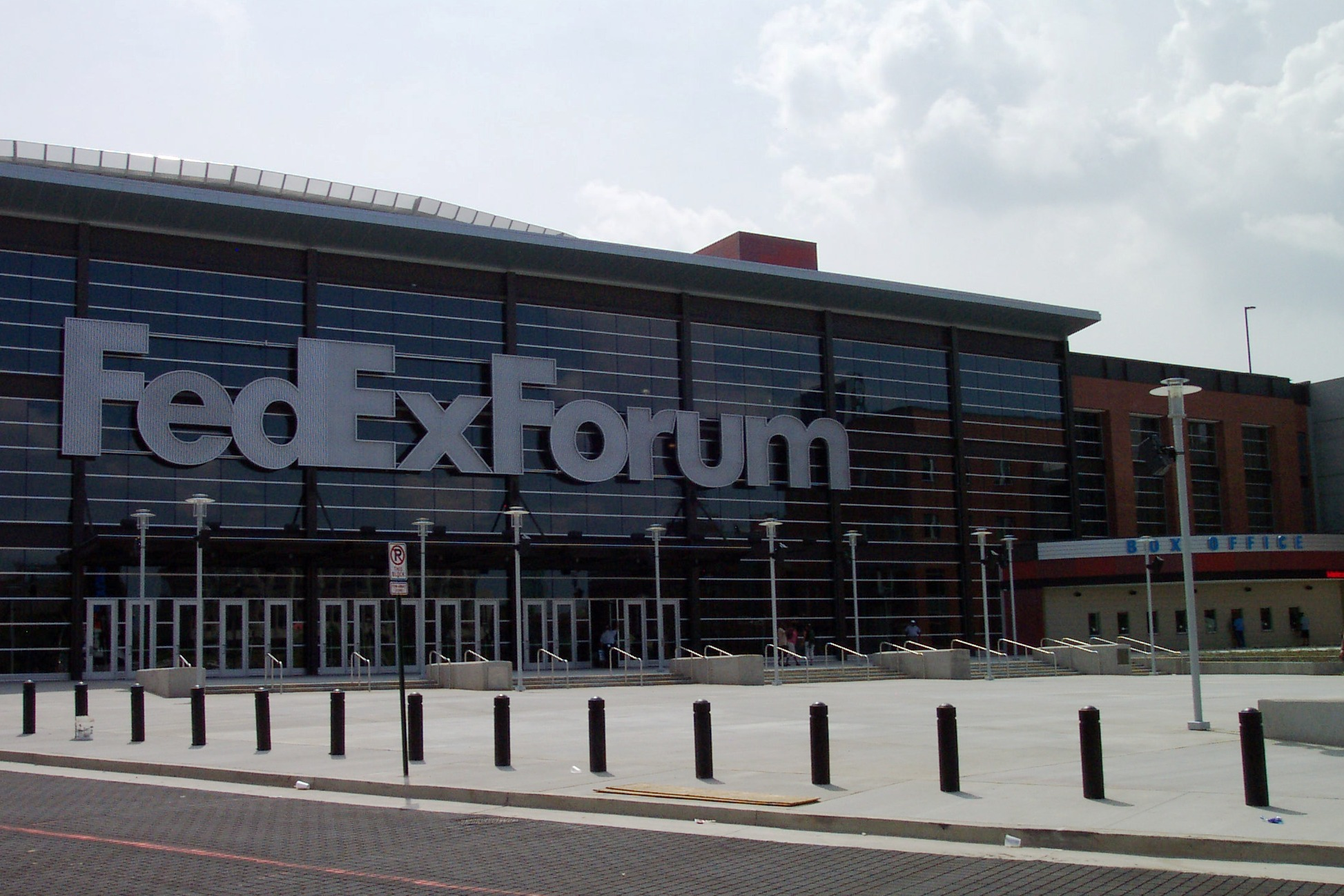
FedExForum in Memphis, Tennessee

- FedEx sponsors FedExForum, home of the NBA's Memphis Grizzlies and the University of Memphis men's basketball team.
- FedEx sponsors the Heineken Cup in rugby for the European markets only.
- Beginning in 2007, FedEx became the title sponsor of the FedEx Cup, a championship trophy for the PGA Tour.
- The WGC-Fedex St. Jude Invitational, a PGA Tour golf tournament and one of the four World Golf Championships held in Memphis, has been sponsored by FedEx from 1986 to 2006, in 2009, and currently since 2011.
- FedEx was the main sponsor of the UEFA Europa League since the 2015–21 cycle outside of the U.S. and Canadian markets.
- FedEx becomes the main global sponsors of the UEFA Champions League and the UEFA Super Cup, UEFA Youth League and the UEFA Futsal Champions League starting in the 2021–24 cycle.

== Corporate affairs ==
=== Board of directors ===
As of July 2025, the FedEx Corporation board of directors is:

- Silvia Davila: Regional president, Danone S.A.
- Marvin Ellison: Chairman, president and CEO, Lowe's Companies, Inc.
- Stephen E. Gorman: Former CEO, Air Methods Corporation
- Tricia Griffith: President and CEO, The Progressive Corporation
- Amy B. Lane: Former Managing Director, Retailing Investment Banking Group of Merrill
- R. Brad Martin: Chairman, RBM Ventures
- Nancy A. Norton: Retired Vice admiral, United States Navy
- Fred Perpall: CEO, The Beck Group
- Joshua Cooper Ramo: Chairman and CEO, Sornay LLC
- Susan Schwab: Professor Emerita, University of Maryland School of Public Policy
- Raj Subramaniam: President and CEO, FedEx Corporation
- Paul S. Walsh: Executive chairman, McLaren Group Limited

=== Financials ===
| Year | Revenue in million US$ | Net income in million US$ | Total Assets in million US$ | Price per Share in US$ | Employees |
|---|---|---|---|---|---|
| 2005 | 29,363 | 1,449 | 20,404 | 85.38 | 138,100 |
| 2006 | 32,294 | 1,806 | 22,690 | 89.00 | 138,400 |
| 2007 | 35,214 | 2,016 | 24,000 | 74.15 | 143,000 |
| 2008 | 37,953 | 1,125 | 25,633 | 53.63 | 145,000 |
| 2009 | 35,497 | 98 | 24,244 | 70.32 | 140,000 |
| 2010 | 34,734 | 1,184 | 24,902 | 78.83 | 141,000 |
| 2011 | 39,304 | 1,452 | 27,385 | 71.21 | 143,000 |
| 2012 | 42,680 | 2,032 | 29,903 | 78.71 | 149,000 |
| 2013 | 44,287 | 2,716 | 33,567 | 124.03 | 160,700 |
| 2014 | 45,567 | 2,324 | 33,070 | 150.55 | 162,000 |
| 2015 | 47,453 | 1,050 | 36,531 | 129.93 | 166,000 |
| 2016 | 50,365 | 1,820 | 45,959 | 163.80 | 168,000 |
| 2017 | 60,319 | 2,997 | 48,552 | 221.48 | 169,000 |
| 2018 | 65,450 | 4,572 | 52,330 | 144.68 | 227,000 |
| 2019 | 69,693 | 540 | 54,403 | 137.77 | 239,000 |
| 2020 | 69,217 | 1,286 | 73,537 | 240.09 | 245,000 |
| 2021 | 83,959 | 5,231 | 82,777 | 241.83 | 289,000 |
| 2022 | 93,512 | 3,826 | 85,994 | 165.32 | 249,000 |
| 2023 | 90,155 | 3,972 | 87,143 | 246.54 | 529,000 |
| 2024 | 87,693 | 4,331 | 87,007 | 279.80 | 430,000 |

==== Taxes ====
In December 2019, CNBC listed FedEx along with 378 additional Fortune 500 companies that "paid an effective federal tax rate of 0% or less" as a result of the Tax Cuts and Jobs Act of 2017. The New York Times reported that FedEx paid $1.5 billion in taxes after the 2017 fiscal year (effective tax rate of 34%) and then $0 after the 2018 fiscal year (effective tax rate of 0%) as a result of lobbying done by the company.

=== Environmental practices and initiatives ===
In early March 2021, FedEx announced plans to make its operations carbon-neutral by 2040. It's investing $2 billion in sustainable energy initiatives, including $100M for a new Yale Center for Natural Carbon Capture and upgrading its aircraft and ground transportation fleets. It will be the first customer to take delivery of GM's electric Zevo delivery vans, as part of the goal of an all-electric ground fleet by 2040.

FedEx’s aircraft, trucks, and facilities emitted approximately 15.7 million metric tons of CO2-equivalent in FY2024. Scope 3 activities added another 9.8 million metric tons CO2-equivalent. FedEx also states that extreme weather and other climate-related disruptions are increasingly affecting its air and ground operations. Independent studies further show that the transport and logistics sector faces growing risks from extreme weather, infrastructure damage, and supply-chain delays. These same climate-driven pressures threaten FedEx’s global network and ability to maintain reliable operations.

=== Political donations and lobbying ===
According to OpenSecrets, FedEx Corp is the 174th largest campaign contributor in the United States, having donated over $35.96 million to federal candidates and committees since 1990, 37% of which went to Democrats and 63% to Republicans. Strong ties to the White House and members of Congress allow access to international trade and tax cut rebates as well as the rules of the business practices of the United States Postal Service. In 2001, FedEx sealed a $9 billion deal with the USPS to transport all of the post office's overnight and express deliveries.

In 2005, FedEx was among 53 entities that contributed the maximum of $250,000 to sponsor the second inauguration of President George W. Bush.

During the 2018 calendar year, FedEx spent nearly $10.2 million lobbying the federal government, its lowest total since 2008 but more than any other company in the air transport industry.

=== SCAC codes ===
The Standard Carrier Alpha Code (SCAC) is a unique code used to identify transportation companies. It is typically two to four alphabetic letters long. It was developed by the National Motor Freight Traffic Association in the 1960s to help the transportation industry computerize data and records. FedEx's codes include:

- FXE – FedEx Express
- FXSP – FedEx SmartPost
- FXG – FedEx Ground
- FXFE – FedEx Freight
- FDCC – FedEx Custom Critical
- FXO – FedEx Office
- FSDC – FedEx Same Day City

== Labor relations ==
In December 2007, the U.S. Internal Revenue Service "tentatively decided" the FedEx Ground Division might be facing a tax liability of $319 million for 2002, due to misclassification of its operatives as independent contractors. Reversing a 1994 decision that allowed FedEx to classify its operatives who own their own vehicles as independent contractors, the IRS audited the years 2003 to 2006, with a view to assessing whether similar misclassification of operatives had taken place. FedEx denied that any irregularities in classification had occurred, but faced legal action from operatives claiming benefits that would have accrued had they been classified as employees.

In June 2009, FedEx began a campaign against UPS and the Teamsters union, accusing its competitor of receiving a bailout in an advertising campaign called "Brown Bailout". FedEx claimed that signing the Federal Aviation Administration re-authorization bill, which would let some of its workers unionize more easily (and, according to the Memphis-based company, "could expose [its] customers at any time to local work stoppages that interrupted the flow of their time-sensitive, high-value shipments"), was equivalent to giving UPS a "bailout". Independent observers heavily criticized FedEx's wording, claiming that it was "an abuse of the term". FedEx Express employees are regulated under the Railway Labor Act.

In July 2020, the Air Line Pilots Association International (ALPA), the union that represents FedEx Corp pilots, called for a suspension on the company's Hong Kong operations. According to the union, some members were subject to "extremely difficult conditions" at hospitals urged by government mandates due to the COVID-19 pandemic. FedEx was criticized more broadly for providing inadequate protections and sick leave during the pandemic.

== Legal issues ==
=== Allegations of controlled substances distribution ===
In July 2014, FedEx was indicted for conspiracy to distribute controlled substances in cooperation with the Chhabra-Smoley Organization and Superior Drugs. According to the U.S. Department of Justice, "FedEx is alleged to have knowingly and intentionally conspired to distribute controlled substances and prescription drugs, including Phendimetrazine (Schedule III); Ambien, Phentermine, Diazepam, and Alprazolam (Schedule IV), to customers who had no legitimate medical need for them based on invalid prescriptions issued by doctors who were acting outside the usual course of professional practice." A representative for the company contested these claims, stating that it would violate personal rights of customers to deny service and that "We are a transportation company—we are not law enforcement". On July 17, 2016, the Department of Justice U.S. Attorney's Office confirmed in a statement that it had asked U.S. District Court Judge Charles Breyer to dismiss the indictment but also did not say why.

=== Illegal parking ===
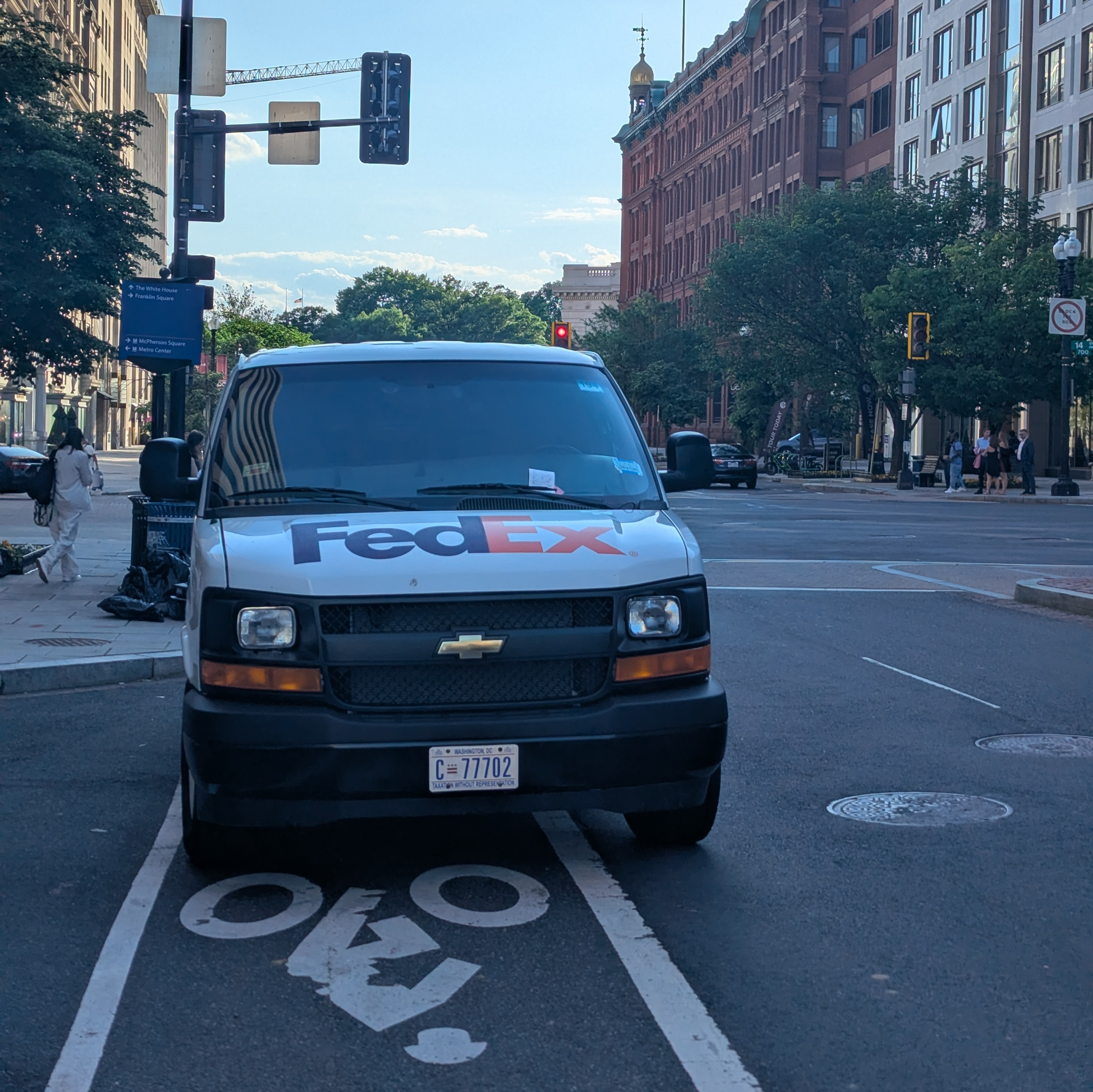
A FedEx vehicle illegally parked in a Washington, D.C., bike lane

Safe streets movement activists have criticized FedEx drivers for frequently illegally parking vehicles in bike lanes while making deliveries, a practice that endangers cyclists. They were criticized alongside peers in a letter from Washington, D.C.'s transportation agency in 2018.

=== Huawei package delivery dispute ===
In June 2019, China filed a case against FedEx for allegedly undermining the rights of Chinese clients. The investigation stemmed from FedEx diverting Huawei packages destined for Asia to FedEx's headquarters in the United States instead without authorisation, after Huawei was added to the US Entity List. FedEx later apologised for the "mistransportation".

It has also been reported that FedEx refused to deliver a used Huawei phone into the US. Writers at PC Magazine tried to ship a Huawei P30 from a UK office to a US one to find it was sent back a few days later.

In July 2019, China accused FedEx of holding back more than 100 packages that Huawei was trying to deliver to China. Chinese regulators said that the company committed "violations" when it diverted Huawei parcels.

== Incidents ==
=== Mass shooting at Indianapolis facility ===
A FedEx Ground facility was the site of a mass shooting in Indianapolis on April 15, 2021, causing nine deaths (including the perpetrator) and at least 6 injuries.

=== Texas fatal crash ===
A FedEx truck in Texas veered into the oncoming lane and collided with an oncoming SUV in Texas in May 2024, causing all five people in the SUV to die.

=== Pennsylvania vehicular homicide ===
A FedEx driver, Santos M. Valentin, killed three people in July 2024 while driving a FedEx semi truck while using his cell phone. Santos has been charged with three counts of vehicular homicide. Valentin claimed the victim's vehicle came out of nowhere; however, video footage from inside the FedEx truck's cab showed Valentin looking at his phone for a long period leading up to the crash.

=== $1 Millions dollars worth of Pokemon cards stolen ===
On October 13, 2026, three thieves in the Santa Ana area broke into an unattended FedEx truck and stole up to 1 million dollars in Pokémon cards. The delivery driver was reportedly on a 60-90 minute break and left the vehicle unattended. Police in the Santa Ana and Orange County departments are working to find the thieves and solve the incident. FedEx is also working closely with PSA to return the missing cards to their original owners.

== See also ==
- Federal Express Flight 705
- FedEx Express Flight 14
- FedEx Express Flight 80
