= FedEx Office =

American office retail chain

FedEx Office Print & Ship Services Inc.

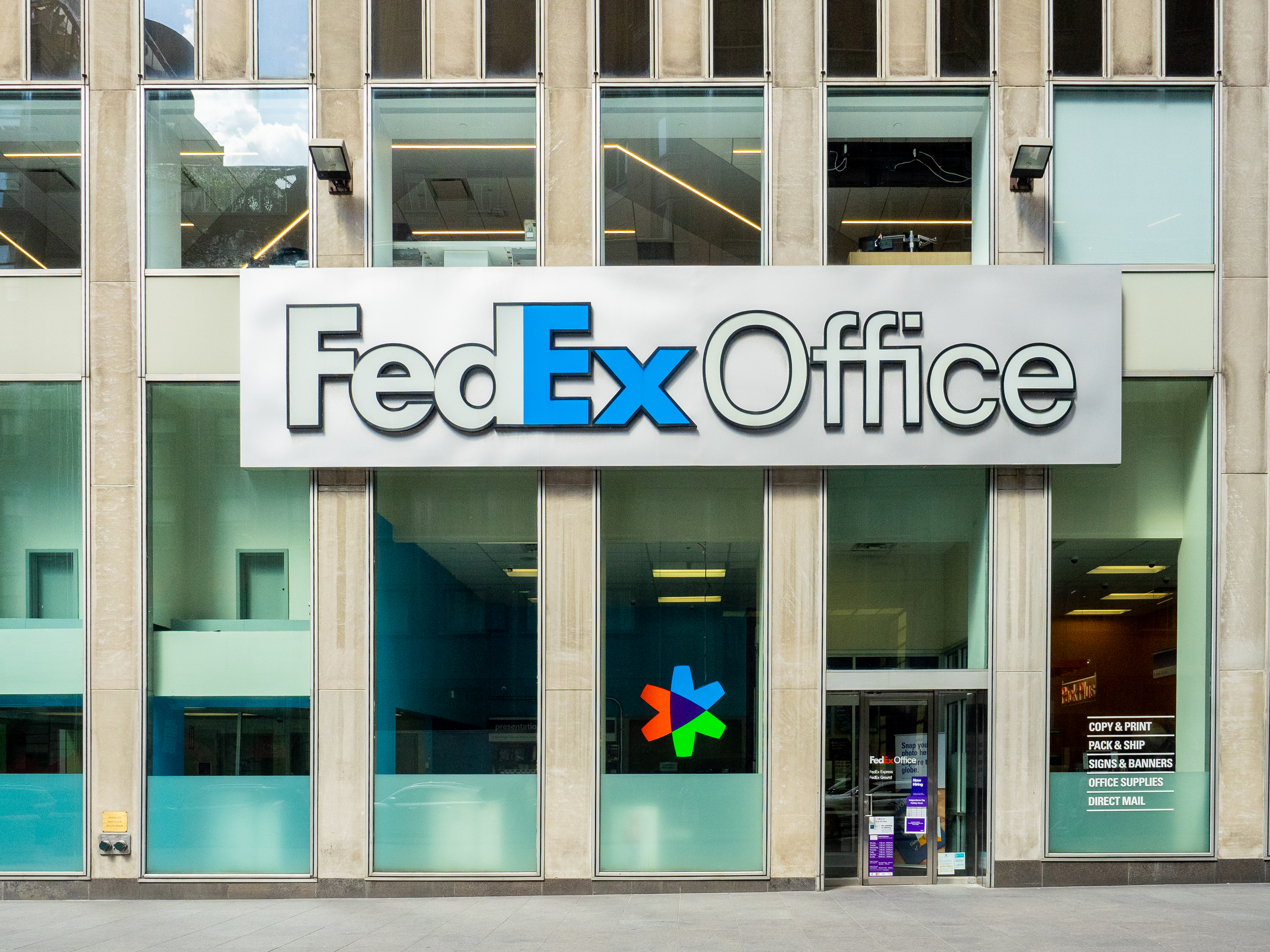
- FedEx Office in Midtown Manhattan
- Trade name: FedEx Office
- Formerly: Kinko's (1970–2004); FedEx Kinko's (2004–2008)
- Company type: Operating Unit
- Industry: Office services
- Founded: 1970; 56 years ago
- Headquarters: Plano, Texas
- Key people: Brian Philips (CEO)
- Products: Copying, printing, marketing, office services and shipping
- Number of employees: 19,000 (2006)
- Parent: FedEx (2004–present)
- Website: office.fedex.com

FedEx Office Print & Ship Services Inc. (doing business as FedEx Office; formerly FedEx Kinko's, and earlier simply Kinko's) is an American retail chain that provides an outlet for FedEx Express and FedEx Ground (including Home Delivery) shipping, as well as copying, printing, marketing, office services and shipping. While FedEx, to the Kinko's founder's dismay, dropped the Kinko's name in summer 2008, the name remains in use. Unlike its main competitor, the UPS Store, which is franchised, all FedEx Office stores are corporate-owned.

== History ==
Paul Orfalea, whose nickname was "Kinko" because of his curly hair, founded the company as Kinko's in 1970. Its first copy shop, which Orfalea opened with a sidewalk copy machine, was in the college community of Isla Vista, California, next to the campus of the University of California, Santa Barbara. He left the company in 2000, following a dispute with the investment firm Clayton, Dubilier & Rice ("CDR"), to which he had sold a large stake in the company three years earlier.

Kinko's played a significant role in the development of American counterculture in the 1980s and 1990s. In her study of the role of xerography in urban cultures in this period, the anthropologist Kate Eichhorn recounts:

At its height of popularity between the late 1980s and mid-1990s, Kinko's outlets in urban centres across North America were catch basins for writers, artists, anarchists, punks, insomniacs, graduate students, DIY bookmakers, zinesters, obsessive compulsive hobbyists, scam artists, people living on the street, and people just living on the edge. Whether you were promoting a new band or publishing a pamphlet on DIY gynaecology or making a fake ID for an underage friend, Kinko's was the place to be.

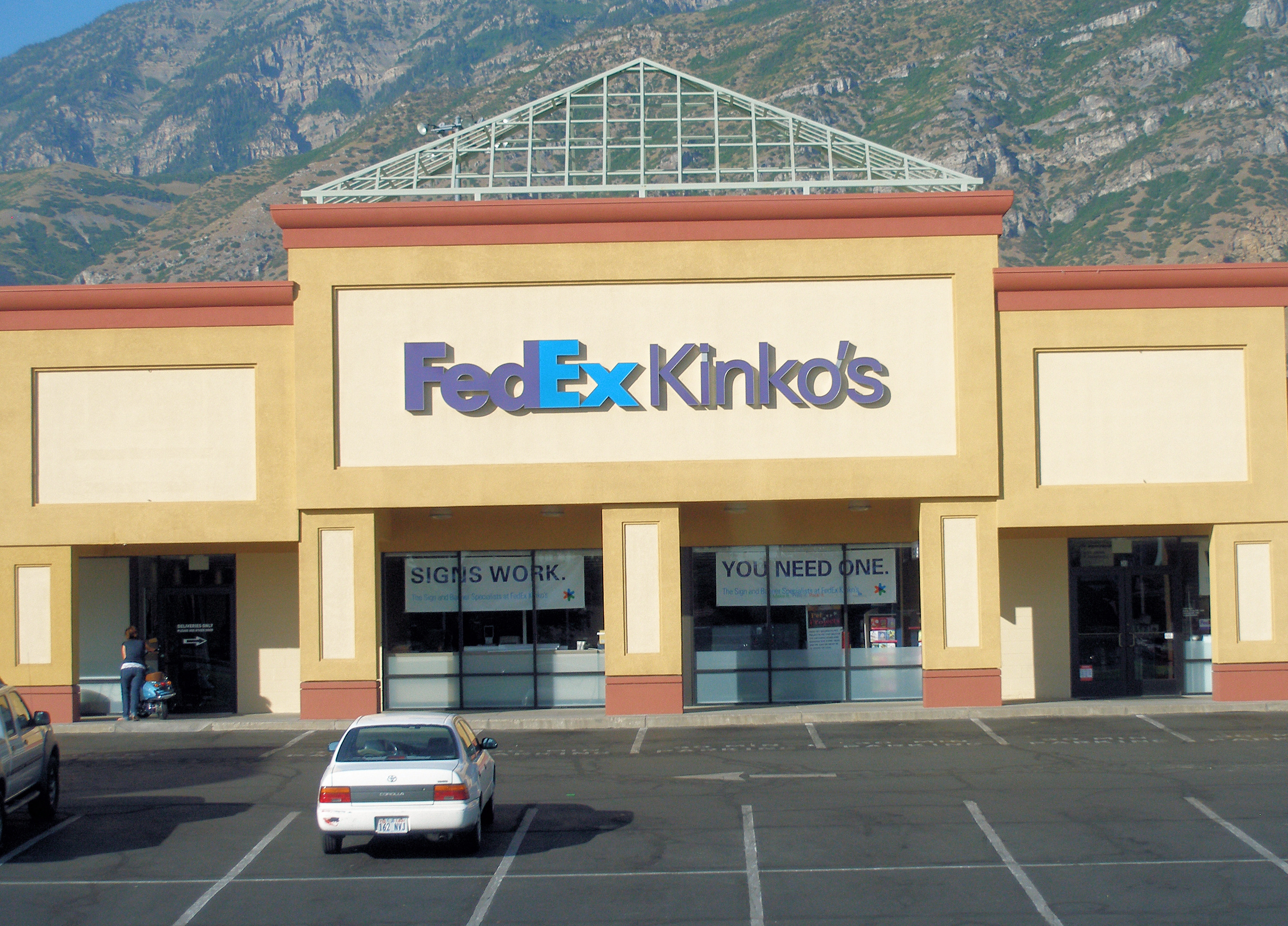
A FedEx Office store with the FedEx Kinko's sign

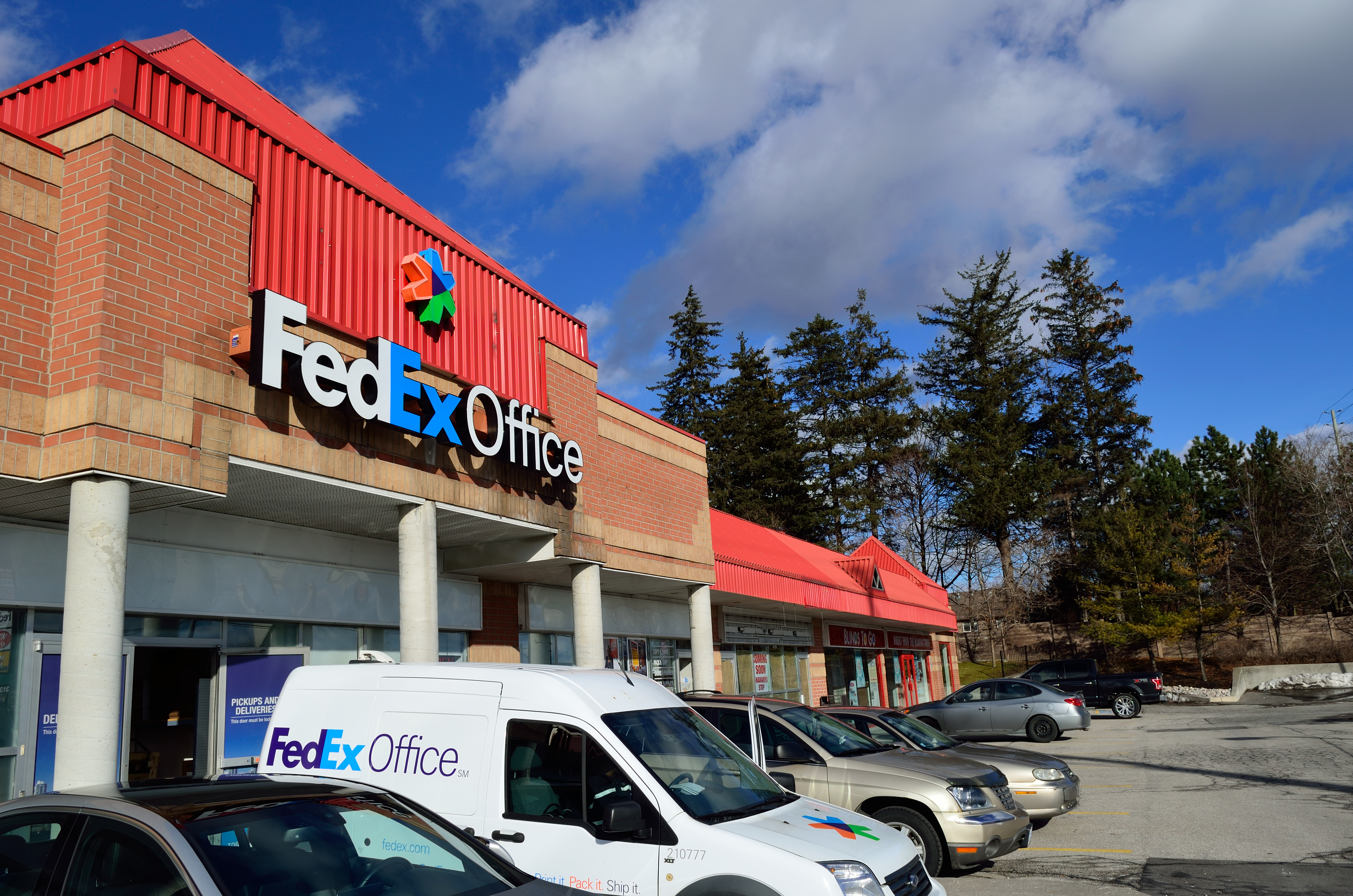
FedEx Office in Ontario, Canada

Orfalea wrote in his autobiography that disentangling him from Kinko's took enormous effort from the lawyers at Gibson, Dunn & Crutcher. The problem was that rather than adopt the traditional franchising model (by which the promoter creates a corporation that sells franchises), he had built the company as a series of loosely connected personal partnerships between each store owner and himself. By 1997, he had established over 127 Kinko's partnerships. All had to be carefully dismantled and rolled into a single S corporation to convert the company to a more centralized corporate-owned business model. Orfalea and several other key partners believed doing so would decrease time Orfalea spent mediating disputes between different factions of Kinko's partnerships and enable the oldest partners to cash out smoothly and transition to a new generation of managers. However, the new structure also made it easier for CDR to gradually force him out of his own company.

Kinko's corporate headquarters was in Ventura, California for many years, but in 2002, the company relocated to the Galleria Towers in Dallas, Texas. In February 2004, FedEx bought Kinko's for $2.4 billion, which then became known as FedEx Kinko's Office and Print Centers. Prior to the FedEx acquisition, most Kinko's stores were open 24 hours a day. After the acquisition, FedEx reduced the hours for many locations. On June 2, 2008, FedEx announced that they were re-branding FedEx Kinko's as FedEx Office, the retail branch of the FedEx Corporation. Some stores and branding still showed FedEx Kinko's signage until summer 2010. To ease customer confusion during the transition period, many stores displayed a large purple sign in the window that said "Kinko's Printing Inside."

Brian Phillips is the president and chief executive officer, following Ken May's departure on March 7, 2008. The company's primary clientele are small business and home office clients. According to the company, it has approximately 2,200 operating facilities. With over $2 billion in revenues, the company is the 7th largest printing company in North America. The company's primary competitors in the crowded North American market include The UPS Store, Office Depot/OfficeMax, AlphaGraphics, Staples, Sir Speedy, and Vistaprint.

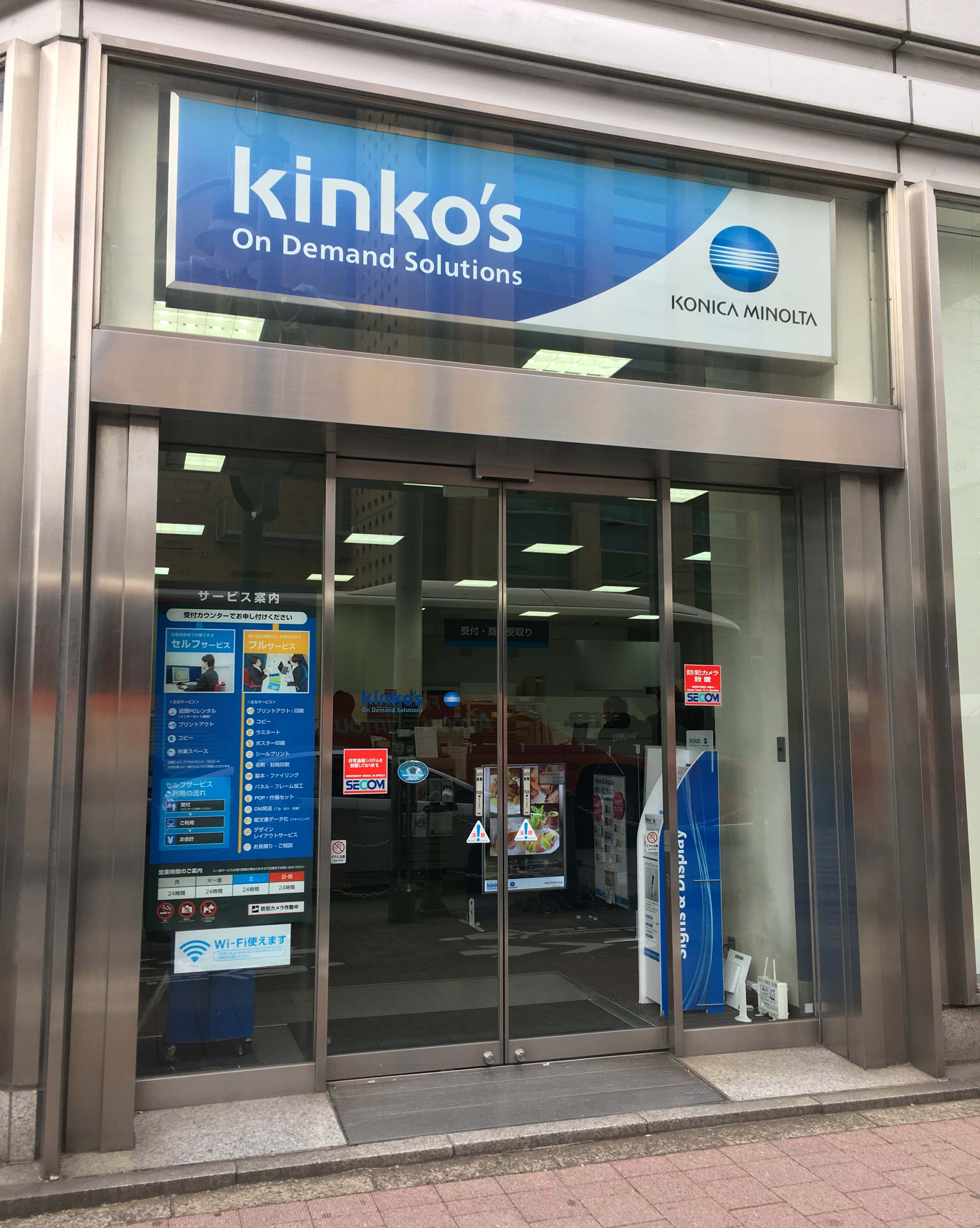
Kinko's logo in Ikebukuro, Tokyo, Japan

Kinko's pursued an international expansion strategy during the boom years of the 1990s and early 2000s. Countries hosting FedEx Office centers outside the U.S. include Kuwait, Lebanon, and the United Arab Emirates. Kinko's formerly operated in Australia, Mexico, and the Netherlands but withdrew from those markets in late 2008 due to low demand. During the Great Recession, FedEx Office withdrew from China, Japan, South Korea and the United Kingdom. Konica Minolta bought the Japanese and South Korean operations from FedEx.

On July 24, 2017, FedEx announced that its 24 Canadian stores, a manufacturing plant in Markham, Ontario, and its head office in Toronto, would be closing on August 18, 2017, after 32 years of operation with 214 employees being laid off. FedEx's Canadian shipping operations would continue, however.

In March 2018, FedEx Office announced that it would open 500 stores inside of Walmart locations throughout the U.S.

On April 5, 2023, FedEx announced at its DRIVE Investor Event that it would consolidate its operating companies into one organization. This process was largely completed as of June 2024, with FedEx Office joining FedEx Freight, FedEx Dataworks, FedEx Custom Critical, FedEx Logistics, FedEx Supply Chain, and FedEx Express together under the Federal Express Corporation operating company.
