= Fred Perpall =

American business executive

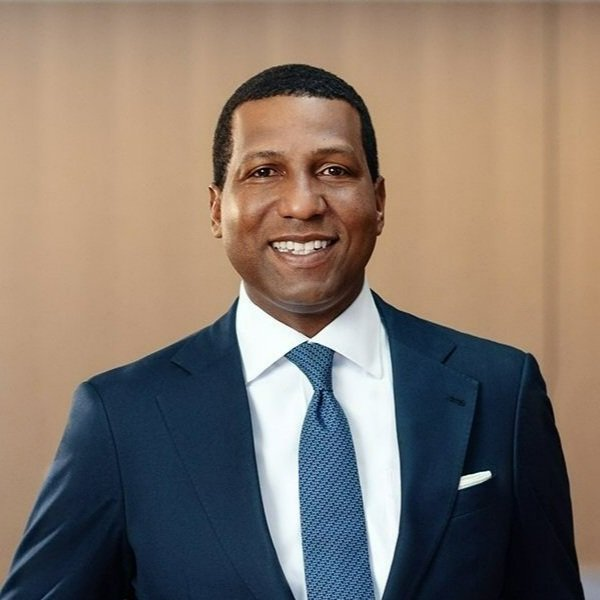
- Perpall in 2021
- Born: October 31, 1974 (age 51); Nassau, Bahamas
- Education: College of the Bahamas; University of Texas at Arlington; Harvard University
- Occupations: CEO of the Beck Group, executive member of the United States Golf Association Executive Committee, Director at FedEx' Board of Directors
- Known for: President of the United States Golf Association
- Spouse: Abigail
- Children: 2 daughters
- Website: www.beckgroup.com

Fred Perpall (born 31 October 1974) is an American business executive. He is known as the first black person to be elected President of the United States Golf Association in 2023.

Since 2013, Perpall has served as CEO of The Beck Group, a US-based international architecture and construction company. He is also on the board of directors of FedEx.

In February 2023, Fred Perpall was elected as the 67th President of the USGA.

== Early life and education ==
Fred Perpall was born on October 31, 1974, the youngest of four children in a middle-class family from Nassau, Bahamas. His father was an avionics engineer and his mother ran a small cafeteria. Perpall piqued his interest in architecture in childhood while working in the construction business with his uncle.

Perpall earned a two-year Associate degree in Architecture from the College of the Bahamas and played on the 1994 Bahamas men's national basketball team. He later migrated to the US to study and pursue his career in architecture.

In 1996, Perpall graduated with a Bachelor of Science in Architecture from the University of Texas at Arlington. Continuing his studies at the University of Texas, he received his Master of Architecture diploma in 1997, also earning the AIA Medal of Honor. Perpall is an alumnus of the 183rd class of Harvard Business School’s Advanced Management Program (completed in 2012) and is a former Americas Fellow at The Baker Institute at Rice University.

== Career ==
=== Architecture ===
Perpall began his professional career as a project designer in Gideon/Toal Architects in 1996. In 1999, he shortly joined Urban Architecture of Dallas as Architectural Intern before the company merged with the Beck Group the same year.

Since 1999, Perpall has had numerous positions in the Beck Group. He originally proceeded as an MBA architectural intern. Then he worked as an associate architect, rising to become director, where he facilitated multipleconstruction projects. Perpall was sent to Beck’s Atlanta office in 2004 to establish its design practice. By 2010, he was the managing director of the organization’s eastern division. In January 2013, he was appointed as the CEO of the Beck Group succeeding Henry C. Beck III in this role. As CEO of the Beck Group, Perpall has been instrumental in multiple notable projects including Phipps Plaza Mixed-Use, Dickies Arena, Atrium Health – Center City Medical Office Buildings and Princess Margaret Hospital in Nassau, Bahamas, among others.

In December 2021, Perpall joined FedEx Corporation's board of directors, also becoming a member of its Audit and Nominating & Governance Committees.

=== United States Golf Association ===
Perpall was a member of the board of trustees of the Trinity Forest Golf Club in Dallas, Texas before joining the USGA Executive Committee in 2018. In 2021, he chaired the USGA's Championship Committee and served on the Amateur Status Committee. In December 2021, Perpall was nominated President-elect of the USGA, the first black person in the organization's history.

== Community work and affiliations ==
An active member of his community, Perpall is on the board of directors of Starwood Property Trust, Dallas Medical Resource, and Triumph Bancorp. Perpall served a three-year term on the Board of Councilors for The Carter Center. A distinguished member of the Dallas Citizens Council, he served as chairman of the organization from 2019 to 2020. Fred Perpall is a Fellow of the American Institute of Architects (FAIA).

According to the Dallas Morning News, "...in June 2020, Dallas Mayor Eric Johnson appointed Perpall and Richard Fisher, former president and CEO of the Federal Reserve Bank of Dallas, to lead the COVID Economic Recovery Task Force, a public-private partnership to advance short-term recovery and drive long-term economic growth in Dallas.

== Publications and podcasts ==
- Fred Perpall, "Dallas Citizens Council chairman: We have a moral imperative to improve outcomes for kids in difficult neighborhoods", The Dallas Morning News (November 18, 2019)
- CEO Podcast: Beck Group’s Fred Perpall On Creating Informal Time For Teams To Grow Together (January, 2021)

== Personal life ==
Fred Perpall is married to Abigail Perpall. Perpall lives with his family in the Highland Park, Texas area of the Dallas–Fort Worth metroplex. Fred Perpall is a protestant and affiliated with the United Methodist Church.

== Extra links ==
- The Beck Group
- The United States Golf Association
