= Beck Technology =

Software development company

Beck Technology, Inc.
- Company type: Private
- Industry: Computer software
- Founded: Dallas, Texas (1996)
- Founder: Henry C. Beck III
- Headquarters: Dallas, Texas, United States
- Key people: Stewerd Carole (President); Michelle Borin (Chief Technology Officer)
- Products: DESTINI Estimator; DESTINI Bid Day; DESTINI Profiler; DESTINI Optioneer
- Number of employees: 86 (Nationwide, 2022)
- Website: www.beck-technology.com

Beck Technology is a software development company servicing the construction industry. The company is based in Dallas, Texas. Beck Technology offers a suite of products under DESTINI: design estimation integration initiative. Products include DESTINI Estimator, DESTINI Bid Day, DESTINI Profiler (aka DProfiler), and DESTINI Optioneer (as a service). Beck Technology serves builders as well as owners/developers with pro formas and scope build out.

Beck Technology was founded in 1996 as an internal group of The Beck Group. DESTINI Profiler was a proprietary software which provides immediate costs for buildings as they were modeled in the conceptual and schematic design phases. In 2006, DESTINI Profiler was launched commercially to the construction market. A consulting arm of Beck Technology was formed in 2008 to assist owners, developers, and general contractors with the use of DESTINI Profiler. DESTINI Profiler gives builders the tools to provide real-time cost data and feedback to owners and architects, as well as giving the preconstruction team a major advantage and winning contracts.

In 2013, Sundt Construction approached Beck Technology to provide significant input on a new estimating platform to work with DESTINI Profiler data. The result of the project was the first iteration of DESTINI Estimator. DESTINI Estimator was rolled out in 2014 to Sundt Construction and then commercially released in 2015. As of 2022, over 3,000 estimators in the United States and Canada use DESTINI Estimator to estimate complex commercial construction projects.

In 2022, Beck Technology released DESTINI Bid Day, a bid leveling software. Bid Day was the first software from Beck Technology to be fully hosted on the web and allows users to quickly mitigate risk in the selection of sub-contractors while pulling sub-contractor data into the estimate within DESTINI Estimator.

Presently, the company is headquartered in Santander Tower (formerly called Thanksgiving Tower) of Downtown Dallas.
