= FedEx Supply Chain =

American third-party logistics provider

- Formerly: H. Shear Trucking Company (1898-1940); GENCO (1940-2010); GENCO ATC (2010-2017)
- Type: Subsidiary
- Industry: Transportation
- Founded: 1898; 128 years ago
- Founder: Hyman Shear
- Headquarters: Pittsburgh, Pennsylvania, U.S.
- Area served: Worldwide
- Key people: Scott Temple, President & CEO; Dr. Udo Lange, President & CEO, FedEx Logistics
- Products: Fulfillment; Warehousing; Reverse logistics; Transportation
- Revenue: ▲US$45.2 billion (FY2020)
- Number of employees: 11,000 (2017)
- Parent: FedEx Corporation
- Website: supplychain.fedex.com

FedEx Supply Chain formerly known as GENCO (General Commodities Warehouse & Distribution Co.) is a major third-party logistics (3PL) provider in the United States and Canada.

It serves various industries, including: technology & electronics, retail & e-commerce, consumer & industrial goods, and healthcare industries. The firm manages 130 Warehouse and Distribution Center operations in North America region with a total of 35 million square feet of warehouse space under its management.

Founded in 1898 by Hyman Shear as H. Shear Trucking Company in Pittsburgh, it was renamed FedEx Supply Chain (FSC) in 2017, having been acquired and become a subsidiary of FedEx two years earlier. FSC was recognized by Multichannel Merchant as a Top 3PL for 2018.

On 1 July 2026, FedEx and CMA CGM announced that CMA CGM had agreed to acquire FedEx Supply Chain at an enterprise value of $1.4 billion. The acquisition closed in October 2026.

== History ==
=== Early history ===
Logo of GENCO prior to being branded as FedEx Supply Chain

In 1898, Hyman Shear began operating a drayage company known as H. Shear Trucking Company. Leading a blind horse with a wagon, Hyman delivered commodities to Pittsburgh and its surrounding communities. In 1917, H. Shear Trucking purchased its first gas-powered truck allowing the company to expand its delivery area. Within a short period of time, the company was operating seven trucks.

Shear's son Sam enrolled in Pitt's School of Pharmacy, at his father's urging. After graduating in 1930 Sam moved with his wife to Pittsburgh's Squirrel Hill neighborhood and bought a pharmacy. After nine years of running the Pharmacy, he joined his father's trucking business. Under Sam's leadership, the company's delivery fleet grew and warehousing and distribution services were added.

=== 1960s-80s ===
By 1966, Shear Trucking Company employed over 20 drivers and was servicing customers such as Copperweld Steel, Mattel Toys Kimberly-Clark, Kaufmann's and Gimbel's Department Store.

In 1971, Herb Shear - Sam's son - the third generation of the family, joined his father and expanded the company's base of operations to include public warehouse operations. The company was awarded the contract to provide the Pennsylvania Liquor Control Board distribution services to Western Pennsylvania in 1975 and in 1988, Distribution Resources Inc. (DRI) was formed in Eastern Pennsylvania to provide customers with flexible labor-intense services including light product assembly, refurbishing, manipulation, and general distribution services.

Scanning Solutions, Inc. a division dedicated to the development of returns processing software and reclamation center management, was formed in the late ‘80s. The company offered retailers, wholesalers and manufacturers with flexible, centralized returned goods processing and asset recovery services. Herb also pioneered a new software platform known as R-Log to manage Reverse logistics. GENCO became an industry leader in reverse logistics and liquidation services.

=== 1990s-2015 ===
1995 saw the consolidation of numerous company divisions and services under one banner name, "GENCO Distribution System". Along with the new name, came new concepts and developments in supply chain management. 1997 brought about new faces and services through the acquisition of Alpha & Omega; an established Pittsburgh-based warehouse management system (WMS) software development company.

GENCO ended the past century, positioning itself with a broader range of services through the 1999 acquisition of two companies, Cumberland Distribution Services, building upon the company's base and history of distribution center management services; and Materials for Today's Learning / Joint Ventures, in the fulfillment industry. It also acquired IOgistics in 2003 and Capital Returns in 2005. In 2010 GENCO acquired publicly held Downers Grove, Illinois based ATC Technology Corp. The deal was valued at $512.6 million. After the acquisition the combined company came to be known as GENCO ATC.

Through the acquisition of GENCO ATC by FedEx in 2015, FedEx Supply Chain was formed. FedEx acquired the company for $1.4 billion.

== FedEx Supply Chain ==
The company serves multiple industries and is a leader in non-asset-based transportation, warehousing and distribution, and value-added services. It also works with reverse logistics processes, including returns, recommerce and recycling. The company processes 358 million returns annually and more than 500K direct-to-consumer shipments daily. The company was recognized by Multichannel Merchant as a Top 3PL for 2018.

FedEx Supply Chain became one of the business units of a newly created operating company of FedEx - FedEx Logistics - in January 2019. FedEx Logistics was created by the re-branding of FedEx Trade Networks.

== Leadership Team ==
- Scott Temple - President and Chief Executive Officer
- Elizabeth Koziol - Senior Vice President and Chief Operating Officer
- Chacko Verghese - Senior Vice President, Information Technology
- Jeremiah Benge - Vice President, Business Development
