= The Beck Group =

American general construction contractor

- Type: Private
- Industry: Architecture and Construction
- Founded: 1912; 114 years ago, in Houston, Texas
- Founder: Henry C. Beck
- Headquarters: Dallas, Texas, United States
- Number of locations: 10 Offices
- Key people: Fred Perpall; (CEO); Henry C. Beck III; (executive chairman)
- Number of employees: over 850 (U.S. and Mexico, 2023)
- Website: beckgroup.com

The Beck Group is a company that provides architecture, construction, sustainability, virtual building, and technology services. The company is based in Dallas, Texas. It has regional offices in Atlanta, Austin, Carolinas, Dallas, Denver, Fort Worth, Mexico City, Monterrey, South Florida, and Tampa. The Beck Group serves a diverse range of industries including commercial, corporate, healthcare, entertainment, faith-based, institutional, among others.

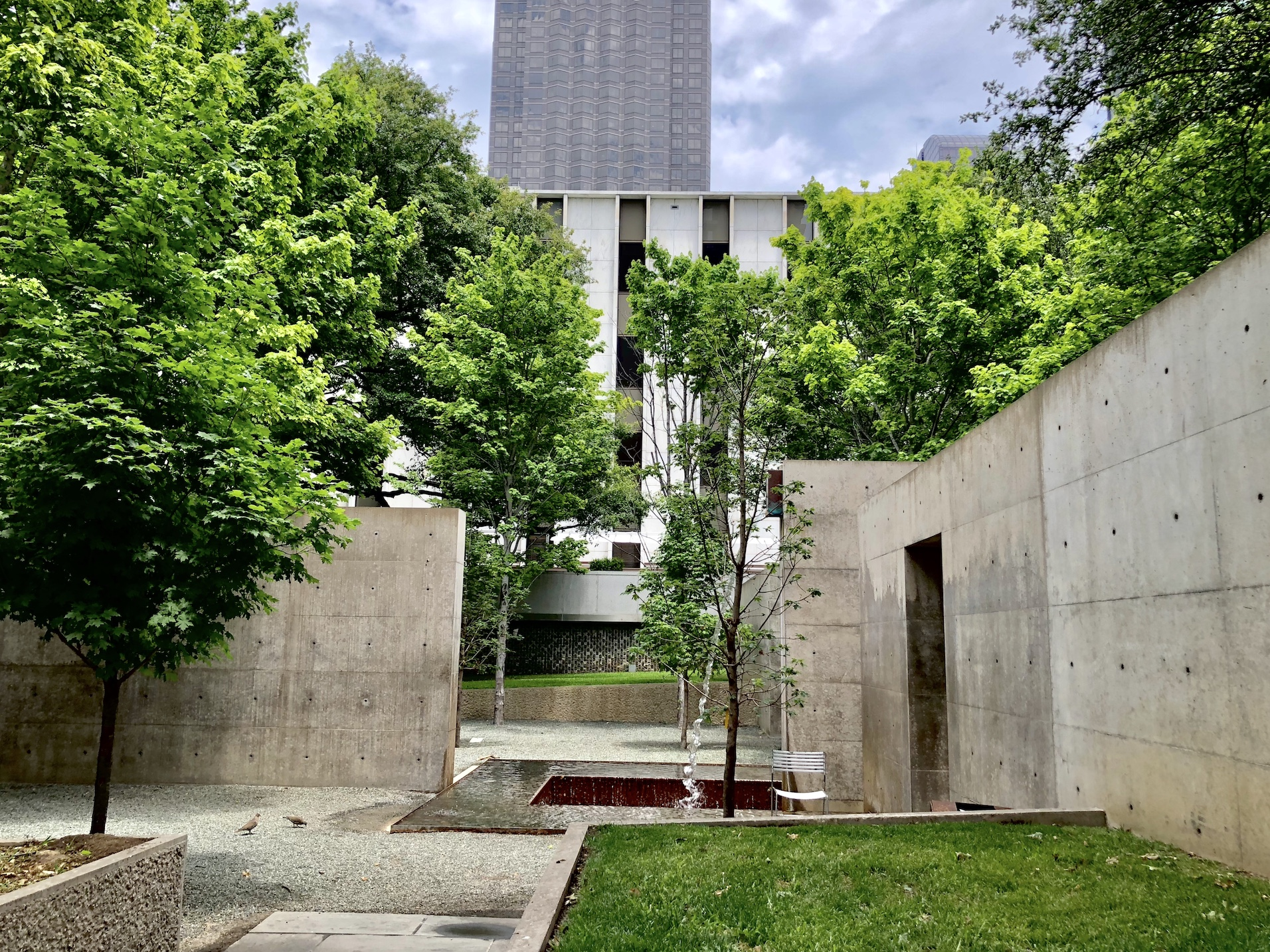
Beck Park in Dallas, Texas

== History ==
The Beck Group was founded in 1912 by Henry C. Beck in Houston, Texas as a general contractor as Central Contracting Company. In 1934, it moved its headquarters to Dallas, a requirement for building the city's Cotton Exchange Building. In 1946, Henry C. Beck, then the sole proprietor, changed the name to the Henry C. Beck Company. In 1981 the company changed its name to HCB Contractors.

The majority of their work throughout their history has been commercial, but realized they needed to expand beyond that. In the 1990s, the construction company added other services like design and real estate development. It also acquired a UK-developed software product (Reflex). It began to develop a proprietary software, DESTINI, which would provide immediate costs for buildings as they were modeled in the schematic design phase.

=== Management under Henry C. Beck, Sr. ===
Beck lead the company from its founding in 1912 as Central Contracting Company until his death at the age of 61 when the firm was called Henry C. Beck Company. Beck was eulogized by the Dallas Morning News, as paraphrased:

"Henry Beck's career as a builder parallels the impressive physical growth of the southwest. He was an integral part of it. His death at 61 deprives this region of an outstanding figure in the industry... His untiring efforts had much to do with changing the area's structure. His interest was building. It was building of substantiality and good taste. The attractiveness of southwestern cities, in comparison with the gloomier cities of the northeast, is a tribute to the fore-visioned builders, of whom Mr. Beck was a distinctive representative."

=== Management under Henry C. Beck, Jr. ===
In 1948, at the age of 32, Beck assumed the reins of one of the nation's top builders Henry C. Beck Company. He would go on to lead the company for almost four decades.

=== Management under Larry A. Wilson, Sr. ===
In 1976, Larry Wilson (1935–2016) served as president and chief executive officer of Henry C. Beck Company. Wilson oversaw projects including the Crescent, Plaza of the Americas, the Reunion Project, Fountain Place and Cityplace. Under Wilson's leadership, The Beck Group also built large office projects in Boston, Philadelphia and Washington, D.C. During Wilson's tenure, the company changed names from Henry C. Beck Company to HCB Contractors, Inc.

=== Management under Henry "Peter" C. Beck, III ===
In 1992, Peter Beck became the company's fourth chief executive officer of HCB Contractors. In 1999, under Beck's leadership, the company merged with Urban Architecture, a regional design firm, and re-branded as The Beck Group. The firm began pursuing integrated projects completing both design and construction services in-house. In 2002 The Beck Group was named one of Fortune Magazine's '100 Best Companies to Work For'.

=== Management under Fred Perpall ===
In 2013, Fred Perpall took over from Peter Beck as the fifth chief executive officer of The Beck Group. Only the second non-family member to hold such role.

In late 2019, the company relocated its headquarters to Santander Tower in Downtown Dallas.

In late 2023, Beck announced a strategic growth investment with Pamlico in Beck Technology. Headquartered in Dallas, Texas, Beck Technology serves contractors.

== Notable projects ==
Project	City	State	Services
200 Clayton Street	Denver	Colorado	Architecture
AT&T Pinnacle Park	Dallas	Texas	Integrated: Architecture, Construction, Development
One Atlantic Center	Atlanta	Georgia	Construction
Baylor University Sciences Building	Waco	Texas	Integrated: Construction, Development Management
Baylor East Village	Waco	Texas	Construction
Baylor Research and Innovation Collaborative	Waco	Texas	Construction
Belleview North Tower	Denver	Colorado	Design-Build
Comerica Bank Tower	Dallas	Texas	Construction
Cotton Bowl Stadium	Dallas	Texas	Construction
The Crescent	Dallas	Texas	Construction
Dallas Arboretum	Dallas	Texas	Construction
Dickies Arena	Fort Worth	Texas	Construction
Disney Corporate Headquarters	Burbank	California	Construction
Duke University Basketball Practice Facility	Durham	North Carolina	Integrated: Architecture, Construction, Programming
The Domain	Austin	Texas	Construction
Fellowship Church, Main Campus	Grapevine	Texas	Construction
Fellowship Church, Downtown Campus	Dallas	Texas	Renovation
Fidelity Investments Regional Center	Westlake	Texas	Construction
Firewheel Town Center	Garland	Texas	Integrated: Architect of Record, Construction
First Gulf Building	Denver	Colorado	Design-Build
First National Bank Plaza	Phoenix	Arizona	Construction
Fountain Place	Dallas	Texas	Construction
Gateway Church (Main Campus)	Southlake	Texas	Architecture
Gateway Church (Satellite Campus)	North Fort Worth	Texas	Architecture
Gateway Church (Satellite Campus)	Grand Prairie	Texas	Architecture and Construction
Guarantee Bank Tower	Phoenix	Arizona	Construction
Hunt Corporate Headquarters	Dallas	Texas	Architecture
Los Angeles Museum of Contemporary Art	Los Angeles	California	Construction
Mary Kay Headquarters	Dallas	Texas	Construction
Mary Kay Manufacturing	Dallas	Texas	Construction
One Platte	Denver	Colorado	Design-Build
Phoenix Financial Center	Phoenix	Arizona	Construction
The Populus Hotel	Denver	Colorado	Construction
Poudre Valley Hospital Master Plan Implementation	Fort Collins	Colorado	Construction
The Nasher Sculpture Center	Dallas	Texas	Integrated: Associate Architect of Record, Construction
Kimbell Art Museum, Piano Pavilion	Fort Worth	Texas	Construction
RadioShack Headquarters	Fort Worth	Texas	Construction
Regis University DeSmet Hall	Denver	Colorado	Design-Build
Royal Gorge Bridge & Park Visitor Center	Canyon City	Colorado	Design-Build
Southlake Town Square	Southlake	Texas	Integrated: Architect of Record, Construction
Shake Shack at Uptown Crescent	Dallas	Texas	Integrated: Architect of Record, Construction
Texas Health Hospital Mansfield	Mansfield	Texas	Design-Build
Texas Motor Speedway	Fort Worth	Texas	Construction
USAA Southeast Regional Office	Tampa	Florida	Construction
Valley Center	Phoenix	Arizona	Construction
Van Wezel Performing Arts Hall	Sarasota	Florida	Construction
Victory Lofts	Tampa	Florida	Integrated: Architecture, Construction, Development, Media
Victory Plaza at Victory Park	Dallas	Texas	Construction
