= Copier service =

A copier service provider is a business that sells document copying services. These providers use equipment that can produce high volumes of copies.

== Market for copier services ==
Copier services are important for businesses as they may not have the staff, time, or equipment to produce a high number of documents within a required time frame.

Copier services may be provided to customers on-demand or through contractual arrangements with specified volumes and times. Contractual arrangements help increase stability for both the copier service provider and their customers.

Copies may be produced from paper originals or electronic files.

Copier service companies may also provide related services such as sending faxes and creating digital files from paper originals for use by the customer in electronic applications such as email.

Copier service providers may also lease to customers fax machines, photocopiers, scanners, printers, and other pieces of electronic business and office equipment and provide maintenance services for them.

== See also ==
- Printer (publishing)
