= Henry C. Beck III =

American businessman

Henry C. Beck III ("Peter") (born 1955) is an American businessman, who was CEO of The Beck Group - an architecture, engineering, and construction firm based out of Dallas, with offices in Houston, Austin, Atlanta, Denver, Tampa, Florida, Mexico City and Cabo San Lucas, Mexico - for 20 years, and is executive chairman.

== Early life, family, and education ==
Beck is the third child of Henry C. Beck Jr., noted Dallas philanthropist and former CEO of The Beck Group (then named HCB Construction), and Patricia Beck (née Davis), daughter of former Republic National Bank (formerly First Republic Bank Corporation) chairman, Wirt Davis. Beck was born and raised in Dallas, TX and lived in what became known as "The Beck House", designed by famed architect Philip Johnson - the only home Johnson ever designed in Dallas. Writes Frank Welch in the book Phillip Johnson and Texas, "Young Peter Beck, [due to Johnson's penchant for designing arches] called his mother and father 'Mr. and Mrs. Arch'. " Beck maintained a close relationship with his father throughout his life; when asked by D Magazine in 2008 whom he considered to be his mentor, Beck answered: "My father, no question. He was a very special man and not only a great role model for me but for many others." A few years before Beck Jr.'s death, Beck III and his sister Spindrift Al Swaidi envisioned and commissioned Downtown Dallas' Henry C. Beck Jr. Park in honor of their father. Beck attended high school at Phillips Andover, graduating in 1973. He did his undergrad studies at Princeton University, graduating with a degree in civil engineering in 1977. Beck then went on to receive a Master's degree from Stanford Business School.

== Career ==
=== The Beck Group ===
Beck became CEO of The Beck Group in 1992, the company's 4th such chief. In 2002, under Beck's leadership, The Beck Group was named one of Fortune Magazine's 100 Best Companies to Work For. With regard to his business philosophy, Beck has said that, "Our company has benefited from leaving the last dollar on the table for the other guy. This allows you to develop a good reputation working with customers. What you want to do is delight the customer. And if that costs money sometimes, then it costs money. As an underlying philosophy, that's critical to our culture." And when asked by Smart Business Magazine what traits he considered most important to being a successful leader, Beck replied, "Listening well and having empathy. Having an understanding of the predicament, the opportunities and aspirations of your people, your customers, your peer companies, your joint venture partners. It's about understanding other people."

=== Merger and invention of DProfiler ===
Writes Nancy B. Solomon in the book, Architecture: Celebrating The Past, Designing The Future, "In the mid-1990s, {Beck Group} president Peter Beck concluded that pure construction had become an economic dead end {...}. His company's future, he believed, lay in providing seamlessly integrated design, construction and development services. So, in 1996, Beck purchased the rights to a British Software program, and The Beck Group rewrote the program and renamed it DESTINI." Beck later refined the product over the course of the next 10 years and named it DProfiler. Said Beck, "There was no such tool on the market {at the time} for the AEC (architecture, engineering, construction) industry." No such program had been invented before, and it changed the world of architecture, engineering, and construction forever. DProfiler allows The Beck Group (and any AEC company who purchases the product) to offer its clients integrated product delivery using 3D modeling and quality calculations with cost estimating linked to the firms' own database.

Via the development of DProfiler, Beck began to realize something. Said Beck, "We saw that this was just a small microcosm of the overall issue about the industry, and that there was no incentive for anybody to produce a tool that would marry the cost of a project with the design of the project,” Beck says. “We had people that were motivated to produce the design, and there were great technologies to do that; and there were great technologies to estimate [building costs]. But there wasn't any integration between the two.” Beck knew that this integration was essential and, thus, made the decision in 1999 to merge with Urban Architecture of Dallas. The merger allowed The Beck Group to become a full-service firm consisting of Architecture, Engineering, and Construction. Beck's vision in merging with Urban Architecture and growing his company to what it is now has played a huge role in shaping the architecture, engineering, and construction industry in the Southern United States and the United States as a whole.

=== Notable projects as CEO, Executive Chairman ===
During Beck's tenure as CEO and Executive Chairman of The Beck Group, the company designed and built multiple projects, including:

==== Architecture ====
- Joyful Church - Pohang, South Korea
- Hunt Oil Company Headquarters - Dallas, TX - Earning EPA's ENERGY STAR certification and winner of: 'Best of the Best' 2008 National Award for Architectural Design, The Arc of Dallas' 2008 Topping Out Award
- Nutrabolt Company Headquarters - Bryan, TX
- SaRang Church - Seoul, South Korea

==== Construction ====
- Salvador Dalí Museum – St. Petersburg, FL
- Kimbell Art Museum, Piano Pavilion - Fort Worth, TX
- Nasher Museum of Art - Duke University
- The Domain Mall - Austin, TX
- Radio Shack Corporate Headquarters - Fort Worth, TX
- Victory Plaza - Dallas, TX
- Rosewood Crescent Hotel - Dallas, TX
- Reunion Tower – GeoDeck - Dallas, TX

==== Built and designed by Beck Group ====
- First Baptist Church sanctuary and campus expansion - Dallas, TX
- The Nasher Sculpture Center - Dallas, TX

== Civic leadership and awards ==
In the late 1980s, Beck was appointed by the governor of Texas to the Texas Parks and Wildlife Commission, a role he filled for 6 years.

He also previously won the 1999 Chairman's Award from the Greater Dallas Chamber of Commerce, where he went on to sit as chairman. He was chairman of The Dallas Foundation and was on the Stanford Business School Trust as well.

Beck is on the board of trustees of the Southwestern Medical Foundation, The Salvation Army's DFW Metroplex Command Advisory Board and the Design Futures Council. He is on the Leadership Council of Commit!, an organization helping to drive student achievement throughout Dallas County. As of 2014, he was listed in DFW Most Powerful's 1000 Definitive Movers and Shaker's list.
