= Raque =

Raque is a surname.

== People ==
People with this surname include:

- Julie Raque Adams (born 1969), U.S. politician
- Madison Raque, basketball player on the 2014–15, 2015–16, 2016–17, 2017–18 UNC Wilmington Seahawks women's basketball teams
- Norb Raque (fl. 1950s), basketball coach; see List of Bellarmine Knights men's basketball head coaches
- Senerisi Raque, rugby player for Fiji at the 2001 Rugby World Cup Sevens squads

== Characters ==
- Paul de Raque, a fictional character, the main character of the videogame Knights of the Temple: Infernal Crusade

== See also ==
- RAC (disambiguation)
- RACC (disambiguation)
- RAAC (disambiguation)
- RRAC
- Rack (disambiguation)
- RAK (disambiguation)
- raq (disambiguation)
- RACQ
