= RRAC (disambiguation) =

RRAC may refer to:

- Red River Athletic Conference, an NAIA college athletic conference in the U.S.
- Raozan R.R.A.C Model High School (Ramgati-Ramdhan-Abdul Bari Chowdhury School), Raozan, Chittagong District, Bangladesh
- Rodenticide Resistance Action Committee
- Ramnarian Ruia Autonomous College- College in Mumbai

== See also ==
- RAC (disambiguation)
- RACC (disambiguation)
- RAAC (disambiguation)
- Rack (disambiguation)
- RAK (disambiguation)
- raq (disambiguation)
- RACQ
