= Racking (disambiguation) =

Racking and other uses of Rack as a verb may refer to:

- Racking, the transfer of a liquid (such as wine) from one container to another
- readying a firearm to fire, as in the tap, rack, bang action sequence
- engaging or disengaging a circuit breaker
  - Remote racking system
- using a Rack (billiards) to arrange the balls in pool-like games
- a type of horse gait
  - Racking Horse Breeders' Association of America in Decatur, Alabama
  - Racking Horse World Celebration, a show by the above
- shoplifting clothes, in the slang of communities such as the Lo Lifes
- Racking (graffiti), the shoplifting of graffiti supplies
- Racking focus, a photography technique
- Hot racking, also hot bunking or hot bedding, the sharing of bunks in the military
- Racking bend, a knot for joining two ropes of different diameter
- Structural racking, deforming under shear stress
- Torturing someone on the rack

== See also ==
- Rack (disambiguation)
