= RAAC =

RAAC may refer to:

- Regional Assessment Appeal Court, Nova Scotia, Canada, concerned with property matters
- Reinforced autoclaved aerated concrete, a construction material
- Rowing Association of American Colleges, U.S. (1870–1894)
- Royal Australian Armoured Corps

== See also ==
- RAC (disambiguation)
- RACC (disambiguation)
- RRAC, Red River Athletic Conference
- Rack (disambiguation)
- RAK (disambiguation)
- Raq (disambiguation)
- RACQ, Royal Automobile Club of Queensland, Australia
