= Raq =

Raq may refer to:

== Aviation ==
- No. 610 Squadron RAF (codename RAQ), British Royal Air Force
- Rath Aviation (ICAO airline code: RAQ), see List of airline codes (R)
- Sugimanuru Airport (IATA airport code: RAQ), Raha, Muna, Southeast Sulawesi, Sulawesi, Indonesia

== Science and technology ==
- Cobalt RaQ, a 1U rackmount computer server product line
- Revised Attribution Questionnaire (r-AQ), a psychological self-assessment
- RAQ, initial prefix designation for the Q-25 drone, the Boeing MQ-25 Stingray

== Other uses ==
- RAQ, American rock band
- Raq, the pet dog of George Bramwell Evens, mascot of the Romany Society, and star of radio programmes
- Rarely Asked Questions, a monthly column in the magazine Analog Dialogue
- Régie des alcools du Québec (RAQ), the former name of the Société des alcools du Québec (SAQ)
- Réseau des services d'archives du Québec (RAQ), see List of Canadian archives associations
- Saam language (ISO 639 language code: raq)

== See also ==
- RAC (disambiguation)
- RACC (disambiguation)
- RAAC (disambiguation)
- RRAC
- Rack (disambiguation)
- RAK (disambiguation)
- RACQ
