= RACK (disambiguation) =

RACK may refer to:

- RACK, the former NASDAQ ticker symbol for Silicon Graphics International, formerly called Rackable Systems
- Risk-aware consensual kink
- RACK1, a protein of the eukaryotic 40S ribosomal subunit that binds protein kinase c

== See also ==
- Rack (disambiguation)
- Wrack (disambiguation)
