= Sea transport systems =

Ocean traffick

Sea transport systems in today's shipping market have evolved into three separate but closely connected segments: bulk shipping, liner shipping and specialized shipping. Although these segments belong to the same industry, each carries out different tasks and has a very different character.

Large homogeneous parcels such as iron ore, coal and grain are carried by the bulk shipping industry, small parcels of general cargo are carried by the liner shipping industry and specialised cargoes shipped in large volumes are transported by the specialized shipping industry. These three cargo streams create demand for bulk transport, liner transport and specialized transport. A major distinction is drawn between the fleets of ships owned by companies moving their own cargo in their own ships and the ships owned by independent shipowners and chartered to the cargo owners.

== Bulk shipping ==
The bulk shipping industry carries large parcels of raw materials and bulky semi-manufactures. This is a very distinctive business. Bulk vessels handle few transactions, typically completing about six voyages with a single cargo each year, so the average revenue depends on a dozen of negotiations per ship each year. In addition, service levels are usually low so little overhead is required to run the ships and organize the cargo.

== Liner shipping ==
The liner service transports small parcels of general cargo, which includes manufactured and semi-manufactured goods and many small quantities of bulk commodities. Because there are so many parcels to handle on each voyage, this is an organization-intensive business. In addition, the transport leg forms part of an integrated production operation, so speed, reliability and high service levels are important. With so many transactions the business relies on published prices, though nowadays the prices are negotiated with major customers as part of service agreement.

== Specialized shipping ==
Specialized shipping services transport difficult cargoes of which the five most important are cars, forest product, refrigerated cargo, chemicals and liquified gas. These trades fall somewhere between bulk and liner. Service provides in these trades invest in specialized ships and offer higher service levels than bulk shipping.

== Summary ==
The three segments of the shipping industry all carry cargo in ships but they face different tasks in terms of the value and volume of cargo, the number of transactions handled and the commercial systems employed.

== See also ==
- Roll-on/roll-off
- Roll trailer
