= Heaving line bend =

Type of bend knot

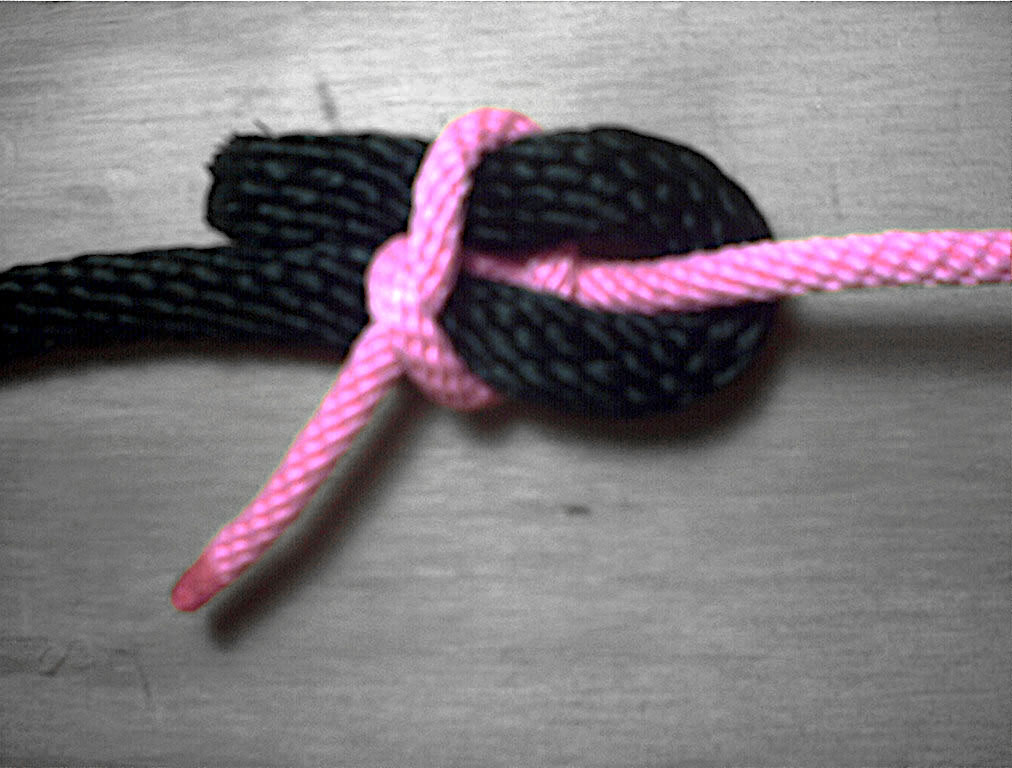
- Names: Heaving line bend, messenger-line bend
- Category: Bend
- Related: Sheet bend, Racking bend
- Typical use: To attach a lightweight line to a heavier line
- ABoK: #1463

The heaving line bend is a knot for securely joining two ropes of different diameter or rigidity. It is often used to affix playing strings to the thick silk eyes of an anchorage knot in some stringed instruments. In nautical use, the heaving line bend is used to connect a lighter messenger line to a hawser when mooring ships. It is knot number 1463 in The Ashley Book of Knots, and appeared in the 1916 Swedish knot manual Om Knutar.

The heaving line bend is similar to the sheet bend and the racking bend, and may be used to pass a thick rope to a distant receiver by first throwing the end of a thinner rope which may be weighted with a monkey fist or a heaving line knot.

== Tying steps ==
The heaving line bend is tied the same way as the sheet bend with one difference: the final crossing of the thin end is done in the opposite direction, so the thin end points away from the thin line, essentially in the same direction as the thick end, towards the thick line. This avoids jamming when the thin line is pulled to carry the thick end out of reach.

1. Make a bight in the larger line.
2. Pass the lighter line around the standing part of the bight.
3. Cross between the larger and the lighter line on the back side.
4. Finish by tucking the end between its turn around the standing part of the bight and that leg; pull tight.

== See also ==
- List of knots
- List of bend knots
