= Kenny Ailshie =

American horse trainer

- Born: November 27, 1948; Greene County, Tennessee, US
- Died: August 22, 2008 (aged 59); Greeneville, Tennessee, US
- Major wins/Championships: World Grand Championship in 1987; World Grand Championship in 1991; World Grand Championship in 1992; World Grand Championship in 1998; World Grand Championship in 2002; World Grand Championship in 2006

Honors
- Trainer of the Year in 1991

Significant horses
- Oil Stock, Oil Stock's Delight, The Finalizer, Unreal, Score at Halftime

Kenny Ailshie (November 27, 1948 – August 22, 2008) was an American horse trainer who specialized in Racking Horses. Ailshie won the World Grand Championship in the Racking Horse World Celebration 6 times, more than any other trainer. Alshie's son Keith and daughter Buffy have also won numerous Championships.

== Life and career ==
Ailshie was born on November 27, 1948, to Bon Lee and Anna Mae Ailshie and grew up in Greene County, Tennessee. His first job was training young horses for wages of $1 a day. Later he began spending time at a local trainer's stable and learned more about Racking Horses, which became his specialty. Ailshie eventually got a small training facility and began competing in horse shows. He rode and trained Tennessee Walking Horses in addition to Racking Horses. He did not do well because the horses he rode were of average quality and not the exceptional horses needed to win at national shows. In 1987 Ailshie was contacted by Larry and Carolyn Peters, a couple who owned Oil Stock, the previous year's World Grand Champion Racking Horse. At the time, no horse had won the World Grand Championship and returned to win it again. The Peters thought Oil Stock could do so and wanted Ailshie to take over his training from Jackie Barron, who had ridden him the previous year. Ailshie entered Oil Stock in the Racking Horse World Celebration and won the 1987 World Grand Championship. With the Peters' support, Ailshie rented a new 21-acre facility with option to buy and expanded it to ultimately house 55 horses in two barns. Ailshie was Trainer of the Year in 1991, the same year he won the World Grand Championship on Oil Stock's Delight, a son of Oil Stock, who was owned by the Clyde Creech family. The following year he and Oil Stock's Delight repeated their win. Ailshie won his fourth World Grand Championship in 1998, riding The Finalizer for the Clyde Creech family. Four years later in 2002, he rode Unreal, also owned by the Creeches, to the World Grand Championship. His final World Grand Championship was in 2006 on the horse Score at Halftime, owned by Denny Russell. Russell, who once worked as a stablehand for Ailshie, had bought the bay stallion only two weeks prior to the Celebration.

Ailshie and his wife Sara had a son, Keith, and daughter, Buffy. Both children followed their father into the horse industry. Keith was Trainer of the Year in 2001, when he won the World Grand Championship on The Pushoverture. Buffy was given the Trainer of the Year award in 1994. Her son Brandon, Kenny's grandson, was at age 4 the youngest person to ride unassisted in the Racking Horse World Celebration. In 2001 the Ailshie family had won over 20 World Championships. Kenny Ailshie died August 22, 2008. He was 59 years old. Ailshie was found dead in his home by a relative early in the morning. He had suffered a gunshot wound, and the police department's preliminary findings indicated that he had committed suicide. His family were at the Tennessee Walking Horse National Celebration when they were notified.

In 2017, Alshie's grandson Brandon won the Racking Horse World Grand Championship on Helter Skelter.
