= Arthur Beale =

Rope maker and chandler

Coordinates: 51°30′55″N 0°7′35.8″W

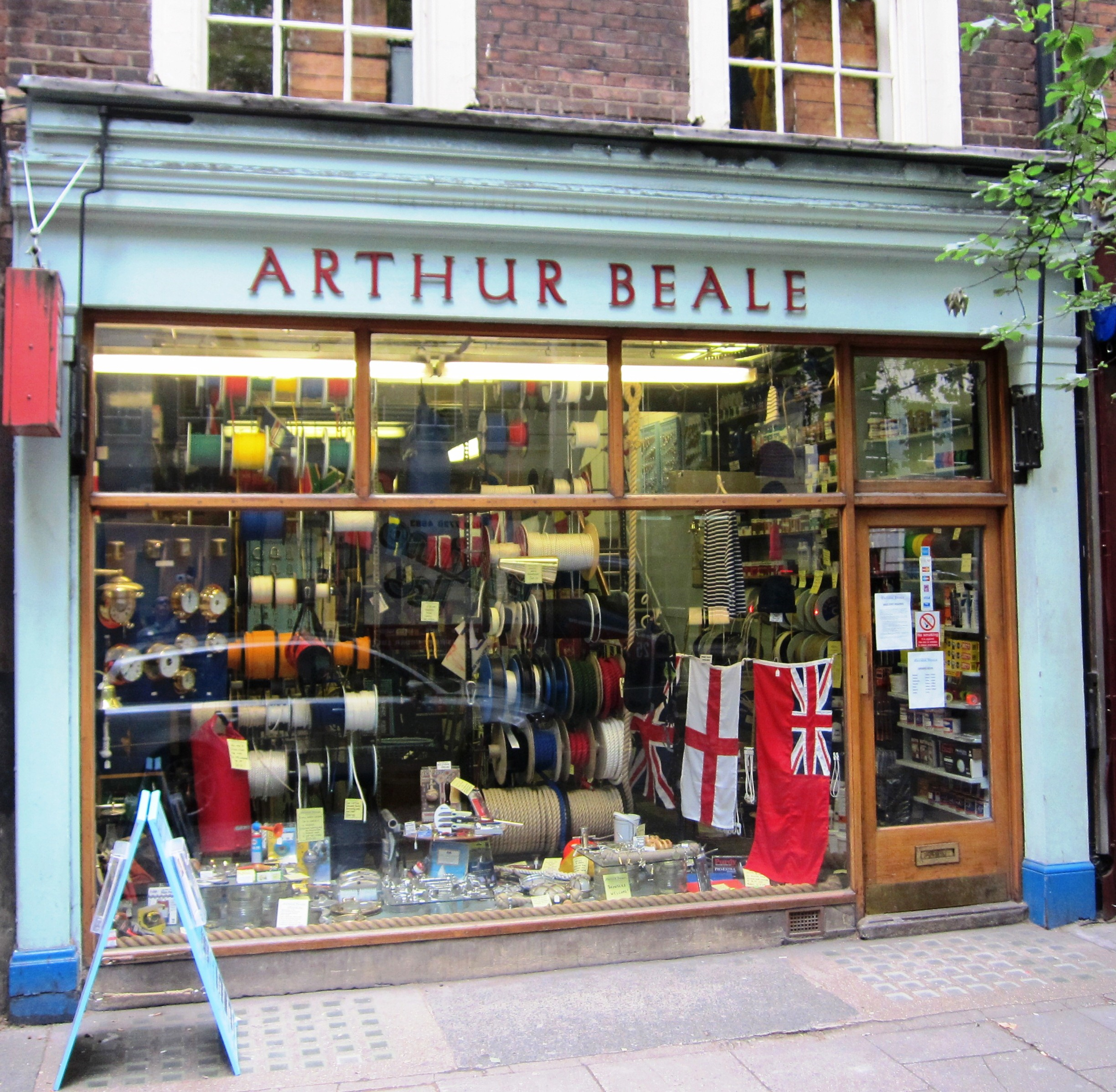

Arthur Beale is a yacht-chandler that stocks a wide variety of nautical equipment and accessories. The business started as the rope-maker John Buckingham by the nearby Fleet river in the 16th century and was based in premises in Bloomsbury until 2021. In the 19th century, they became known as the exclusive suppliers of climbing rope to the Alpine Club. They still make and stock a large variety of ropes and lines and so also supply theatrical rigging and ornamental ropes for decoration and crowd control. In 2021, following the COVID-19 pandemic, they announced that they would be moving the business online but with plans for a new retail location or format such as a Christmas pop-up shop.

== History ==
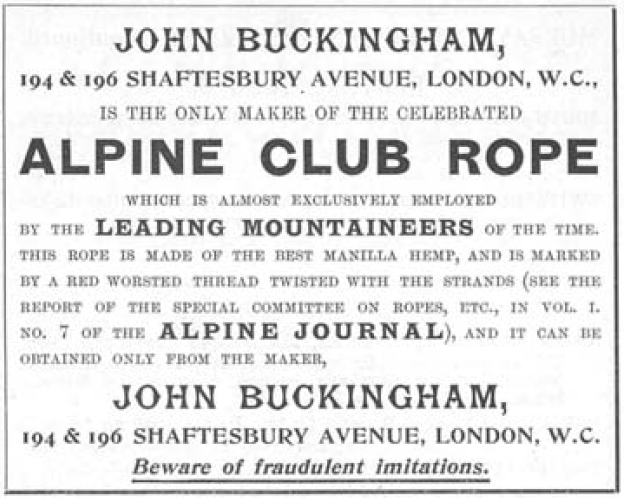
Advert in Whymper's Guides Advertiser in 1897

The business was founded around 1500 as a rope maker, doing business under the name John Buckingham. In the early 19th century, they had premises at number 6 in the Middle Row of St Giles—an impressive terrace in the middle of Broad Street—but had to move when this was demolished in 1843. They then operated from premises on Shaftesbury Avenue when John Buckingham and then the new proprietor, Arthur Beale, were exclusive suppliers of climbing rope to early members of the Alpine Club. This was made to the club's specification so that it was both light and strong, being made from three strands of manila hemp, treated to be rot proof and marked with a red thread of worsted yarn. This rope was used for British expeditions to Mount Everest and Antarctica. It also supplied ice axes to polar explorer, Ernest Shackleton; the flagpole for Buckingham Palace and rigging for escapologists and the window displays of Selfridges department store.

a monkey's fist with an eye splice, custom-made at Arthur Beale

The business now trades mainly as a yacht chandler, stocking and supplying nautical equipment such as a monkey's fist – a weighted ball of rope used for line-throwing. To support the retailing, they have a workshop downstairs, where they produce special orders for ropes and rigging. This business was declining but, in 2014, veteran sailor and theatrical chandler, Alasdair Flint, took over with business partner Gerry Jeatt with plans to revive it. The range of products was broadened to include nautical clothing, books and novelties such as ship's biscuits. Other new activities included courses and presentations, stands at boat shows and improved windows displays.

The COVID-19 pandemic depressed retail activity in central London and the business could not sustain the shop’s rental costs in Shaftesbury Avenue, and closed its doors in May 2021. In July 2021, a retail store opened in Portsmouth which offers a "Click and Collect at Sea" service.
