= Rack =

Rack or racks may refer to:

== Storage, support and transportation ==
- Amp rack, a piece of furniture in which amplifiers are mounted
- Autorack or auto carrier, for transporting vehicles in freight trains
- Baker's rack, for bread and other baked goods
- Bicycle rack:
  - Bicycle parking rack
  - Bicycle stand, for holding bicycles in service, storage, or transport
  - The luggage carrier of a bicycle
- Bustle rack, a type of storage bin mounted on armored fighting vehicles
- Clothes rack, or clothes horse
- Drum rack, part of a drum kit
- Drying rack, for clothing
- Ejector rack or hardpoint for attaching external loads to an aircraft
- Firearm rack
- Flat rack container, a type of railroad freight car
- Hatstand, also known as a coat rack, hall rack, or hat rack
- Hay rack, for feeding animals
- Laboratory drying rack, a for hanging and draining glassware
- Music rack or music stand, to hold sheet music for performance
- Newspaper rack, a newspaper vending machine
- Pallet racking, for storing palletised loads
- Pot rack for kitchen storage
- Roof rack, for a car top
- Shoe rack
- Spinner rack, a rotating frame for store merchandise
- Pipe rack, for supporting pipe or cable runs
- 19-inch rack or 23-inch rack, for computer and other electronic equipment
- Truck bed rack, a metal frame used to increase a truck bed's capacity

== Mechanics ==
- Power rack, a piece of weight training equipment
- The straight component of a rack and pinion pair
- Rack lift, an elevator which runs on vertical rails
- Rack railway, a train propelled using a toothed rail
- Rack slide, a type of linear bearing used to mount pull-out equipment in racks

== Media ==
- The Rack (album) (1991), by Dutch death metal band Asphyx
- The Rack (1915 film), an American silent drama
- The Rack (1956 film), a courtroom drama starring Paul Newman
- Rack (album) (2024) by American rock band Jesus Lizard
- "Racks" (song) (2011), by American rapper Y. C.

== People and characters ==
- Rack or Marrack, a fictional character in the American TV series Buffy the Vampire Slayer
- Edmund Rack (c.1735–1787), English writer
- Reinhard Rack (born 1945), Austrian politician
- Ricky Racks (born 1987), pseudonym of American songwriter Ricky Harrell, Jr
- Simon Rack, fictional galactic secret agent created by American writer L. James in 1974
- Tom Rack (born 1983), Canadian actor and writer
- Ursula Rack, polar historian

== Software ==
- Rack (web server interface), a Ruby API definition
- VCV Rack, a free software modular synthesizer

== Places and artifacts ==
- Rack Marsh, a nature reserve in Bagnor, England
- Rack Hill, a biological Site of Special Scientific Interest in Wiltshire, England
- Racks railway station, a former station in Dumfries and Galloway, Scotland

== Other uses ==
- Rackable Systems (NASDAQ symbol: RACK), former American computer manufacturer
- Rack or singlefoot, (racking), a horse gait
- Rack (climbing), the set of equipment carried up a climb
- Rack, a slang term for money, specifically £1,000
- Rack (billiards) or triangle, a frame for placing billiard balls in their starting positions
- Rack (torture)
- Rack of ribs, a cut of meat
- Rack of lamb, a cut of meat
- Rack-rent, a type of property rent
- Rack, a slang term for a women's breasts
- Racks and quandles, concepts in abstract algebra
- Argentine backbreaker rack, a professional wrestling move
- Rappel rack, a type of caving descender

== See also ==
- RACK (disambiguation)
- Wrack (disambiguation)
- Racking (disambiguation)
- Rack slide, a type of linear bearing used to mount pull-out equipment in racks
- Tzompantli, a display rack for human skulls in Mesoamerican cultures
- Rack-O, a Milton-Bradley card matching game
- Nordstrom Rack, an American off-price department store
- mod_rack, informal name of Ruby web server Phusion Passenger
- CSAR Rack 4-6-4RT a South African locomotive
- Sinclair Loading Rack, a former historic Sinclair Oil structure in Oklahoma
- Rack rate, the published full list price of a hotel room
- Rack striking, a way of playing a striking clock
- Rack and snail, a mechanism used in some striking clocks
- Rack tom, a variant of tom drum
- List of rack railways
