= Racking bend =

Knot for joining two ropes of different diameter

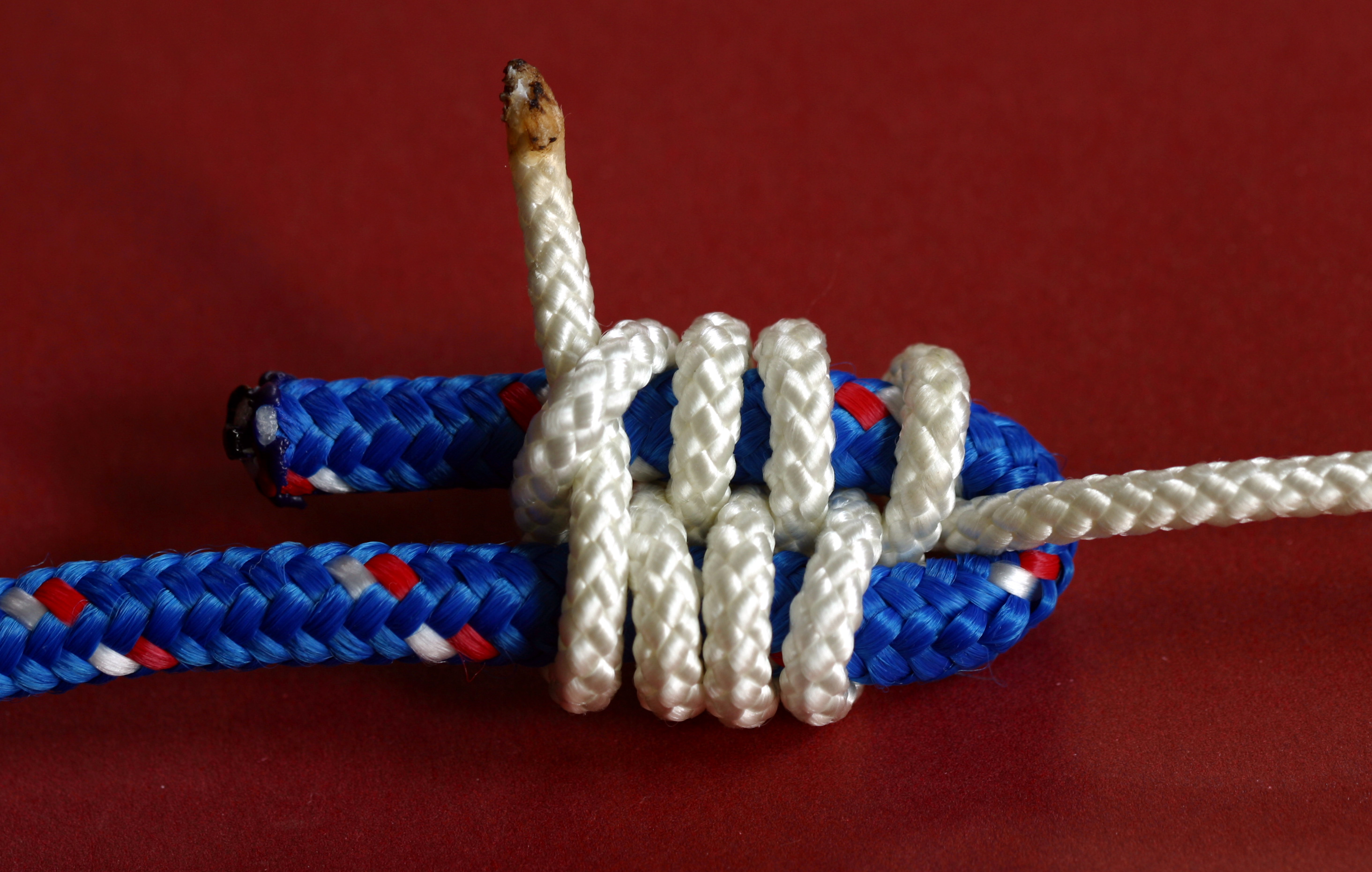
- Category: Bend
- Typical use: Joining two ropes of widely different diameter
- ABoK: #1462

The racking bend is a knot for joining two ropes of different diameter. "Racking" refers to the figure eight weaving that binds the bight of the larger rope together.

It serves a somewhat similar purpose as a Sheet bend, a Double sheet bend or a Heaving line bend, and may be used to throw a thick line over with the help of a thinner line at the end of which there may be a weight such as a Monkey fist or a Heaving line knot.

== See also ==
- List of bend knots
- List of knots
