= Roof rack =

Bars secured to the roof of an automobile

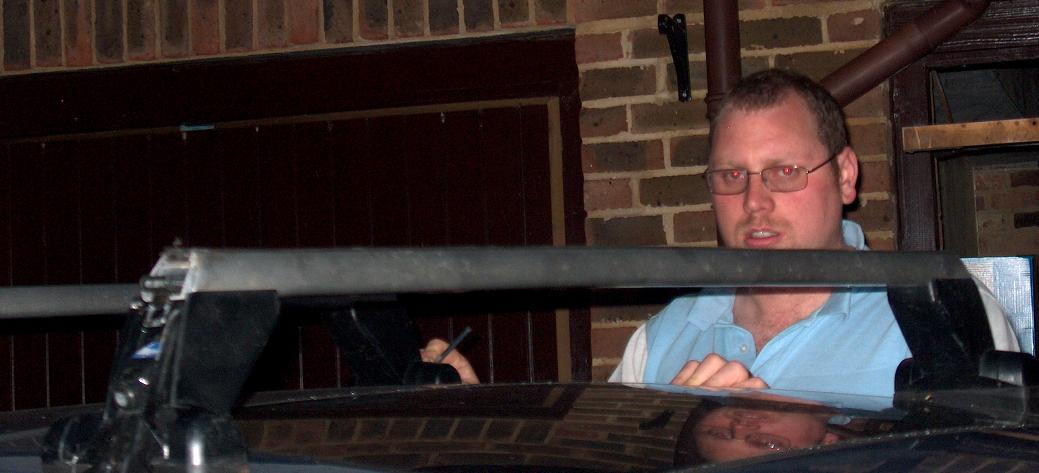
Fixing a roof rack to a motor car

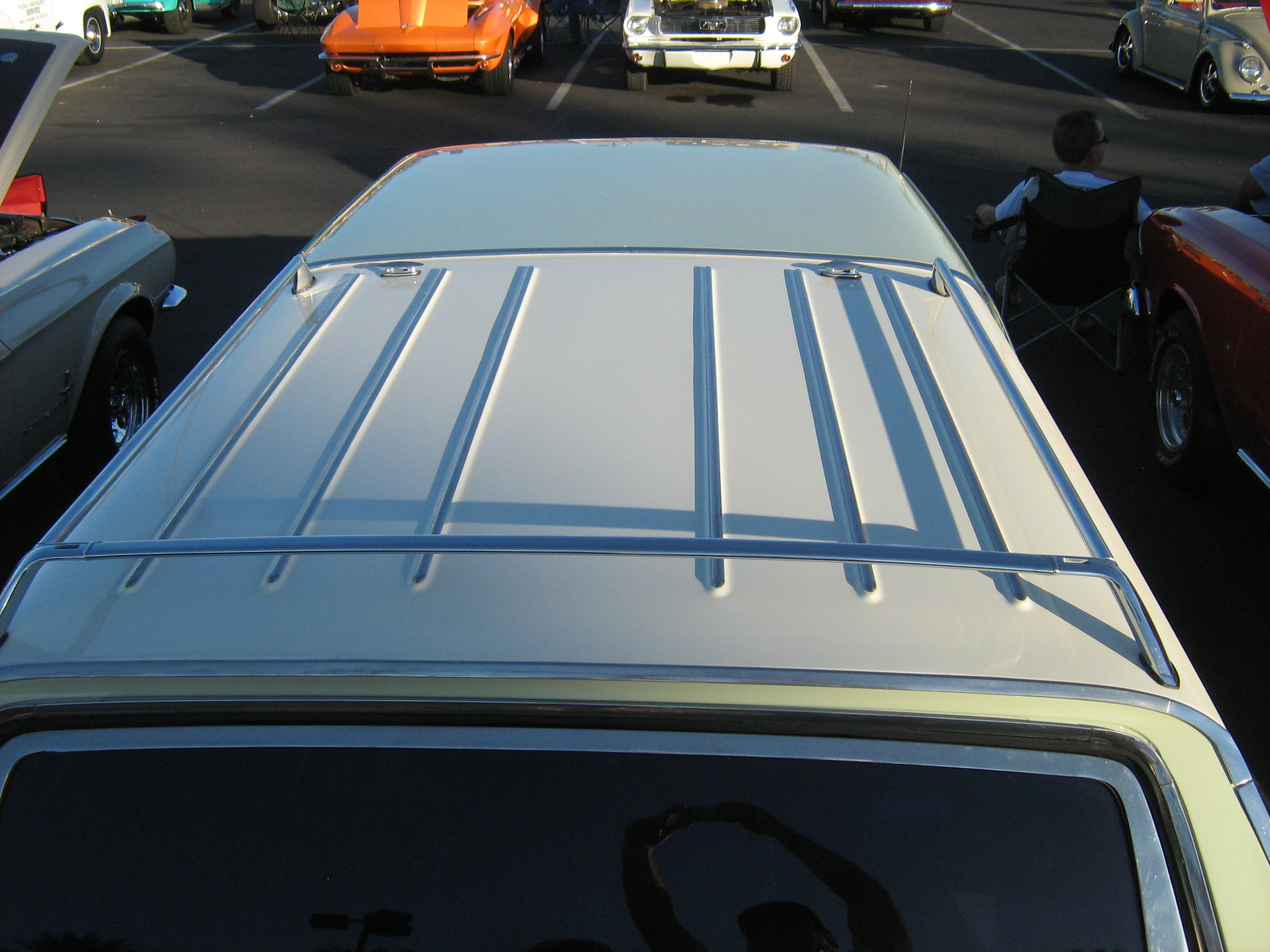
Factory-installed roof rack on a station wagon

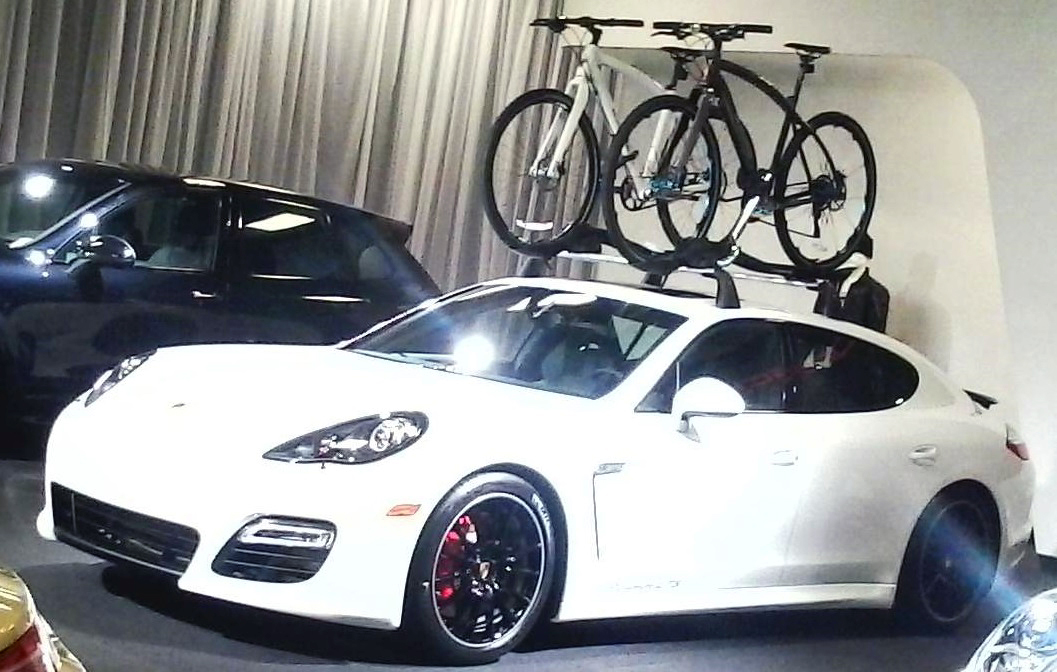
Two bicycles on a removable roof rack (bicycle carrier)

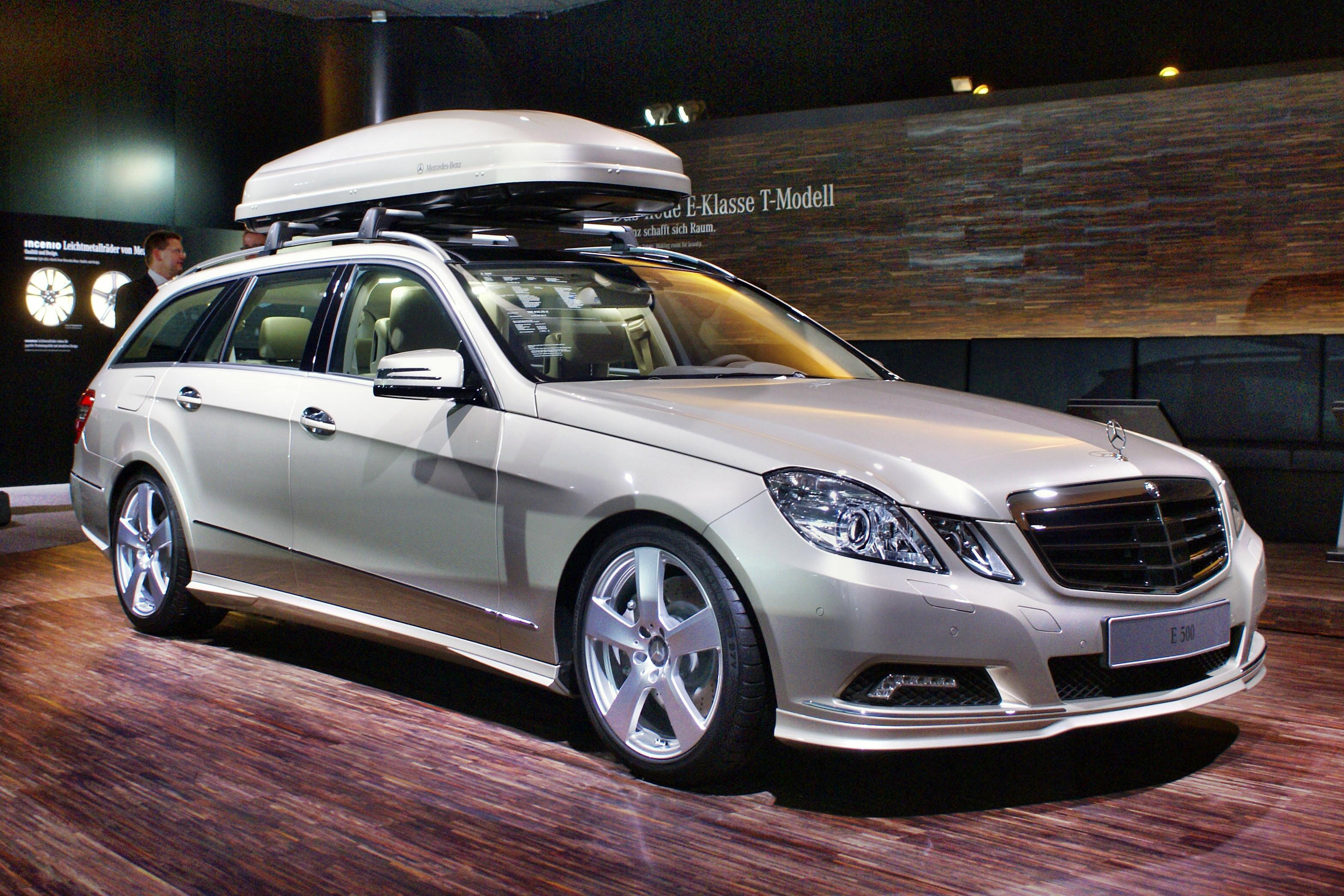
Enclosed car top carrier attached to a factory-installed roof rail

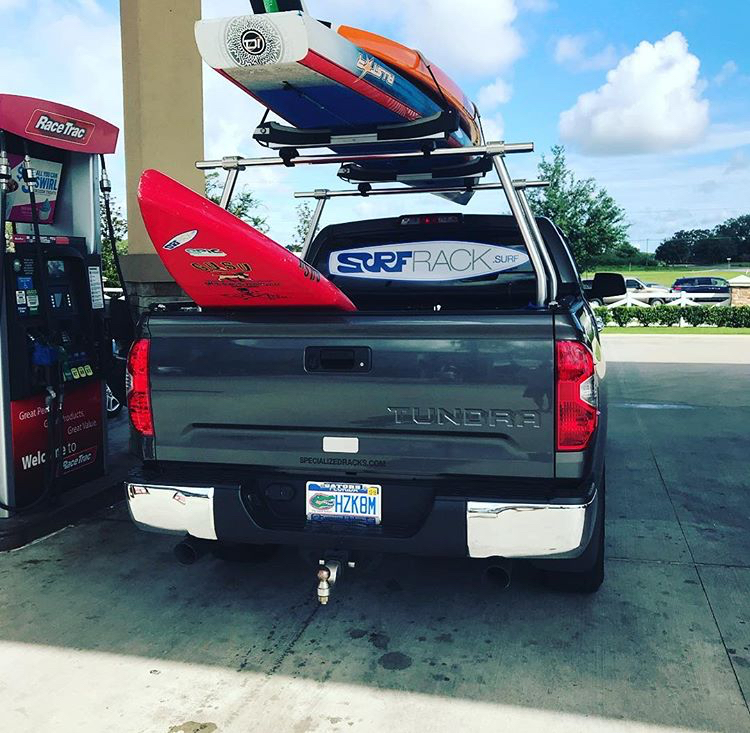
Specialized Racks over a pickup bed

A roof rack is a set of bars secured to the roof of an automobile. It is used to carry bulky items such as luggage, bicycles, canoes, kayaks, skis, or various carriers and containers.

They allow users of an automobile to transport objects on the roof of the vehicle without reducing interior space for occupants or the cargo area volume limits, such as in the typical car's trunk design. These include car top weatherproof containers; some are designed for specific cargo such as skis or luggage.

== History ==
There is a long history of the use of roof racks and their designs.

Until the late 1970s, almost all regular passenger automobiles had rain gutters. These gutters are formed by the welded flange (raised rim or lip) on the left and right sides of the car's metal roof panel. This made attaching an accessory or aftermarket roof rack a relatively simple process.

The first mass production cars without any visible rain gutters were the 1975 AMC Pacer and Chevrolet Monza. Other vehicles were introduced on the market with hidden rain gutters during the 1980s, and by 1990, cars with external rain gutters were becoming rare.

Roof rack suppliers developed new products designed to attach to various types of automobile roofs securely.

== Types ==
The most common components of a roof rack system are towers, fitting pieces (for attaching towers to a specific vehicle), crossbars, and gear mounts.

Automobile roof racks are split into different types, depending on the vehicle roof:

- Rain Gutter - older roof racks were usually mounted directly to the gutter surrounding the roof line.
- Bare Roof - many modern vehicles that do not have gutters can have a roof rack installed by attaching hooks to the top of the door frames.
- Fixed Point - some automobiles have fittings for proprietary racks that mate with reinforced roof lugs or have pre-threaded screwholes.
- Side Rails - vehicles with factory-installed rails, which may be flush against the roof or raised off of the top, running front-to-back on the roof
- Factory Bars - other vehicles have a factory-installed permanent roof rack.

There are many factors in the selection and use of roof racks. Some of these include their weight and strength, the profile for loading and unloading, and any available accessories.

Roof racks increase air resistance and in the US, roof racks increased overall fuel consumption by approximately 1%. Due to greater wind resistance, roof racks may increase wind noise on the highway. Mounting the roof rack backward may reduce air resistance. Some bars are designed with a lower drag coefficient or have a wind deflector at the front to reduce this problem.

When installing roof racks, it is essential to load the bars properly per the owner's manual. When driving on the road, one needs to load the allowed weight minus the weight of the roof rack kit. If one plans to use the roof racks for off-road driving, the allowed weight should be divided by 2, and this will be the maximum amount to be carried on the roof racks in such driving conditions.

A truck bed rack is a derivation of a roof rack designed to be installed over the bed of a pickup truck. The construction of a bed rack features tall tubes (legs) that allow the rack platform to be higher above the bed surface and leave space for cargo inside the bed. Pickup truck racks form an extended cargo platform that allows transportation of oversized items. They are used in construction and recreation as a base for various work, sports, and recreational gear such as ladders, surfboards, tents, etc.

== Types and modifications ==
A roof rack should be very sturdy, versatile in use, and produce minimal wind noise while driving. Installing a roof rack does not require a general operating permit (ABE). It does not need to be recorded in the vehicle registration documents.

Types:

- A standard roof rack typically consists of metal crossbars placed parallel to each other and usually mounted perpendicular to the direction of travel.
- A bicycle carrier is a device for transporting bicycles.
- A roof box (also called a car top carrier) is a flat, elongated, streamlined box made of rigid material that is attached to the vehicle roof using a base mount on the roof rails or on the roof rack.
- A ski rack, which is usually mounted on the roof, allows skis to be secured parallel. With rear-mounted ski racks, the skis are inserted vertically into a clamping device.

Roof racks have been used on vehicles for decades, so they are not new. Paradoxically, roof racks are much more often included as standard equipment on vehicles such as vans and passenger vehicles, which will use them least often, since they already have large cargo spaces; unlike smaller vehicles.

A roof tent can also be mounted on the roof rails. A roof tent is an accessory that can be installed on the roof or on the vehicle’s sleeping platform, allowing users to sleep in relative safety and comfort above the vehicle while leaving the interior cargo space free. Roof tents are produced in various sizes, but most are designed to comfortably accommodate two adults.

== See also ==
- List of auto parts
