= Racking Horse Breeders' Association of America =

- Abbreviation: RHBAA
- Formation: 1971
- Purpose: Registration of Racking Horses
- Location: Decatur, Alabama
- Services: Registration, membership
- Website: rackinghorse.com

The Racking Horse Breeders' Association of America (RHBAA) is the original registry for the Racking Horse breed. It was formed in 1971 in Decatur, Alabama and is still located there.

== History ==
The RHBAA was founded in April 1971 in Decatur, Alabama, and was recognized as an association by the USDA in May of the same year. It was organized by a group of horsemen who were interested in promoting a gaited horse that could be shown without the large action devices used on other breeds such as the Tennessee Walking Horse. There was also an interest in getting away from soring and violations of the Horse Protection Act which had been passed in 1970. The RHBAA began with the stated goal of promoting and preserving the attributes of the Racking Horse, as well as providing opportunities for amateur owners who were training their own horses with little or no professional help.

== Registration ==
As of 2016, the RHBAA has two methods of registering horses. The first is pedigree registration, by which a foal from a mare and stallion that are themselves registered is given registration. The mare, stallion and foal must all be blood-typed, however. The second method is open registration, meaning that any horse meeting standards for temperament, gait and conformation may be registered after an evaluation by a licensed commissioner. Adult horses may be ridden for their evaluation, but foals are shown on a loose lead rope. Approximately 80,000 horses have been registered.

== Competition ==
The RHBAA holds multiple shows throughout the year, mostly in Alabama and Tennessee. The two largest shows are the Spring Celebration, held annually in April, and the World Celebration, held in late September. Both take place at the Celebration Arena in Priceville, Alabama. The World Celebration is the larger of the two, with over 170 classes and approximately 1,000 horses, and is the final show of each season. The RHBAA also has programs for amateur, youth, professional, and female riders and exhibitors, as well as a futurity program for young horses. There is also a versatility program for adult horses that compete in non-traditional competition such as judged trail rides.
