= Heaving line knot =

Class of knot used to add weight to the end of a rope to make it easier to throw

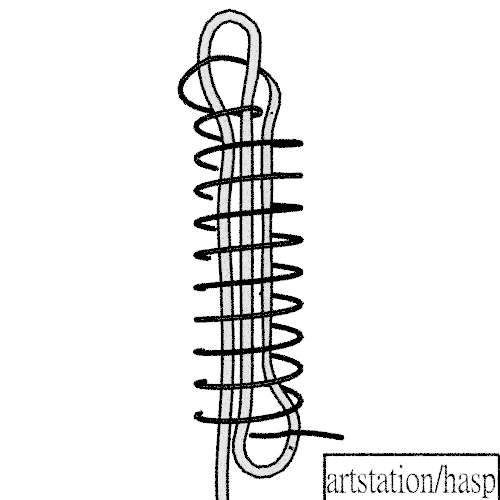
- Category: Stopper
- Releasing: Non-jamming
- Typical use: To serve as a weight, making a rope easier to throw
- ABoK: #538

Stopper knot
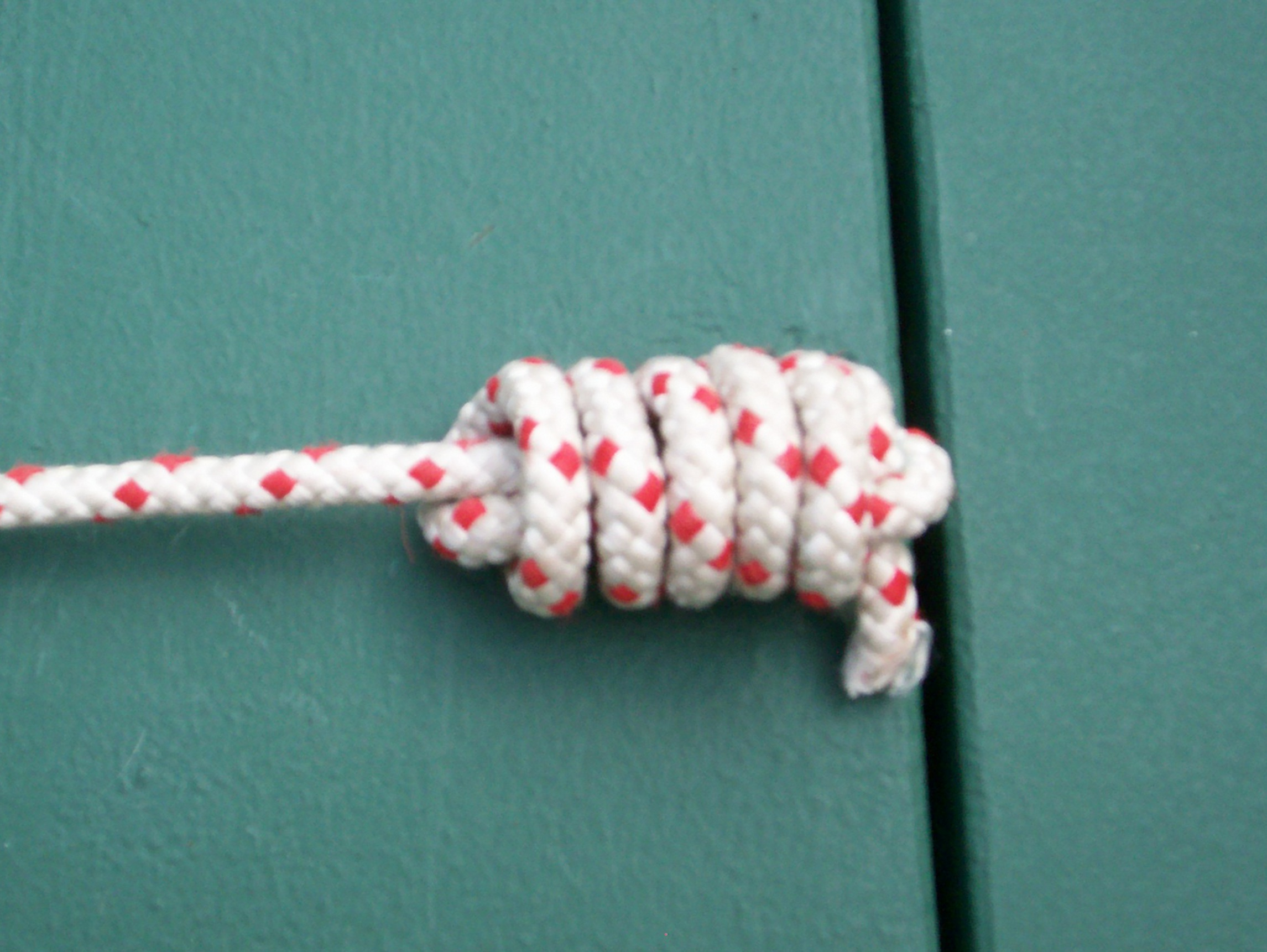
- Names: Stopper knot, Franciscan knot, monk's knot, Heaving line knot
- Category: Stopper
- Related: Stevedore knot, Double overhand knot
- Releasing: Non-jamming
- Typical use: To serve as a weight, making a rope easier to throw
- ABoK: #2004

A heaving line knot is a family of knots which are used for adding weight to the end of a rope, to make the rope easier to throw. In nautical use, a heaving line knot is often tied to the end of a messenger line, which is then used for pulling a larger rope, such as a hawser. There are several distinct knots which all share the common name, heaving line knot. The monkey fist is a well-known heaving line knot.

== Tying Stopper knot ==
Make a bight in the tail end of the rope. Wrap the working end around the tail toward the bight end, with multiple turns. Complete the knot by passing the tail end through the bight loop.

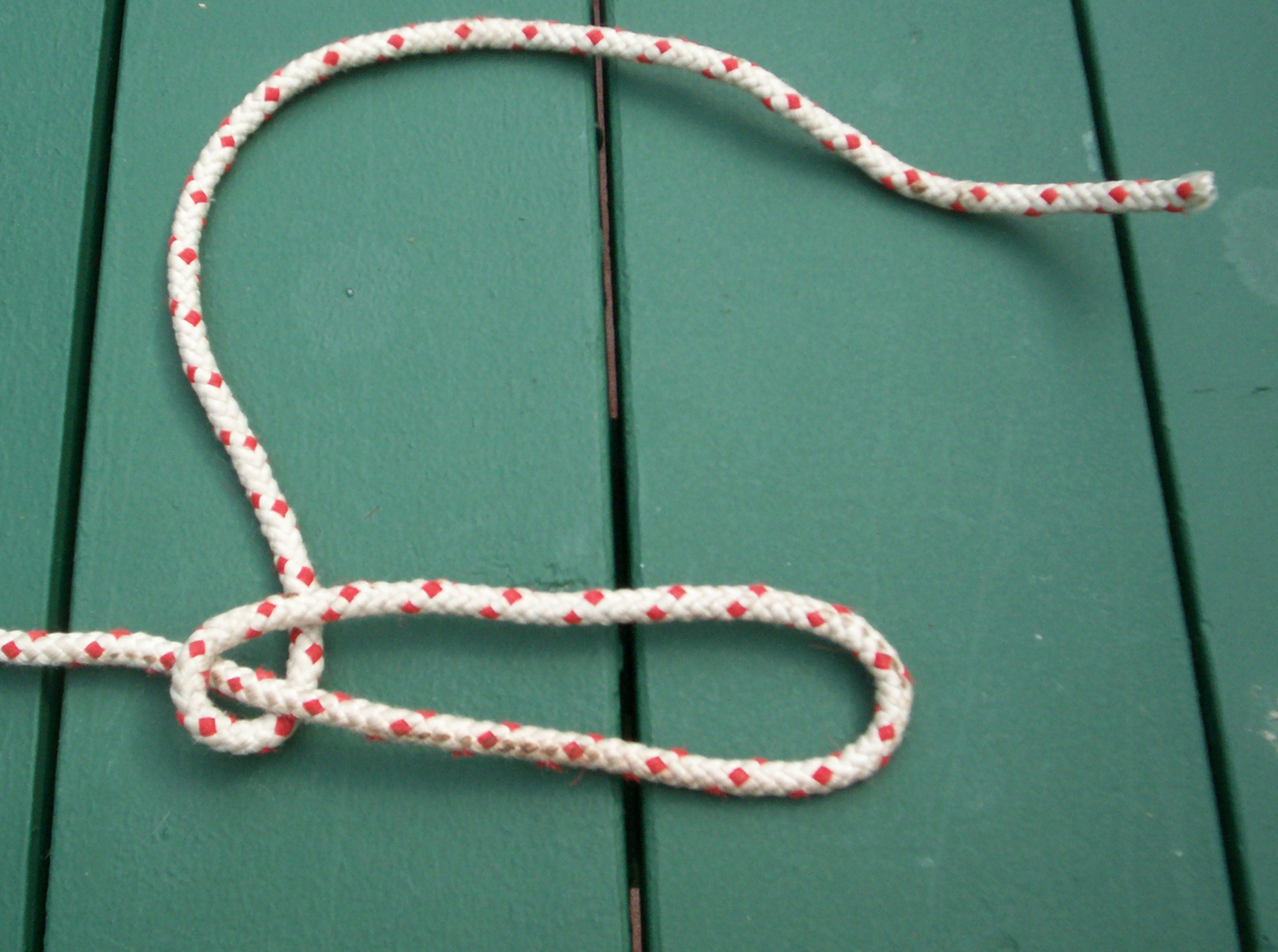
Make a bight

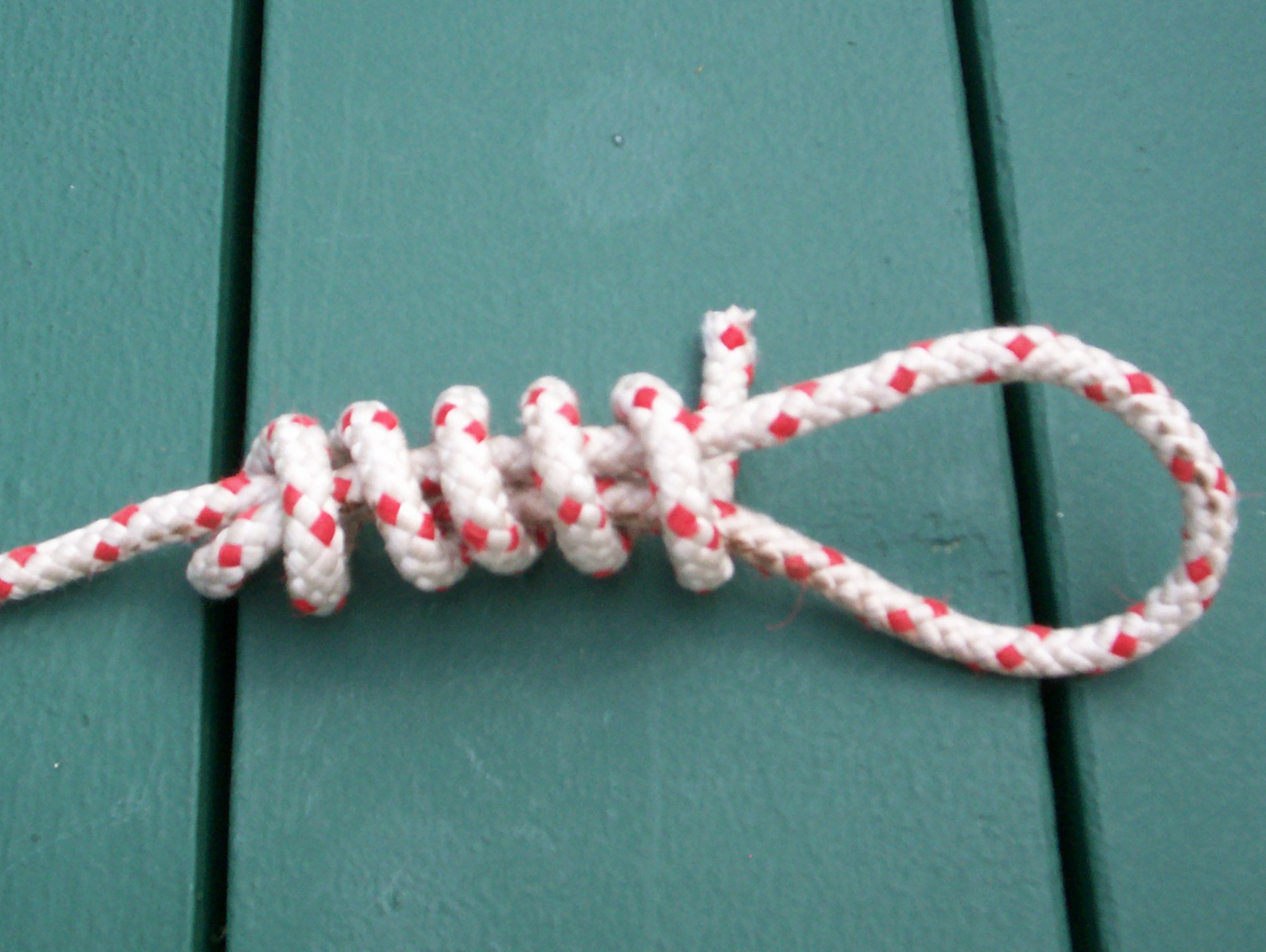
Wrap the working end around

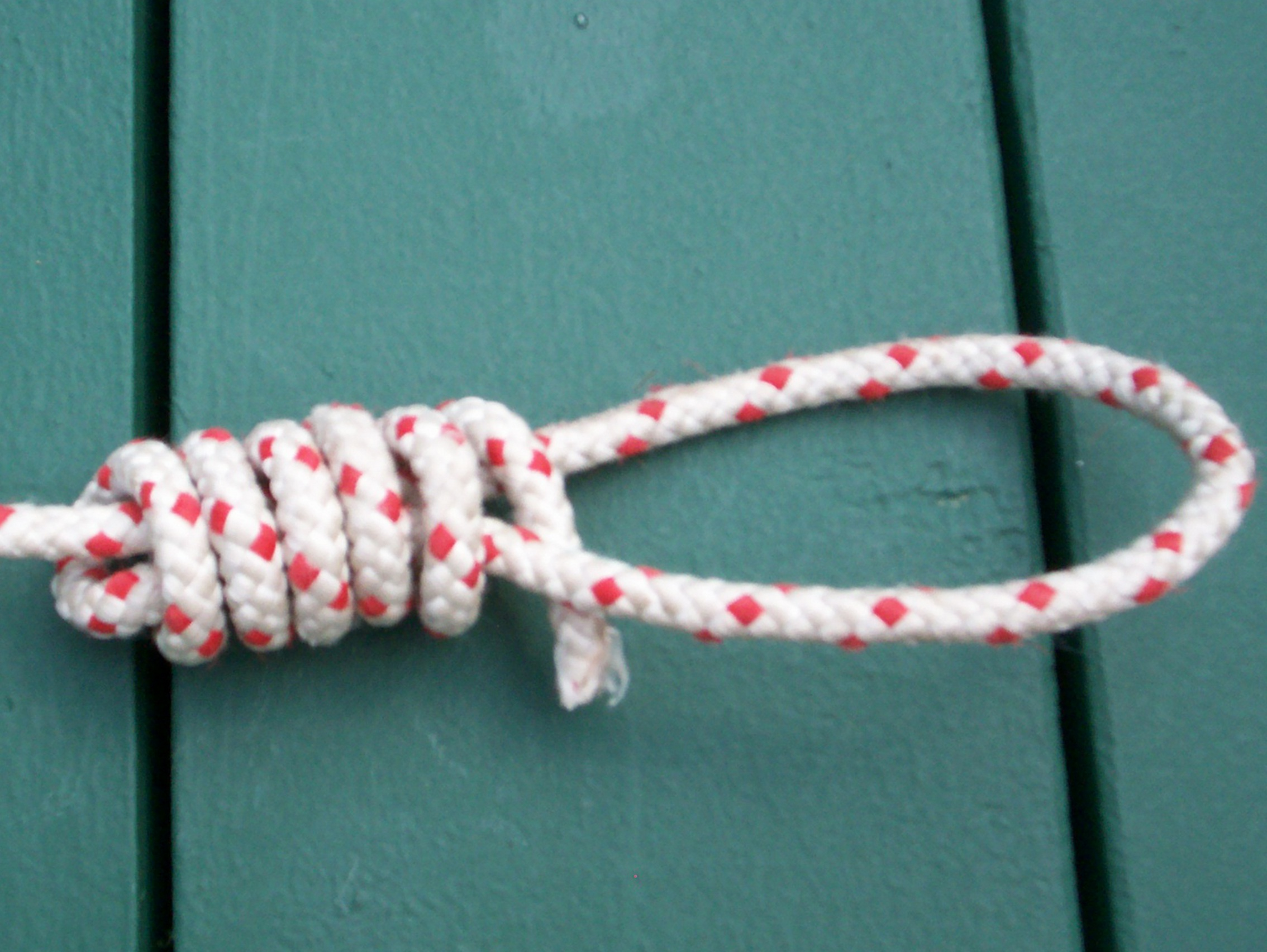
Put the end through the bight

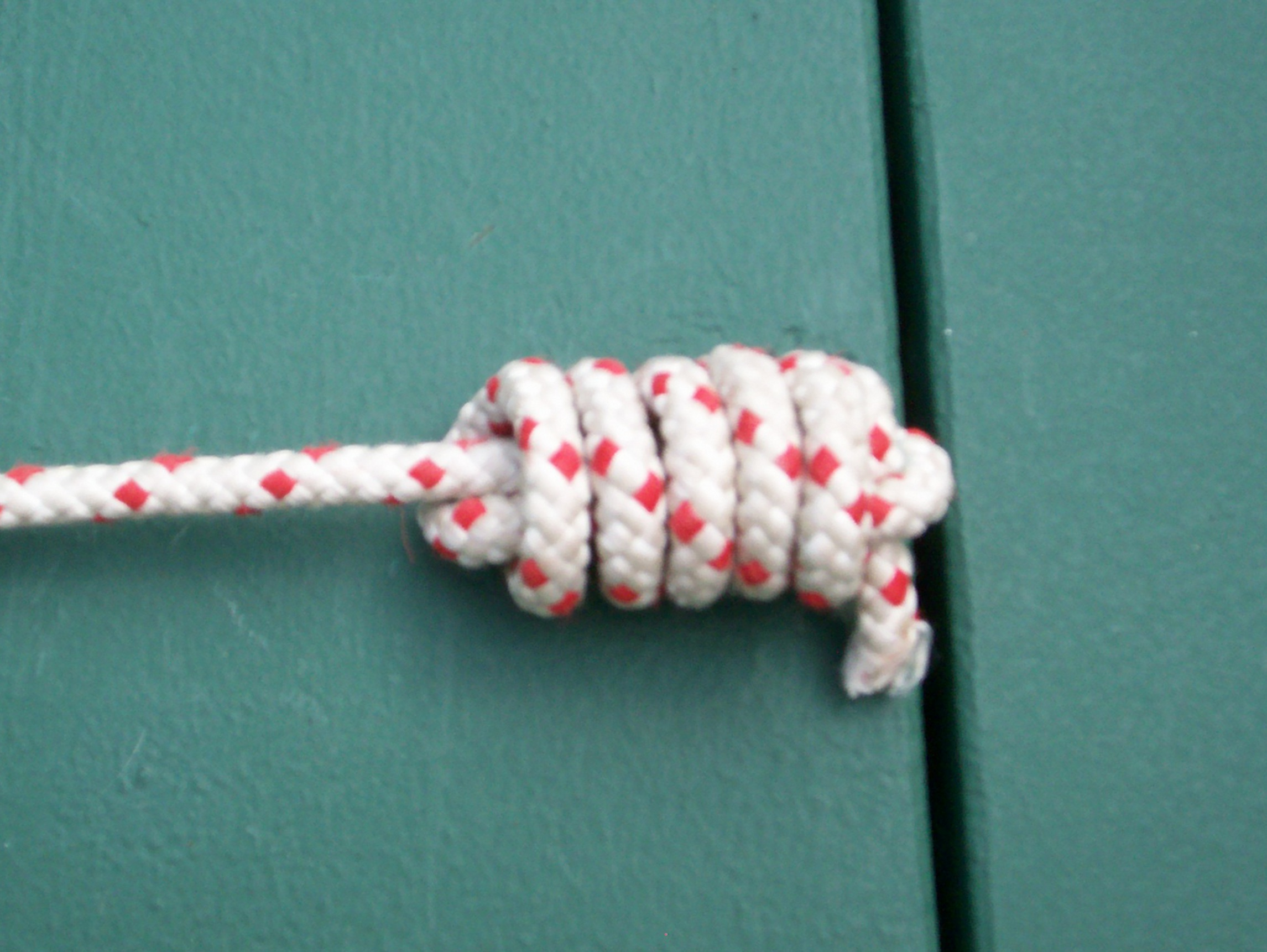
Tighten by pulling on the standing part to close the bight

== Similar knots ==
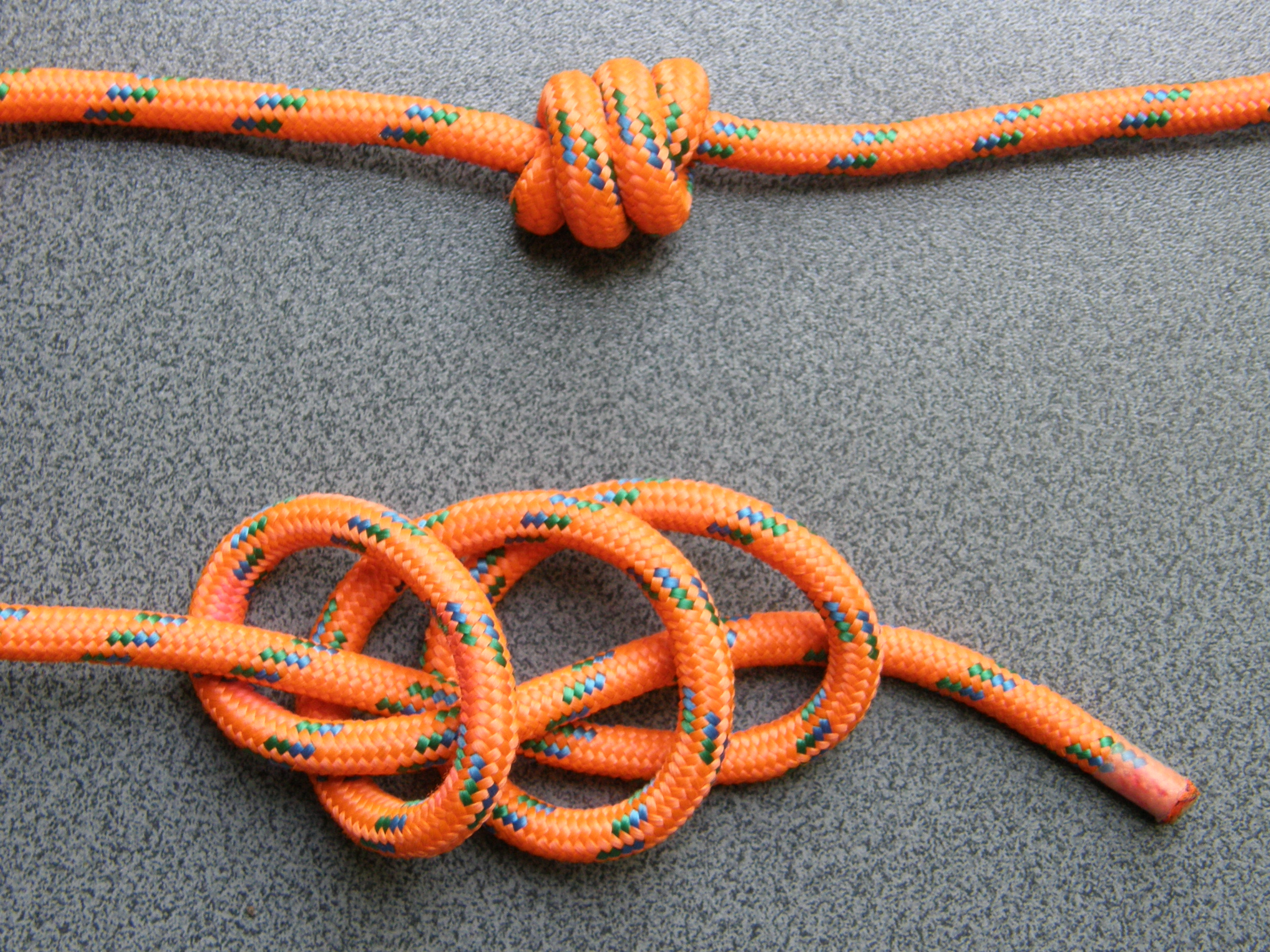
ABOK #2203

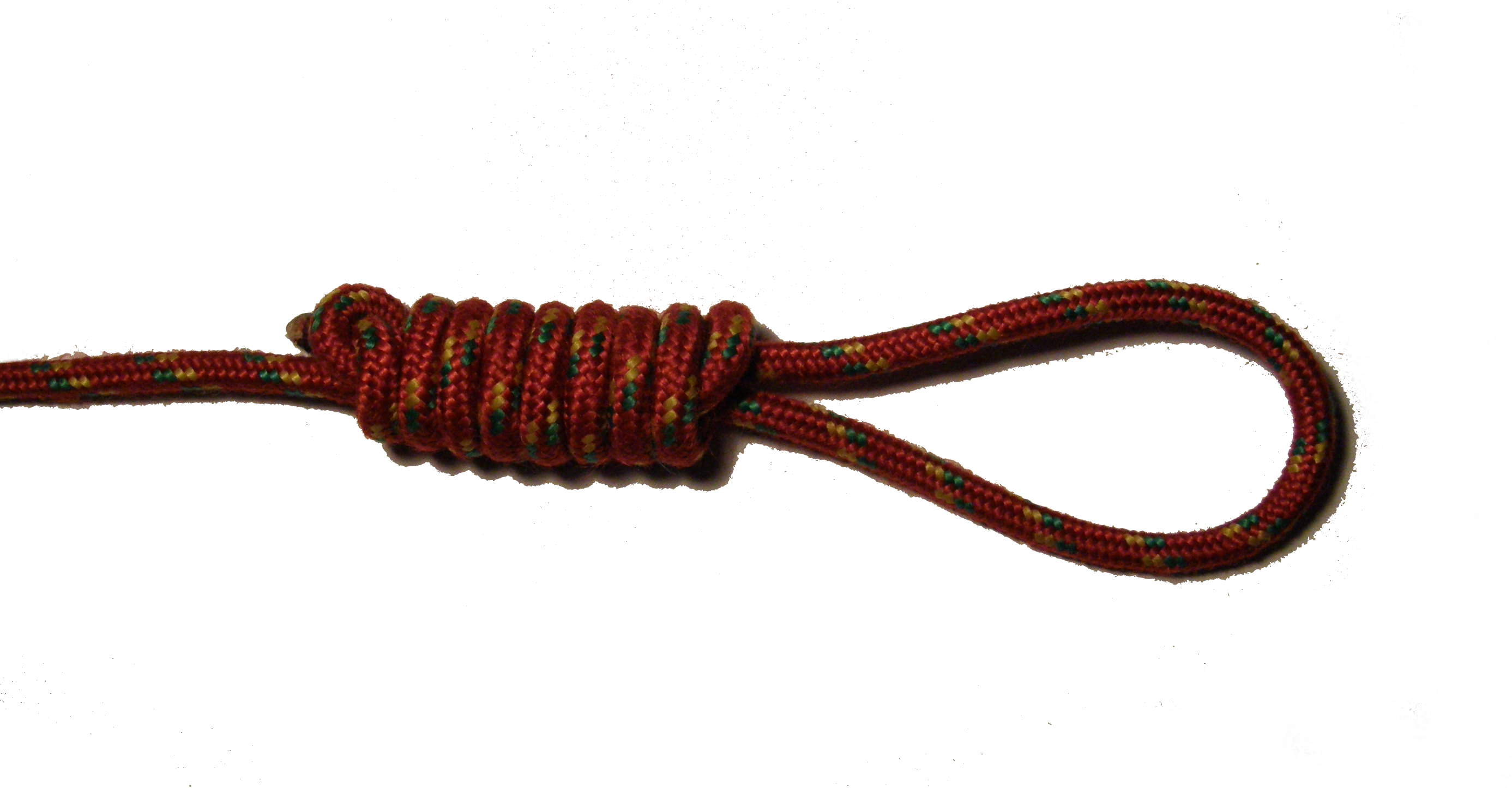
Hangman's knot

ABOK #427
Scout coil

== See also ==
- List of knots
- Hangman's knot
- Heaving line bend – Type of bend knot
