= Racking Horse =

American breed of horse

- Other names: RH, Racker
- Country of origin: Alabama, United States

Traits
- Weight: 1000 lbs
- Height: 15.2 hands (62 inches, 157 cm)
- Color: Black, chestnut, bay, gray, palomino, roan
- Distinguishing features: Tall, lean build; long, straight head; racking gait

The Racking Horse is a horse breed derived from the Tennessee Walking Horse, recognized by the USDA in 1971. It is known for a distinctive singlefoot gait. In 1971, the Racking Horse Breeders' Association of America, headquartered in Decatur, Alabama, was formed as the breed registry. Its goal is to preserve the breed in a natural state with little or no artificial devices that enhance gait. The horse's tail is naturally raised without nicking or tail sets. Some classes allow special shoes that enhance action, and a relatively newer class allows the use of chains, six ounces and under as action devices. The practice of soring, illegal under the Horse Protection Act of 1970, is also seen within the Racking Horse world. Since the breed's inception, about 80,000 Racking Horses have been registered, with the largest populations located in the US states of Alabama and Tennessee.

== Characteristics ==
The Racking Horse is a light riding horse, standing an average of 15.2 hands (62 inches, 157 cm) high and weighing around 1,000 pounds (450 kg). Overall, the Racking Horse is described as "attractive and gracefully built". The neck is long, the shoulders and croup sloping and the build overall well-muscled.

According to the breed standard, the Racking Horse should have slim legs, with good bone and feet large enough to preclude lameness. The head should be "intelligent and neat" with a straight profile preferable. The ears should prick alertly and the eyes should be large, clear and bright.

Colors accepted by the breed registry include all solid equine coat colors and roan. Racking Horses are also commonly seen in colors created by dilution genes, such as dun, cream and champagne. Some horses may also have body markings. Pinto Racking Horses may be double-registered as Spotted Saddle Horses. The breed is known for its ambling gait, a four-beat intermediate-speed gait known as the rack or sometimes single-foot, which it performs in addition to the four-beat walk (called the 'show walk' in breed-specific competition) and canter. The latter gait is not performed at breed-specific horse shows. When assessing the rack, judges place greater weight on correct movement and speed, rather than extreme elevation.

The rack may range in speed from 8 miles an hour in pleasure or style racking, up to as fast as 30 mph in speed racking. It is similar to the running walk of the Tennessee Walking Horse, but with more collection, and without a head nod. Most Racking Horses have two distinct speeds within the rack.

The temperament of the Racking Horse is described as "gentle, intelligent and affectionate". They are typically calm and laid back, but as with any breed of horse, temperament of individuals may vary.

== History ==
The ancestors of the Racking Horse were first bred on southern plantations prior to the American Civil War. They could be ridden comfortably for hours because of their smooth, natural gait. They were also bred for a good disposition, intelligence, and versatility. Their development was similar to that and in some cases linked to that of the Tennessee Walking Horse, also popular in the southeastern US. In the late 1800s, horse shows became increasingly popular in the southeastern United States, as an alternative to the gambling associated with horse racing. Racking Horses were most commonly seen at small shows, although they were also seen at some larger ones. They did not have their own breed association, however, and were often shown as a type of Tennessee Walking Horse.

In 1971, Racking Horse enthusiasts formed their own group, the Racking Horse Breeders' Association of America (RHBAA), and their breed was recognized by the United States Department of Agriculture as separate from the Tennessee Walking Horse the same year. However, many horses registered as Racking Horses were crosses between Racking and Walking Horses, as it was difficult to find breeding stock. In 1975, the Racking Horse was designated the official state horse of Alabama.

The first Racking Horse stallion to be syndicated was the 1975 World Grand Champion, Bentley's Ace. Trained and owned by natives of Arab, Alabama, he cost $350 as a colt and after his win was syndicated for $100,000.

Two stallions who became well known in the early days of the association were EZD Falcon Rowdy and Speck. EZD Falcon Rowdy was a dappled buckskin owned and ridden by John Demetris. He was noted for his good conformation, and he won two world championships in speed racking, in 1976 and 1983. He was a popular sire as well.

Speck, owned by Robert Skimehorn, was a red roan stallion who won 14 world championships in speed racking and was also a very influential sire. Although Speck died in 2000 as the result of a stroke, his and EZD Falcon Rowdy's bloodlines are still influencing the Racking Horse breed today.

Tennessee Walking Horses have continued to have an influence on modern Racking Horses. Many notable Racking Horses are a result of crossbreeding between the two, including many World and World Grand Champions. In the mid-1990s the RHBAA tried to stop dual registration of horses with their association and the Tennessee Walking Horse Breeders' and Exhibitors' Association, but it failed because there were not enough Racking stallions to sire foals. In the early 2000s, popularity of the Racking Horse went down and many distinct bloodlines died out or became closely related, leading to inbreeding. To counteract this, the RHBAA has reopened the registry to horses that meet breed standards for height, conformation, and gait. Some breeds often eligible for this are the Tennessee Walking Horse, Standardbred, Kentucky Mountain Saddle Horse and Rocky Mountain Horse. Purebred American Saddlebreds, however, are ineligible for RHBAA registration, although half-Saddlebreds may be registered if they meet the standard.

== Uses ==
The Racking Horse may be shown in saddle seat or western tack and attire, as well as in driving. Horses are shown in a long, natural mane and tail, but for saddle seat classes, the horse will have ribbons braided in the mane and forelock. It is also sometimes shown in hand, or in trail obstacle classes.

The Racking Horse Breeders' Association of America was originally formed as a vehicle for the promotion of horses shown without the artificial and extreme devices often seen in Tennessee Walking Horse and other gaited breed showing. However, the Racking Horse is one of the breeds often harmed by the inhumane practice of soring, prohibited at the federal level by the Horse Protection Act of 1970. Soring is an abusive practice used to accentuate the gaits of breeds such as the Tennessee Walking Horse and Racking Horse, in order to gain an unfair advantage in competition. The RHBAA operates in conjunction with a Horse Industry Organization (HIO) to inspect horses before shows and sales.

The two largest shows for the Racking Horse are the Spring Celebration, held annually in April, and the World Celebration, held in late September. Both are held at the Celebration Arena in Priceville, Alabama.

The Racking Horse is also used as a trail and pleasure horse, and the RHBAA has a versatility program in place through which Racking Horses can earn awards by participating in a variety of activities, including endurance riding.
