= Royal Automobile Club (disambiguation) =

Royal Automobile Club may refer to:

- Royal Automobile Club, a British private club of automobile enthusiasts
  - Royal Automobile Club Foundation, a British motoring advocacy group
- Royal Automobile Club of Australia, an Australian motoring organisation, headquartered in Sydney, New South Wales
- Royal Automobile Club of Belgium, a Belgian automobile association
- Royal Automobile Club of Tasmania, an Australian motoring club and mutual organisation
- Royal Automobile Club of Queensland, an Australian motoring club and mutual organisation
- Royal Automobile Club of Spain, a Spanish automobile association
- Royal Automobile Club of Victoria, an Australian motoring club and mutual organisation
- Royal Automobile Club of Western Australia, an Australian motoring club and mutual organisation
- RAC (company), a British company supplying products and services for motorists, formerly owned by the British Royal Automobile Club
- Royal Automobile Club (Sweden), a Swedish association for car owners
