= Wrack =

Wrack may refer to:

- wrack (mathematics), a concept in knot theory
- wrack (seaweed), several species of seaweed
- beach wrack, organic material deposited at high tide on beaches.
- Wrack, a novel by James Bradley (Australian writer)
- Charlie Wrack (1899–1979), English footballer
- Darren Wrack (born 1976), English footballer
- Matt Wrack (born 1962), British firefighter and trade unionist
- Wrack, the leading broodmare sire in North America in 1935
- Wrack (video game), A first person shooter video game made by Final Boss Entertainment

== See also ==
- Rack (disambiguation)
