= Celebration Arena =

Indoor arena in Priceville, Alabama

Coordinates: 34.5018°N 86.8663°W

The Celebration Arena is a defunct 5,000-seat indoor arena located in Priceville, Alabama, near Decatur. It contains a 150-by-300-foot (45,000 square feet (4,200 m^{2})) arena floor that can be used not only for sporting events as well as rodeos and horse shows (most notably the world championship show for the Racking Horse), but also for trade shows, flea markets, and other special events, such as concerts (concert capacity is up to 7,000).

For a time this arena was the only structure in Alabama that contained a full indoor track. It was formerly the site of the Alabama High School Athletic Association State Indoor Track Meet. Concerns over the facility's safety led to the cancellation of the AHSAA Indoor Track season for 2007-2008. Celebration Arena ended its role as the state's indoor track facility and in 2012 a new indoor track facility was opened adjacent to the Bill Harris Arena at the Alabama State Fairgrounds in Birmingham.

In 2009, Celebration Arena was purchased by the State Products Mart of Morgan County and was eventually upgraded with facilities for its current emphasis on horse-related events.

In 2022, the State Products Mart Authority board sold the arena for Aaron Guthrie for $2.5 million. In 2024, news reported that this arena would be used for solar panel manufacturing.

== See also ==
- List of convention centers in the United States
