= Flat rack container =

Shipping container with two end walls

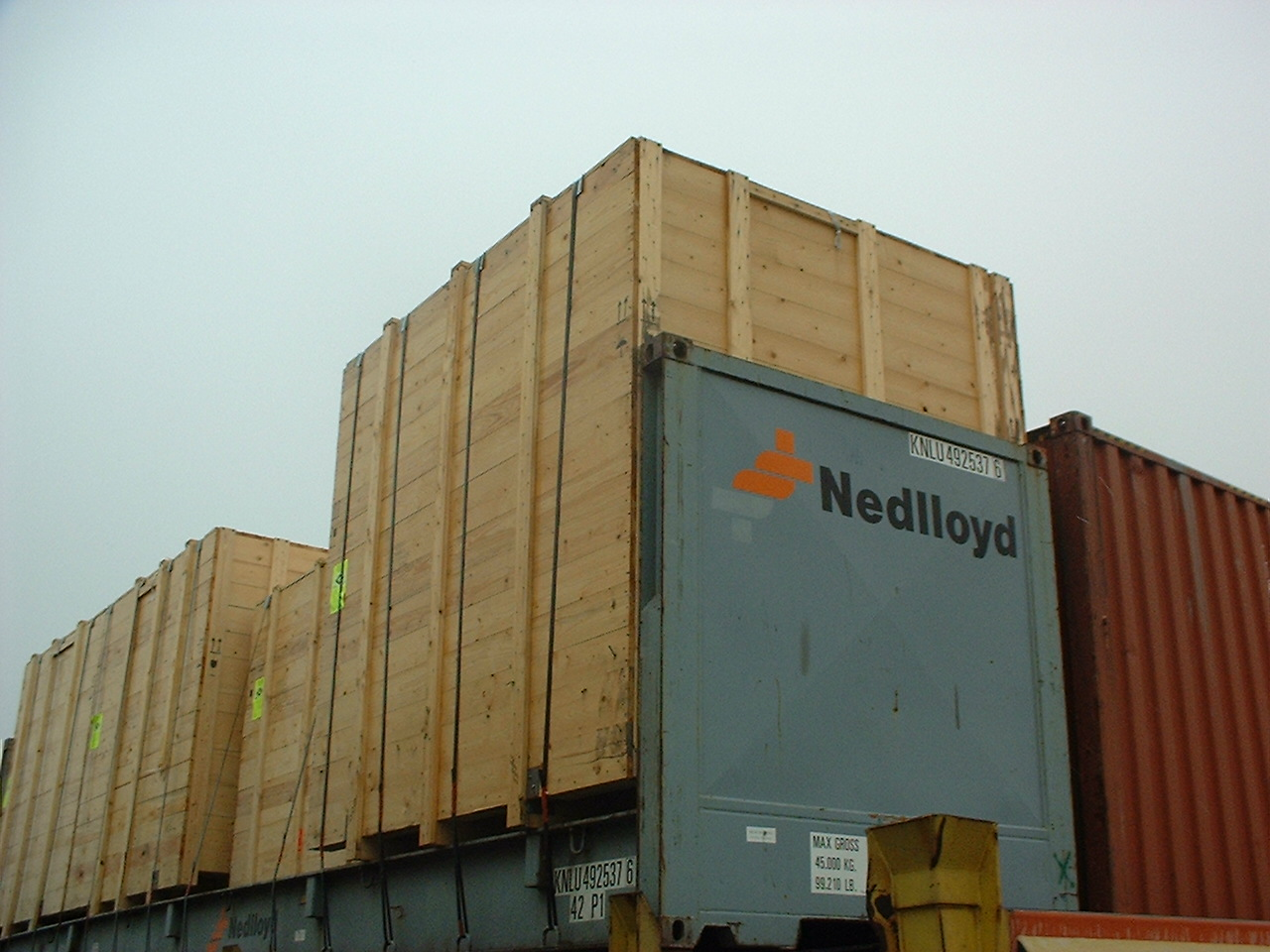
Flat rack container

A flat rack container is a shipping container with two end walls, but without side walls and roof. Although sounding similar, flat rack containers differ from flat pack containers in several ways. Some flat racks can also be equipped with pillars. Flat rack containers are also available as stake containers with and without end walls.

There are flat racks in the standard sizes 20′ or 40′, and also in the dimensions of high cube containers. They are used for transport goods that exceed the dimensions of ISO containers. The load, in most cases boxes, is secured on the flat rack. The static payload of 40′ flat rack containers is 50,000 kg in newer designs, which is why flat rack containers are often used as so-called “artificial decks” on full container ships to transport large and heavy machine parts.

Since the tare weight of a flat rack is generally lower than that of a standard container, they allow higher cargo weight. However, there is a high risk of damage to the cargo during shipping compared to fully closed containers. This risk is partially mitigated by placing flat decks in the cargo hold of a ship, or with closed containers used as protective barriers on the sides.

Some flat racks can be folded when empty, allowing five units to be stacked in the space of one regular container. The ends may also be folded to hold over-length cargo or to serve as a ramp.

Shipping companies charge surcharges for the freight costs, and a fee is also charged for the use of the flat rack itself, these costs are included in the freight rate. Flat racks, open top containers and reefer containers are also called special equipment, as the shipping rate are higher than those of standard containers. The empty flat racks are usually only available in the seaports. In order to be loaded at inland ports, a transfer rate is applicable.

== See also ==
- Roll trailer
