= List of Bellarmine Knights men's basketball head coaches =

The following is a list of Bellarmine Knights men's basketball head coaches. The Knights have had 12 coaches in their 73-season history.

Bellarmine's current head coach is Doug Davenport. He replaced his father Scott, who retired at the end of the 2024–25 season.

No.	Tenure	Coach	Years	Record	Pct.
1	1950–1952	Norb Raque	2	7–29	.194
2	1952–1955	Eddie Weber	3	31–35	.470
3	1955–1957	Paulie Miller	2	19–25	.432
4	1957–1959	Gene Kenney	2	23–27	.460
5	1959–1966	Alex Groza	7	91–77	.542
6	1966–1971	Jim Spalding	5	71–60	.542
7	1971–1994	Joe Reibel	23	346–277	.555
8	1994–1998	Bob Valvano	4	55–54	.505
9	1998–2002	Charlie Just	4	49–60	.450
10	2002–2005	Chris Pullem	3	28–54	.341
11	2005–2025	Scott Davenport	20	426–197	.684
12	2025–present	Doug Davenport		–	–
Totals		12 coaches	75 seasons	1,146–895	.561
Records updated through end of 2024–25 season Source
