= Racking Horse World Celebration =

- Sanctioning body: Racking Horse Breeders' Association of America
- Location: Celebration Arena, Priceville, Alabama
- Held: Annually
- Length: 9 days
- Inaugurated: 1972
- Breeds shown: Racking Horse
- Largest honor: World Grand Championship
- Classes: Over 170
- Number of entries: 1,000
- Attendance: 70,000
- Website: www.rackinghorse.org

The Racking Horse World Celebration is the largest show for the Racking Horse breed. It is held annually in late September at the Celebration Arena in Priceville, Alabama, a few miles outside Decatur. The Celebration encompasses over a week of nightly shows, and includes approximately 170 classes. Over 1,000 horses compete there each year, and spectator attendance is roughly 70,000. The World Celebration's counterpart is the Spring Celebration, held in April at the same location.

== History ==
Map of Alabama showing location of the Racking Horse World Celebration.
Racking Horse World Celebration (the United States)

The Celebration was started in 1972, not long after the formation of the Racking Horse Breeders' Association of America (RHBAA). Although most of the organizers were from Birmingham it was decided to hold the show in Priceville, which is in Morgan County, northern Alabama, because the horse center there was the best in the state at the time. The first Celebration lasted one day and included 23 classes. A total of 257 horses were shown. Many of the exhibitors and horses were from the Muscle Shoals area. The competition was patterned after the larger and to some extent, more widely known Tennessee Walking Horse National Celebration, with a World Grand Championship as the largest honor. The first World Grand Champion Racking Horse was Go Boy's Road Runner in 1972. The trainer with the most World Grand Championships was Kenny Ailshie, who won the honor six times; in 1987 on Oil Stock, 1991 and 1992 on Oil Stock's Delight, 1998 on The Finalizer, 2002 on Unreal, and 2006 on Score at Halftime. The first female rider to win the World Grand Championship was Barbara Agnich riding the horse Tragedy in 2005. In a twist, Agnich competed against her boyfriend Rick Parish to win. In 1986, the Racking Horse World and Spring Celebrations were named by the Southeast Tourism Society as being among the top 20 attractions in the Southeastern United States.

== Winners ==
This is a list of World Grand Championship winning horses, trainers, and owners at the Racking Horse World Celebration.

Racking Horse World Grand Champions
Year	Horse	Trainer	Owner
1972	Go Boy's Road Runner	Morris Denny	W. P. Smith
1973	The Bounty Hunter	Ralton Baker	Ralton Baker & Athel Hargett
1974	The Godfather	Jimmie Wehunt	Jimmie Wehunt
1975	Bentley's Ace	Gary Beam	Bentley Beam Stables
1976	Sunset Jubilee	Larry Taylor	Kenneth Helton
1977	Eternal Flame	Larry Thomas	Doug McCosh
1978	Mc's Rambling Man	Jeff Johnston	Johnston Stables
1979	The Great Gatsby	Keith Bradford	Buck Island Stables
1980	Ace's High Roller	Larry Taylor	W. L. Cox
1981	The Bold Master	Roger Lewis	Ed Smith
1982	Intruder's Night Hawk	Jackie Barron	Diana Floyd
1983	Broadway Joe C	Jimmy Yeager	Gordon Smith
1984	Bourbon Street Bum II	Larry Taylor	Alice Mullins
1985	Powerful Threat	Joe Spivey	PI Unlimited
1986	Oil Stock	Jackie Barron	Tri-State Distributors
1987	Oil Stock	Kenny Ailshie	Tri-State Distributors
1988	Patent's Black Poison	John Grainger	Henry & Diane Bell
1989	Sunset Pure Delight	Harley Taylor	Willis & Mackie
1990	The Generator J	Jimmy Yeager	Robert & Janice Dabbs
1991	Oil Stock's Delight	Kenny Ailshie	Clyde Creech family
1992	Oil Stock's Delight	Kenny Ailshie	Clyde Creech family
1993	Professional Image	Dale Watts	Gene Stokley
1994	Choice's First Cut	Robert Stivers	Clyde & Grace Robertson
1995	Flashy Dazzle	Jimmy Yeager	Willard & Linda Townson
1996	Master's Easy Money	John Grainger	Maxis Strickland
1997	Guaranteed Perfect	Rick Parish	CVF Partners
1998	The Finalizer	Kenny Ailshie	Clyde Creech family
1999	Papa's Choice	Mark Taylor	Robert & Vivian Watkins
2000	Pursuing Perfection	Larry Latham	Muguerza & Harris
2001	The Pushoverture	Keith Ailshie	Clyde Creech family
2002	Unreal	Kenny Ailshie	Terry Dotson family
2003	Gold Plated SD	Casey Wright	Joan & Amanda Hart
2004	Fashion's Pride	Mark Taylor	Bill & Linda Cone
2005	Tragedy	Barbara Agnich	Tommy & Sharon Vivian
2006	Score at Halftime	Kenny Ailshie	Denny Russell
2007	The Finalizer	Lamar Denny	John L. Denny
2008	Jose's Pushover	Dwight Dunn	Robert & Tom Deaton
2009	It's Me Again	Rick Parish	Arvolle Brown
2010	Jose's Pushover	Jamie Lawrence	Denny Russell
2011	Score at Halftime	Jonathan Bellamy	Howard & Theresa Bellamy
2012	Papa's Final Choice	Larris Missildine	Riley Fenn
2013	Pusher's Dollar	Jason Creech	Clyde Creech family
2014	High Sword	Jamie Lawrence	Kimberley Coult
2015	High Sword	Jamie Lawrence	Kimberley Coult
2016	Tears	Jamie Lawrence	Kimberley Coult
2017	Helter Skelter	Brandon Ailshie	Angela Fields
2018	Sy Robertson	Jamie Lawrence	Denny Russell
2019	High Sword	Jamie Lawrence	Roy Wester
2020	High Sword	Jamie Lawrence	Roy Wester
2021	I'm McGregor	Chris Zahnd	Brain Rolen
2022	I'm McGregor	Chris Zahnd	Brian Rolen
2023	I'm McGregor	Chris Zahnd	Brian Rolen
2024	He's Slim Seve	Jamie Lawrence	Roy Wester

== Classes ==
The Celebration lasts 9 days and nights and includes over 170 classes to accommodate a variety of disciplines, including saddle seat, trail, English pleasure, western riding, driving, speed classes, and even stick horse riding for young children. All horses entered must be registered with the RHBAA, and the trainer, owner and rider of each horse must also be Association members. All horses entered must have a negative Coggins test and currently be vaccinated against the equine herpes virus. Multiple World Championships and one World Grand Championship are awarded during the course of the Celebration. One specialty class, called "Racking for the Roses" is designed to showcase the abilities of horses that may not enter the World Grand Championship. Riders in the class must be professional trainers who have been training for at least 5 years and have never won the World Grand Championship. The World Grand Championship is the most significant and the final class in the Celebration, held on the last Saturday night of the show. It has a cash prize of $3,000 and a silver tea set for first place. In addition to regular competition, the show includes a horse sale, trainers' association meeting, and youth activities.

The Celebration has average attendance of around 70,000 people annually. It includes about 1,000 horses from 25 US states.

== Spring Celebration ==
The Spring Celebration, formerly known as the Spring Warm-Up is held in mid-to-late April and begins the Racking Horse show season each year. It is very similar in style and level of competition to the World Show, but only lasts four days. It is the second-largest Racking Horse show in the United States.
