= Pot rack =

Kitchenware

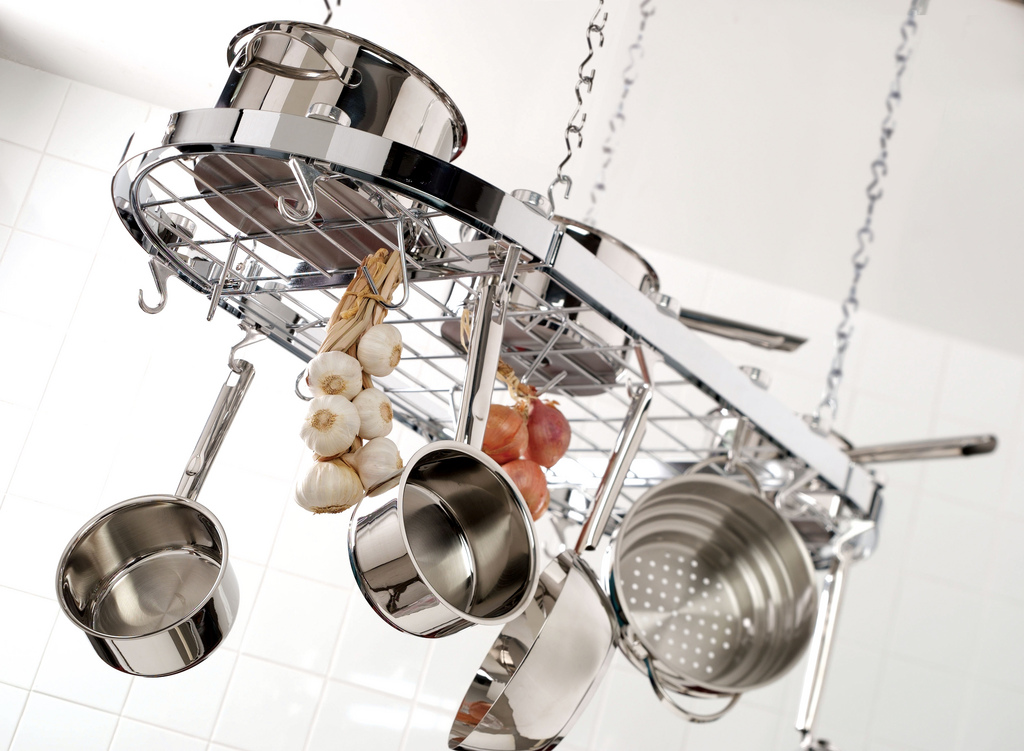
Hanging stainless steel pot rack

A pot rack is a functional piece of kitchen furniture that is used to hang or store cooking pots and pans. Steel, wood, wrought iron, and a few other metals are the most common types of materials used for pot racks. Pot racks also usually have some type of finish or stain to help them match pots and decor. In addition, pot racks can range in size from less than a foot to over fifteen feet long. These larger pot racks are capable of supporting dozens of pots and pans.

== Benefits ==
Pot racks are often purchased for convenience, saving storage space, and for decorative value. Using a pot rack delivers convenience because a person is able to find the pots and pans quickly and easily when they are needed. Pot racks also save storage space by freeing up cabinet space and allowing pot racks to be stored on in previously unused space in the kitchen. Pot racks also provide decorative value and can enhance the overall scheme and visual appearance of the kitchen.

== Types ==
There are three basic categories of pot racks: hanging, wall mounted, and free standing.

=== Hanging ===
Hanging pot racks are the most common type of pot racks. Hanging pot racks need to be installed into ceiling joists. They usually come with chains or extension hooks, or hanging links and ceiling screws. Hanging pot racks are normally sold with hooks that can be positioned on the rim or on the grid. Pots and pans can be hung directly from the grid or from the rim using these hooks. Grids can be many shapes, but the most common are rectangular, round, or oval.

=== Wall mounted ===
Wall mounted pot racks are designed to hang on the wall to save space. Wall pot racks can appear like a horizontal bar or can look like a small hanging shelf. Bar pot racks are just a strip of metal that attaches to wall studs in two places. Pots are hung on the knob that protrude from the bar. Wall pot racks are safely attached to screws that are drilled into wall studs, not plaster or drywall.

=== Free standing ===
Free standing pot racks are not attached to anything else, but instead sit directly on the ground. There are many different looks and styles for free standing pot racks. Some look like tall book shelves and have pots resting on the wood at various levels. Others stand freely, but contain hooks to hang the pot on. Most freestanding pot racks have the same design elements as other decorative furniture pieces.

== Installation ==
Hanging pot racks come in various heights. There are three measurements needed in order to install a hanging pot rack. First is the reaching height, or the height where it is comfortable for a person to reach. Most people want to hang a pot rack at a comfortable reaching height. This height is usually about one foot above the height of a person's head and this is where the pots should be located. The second measurement needed is the height of the ceiling. The third measurement is the height of the pot rack with the hooks. The height of the ceiling minus the reaching height is the required height of the pot rack and chains.

Wall pot racks are safely attached to screws that are drilled into wall studs, not plaster or drywall. Otherwise, the weight of the pots and pans may dislodge the pot rack, damage your wall, or become a safety hazard.
