= Roll trailer =

Vehicle used to transport heavy goods

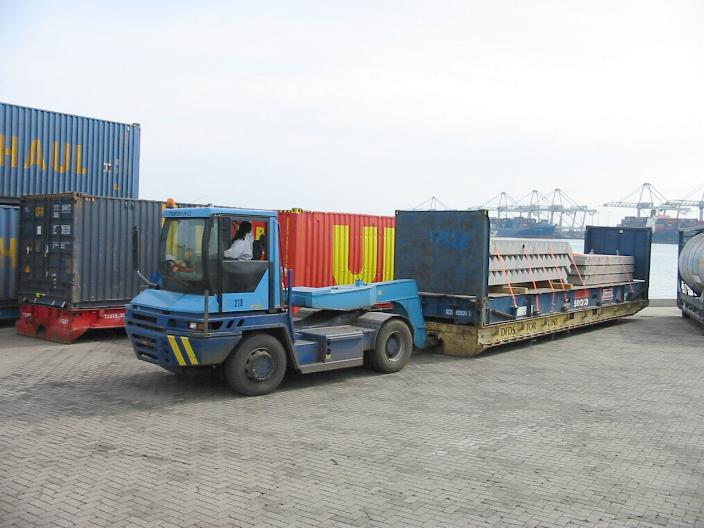
- Classification: Unpowered vehicle
- Industry: Maritime shipping
- Application: Transport
- Powered: No
- Self-propelled: No
- Wheels: Rear only
- Axles: 1
- Components: Frame, wheels, wooden surface

A roll trailer or "Mafi" is a trailer platform that requires towing by a powered vehicle. It is commonly used for the transport of heavy static goods and materials in the maritime shipping industry. Roll trailers are similar to shipping flat racks containers, however, they have a set of rear wheels. Mafi's are worldwide standard for loading static cargoes on ro-ro vessels.

== Overview ==
Roll trailers are a common equipment used in ports and on board of roll-on/roll-off ships, to facilitate the shipping of unmovable commodities and oversize load from one port to another.

Standard lengths of roll trailers are 20, 40 and 62 feet (6.1, 12.2 and 18.9 m), in line with twenty-foot equivalent unit shipping containers, but can also be found in lengths of 30 and 80 feet (9.1 and 24.4 m). The standard payloads of roll trailers vary from 40 to 120 tons, and the tare of the trailer varies from 7 to 10 tons.

The trailer has a steel structure and a hardwood surface, plus a front pocket for towing by tugmaster gooseneck, and side handles for applying lashing hooks.

== The term "MAFI" ==
The term "MAFI" as used for heavy-duty roll trailers originates from the German company MAFI Transport-Systeme GmbH, which pioneered the development of roll-on/roll-off (RoRo) cargo handling systems in the 1960s. The company, founded in 1957, introduced a specialized system consisting of a terminal tractor, a detachable gooseneck, and a low-profile cargo trailer. Because of the widespread adoption of this equipment in maritime transport and port logistics, the brand name became genericized within the shipping industry. Today, the term "MAFI trailer" or simply "MAFI" is commonly used as a generic designation for heavy-duty roll trailers, regardless of the actual manufacturer.

== Operations ==
Goods are usually placed on roll trailers by forklift or shore crane, secured with lashing or chains, and then towed on/off board via tugmaster tractor. When empty, they can be stacked like shipping containers.

Every trailer has a unique identification number stamped on sides, composed of four letters and seven digits, directly related to the manufacturer company abbreviation name, the payload capacity and its length size.

All the main shipping lines have an owned fleet of roll trailers available to be offered to shippers for moving heavy static cargo. Additionally, all main roll trailers manufacturers tend to lease extra equipment during peak times, by charging a daily hire fee to the shipping lines.

Once in the port, after a short "free time" period, roll trailers are subject to demurrage charges, to cover storage and detention fees and to ensure consignees swiftly unload their cargo, temporary positioned on the shipping line's trailers during the sea passage.
As per standard practice, and opposite to shipping containers, roll trailers are not permitted to exit the ports, with receivers requested to collect their goods inside the terminals.

Shipping lines may need to move empty roll trailers to different ports. The roll trailers can be stacked on top of each other through lifting, then lashed together, and loaded onto a vessel to be taken to another port.

== Gallery ==
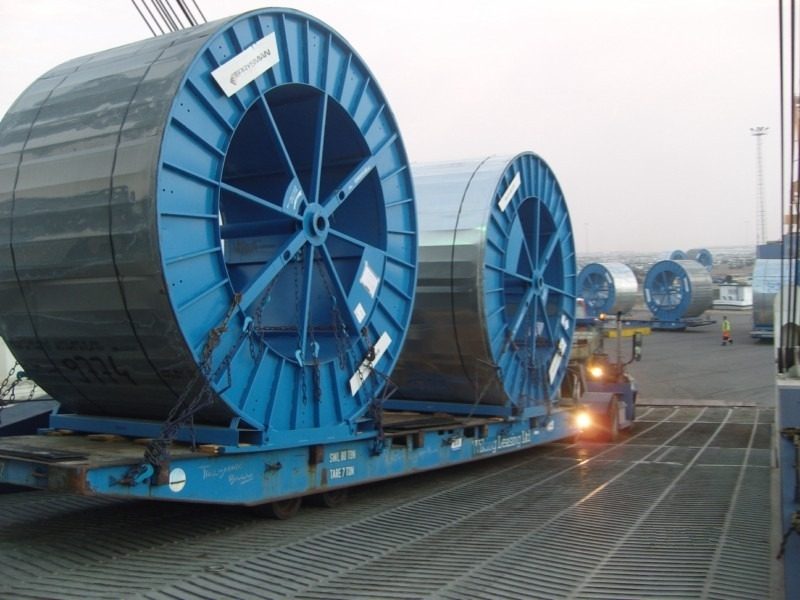
Cable reels transport

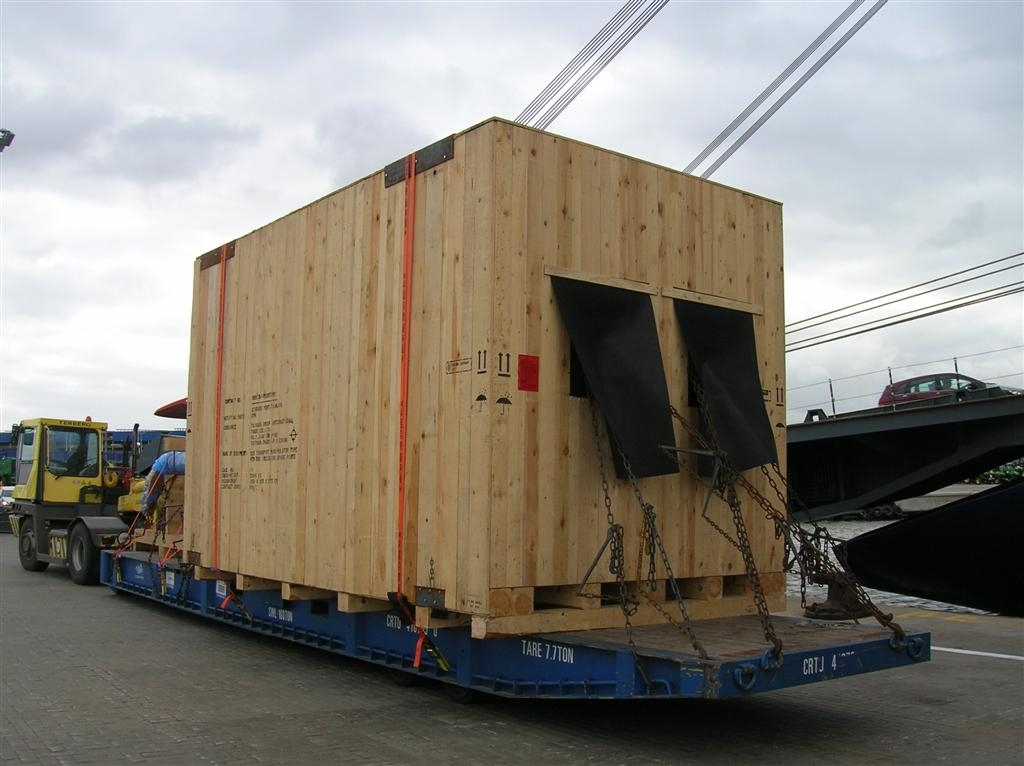
Crate carriage

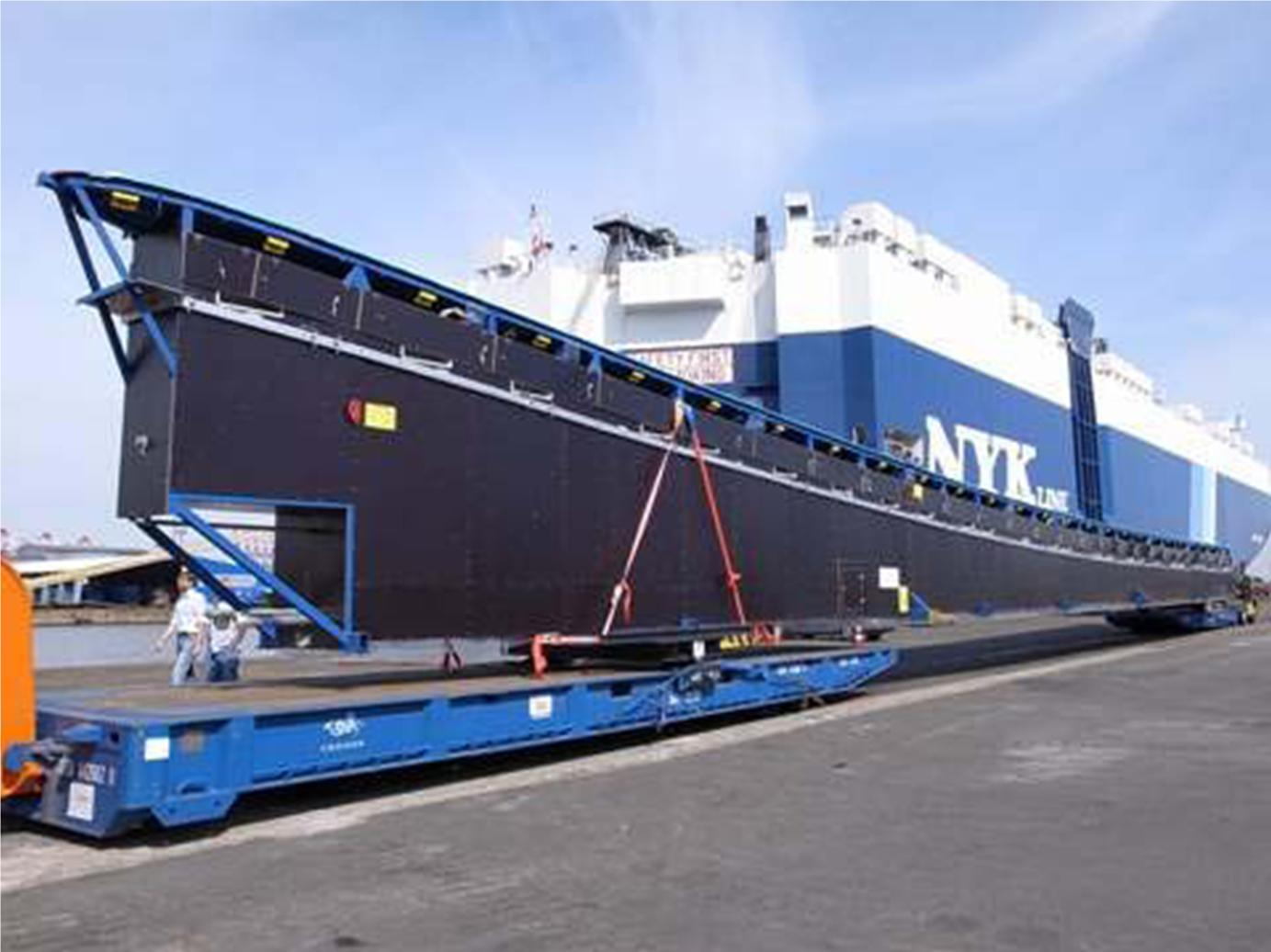
Tandem operation

== See also ==
- Terminal tractor
