= Monkey's fist =

Knot to weight the end of a rope

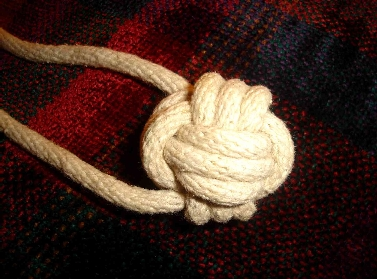
- Category: Stopper
- Typical use: tied at the end of a rope to serve as a weight or an anchor
- ABoK: #2202
- Instructions

A monkey's fist or monkey paw is a type of knot, so named because it looks somewhat like a small bunched fist or paw. It is tied at the end of a rope to serve as a weight, making it easier to throw, and also as an ornamental knot. This type of weighted rope can be used as a hand-to-hand weapon, called a slungshot by sailors. It was also used in the past as an anchor in rock climbing, by stuffing it into a crack. It is still sometimes used today in sandstone, as in the Elbe Sandstone Mountains in Germany.

== Description ==
an ornamental monkey's fist with a hard eye splice, custom-made at the chandlers Arthur Beale

The monkey's fist is a spherical covering with six surface parts presenting a regular over-one-and-under-one weave. This weave is commonly doubled or tripled to present an appearance that superficially resembles a Turk's-head. Like the Turk's-head, the knot is tied with a single strand, but here the resemblance ceases. The Turk's-head diagram consists of a single line; the common monkey's fist diagram has three separate lines, which are best represented by three interlocking circles, in the best Ballantine tradition. To tie a knot on this diagram with a single strand, it is necessary to complete each circle in turn—that is, to double or triple it, as the case may be—and when this has been done to deflect the strand into another circle which is completed in turn before commencing the third and last circle.

— The Ashley Book of Knots

The monkey's fist knot is most often used as the weight in a heaving line. The line would have the monkey's fist on one end, an eye splice or bowline on the other, with about 30 feet (~10 metres) of line between. A lightweight feeder line would be tied to the bowline, then the weighted heaving line could be hurled between ship and dock. The other end of the lightweight line would be attached to a heavier-weight line, allowing it to be drawn to the target easily.

The knot is often tied around a small weight, such as a stone, marble, tight fold of paper, grapeshot, or a piece of wood. However, this may be considered unsafe and therefore poor seamanship. The UK Maritime and Coastguard Agency's (MCA) publication "Code of Safe Working Practices for Merchant Seamen", Section 25.3.2, states that "heaving lines should be constructed with a 'monkey’s fist' at one end. To prevent personal injury, the 'fist' should be made only with rope and should not contain added weighting materials".

== Tying ==
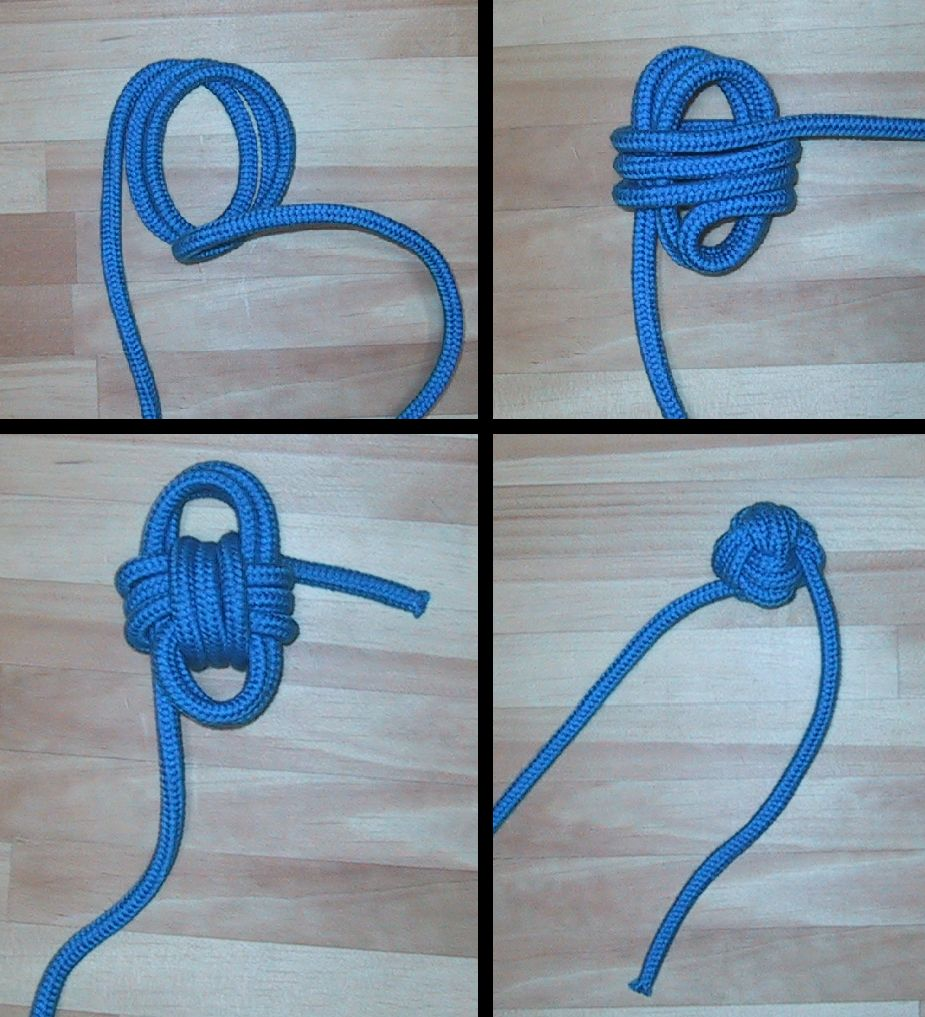
tying the Monkeys fist

The three coils of cordage in a monkey's fist form in effect a set of Borromean rings in three dimensions. This is most obvious when tied flat. The rings should then be started near center, coiled from outside inwards, in all three set of rings, and the third set finished by letting the end exit through the triangular hole at the center. Subsequent tightening should let the outside edges curl to form an opposing triangular hole around the main part. This is suitable if a ring formed object is to be contained in the central cavity around the main part. If the object has no hole, it might be desirable to have the ends exit the knot at or near the central triangular hole.

Flat tying monkey's fist knot

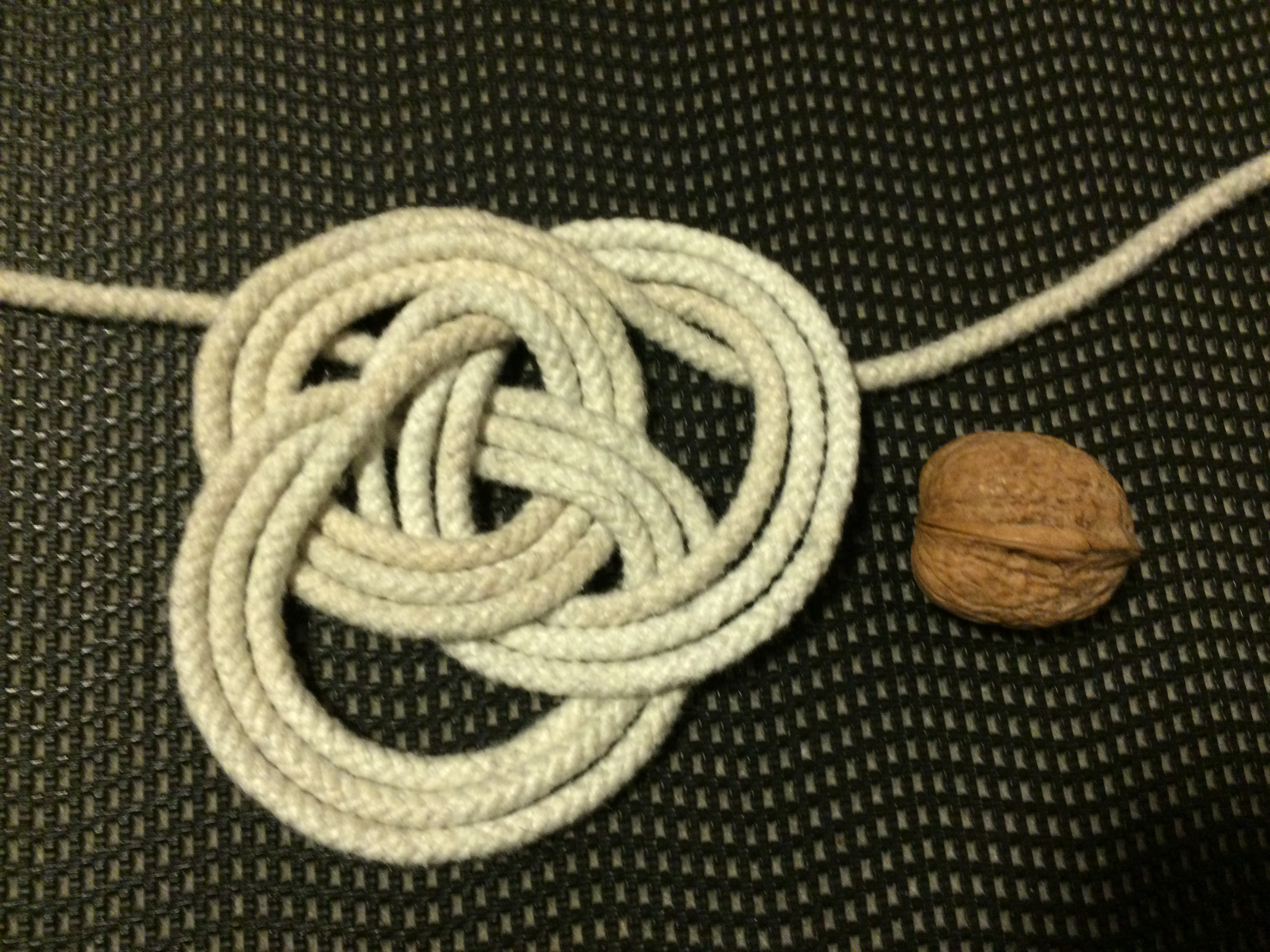
Step 1: tied flat

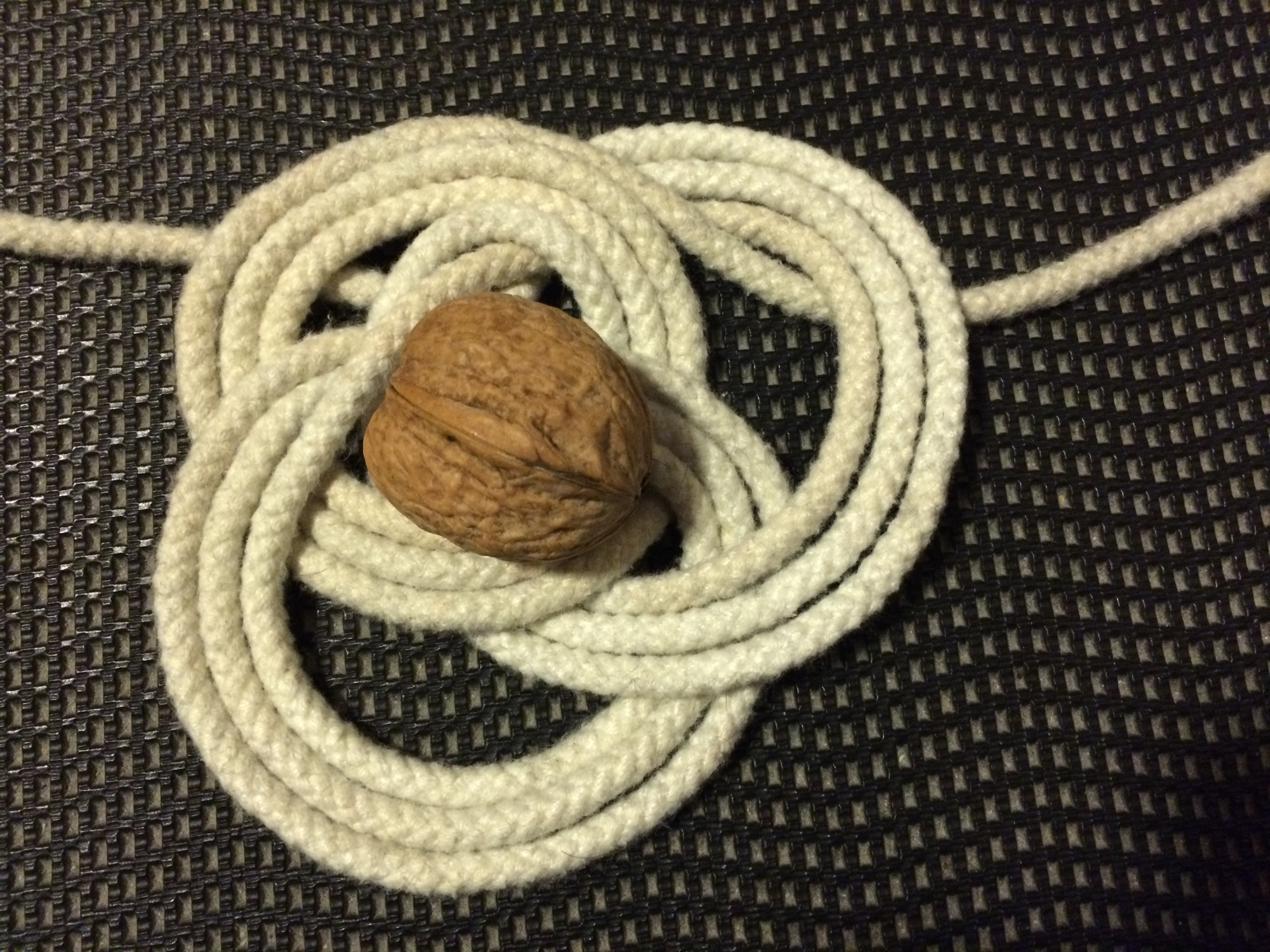
Step 2: flat, with content in the middle

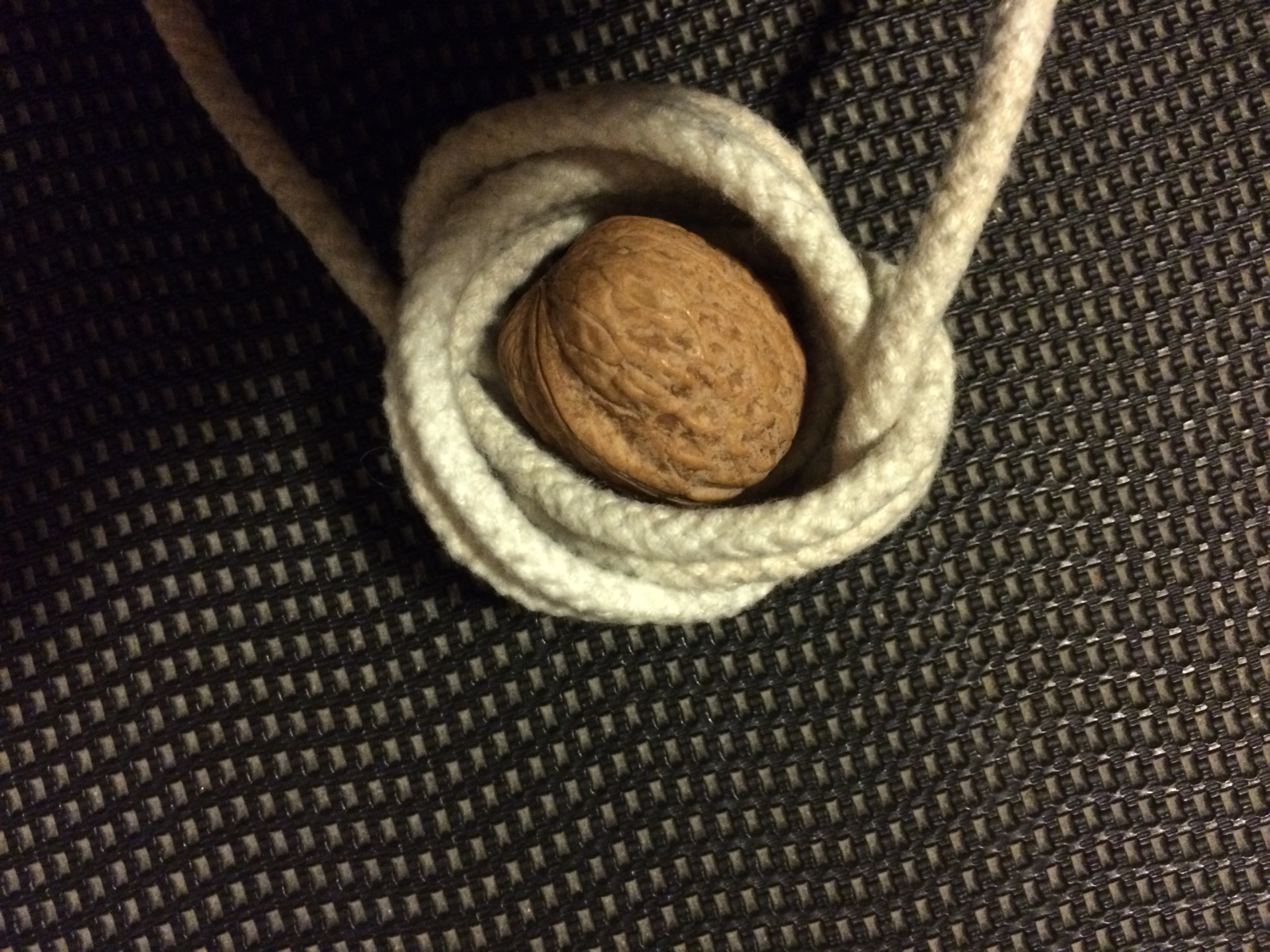
Step 3: loosely wrapping content

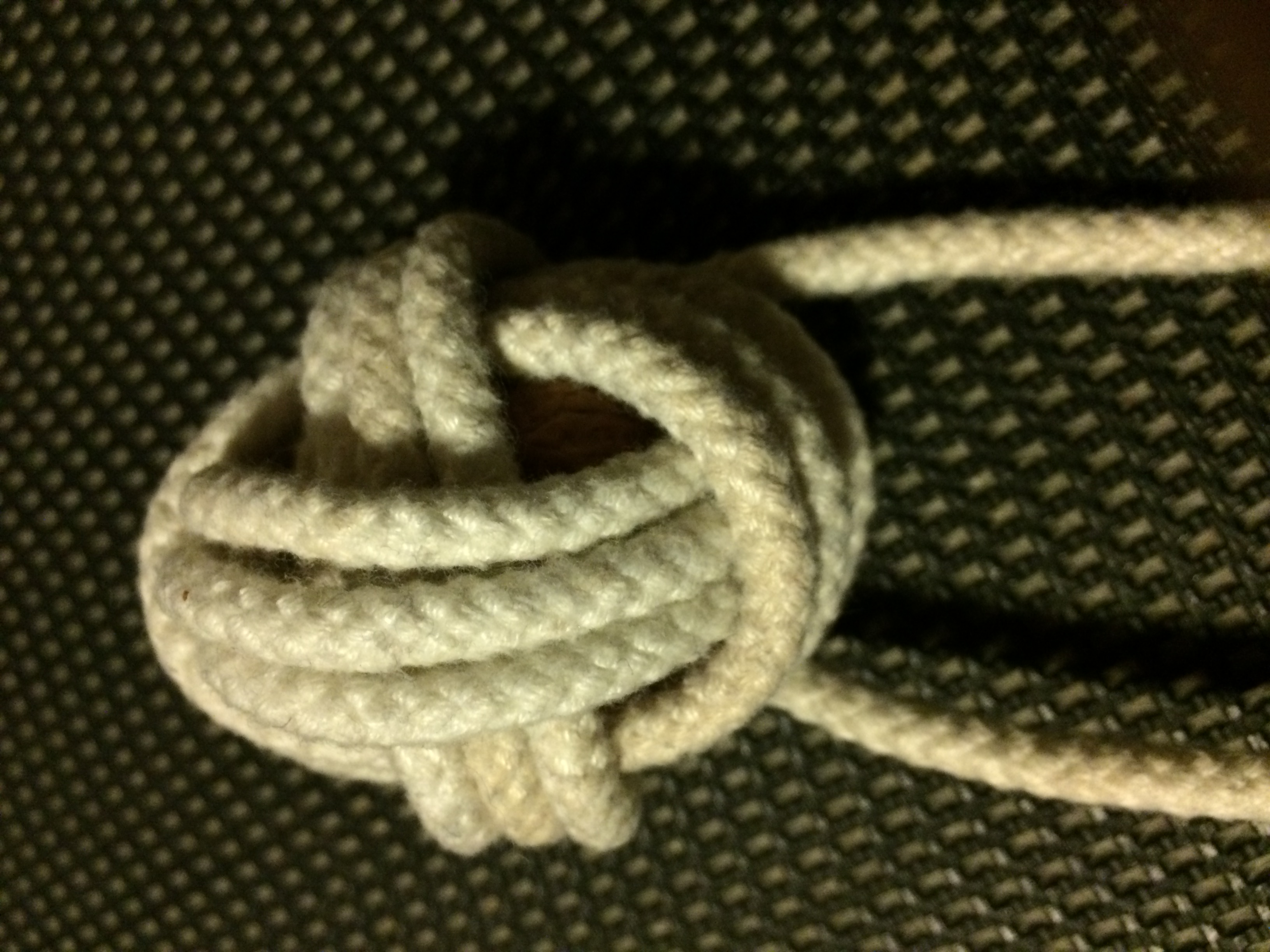
Step 4: tightened around content

== Other applications ==
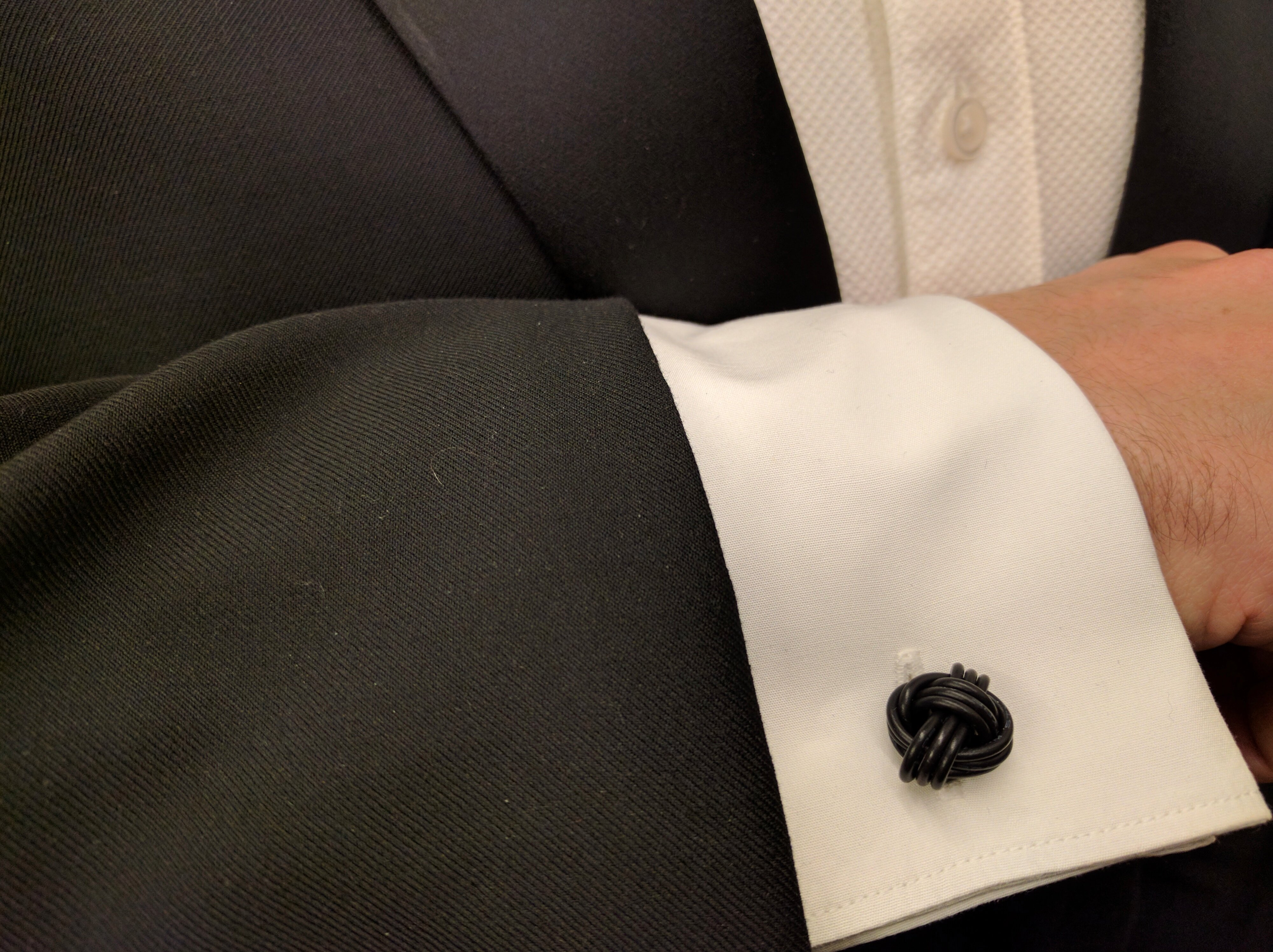
A cufflink made from a wire tied into a Monkey's fist knot

A monkey's fist can be used on two ends of a tow lines of one side a fish net which is then thrown from one trawler to another, allowing the net to be cast and set between two boats so the trawl can be used between the two, in pair trawling where the tow or catch is negotiated between both parties. This makes it easier to catch fish given the greater surface area between both boats to turn around and catch missed fish from the sea much more quickly. Once all fish have been hauled up from the sea, tow lines of the fish net is returned by way of thrown both monkey's fists back to the host trawler. Alternatively, a monkey fist can be used as a weight of a heaving line thrown to over to an opposing ship to bring two ships together.

== See also ==
- Heaving line knot
- List of knots
