= Truck bed rack =

A bed rack is usually a set of steel or aluminum bars secured to the body of a truck bed. Due to the tall tubes, a.k.a. legs, the bed rack is usually higher than the bed itself so that it does not limit inner bed cargo space. Such construction allows it to increase the load and storage capacity of the truck. Usually, a bed rack is used to transport different cargo types, such as baggage, kayaks, bikes, tools, surfboards, snowboards, tourist gear, and so on. The accessory's primary use lies in the fact that it does not limit interior storage. At the same time, it allows the vehicle to transport an object that potentially is bigger than its trunk.

== History ==
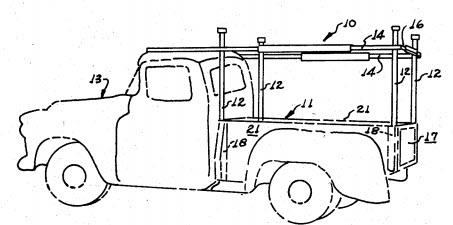
Original Truck Bed Rack Prototype, Invented in 1960 by PIERCE METAL PRODUCTS, Inc.

Even though bed racks have gained great popularity over the last decade, the first bed rack was introduced in the 1960s by Pierce Metal Products Inc. Its primary purpose was defined as to build the sides of the carrying box of the truck adjustable to the side of the cargo and to the type of the vehicle. Modern bed racks resemble the original construction of the 1960s build and are widely used by such known brands as Jeep, Ford, Toyota, and others.

== Types ==
Bed racks are divided into three main categories. Bed racks are:

1. Crossbar bed rack – two crossbars non-invasively attached to the bed body
2. Cargo bed racks – a set of interchangeable and customizable rails non-invasively attached to the body of the truck bed
3. Expedition bed racks – heavy-duty construction with multiple tie-down points, increased load capacity, and impressive storage

Even though all bed racks are designed for the primary function to increase storage capacity and secure the transported cargo, there are multiple factors to consider when choosing a suitable option. Bed racks vary depending on their functions, weight, load capacity, price range, and general destination. Some bed racks can also be equipped with additional accessories, such as: side rails, kayak mounts, bike mounts, and tent mounts.
