= RAC =

RAC or Rac may refer to:

== Organizations ==
- Radio Amateurs of Canada
- RATCH-Australia Corporation, electricity generator
- Refugee Action Collective (Victoria), Melbourne, Australia
- Religious Action Center of Reform Judaism, US
- Rent-A-Center, an American company
- Riverside Arts Council, California, US
- Riyadh Airports Company, Saudi Arabian company
- Robertson Aircraft Corporation, a predecessor of American Airlines
- Royal African Company, an English company active from 1660 to 1752 trading slaves and commodities
- Royal Automobile Club (disambiguation), several motoring organisations
  - RAC Limited, a British motorists' services company
  - RAC Foundation, a British motoring advocacy group
- Ryukyu Air Commuter, an affiliate of Japan Airlines

== Military ==
- Royal Armoured Corps of the British Army
- Romanian Air Corps, the air arm of the Romanian Army in WWI

== Sport ==
- RAC Arena (Perth)
- Retriever Activities Center, multi-purpose arena, Catonsville, Maryland, US
- Rutgers Athletic Center, multi-purpose arena, Piscataway, New Jersey, US
- Racing Athletic Club Casablanca, Morocco

== Music ==
- RAC 1, a radio station in Catalonia, Spain
- Recording Artists' Coalition, US
- RAC (musician), stage name of André Allen Anjos
- Rock Against Communism, racist concerts

== Computing ==
- Oracle RAC, Real Application Clusters
- Reliability Analysis Component, one of the management features new to Windows Vista

== People ==
- Rác (surname)
- Rác (ethnonym) or Rascians, an early modern name for Serbs
- Rac Slider (born 1933), retired baseball player

== Other uses ==
- John H. Batten Airport, Racine, Wisconsin, USA, IATA airport identifier
- Rac (GTPase), a subfamily of G proteins
- Recovery Audit Contractor, US program to find improper medical payments
- Reservation against Cancellation, a booking option of Indian Railways
- Ratchet And Clank, Video game series developed by Insomniac Games.
- Racecourse station (MTR), Hong Kong, MTR station code
- Ryukyu Air Commuter ICAO Airlines Code
- rac-, a prefix used in chemistry to indicate a racemic mixture
