= RAK =

RAK or rak may refer to:

== Places ==
- Rak (river), in Slovenia
- Rak, Kuyavian-Pomeranian Voivodeship, a village in north-central Poland
- Rak Rural District, in Kohgiluyeh and Boyer-Ahmad Province, Iran
  - Rak, Iran, a village in Rak Rural District
- Marrakesh Menara Airport (airport code: RAK), in Morocco
- Emirate of Ras Al Khaimah, the northernmost of the United Arab Emirates
  - Ras Al Khaimah, the emirate's capital

== Other ==
- Rak (surname)
- RAK Records
- RAK Studios, a recording studio near Regent's Park, London, England
- FB PM-63 "RAK", a Polish 9 mm submachine gun
- M120 Rak, a Polish 120 mm mortar system
- Rak, a creature in the Wizard of Oz books, likely inspired by the legendary roc
- RAK, a runestone style, 980-1015 CE
- Rak, a villain in the 2010 video game James Bond 007: Blood Stone
- RAK, a CD by The Kooks in the special release of the album Konk
- Regeln für die alphabetische Katalogisierung, a bibliographic cataloging standard
