= RACC =

RACC may refer to:

== Organizations ==
- Reading Area Community College, Reading, Pennsylvania, United States
- Regional Arts & Culture Council, Portland, Oregon, United States
- Richmond Adult Community College, Richmond, Surrey, UK

== Science and technology ==
- racc, a LALR parser written in Ruby
- Reference Amounts Customarily Consumed, a notation of serving size on nutritional labels
