= CURV-21 =

Remotely operated underwater vehicle of the US Navy

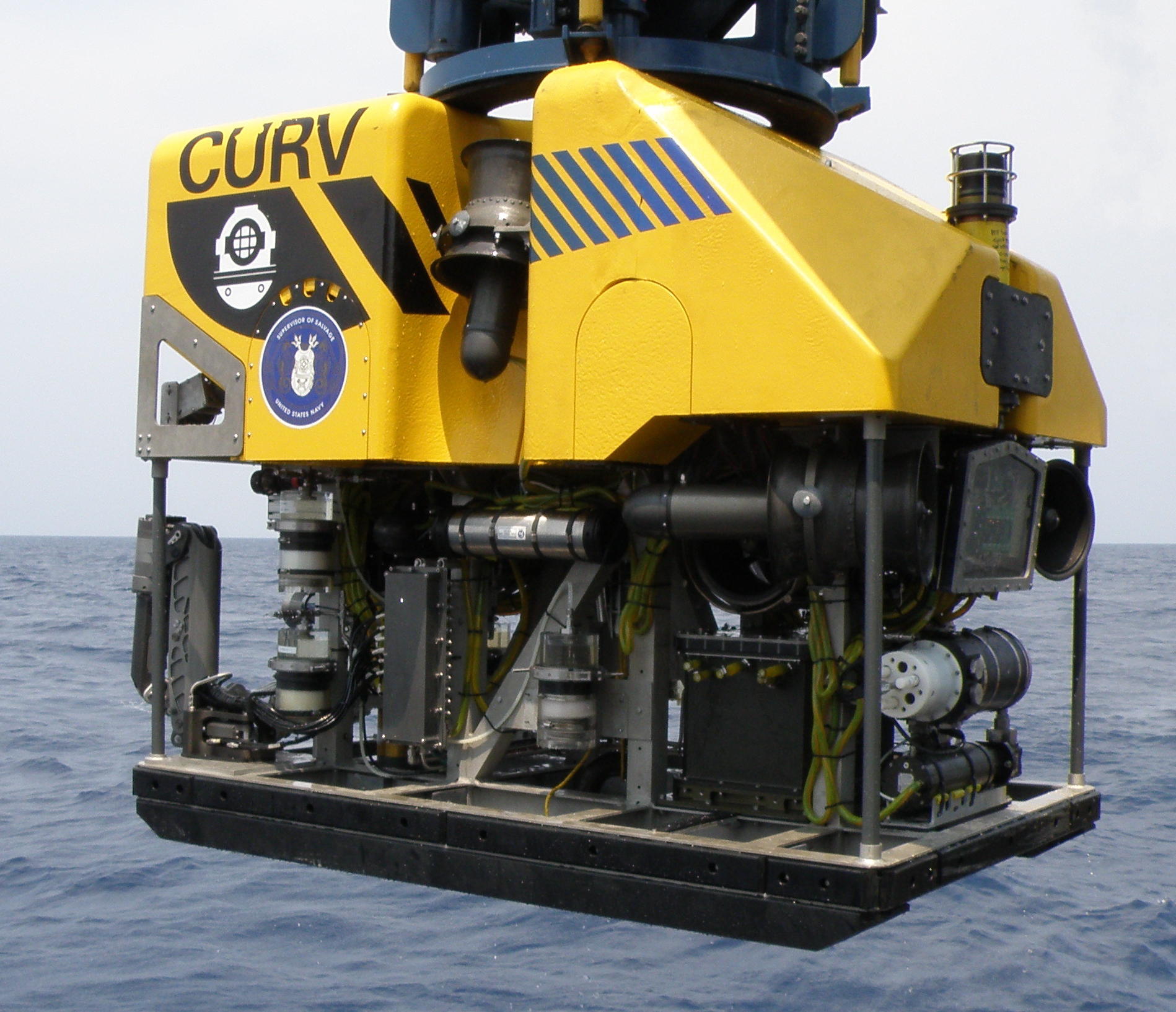

History

United States
- Name: CURV-21
- Status: in active service

General characteristics
- Displacement: 6,400 lb (2,900 kg)
- Length: 8 ft (2.4 m)
- Beam: 5 ft (1.5 m)
- Propulsion: 45 hp (34 kW)
- Speed: 2.5 kn (4.6 km/h; 2.9 mph)
- Test depth: 20,000 ft (6,100 m)
- Notes: Lifting capacity: 4,000 lb (1,800 kg)

CURV-21 is a remotely operated underwater vehicles (ROV) of the United States Navy designed to meet its deep ocean salvage requirements down to a maximum depth of 20,000 feet (6,100 m) of seawater.

It is the latest generation of the Cable-controlled Undersea Recovery Vehicle (CURV) family and was built to serve as a direct replacement for CURV-III while having a smaller overall system footprint.

It can switch at sea between side-scan sonar and ROV operations and is equipped with two manipulators in support of its salvage activities.

The ROV also has a modular design and can be customized with mission-specific equipment or special tool kits to form an integrated search and recovery system.

The system is self-contained and flyaway transportable for a worldwide response on vessels of opportunity. It can be also deployed on Powhatan-class tugboats of the Military Sealift Command.

== Features ==
The ROV can be controlled in all six degrees of motion with auto-control functions for depth, altitude, and heading. An integrated DVL allows 1- and 2-meter incremental movements as well as cruise control for extended axial movements. The vehicle is equipped with continuous transmission frequency modulation (CTFM) sonar for target location and pinger detection. The ROV uses two 7-function rate-controlled manipulators. It has a high-resolution digital still camera, black and white, and color television cameras. The system includes a 36,000 ft (11,000 metres) long, load-bearing, pressure-compensated, .680 fiber-optic, electro-optical umbilical swivel cable.

The fiber-optic multiplex system can combine up to eight channels of video, sonar, USBL, RS-232/422/485 data communications, and navigation data on a single fiber. Two spare fibers are available subsea for additional sensors. A digital communications network with a frequency of 400 MHz controls the vehicle and has significant capacity for future expansion. The system is designed to interface easily with additional sensors or tool packages using standard data formats.

For special operations, the ROV can accommodate customized tool packages. These packages can include, but are not limited to specialized salvage tools, instrument packages, or other mission-oriented equipment.

== Operational use ==
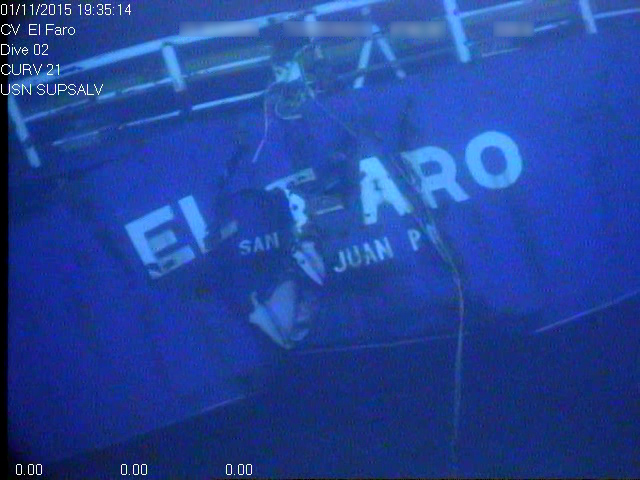
Stern of the sunken SS El Faro as inspected by CURV-21's camera

- In February 2010, the French Bureau of Enquiry and Analysis for Civil Aviation Safety (BEA) chartered a ship with the CURV-21 ROV in support of its search for the Air France Flight 447 that crashed in mid-Atlantic in 2009.
- On 22 July 2012, a U.S. Air Force F-16C traveling from Japan to Alaska crashed in the northern Pacific Ocean on July 22, 2012. Searchers from the U.S. Navy and Phoenix International, spent 10 days recovering the remnants of the fighter for the subsequent accident investigation.
- SS El Faro, a United States-flagged, combination roll-on/roll-off and lift-on/lift-off cargo ship crewed by U.S. merchant mariners, was lost at sea with her entire crew of 33 on 1 October 2015, after steaming into the eyewall of Hurricane Joaquin. Her wreck was found 30 days later at an approximate depth of 15,000 ft (4,600 metres) by the search crew of the USNS Apache using a side-scan sonar, after which CURV-21 was lowered to confirm the finding, getting a positive identification and videographing the entire hull and superstructure.
- After the disappearance of ARA San Juan in November 2017, the U.S. Navy directed CURV-21 to join the search efforts for the missing submarine, delivering "remarkably clear" pictures. Later in August the same year, specially mission-equipped CURV-21 cut free the voyage data recorder (VDR) and retrieved it back to the surface for NTSB analysis as part of their ongoing investigation.
- CURV-21 was deployed in March 2021 to the North Pacific to recover a Navy MH-60S which was lost in January 2020 from the USS Blue Ridge (LCC-19). CURV-21 successfully rigged and recovered the helicopter from 19,075 ft (5,814 metres). a new record under the U.S. Navy's Supervisor of Salvage and Diving (SUPSALV).
- In early 2022, the U.S. Navy deployed this system to salvage a F-35 Joint Strike Fighter crashed in the South China Sea from a depth of about 12,400 feet (3,800 m), done by attaching a hoist to the wreckage to pull it back to the surface.
- On 3 August 2022, the U.S. Navy successfully recovered the F/A-18E Super Hornet aircraft embarked aboard USS Harry S. Truman (CVN 75) that blew overboard into the Mediterranean Sea in inclement weather on 8 July 2022. The recovery was carried out by using CURV-21 to attach specialized rigging and lift lines to the lost aircraft to pull it back to the surface.
- During the 2023 Titan submersible incident, CURV-21 was involved in the search efforts as it was widely viewed as one of the only ROVs able to reach the depths of 4,000 m (13,000 feet) at which the missing submersible may be located.

== See also ==
- CURV — the previous generation of this vehicle family,
- Submarine rescue,
- Remotely operated underwater vehicle,
- Flyaway Deep Ocean Salvage System (FADOSS),
- U.S. Navy's systems intended for the rescue of crew members from naval submarines:
  - Submarine Rescue Diving Recompression System (SRDRS),
  - Deep-submergence rescue vehicle (DSRV).
