= Frank Bustard =

British shipping pioneer

- Born: 28 January 1888; Liverpool, Lancashire, England
- Died: 22 January 1974 aged 87; Haslemere, Surrey, England
- Military career
- Allegiance: United Kingdom
- Branch: Kings's Own (Royal Lancaster) Regiment
- Service years: 1916–1919; 1939–1945
- Rank: Colonel
- Service number: 42579
- Awards: Officer of the Order of the British Empire
- Other work: Shipping owner

Colonel Frank Bustard OBE (1886 – 22 January 1974) was a British shipping pioneer who established the commercial use of ro-ro ships using converted tank landing craft.

Bustard was born in Liverpool, Lancashire in 1886 the youngest of four sons of John and Alice Bustard. He became an apprentice with the White Star Line and was soon passenger traffic manager. In 1934 when the White Star Line merged with Cunard he left the company and started his own company. He had intended to run a service offering £10 fares from Liverpool to New York but the idea was abandoned at the start of the Second World War when Bustard re-joined the Army. Bustard had served with the Kings's Own (Royal Lancaster Regiment) in the First World War mainly as an embarkation officer and was mentioned in dispatches four times and was appointed an Officer of the Order of the British Empire. Between 1939 and 1945 Bustard worked as part of Movement Control including the D-Day landing, he was mentioned in dispatches twice. He was stationed at Bank Hall, Bretherton, Lancashire which was used during the Second World War for the north west coast shipping movement control.

At the end of the war he started the Transport Ferry Service with his two sons and in the next few years they acquired seven former military tank-landing craft to operate one of the first roll-on/roll-off drive on ferry services from the United Kingdom to continental Europe. When the ships needed to be replaced he sold the company to the British Transport Commission in 1954 and retired in 1956.

== Family life ==
Bustard married twice, first to Nora Hamilton in 1912, following her death in 1950 he married Margaret Wilkinson Sands in 1952. He had four sons and a daughter from his first marriage and a son from the second. Bustard died aged 87 on 22 January 1974 at his home at Haslemere.
