= Roll-on/roll-off =

Vessels designed to carry wheeled cargo

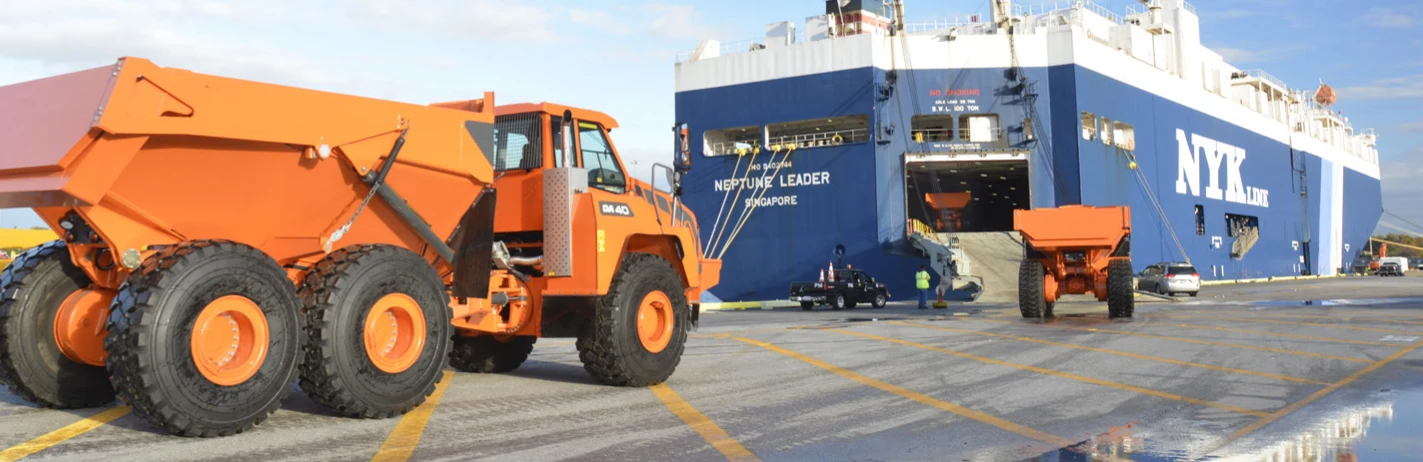
Roll-off car-carrying ship being boarded by articulated haulers at the Port of Baltimore

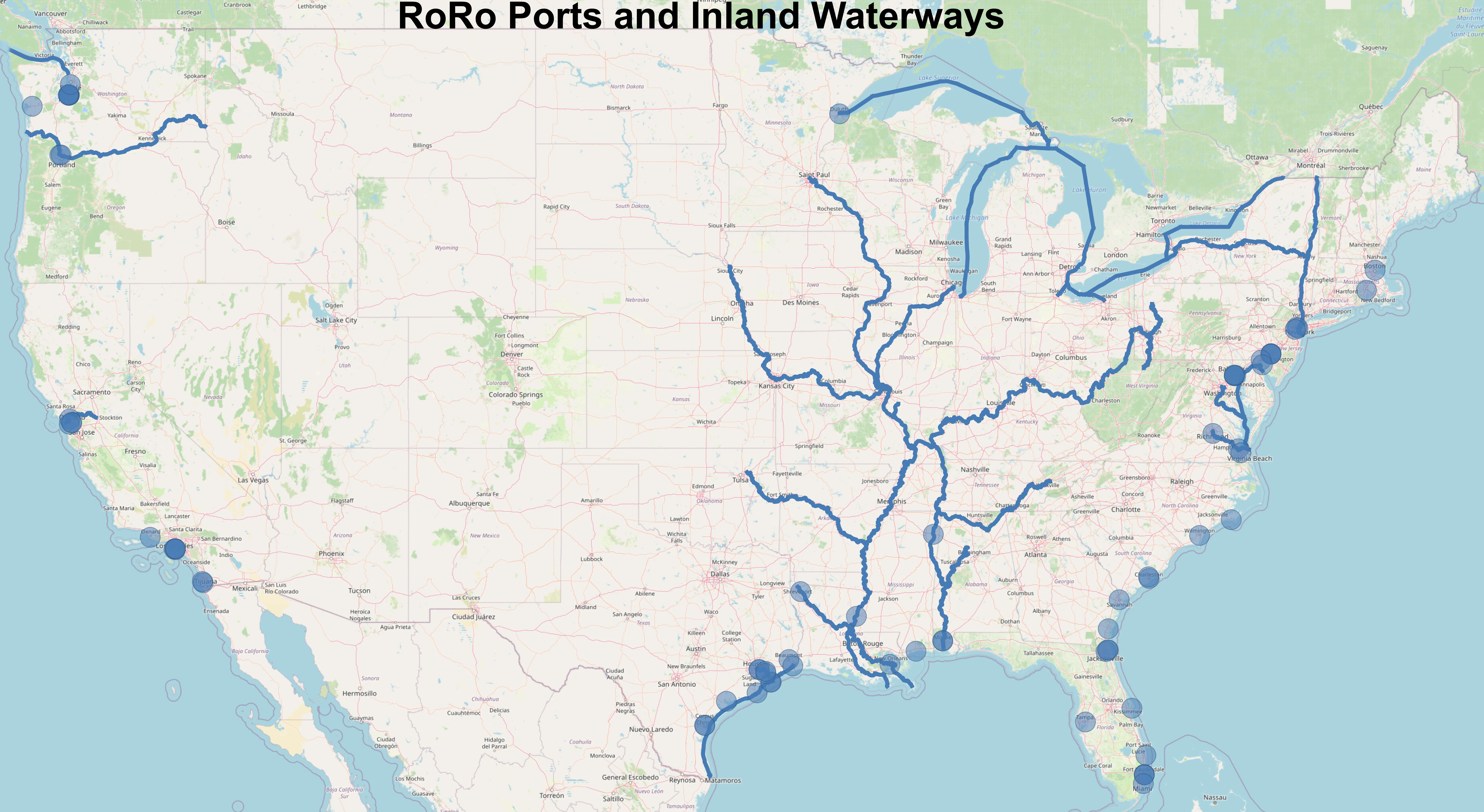
Roll-on/roll off ports and inland waterways of the United States

Roll-on/roll-off (RORO or ro-ro) ships are cargo ships designed specifically to transport wheeled cargo, such as cars, motorcycles, trucks, semi-trailer trucks, buses, trailers and railroad cars, which are moved directly onto and off the ship by their own wheels or on a platform vehicle such as a self-propelled modular transporter. This is in contrast to lift-on/lift-off (LoLo) vessels, which rely on cranes to load and unload cargo.

RORO vessels typically have a multistorey carpark-like cargo hold layout and use either built-in or dock-based linkspans (ramps) or ferry slips that allow the cargo to be efficiently loaded on and off the vessel when in port. The cargo doors and/or ramps may be located in the stern, bow or portsides, or any combination thereof. While smaller ferries that operate short distances across rivers and other waterbodies often also have built-in ramps, the term RORO is generally reserved for large seagoing vessels owned/chartered by the automotive industry for export shipping.

== Description ==
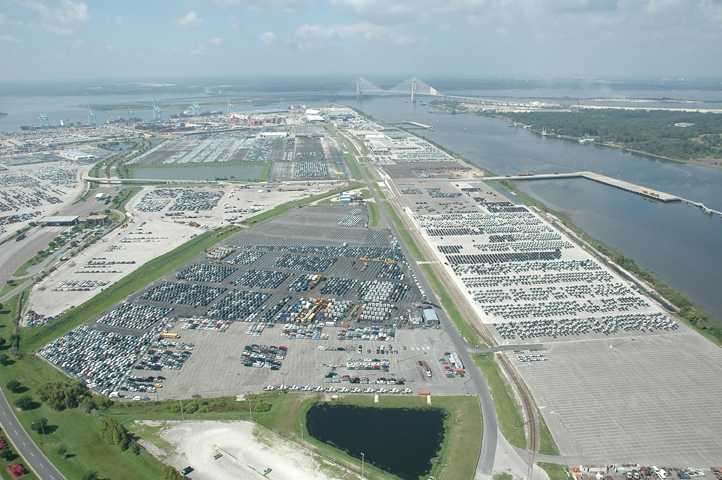
Blount Island RoRo port in Jacksonville, Florida

Types of RORO vessels include ferries, cruiseferries, cargo ships, barges, and RORO service for air/railway deliveries. New automobiles that are transported by ship are often moved on a large type of RORO called a pure car carrier (PCC) or pure car/truck carrier (PCTC).

Elsewhere in the shipping industry, cargo is normally measured by tonnage or by the tonne, but RORO cargo is typically measured in lanes in metres (LIMs). This is calculated by multiplying the cargo length in metres by the number of decks and by its width in lanes (lane width differs from vessel to vessel, and there are several industry standards). On PCCs, cargo capacity is often measured in RT or RT43 units, based on a 1966 Toyota Corona, the first mass-produced car to be shipped in specialised car-carriers and used as the basis of RORO vessel size. One RT is approximately 4 m of lane space required to store a 1.5 m wide Toyota Corona. Cargo capacity may also be measured in car-equivalent units (CEU).

The largest RORO passenger ferry is MS Color Magic, a 75,100 GT cruise ferry that entered service in September 2007 for Color Line. Built in Finland by Aker Finnyards, it is 223.70 m (733 ft 11 in) long and 35 m (114 ft 10 in) wide, and can carry 550 cars, or 1,270 lane meters of cargo.

The RORO passenger ferry with the greatest car-carrying capacity is Ulysses, owned by Irish Ferries. Ulysses entered service on 25 March 2001 and operates between Dublin and Holyhead. The 50,938 GT ship is 209.02 m (685 ft 9 in) long and 31.84 m (104 ft 6 in) wide, and can carry 1,342 cars/4,101 lane meters of cargo.

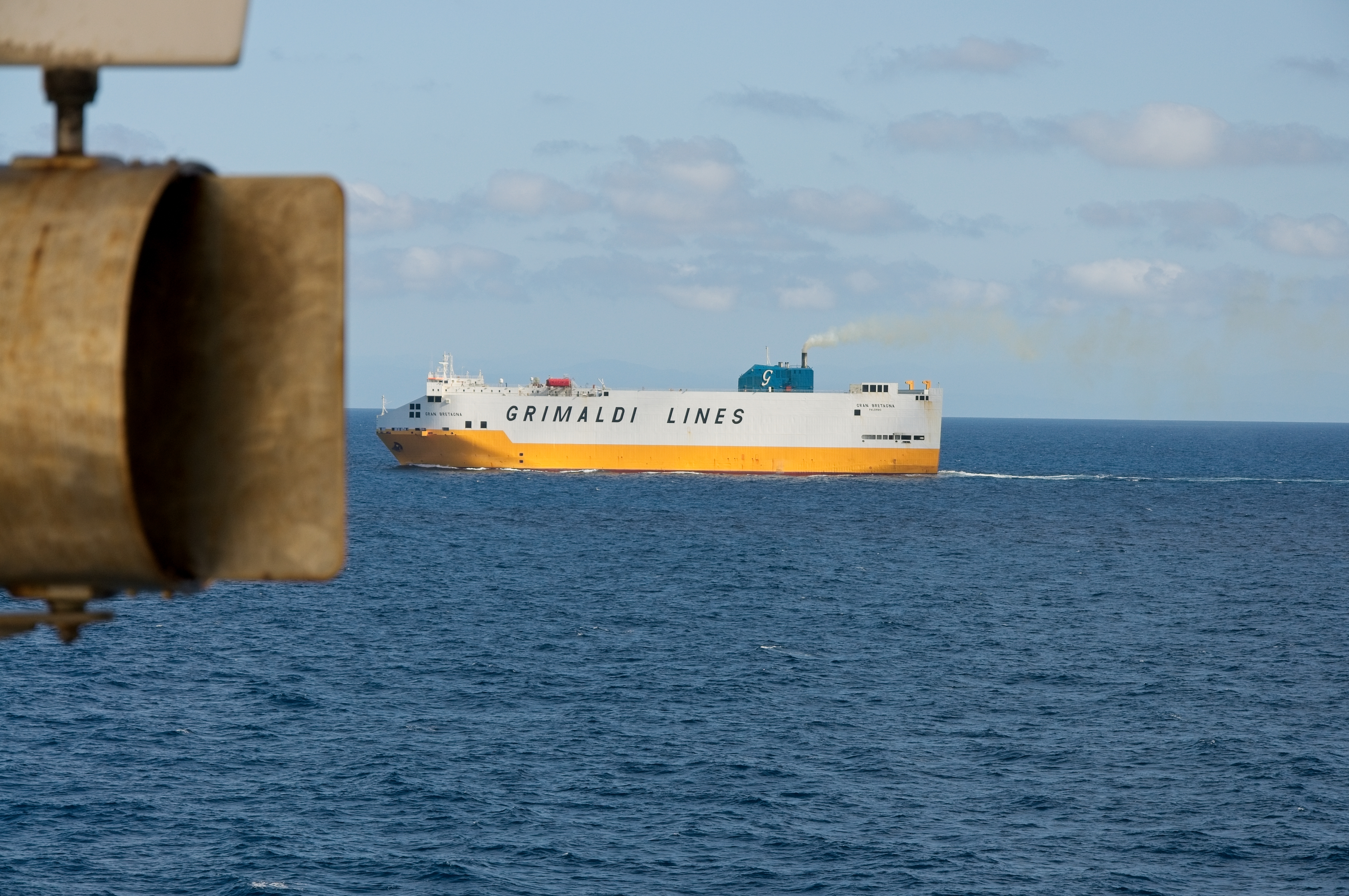
The Gran Bretagna of Grimaldi Lines in the Mediterranean Sea on 13/04/2024

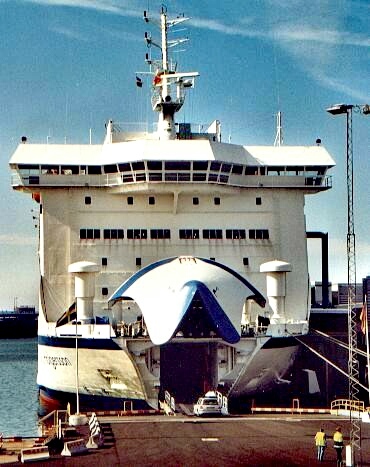
M/S Tom Sawyer in Trelleborg

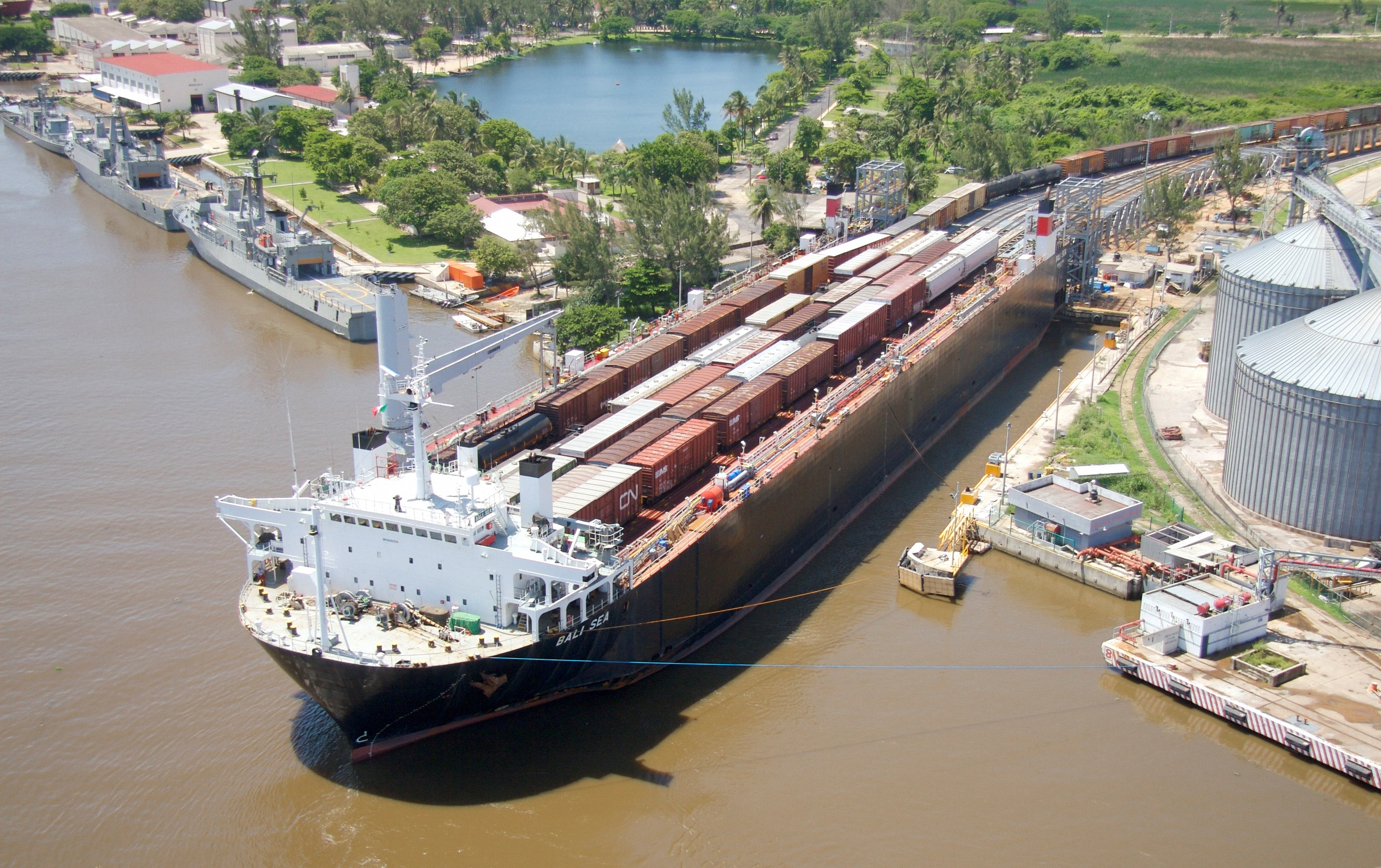
MV Bali Sea, a roll-on/roll-off train ferry operated between Coatzacoalcos and Mobile

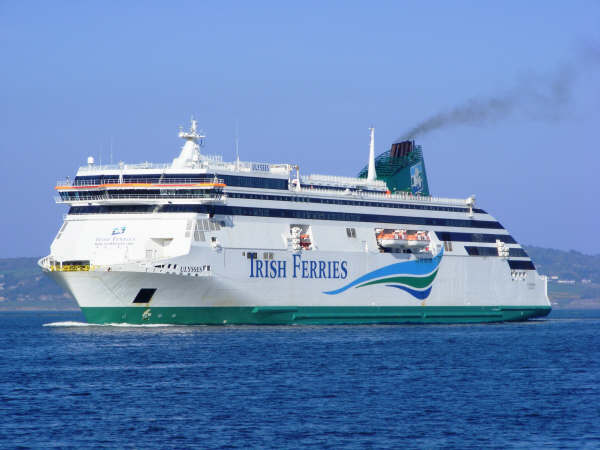
Ferry, MV Ulysses (2000), approaching Dublin Port, Ireland

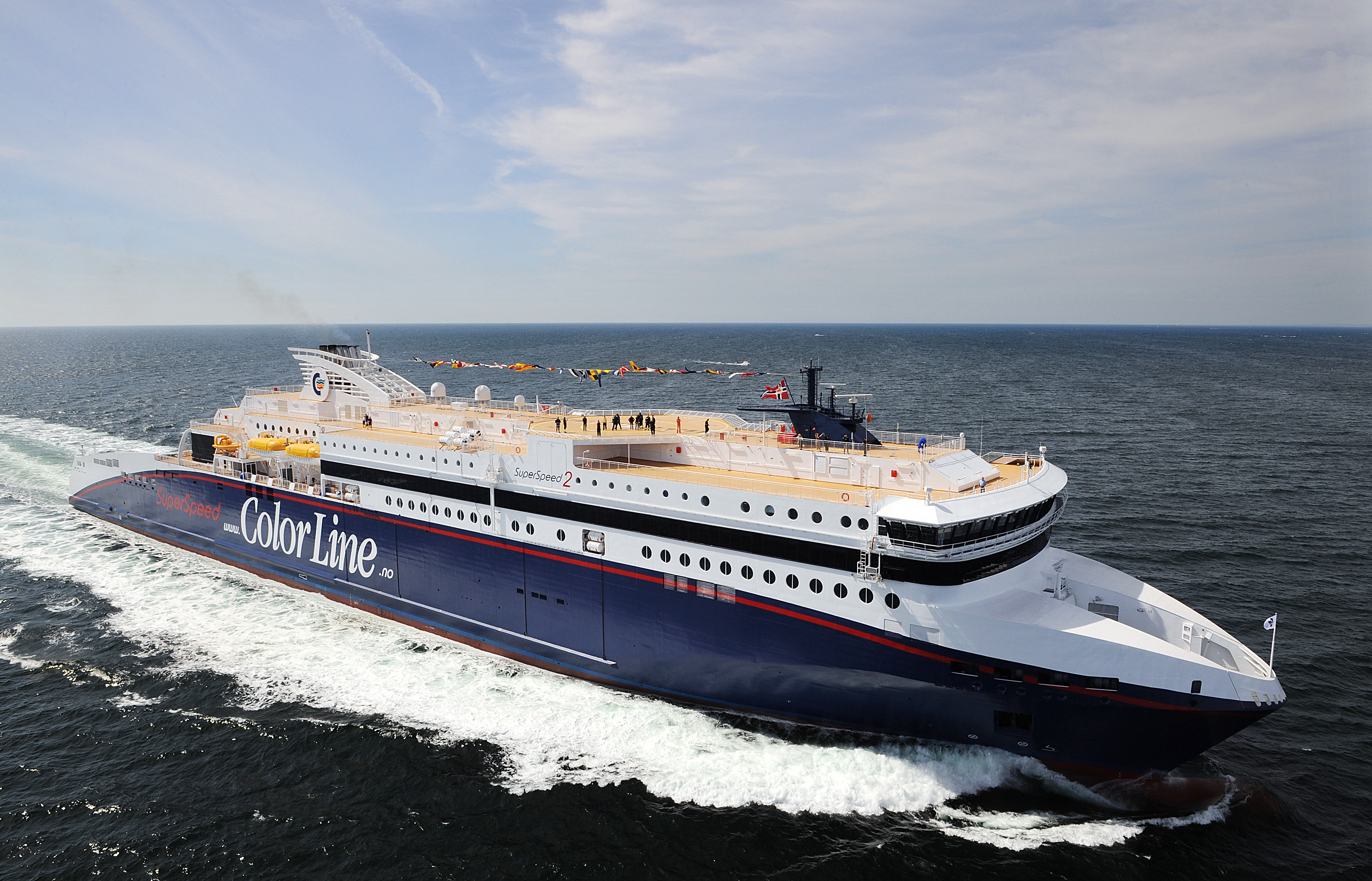
ROPAX cruiseferry, MS SuperSpeed 2, between Larvik, Norway and Hirtshals, Denmark

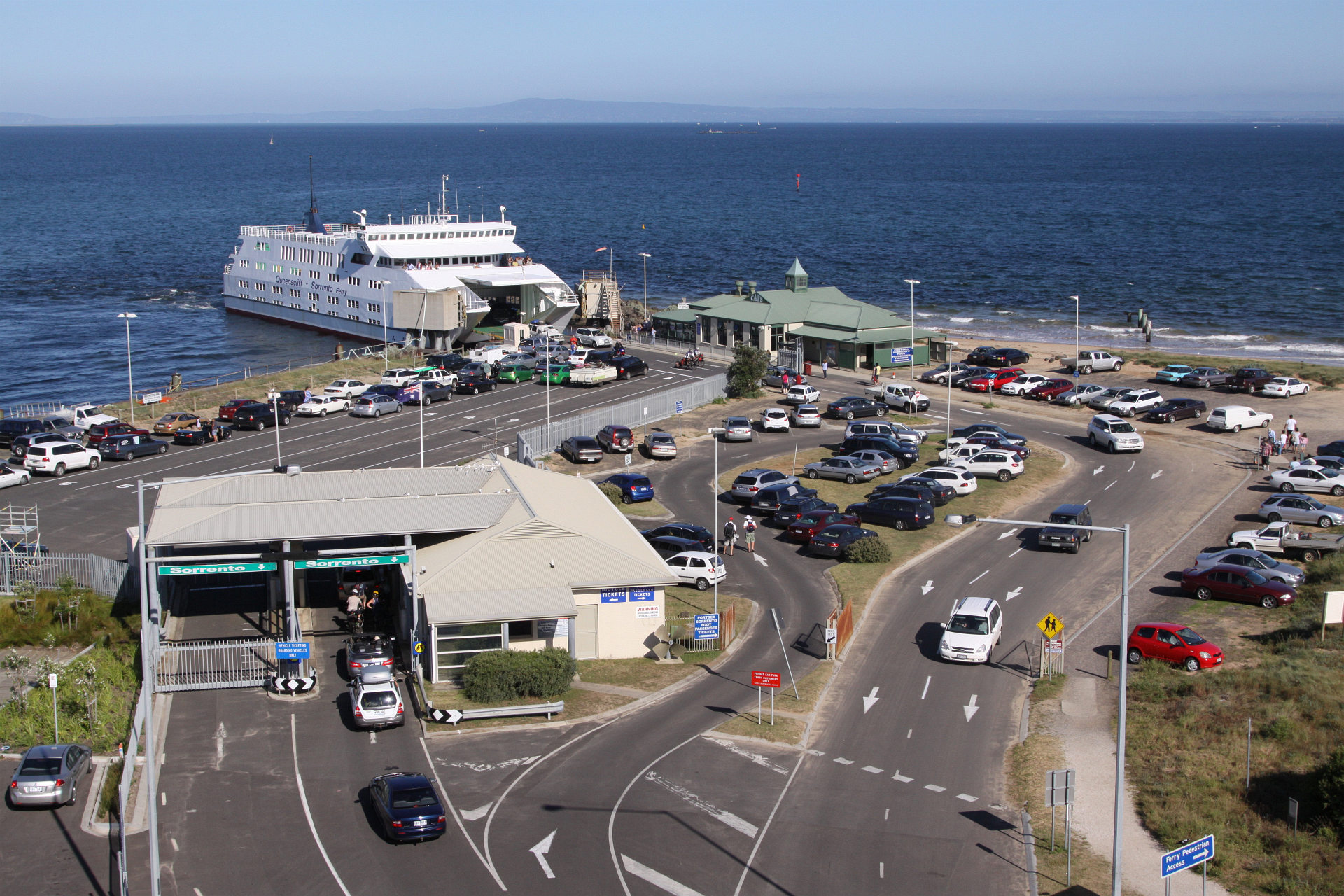
Terminal for the Peninsula Searoad Transport service, with cars leaving a ferry

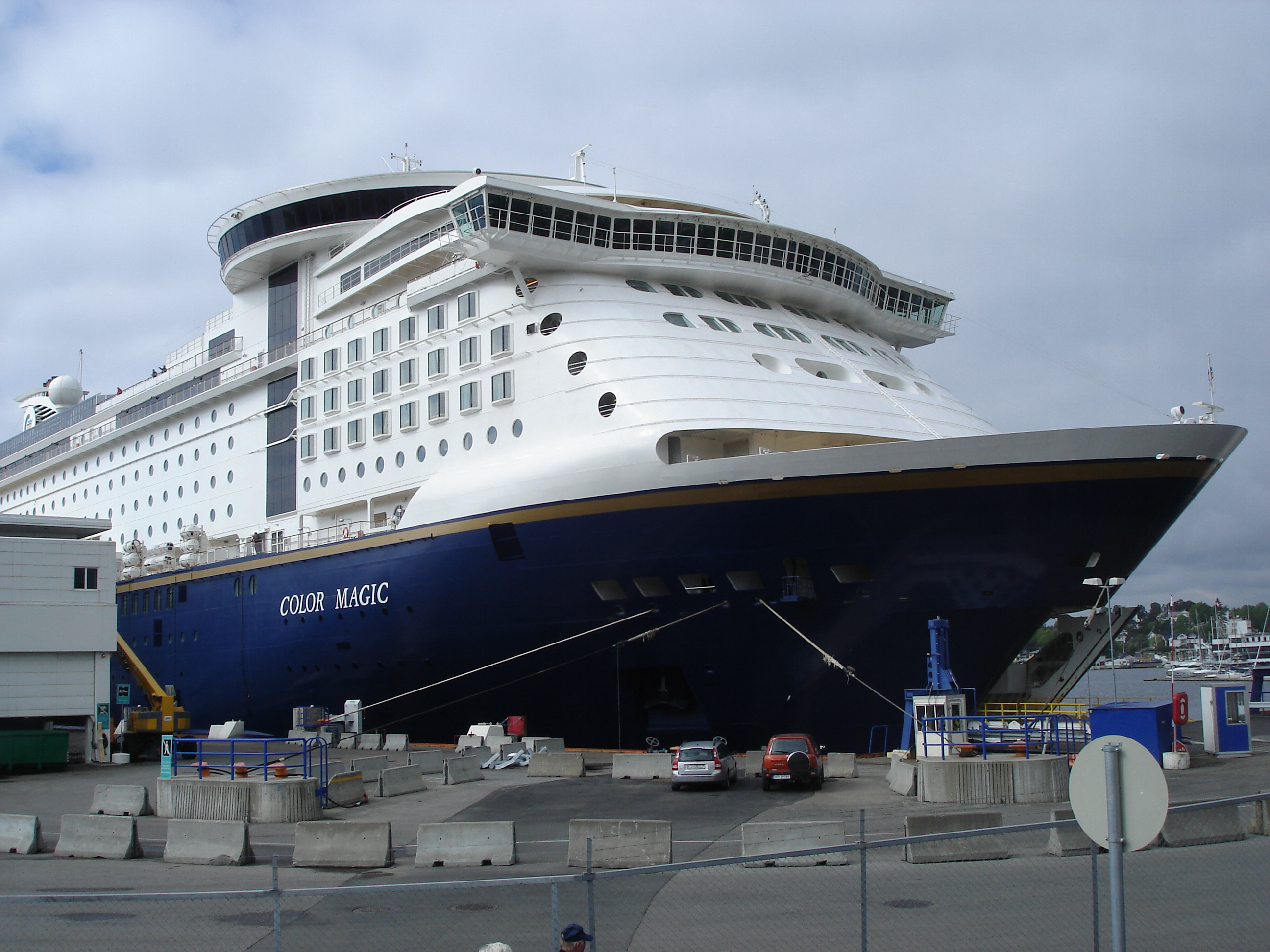
largest ro-ro passenger car ferry in the world, MS Color Magic, in Oslo, Norway

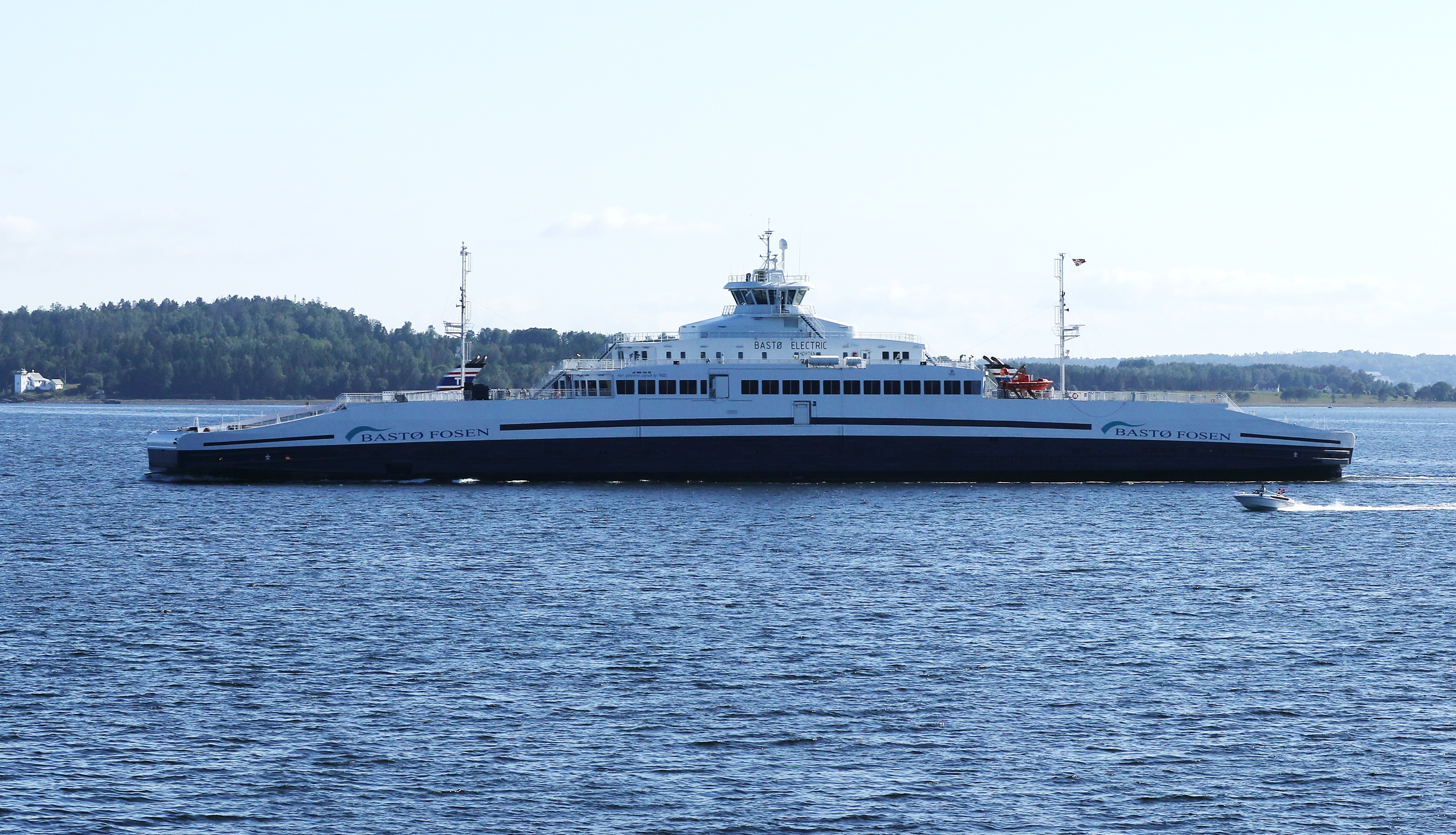
Bastø Fosen is a Norwegian ferry company that operates smaller ro-ro passenger car ferries on a short route between the towns of Horten and Moss in Norway.

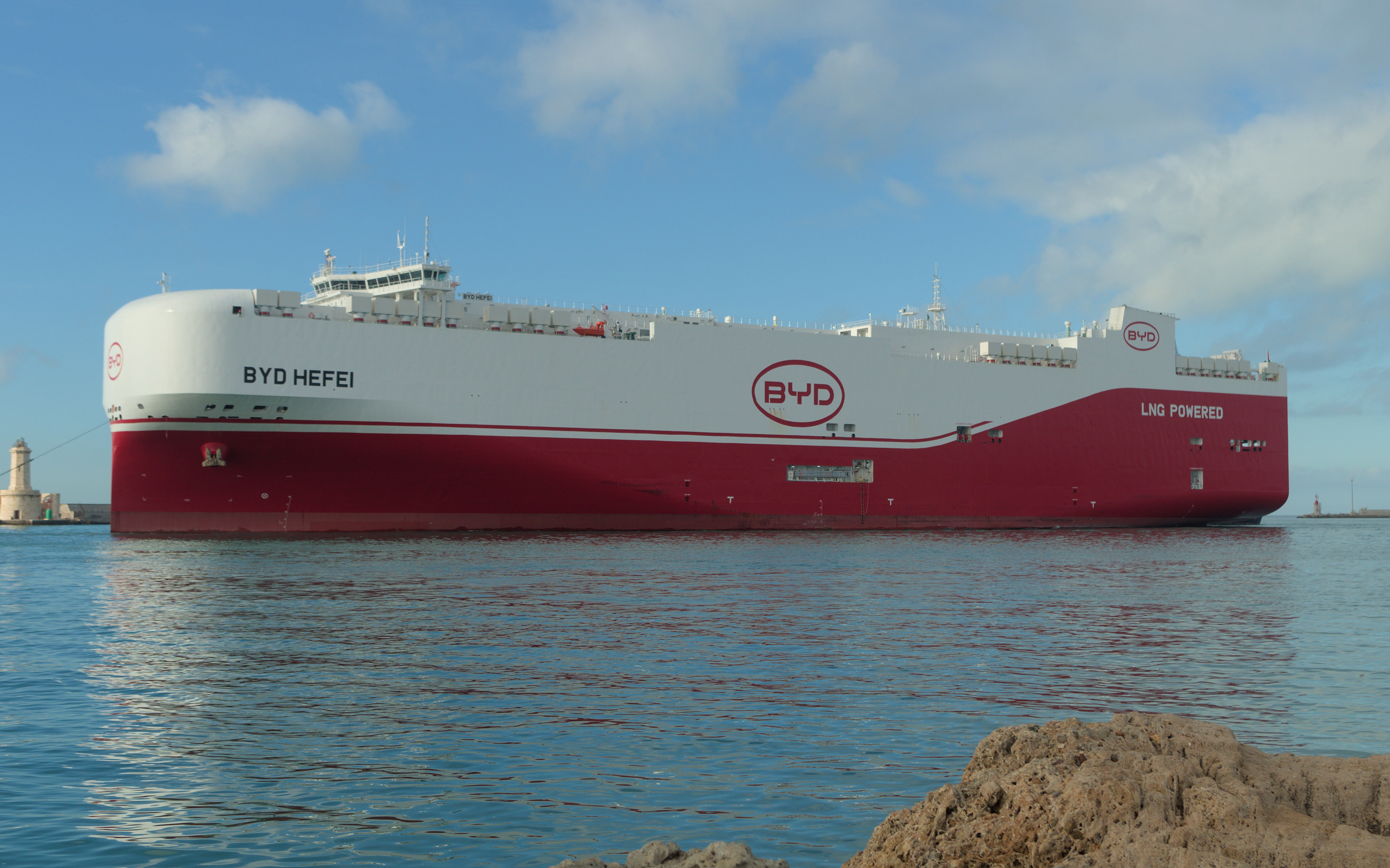
The 69,500-GT BYD Hefei, one of a series of purpose-built ro-ro transport ships owned by the Chinese plug-in electric vehicle manufacturer BYD

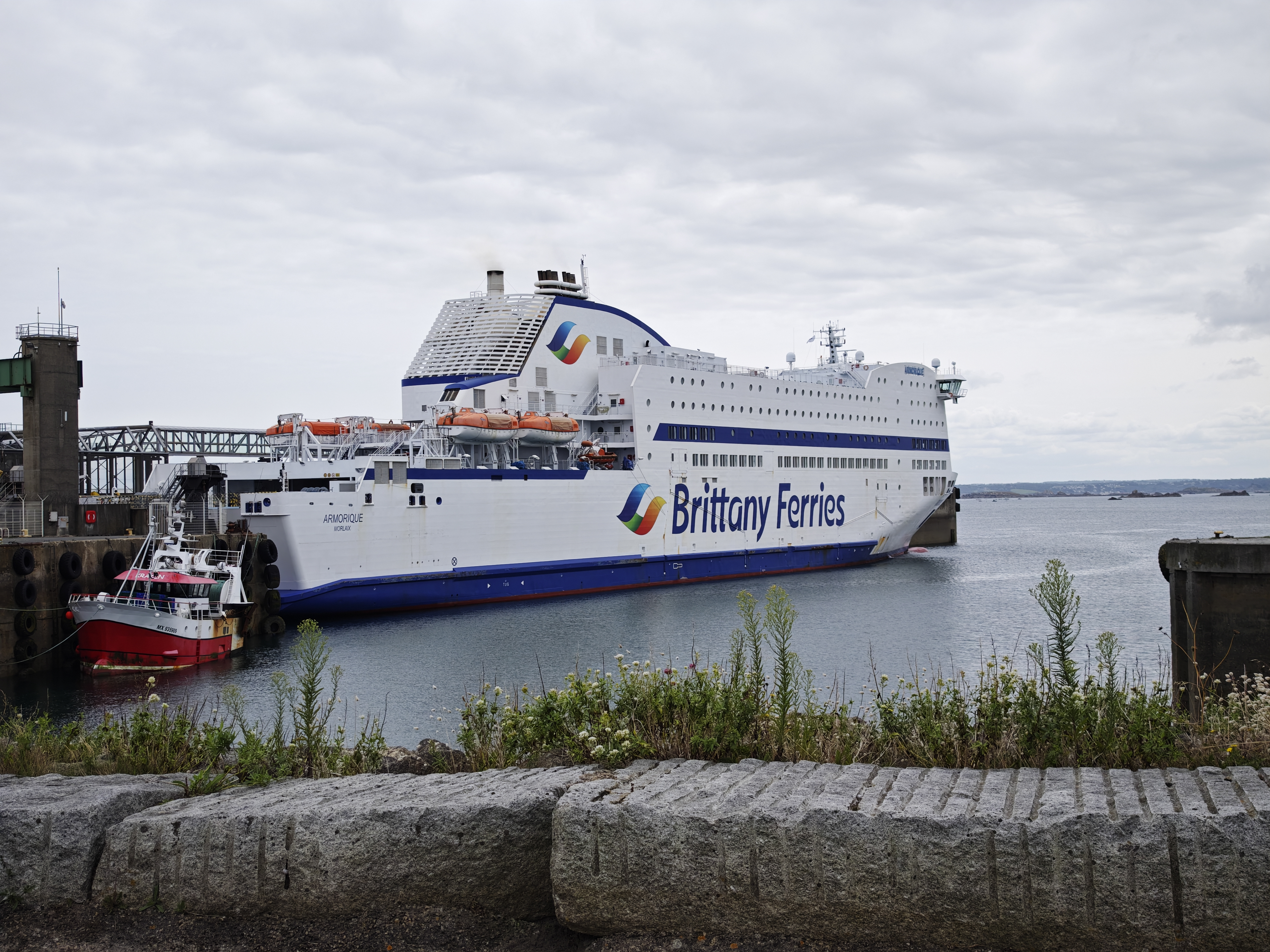
Brittany Ferries MV Armorique (2008) at the harbour

=== Car carriers ===
The first cargo ships specially fitted for the transport of large numbers of cars came into service in the early 1960s. These ships still had their own loading gear and so-called hanging decks inside. They were, for example, chartered by the German Volkswagen AG to transport vehicles to the U.S. and Canada. During the 1970s, the market for exporting and importing cars increased dramatically and correspondingly also did the number and type of ROROs .

In 1970 Japan's K Line built Toyota Maru No. 10, Japan's first pure car carrier, and in 1973 built European Highway, the largest pure car carrier (PCC) at that time, which carried 4,200 automobiles. Today's pure car carriers and their close cousins, the pure car/truck carrier (PCTC), are distinctive ships with a box-like superstructure running the entire length and breadth of the hull, fully enclosing the cargo. They typically have a stern ramp and a side ramp for dual loading of thousands of vehicles (such as cars, trucks, heavy machinery, tracked units, Mafi roll trailers, and loose statics), and extensive automatic fire control systems.

The PCTC has liftable decks to increase vertical clearance, as well as heavier decks for "high-and-heavy" cargo. A 6,500-unit car ship, with 12 decks, can have three decks which can take cargo up to 150 short tons (136 t; 134 long tons) with liftable panels to increase clearance from 1.7 to 6.7 m (5 ft 7 in to 22 ft 0 in) on some decks. Lifting decks to accommodate higher cargo reduces the total capacity. These vessels can achieve a cruising speed of 16 knots (30 km/h; 18 mph) at eco-speed, while at full speed can achieve more than 19 knots (35 km/h; 22 mph).

As of May 2026, the largest LCTC is MV Glovis Leader of approximately 10,800 units. Other large ships are the Höegh Aurora class, the inaugural vessel of a planned class of twelve, each with a capacity of 9,100 CEU. Meanwhile, the Marine Design & Research Institute of China (MARIC) is developing a new vessel class with a capacity of 12,800 CEU. The design has received Approval in Principle (AiP) from Lloyd's Register, which was granted in June 2024.

The car carrier Auriga Leader, belonging to Nippon Yusen Kaisha, built in 2008 with a capacity of 6,200 cars, is the world's first partially solar-powered ship.

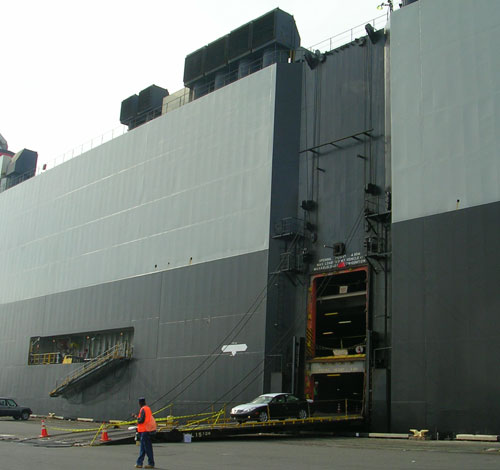
A pure car carrier ship's starboard side showing side ramp

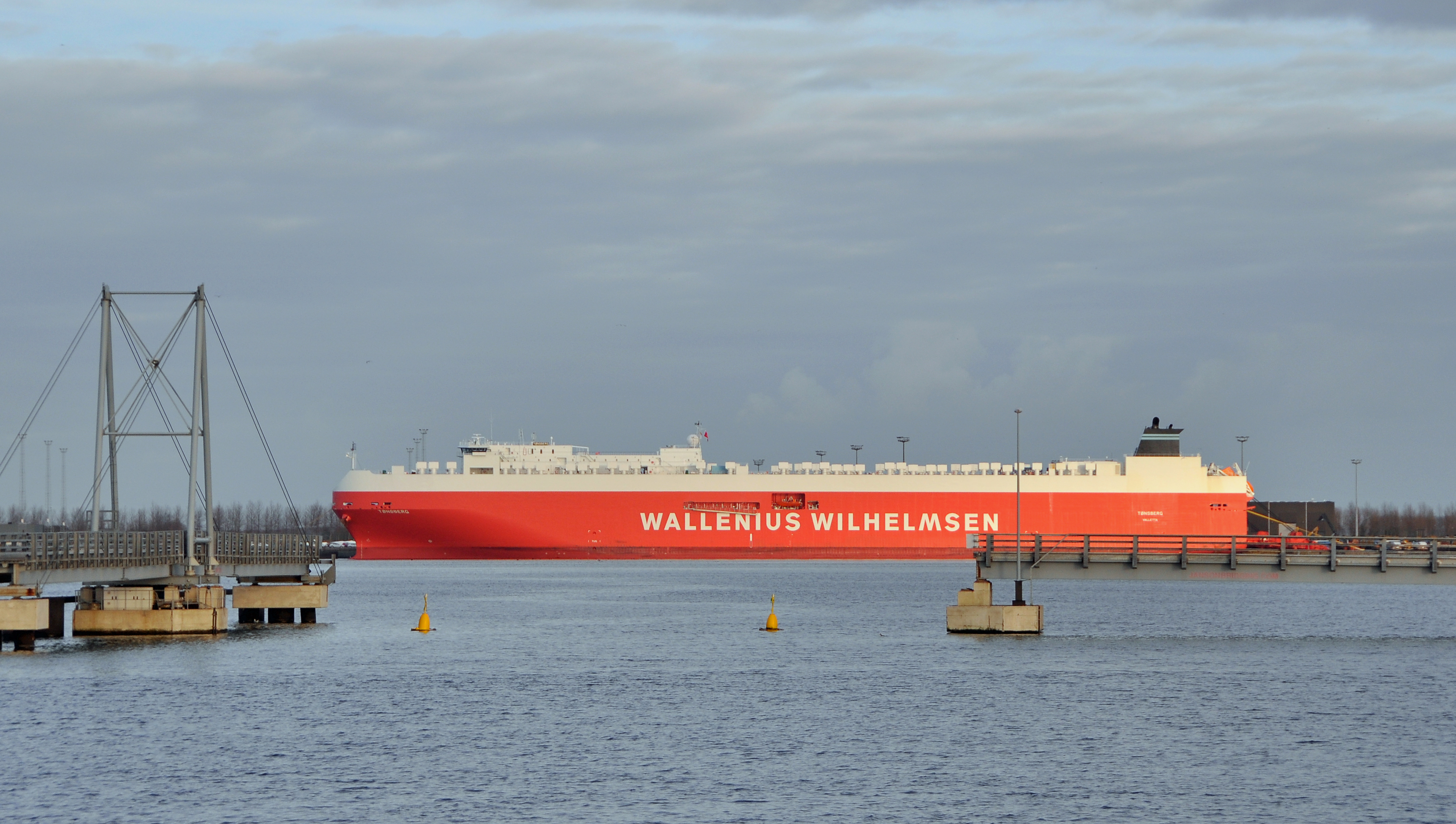
MV Tønsberg, a large car/truck carrier

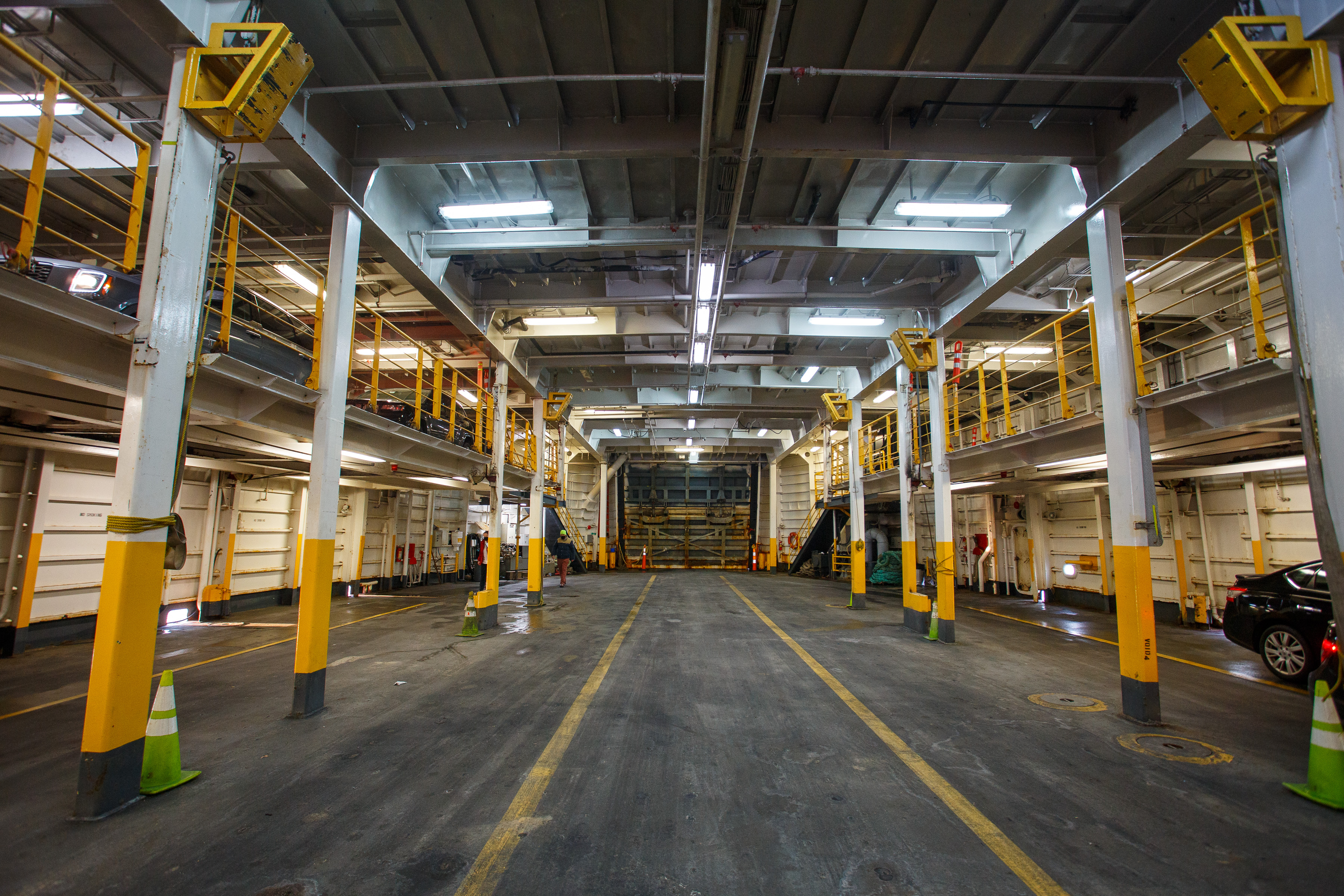
Vehicle bay of John H, of Cross Sound Ferry

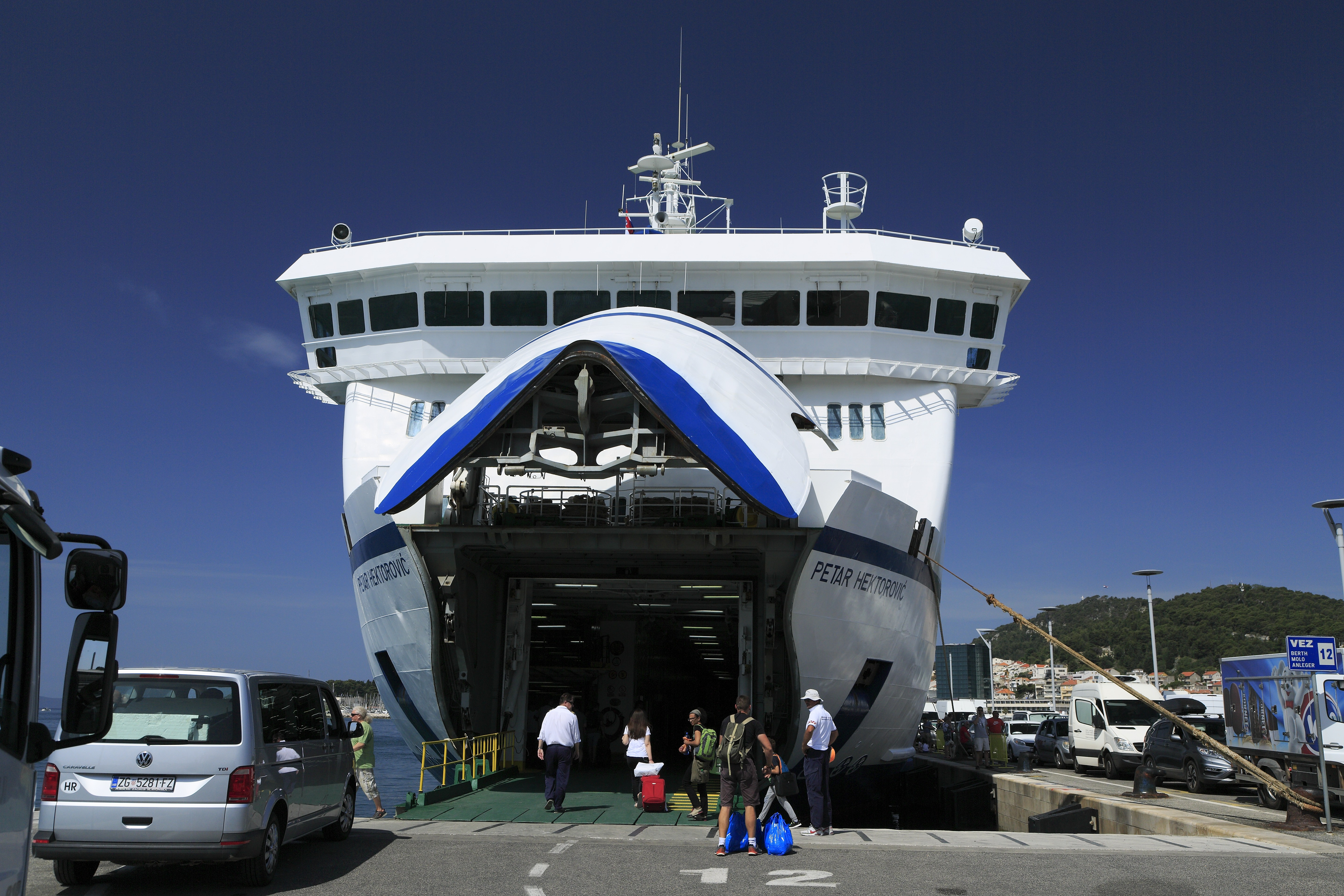
The front of MT Petar Hektorović opens up, allowing cars to enter the vehicle bay.

=== Seaworthiness ===
The seagoing RORO car ferry, with large external doors close to the waterline and open vehicle decks with few internal bulkheads, has a reputation for being a high-risk design, to the point where the acronym is sometimes derisively expanded to "roll on/roll over". An improperly secured loading door can cause a ship to take on water and sink, as happened in 1987 with Herald of Free Enterprise. Water sloshing on the vehicle deck can set up a free surface effect, making the ship unstable and causing it to capsize. Free surface water on the vehicle deck was determined by the court of inquiry to be the immediate cause of the 1968 capsize of TEV Wahine in New Zealand. It also contributed to the wreck of MS Estonia.

Despite these inherent risks, the very high freeboard improves the seaworthiness of these vessels. For example, the car carrier Cougar Ace listed 60 degrees to its port side in 2006, but did not sink, since its high enclosed sides prevented water from entering.

In late January 2016 MV Modern Express was listing off France after cargo shifted on the ship. Salvage crews secured the vessel and it was hauled into the port of Bilbao, Spain.

=== RORO variations ===
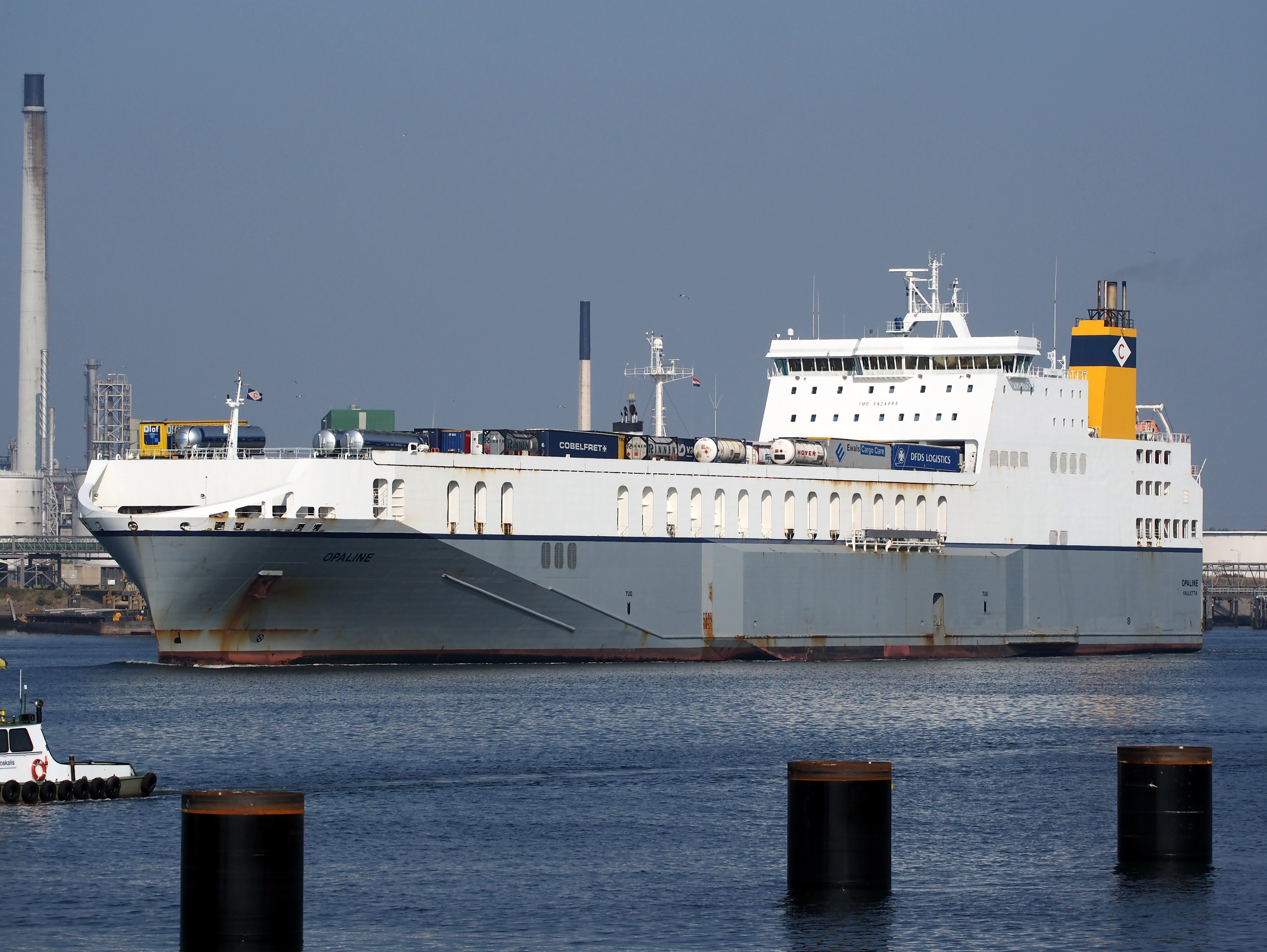
ConRO carrying trailers and containers

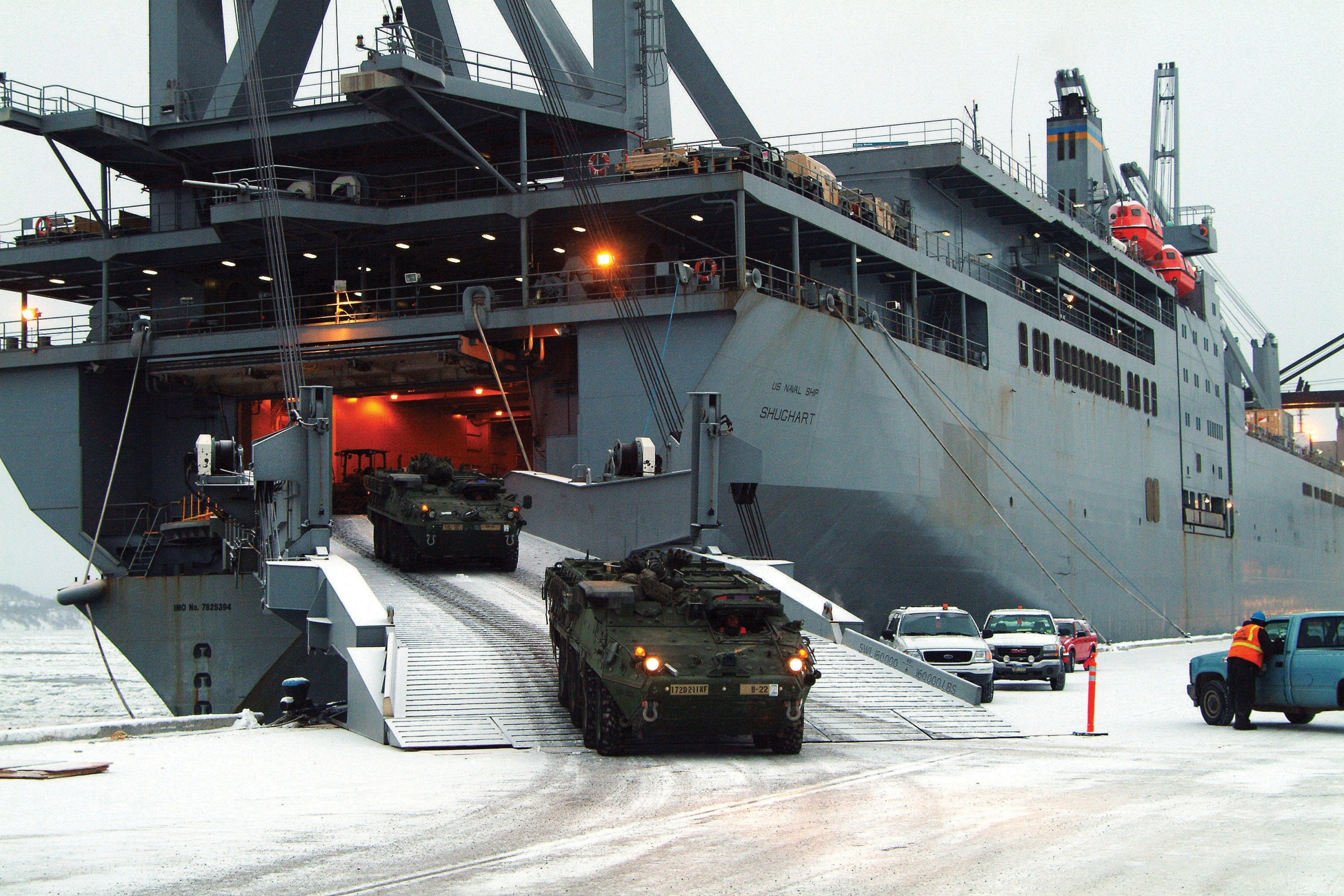
USNS Shughart, a non-combat RORO vessel, unloading Stryker armored vehicles

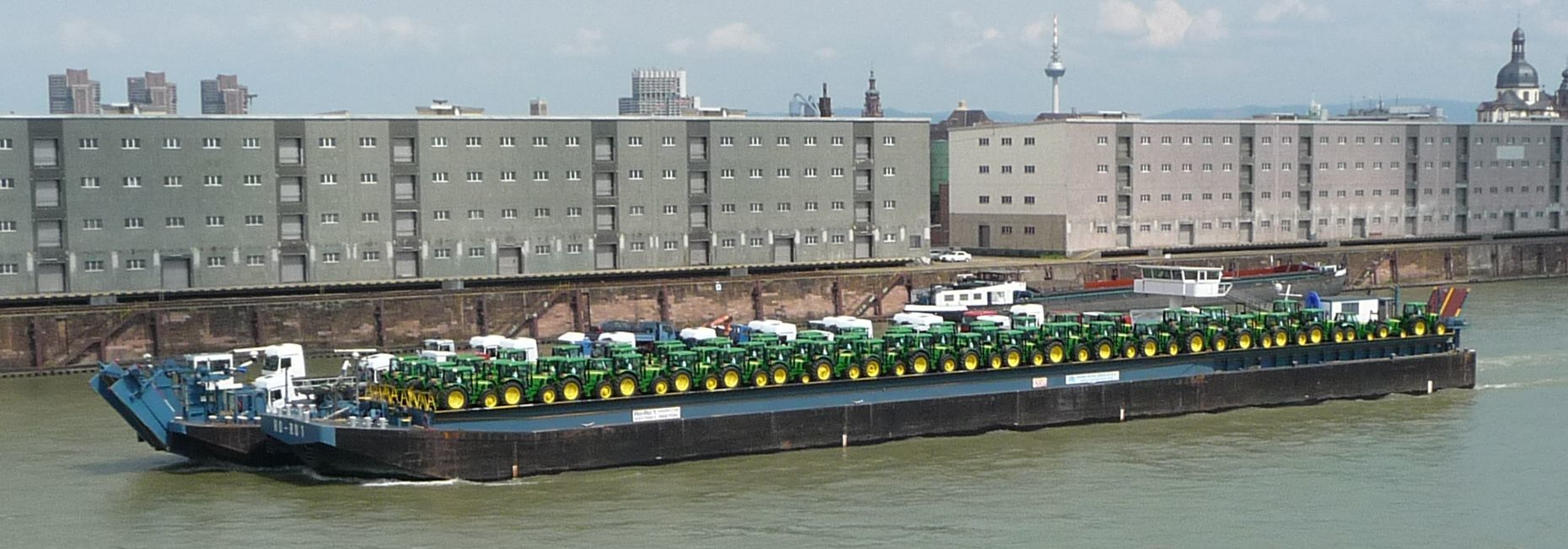
RORO barge carrying tractors

RORO variations
Variation	Decscription
ConRO	The ConRo (or RoCon) vessel is a hybrid of a RORO and a container ship. This type of vessel has a below-deck area used for vehicle storage while stacking containerized freight on the top decks. ConRo ships, such as the G4 class of the Atlantic Container Line, can carry a combination of containers, heavy equipment, oversized cargo, and automobiles. Separate internal ramp systems within the vessel segregate automobiles from other vehicles, Mafi roll trailers, and break-bulk cargo.
LMSR	Large, Medium-Speed Roll-on/Roll-off (LMSR) refers to several classes of the United States' Military Sealift Command (MSC) roll-on/roll-off type cargo ships. Some are purpose-built to carry military cargo, while others are converted.
RoLo	A RoLo (roll-on/lift-off) vessel is another hybrid vessel type, with ramps serving vehicle decks but with other cargo decks only accessible when the tides change or by the use of a crane.
ROPAX	ROPAX (roll-on/roll-off passenger) describes a RORO vessel built for freight vehicle transport along with passenger accommodation. Technically this encompasses all ferries with both a roll-on/roll-off car deck and passenger-carrying capacities; many of those with facilities for more than 500 passengers may be described as cruiseferries.

== History ==
At first, wheeled vehicles carried as cargo on oceangoing ships were treated like any other cargo. Automobiles had their fuel tanks emptied and their batteries disconnected before being hoisted into the ship's hold, where they were chocked and secured. This process was tedious and difficult, and vehicles were subject to damage and could not be used for routine travel.

An early roll-on/roll-off service was a train ferry, started in 1833 by the Monkland and Kirkintilloch Railway, which operated a wagon ferry on the Forth and Clyde Canal in Scotland.

=== Invention ===
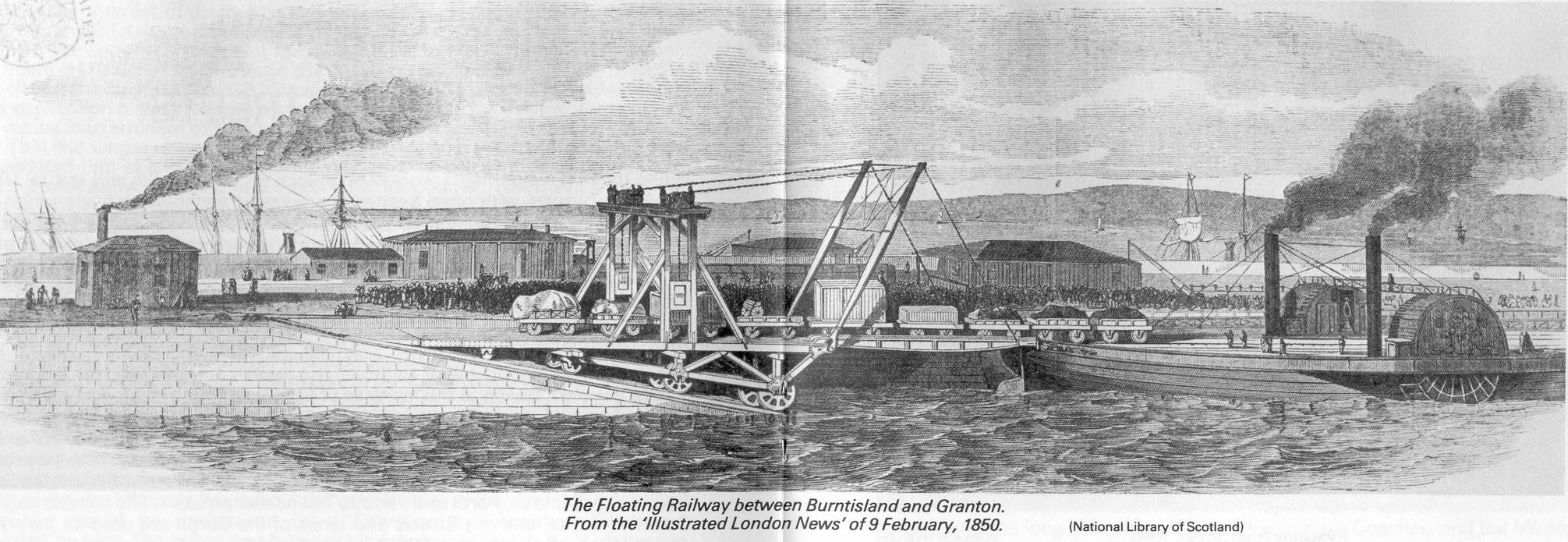
Floating Railway, opened in 1850 as the first roll-on roll-off train ferry in the world

The first modern train ferry was Leviathan, built in 1849. The Edinburgh, Leith and Newhaven Railway was formed in 1842 and the company wished to extend the East Coast Main Line further north to Dundee and Aberdeen. As bridge technology did not yet support the crossing over the Firth of Forth, which was roughly five miles (8 km) across, a different solution had to be found, primarily for the transport of goods, where efficiency was key.

The company hired the up-and-coming civil engineer Thomas Bouch, who argued for a train ferry with a roll-on/roll-off mechanism to maximise the efficiency of the system. Ferries were to be custom-built, with railway lines and matching harbour facilities at both ends to allow the rolling stock to easily drive on and off. To compensate for the changing tides, adjustable ramps were positioned at the harbours and the gantry structure height was varied by moving it along the slipway. The wagons were loaded on and off using stationary steam engines.

Bouch's ferry design. Note the adjustable ramp.

Although others had had similar ideas, Bouch was the first to put them into effect, and he did so with an attention to detail (such as design of the ferry slip) which led a subsequent President of the Institution of Civil Engineers to settle any dispute over priority of invention with the observation that "there was little merit in a simple conception of this kind, compared with a work practically carried out in all its details, and brought to perfection."

The company was persuaded to install this train ferry service to transport goods wagons across the Firth of Forth from Burntisland in Fife to Granton. The ferry itself was built by Thomas Grainger, a partner of the firm Grainger and Miller.

The service commenced on 3 February 1850. It was called "The Floating Railway" and intended as a temporary measure until the railway could build a bridge, but no bridge was opened until 1890, its construction delayed in part by repercussions from the catastrophic failure of Thomas Bouch's Tay Rail Bridge.

=== Expansion ===
Train ferries were used extensively during World War I. From 10 February 1918, high volumes of railway rolling stock, artillery and supplies for the Western Front were shipped to France from the "secret port" of Richborough, near Sandwich on the south-east coast of England.

Three train ferries were built, each with four railway tracks on the main deck, to allow up to 54 railway wagons to be shunted directly on and off the ferry. These ferries could also be used to transport motor vehicles along with railway rolling stock. Later that month a second train ferry route was established from the Port of Southampton on the south coast. In the first month of operations at Richborough, 5,000 tons were transported across the English Channel, and by the end of 1918 nearly 261,000 tons had been transported.

These ferries had many advantages over conventional shipping in World War I. It was much easier to move large, heavy artillery and tanks on ferries, as opposed to repeated loading and unloading of cargo. Manufacturers could load tanks, guns and other heavy items for shipping to the front directly onto railway wagons, which could be shunted on to a train-ferry in England and then shunted directly onto the French railway network, with direct connections to the front lines; thus many man-hours of labour were avoided.

A contemporary analysis found that to transport 1,000 tons of war material from the point of manufacture to the front by conventional means involved the use of 1,500 labourers, whereas when using train-ferries that number decreased to around 100 labourers. This was of utmost importance, as by 1918 the British railway companies had a severe labour shortage, as hundreds of thousands of skilled and unskilled labourers were away fighting at the front. The increase in heavy traffic because of the war effort meant that economies and efficiency improvements in transport had to be made wherever possible.

After the signing of the armistice on 11 November 1918, train ferries were used extensively for the return of material from the front. Indeed, according to War Office statistics, a greater tonnage of material was transported by train ferry from Richborough in 1919 than in 1918. Since the train ferries had space for motor transport as well as railway rolling stock, thousands of lorries, motor cars and "B Type" buses were returned to Britain on these ferries.

=== The landing ship, tank ===
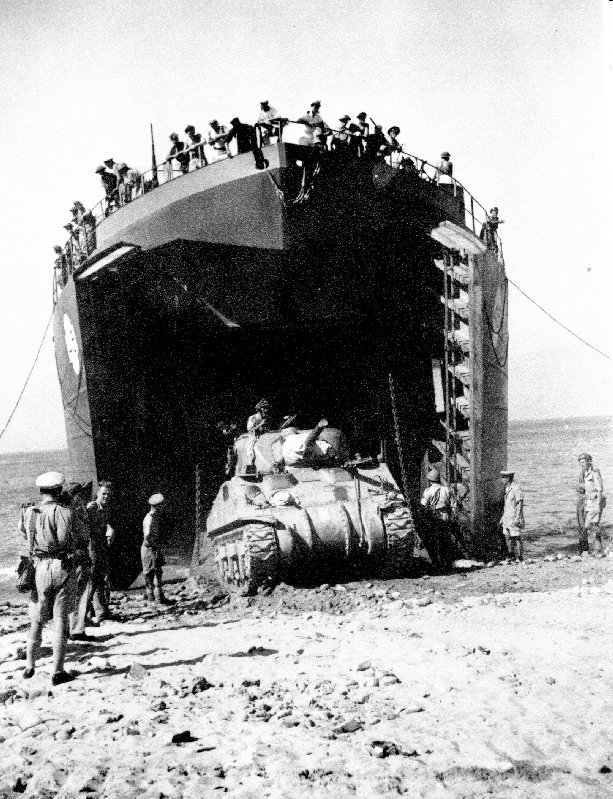
A Canadian LST off-loads an M4 Sherman during the Allied invasion of Sicily in 1943.

During World War II, landing ships (LST, "Landing Ship, Tank") were the first purpose-built seagoing ships enabling road vehicles to roll directly on and off. The British evacuation from Dunkirk in 1940 demonstrated to the Admiralty that the Allies needed relatively large, seagoing ships capable of shore-to-shore delivery of tanks and other vehicles in amphibious assaults upon the continent of Europe. As an interim measure, three 4,000 to 4,800 GRT tankers, built to pass over the restrictive bars of Lake Maracaibo, Venezuela, were selected for conversion because of their shallow draught. Bow doors and ramps were added to these ships, which became the first tank landing ships.

The first purpose-built LST design was HMS Boxer. It was a scaled down design from ideas penned by Winston Churchill. To carry 13 Churchill infantry tanks, 27 vehicles and nearly 200 men (in addition to the crew) at a speed of 18 knots (33 km/h; 21 mph), it could not have the shallow draught that would have made for easy unloading. As a result, each of the three (Boxer, Bruiser, and Thruster) ordered in March 1941 had a very long ramp stowed behind the bow doors.

In November 1941, a small delegation from the British Admiralty arrived in the United States to pool ideas with the United States Navy's Bureau of Ships with regard to development of ships and also including the possibility of building further Boxers in the United States. During this meeting, it was decided that the Bureau of Ships would design these vessels. As with the standing agreement these would be built by the United States so British shipyards could concentrate on building vessels for the Royal Navy. The specification called for vessels capable of crossing the Atlantic and the original title given to them was "Atlantic Tank Landing Craft" (Atlantic (T.L.C.)). Calling a vessel 300 ft (91 m) long a "craft" was considered a misnomer and the type was re-christened "Landing Ship, Tank (2)", or "LST (2)".

The LST(2) design incorporated elements of the first British LCTs from their designer, Sir Rowland Baker, who was part of the British delegation. This included sufficient buoyancy in the ships' sidewalls that they would float even with the tank deck flooded. The LST(2) gave up the speed of HMS Boxer at only 10 knots (19 km/h; 12 mph) but had a similar load while drawing only 3 ft (0.91 m) forward when beaching. In three separate acts dated 6 February 1942, 26 May 1943, and 17 December 1943, the United States Congress provided the authority for the construction of LSTs along with a host of other auxiliaries, destroyer escorts, and assorted landing craft. The enormous building program quickly gathered momentum. Such a high priority was assigned to the construction of LSTs that the previously laid keel of an aircraft carrier was hastily removed to make room for several LSTs to be built in her place. The keel of the first LST was laid down on 10 June 1942 at Newport News, Virginia, and the first standardized LSTs were floated out of their building dock in October. Twenty-three were in commission by the end of 1942.

=== ROROs for road vehicles ===
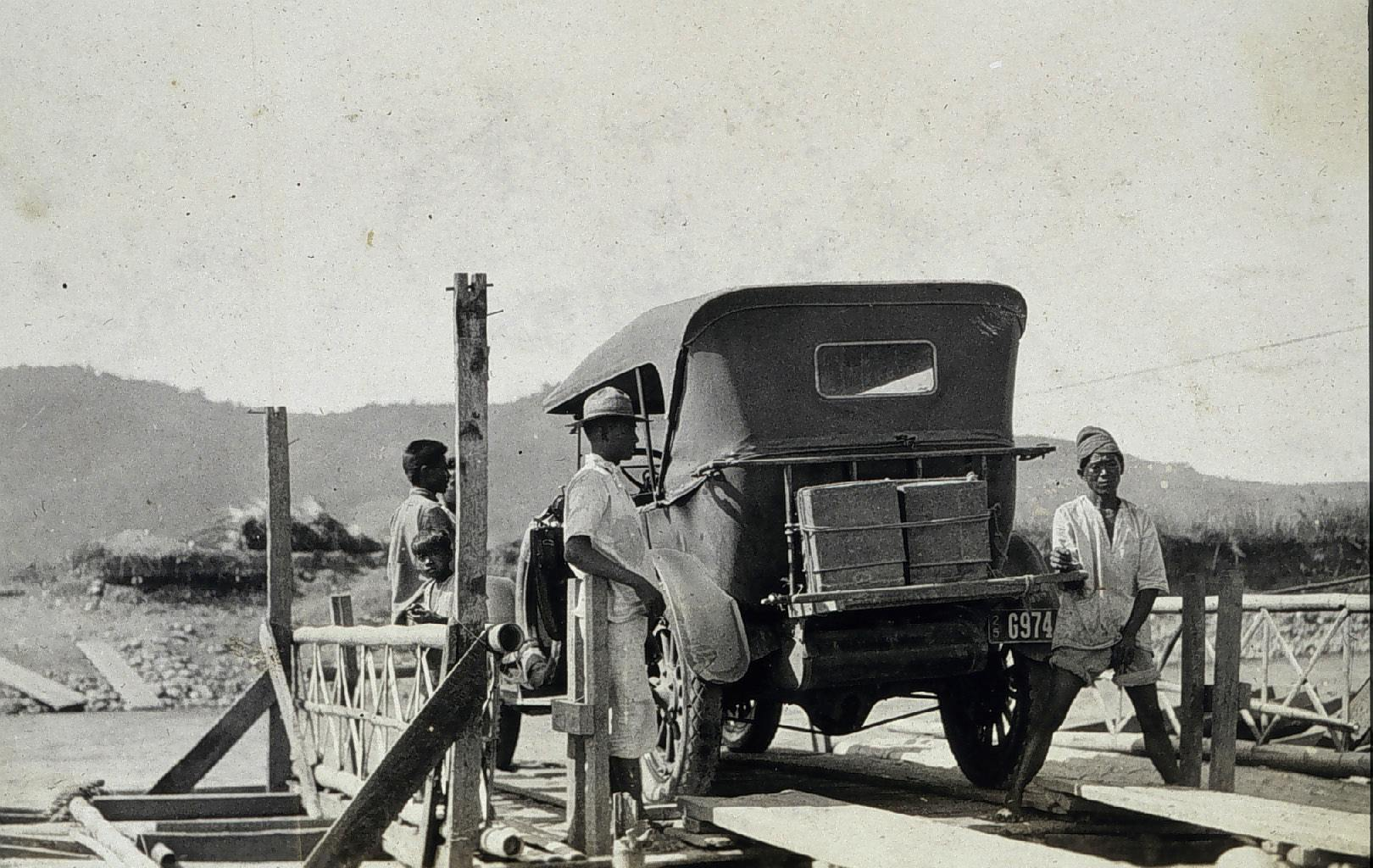
Ferry boat in the southern Philippines in 1925

SS Empire Doric was one of the first commercial RORO ferries. It was built as an LST and is pictured entering the harbour in Malta.

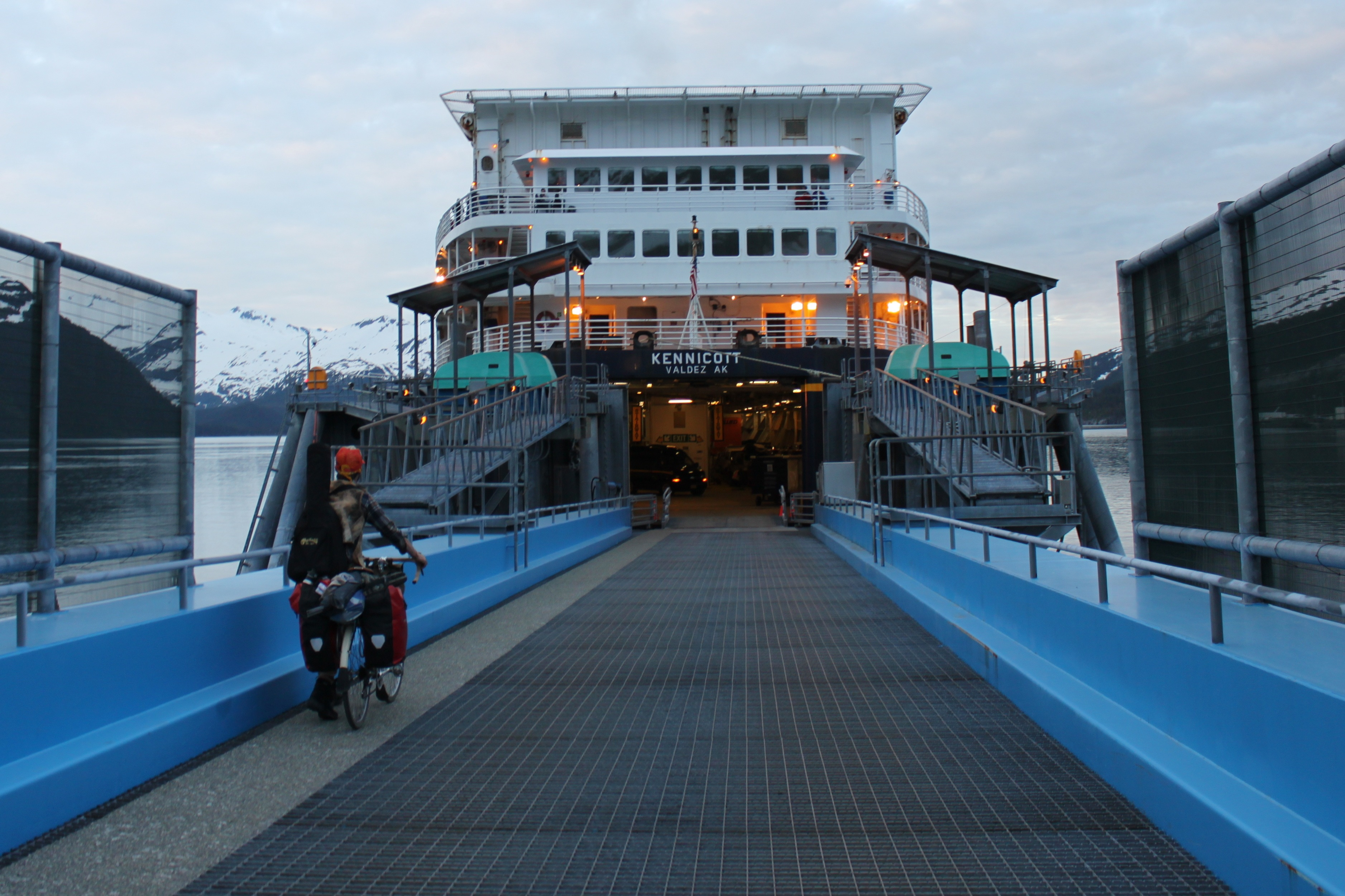
All ships of the Alaska Marine Highway employ RORO systems.

At the end of the first world war vehicles were brought back from France to Richborough Port drive-on-drive-off using the train ferry. During the war British servicemen recognised the great potential of landing ships and craft. The idea was simple; if you could drive tanks, guns and lorries directly onto a ship and then drive them off at the other end directly onto a beach, then theoretically you could use the same landing craft to carry out the same operation in the civilian commercial market, providing there were reasonable port facilities. From this idea grew the worldwide roll-on/roll-off ferry industry of today. In the period between the wars Lieutenant Colonel Frank Bustard formed the Atlantic Steam Navigation Company (ASN), with a view to cheap transatlantic travel; this never materialised, but during the war he observed trials on Brighton Sands of an LST in 1943 when its peacetime capabilities were obvious.

In early 1946 the company approached the Admiralty with a request to purchase three of these vessels. The Admiralty were unwilling to sell, but after negotiations agreed to let the ASN have the use of three vessels on bareboat charter at a rate of £13 6s 8d per day. These vessels were LSTs 3519, 3534, and 3512. They were renamed Empire Baltic, Empire Cedric, and Empire Celtic, perpetuating the name of White Star Line ships in combination with the "Empire" ship naming of vessels in government service during the war.

On the morning of 11 September 1946 the first voyage of the Atlantic Steam Navigation Company took place when Empire Baltic sailed from Tilbury to Rotterdam with a full load of 64 vehicles for the Dutch Government. The original three LSTs were joined in 1948 by another vessel, LST 3041, renamed Empire Doric, after the ASN were able to convince commercial operators to support the new route between Preston and the Northern Ireland port of Larne. The first sailing of this new route was on 21 May 1948 by Empire Cedric. After the inaugural sailing Empire Cedric continued on the Northern Ireland service, offering initially a twice-weekly service. Empire Cedric was the first vessel of the ASN fleet to hold a passenger certificate, and was allowed to carry fifty passengers. Thus Empire Cedric became the first vessel in the world to operate as a commercial/passenger roll-on/roll-off ferry, and the ASN became the first commercial company to offer this type of service.

The first RORO service crossing the English Channel began from Dover in 1953. In 1954, the British Transport Commission (BTC) took over the ASN under the Labour Governments nationalization policy. In 1955 another two LSTs where chartered into the existing fleet, Empire Cymric and Empire Nordic, bringing the fleet strength to seven. The Hamburg service was terminated in 1955, and a new service was opened between Antwerp and Tilbury. The fleet of seven ships was to be split up with the usual three ships based at Tilbury and the others maintaining the Preston to Northern Ireland service.

During late 1956, the entire fleet of ASN were taken over for use in the Mediterranean during the Suez Crisis, and the drive-on/drive-off services were not re-established until January 1957. At this point ASN were made responsible for the management of twelve Admiralty LST(3)s brought out of reserve as a result of the Suez Crisis too late to see service.

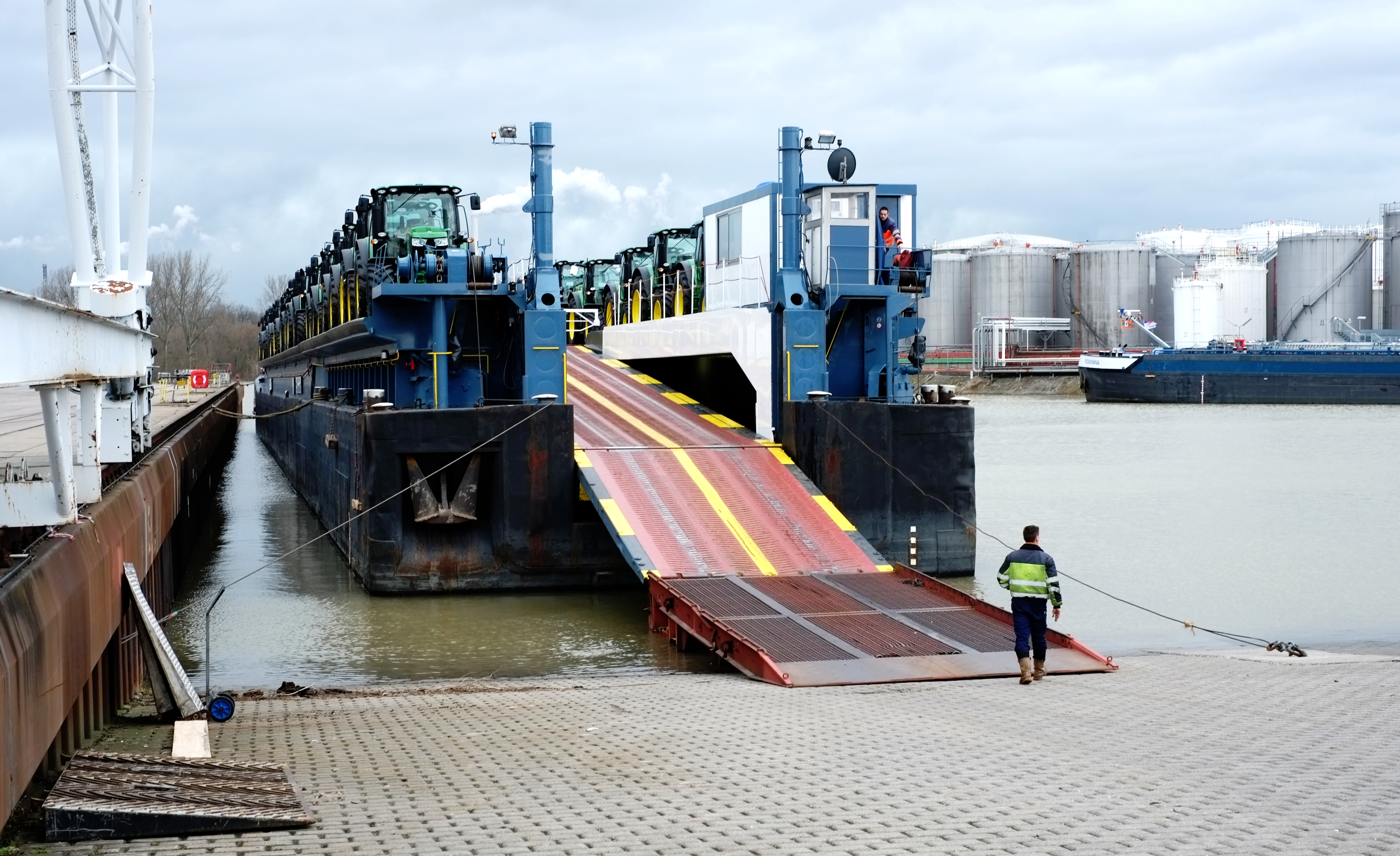
A river barge carrying tractors

=== Further developments ===
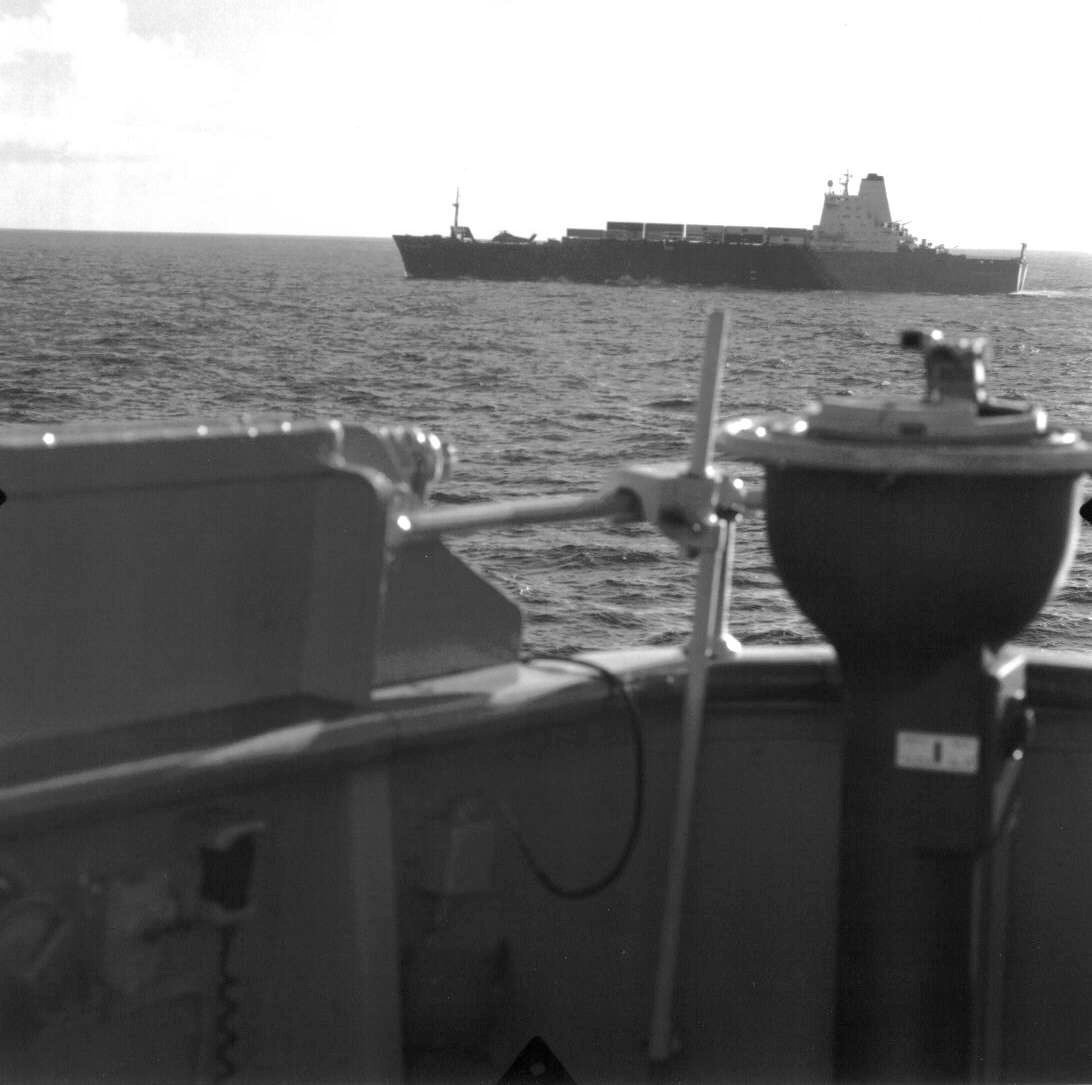
Atlantic Conveyor approaching the Falklands on or about 19 May 1982

The first roll-on/roll-off vessel that was purpose-built to transport loaded semi trucks was Searoad of Hyannis, which began operation in 1956. While modest in capacity, it could transport three semi trailers between Hyannis in Massachusetts and Nantucket Island, even in ice conditions.

In 1957, the United States military issued a contract to the Sun Shipbuilding and Dry Dock Company in Chester, Pennsylvania, for the construction of a new type of motorized vehicle carrier. The ship, USNS Comet, had a stern ramp as well as interior ramps, which allowed cars to drive directly from the dock, onto the ship, and into place. Loading and unloading was sped up dramatically. Comet also had an adjustable chocking system for locking cars onto the decks and a ventilation system to remove exhaust gases that accumulate during vehicle loading.

During the 1982 Falklands War, SS Atlantic Conveyor was requisitioned as an emergency aircraft and helicopter transport for British Hawker Siddeley Harrier STOVL fighter planes; one Harrier was kept fueled, armed, and ready to VTOL launch for emergency air protection against long range Argentine aircraft. Atlantic Conveyor was sunk by Argentine Exocet missiles after offloading the Harriers to proper aircraft carriers, but the vehicles and helicopters still aboard were lost.

After the war, a concept called the shipborne containerized air-defense system (SCADS) proposed a modular system to quickly convert a large RORO into an emergency aircraft carrier with ski jump, fueling systems, radar, defensive missiles, munitions, crew quarters, and work spaces. The entire system could be installed in about 48 hours on a container ship or RORO, when needed for operations up to a month unsupplied. The system could quickly be removed and stored again when the conflict was over. The Soviet Union flying Yakovlev Yak-38 fighter aircraft also tested operations using the civilian RORO ships Agostinio Neto and Nikolai Cherkasov.

== See also ==
- Autorack – Railway rolling stock used to transport automobiles
- Car carrier trailer – Automobile which hauls other automobiles
- Car float – Unpowered barge with railroad tracks mounted on its deck
- Cruise ferry – Type of cruise ship
- Frank Bustard – British shipping pioneer
- Intermodal container – Standardized reusable metal crate for transporting goods
- Lift-on/lift-off – Type of cargo ship
- List of cargo types
- List of roll-on/roll-off vessel accidents
- Merchant vessel – Civilian boat or ship that transports cargo or carries passengers for hire
- Roll-on/roll-off discharge facility
- Rolling highway – Process of shipping loaded trucks on railway cars
- Train ferry – Ferryboat carrying railroad cars onboard
- Washington State Ferries – Public ferry service in Washington, US
- Yacht transport – Recreational boat or ship
