= Flyaway Deep Ocean Salvage System =

US Navy system to raise sunken objects

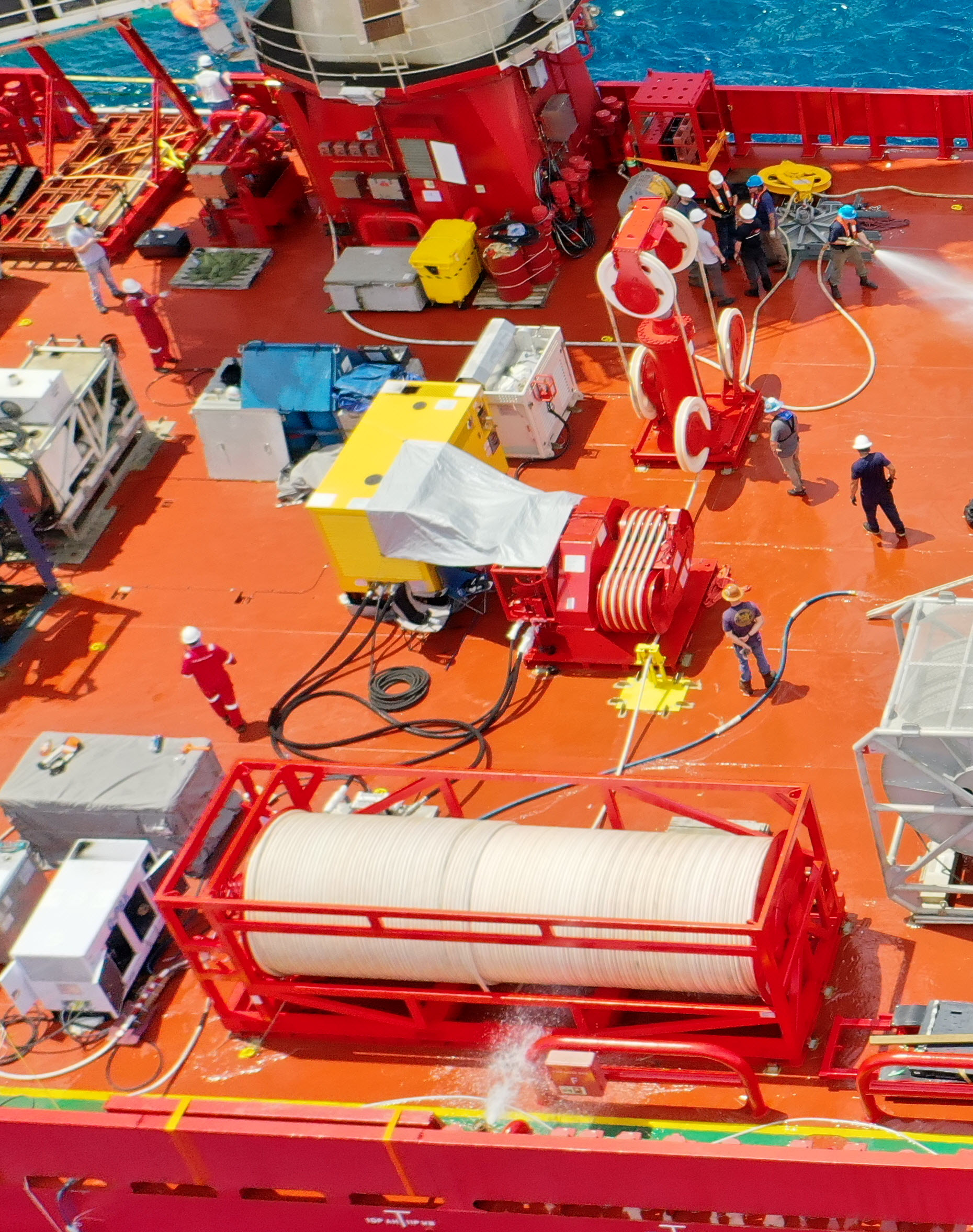
FADOSS as deployed during the 2019 recovery of a C-2A Greyhound from a depth of approximately 18,500 ft (5,600 m) in the Philippine Sea. From top to bottom, visible major components include the multi-sheave Ship Motion Compensator, Traction Winch, and Take-up Storage Reel

The Flyaway Deep Ocean Salvage System (FADOSS) is a modular system used by the United States Navy to raise sunken objects, such as aircraft or small vessels. It has a maximum lifting capacity of 60,000 lb (27,000 kg), and can recover objects from depths of 20,000 ft (6,100 m).

== Design ==
FADOSS is operated by Naval Sea Systems Command, Supervisor of Salvage and Diving (SUPSALV). It is designed to be airlifted to sites and installed on a "vessel of opportunity" as required for rapid deployment. Installation includes welding to the ship's deck to support the load, which requires approximately 24 hours.

The major components of FADOSS include:

- Ship Motion Compensator (SMC)
- Traction Winch
- Take-up Storage Reel
- Hydraulic power unit
- Air compressor
- Air control manifold

The SMC is the key component, as it uses a pressurized ram cylinder and sheaves to compensate for ship motions, limiting the variance in line tension.

The recovery line and storage reel are sized for the job, and are available in 15,000 lb (6,800 kg), 30,000 lb (14,000 kg), and 60,000 lb (27,000 kg) sizes. A remotely operated underwater vehicle (ROV) is used to locate the item(s) to be salvaged and attach rigging for recovery. After the recovery line is lowered to the site, the ROV attaches the line to the rigging and FADOSS uses the traction winch to reel in the line, lifting the object to the surface.

== Operations ==
Development of the SMC began with testing a ram tensioner in the early 1980s; the basic tensioner design had been used since the 1960s for underway replenishment operations, in which two ships moving next to each other transferred items by a horizontal line. By 1986, the system had been named FADOSS, capable of recovering items weighing up to 55,000 lb (25,000 kg) from depths of 20,000 ft (6,100 m) using an aramid-fiber line. FADOSS systems are stationed in Williamsburg, Virginia and Port Hueneme, California.

- A CH-46E Sea Knight was recovered off the coast of Somalia in May 1993 using FADOSS, mounted on USNS Catawba.
- FADOSS lifted a hydrothermal vent nicknamed Roane from the Main Endeavour Field of the Juan de Fuca Ridge in 1998.
- A F-16 Falcon was recovered from a depth of 16,400 ft (5,000 m) near the coast of Japan using FADOSS in August 2012. Phoenix International Holdings was the contractor, operating from USNS Navajo.
- A C-2A Greyhound that crashed in 2017 was recovered from the Philippine Sea in May 2019 by FADOSS, which was used because the estimated 18,500 ft (5,600 m) depth exceeded the on-site recovery depth capability of the United States Seventh Fleet. At the time, it was the deepest aircraft recovery.
- Parts from the wreck of a Royal Canadian Air Force CH-148 Cyclone helicopter were recovered from the Mediterranean Sea using FADOSS in June 2020, operating from EDT Hercules. (Note: Supply Vessel, IMO number: 9491422, completed in 2014)
- In March 2021, FADOSS was used to recover a MH-60S Seahawk helicopter from a depth of 19,075 ft (5,814 m) near Okinawa. The salvage set a record for deepest airframe recovered. ROV CURV-21 was used to set the line and rigging. For that recovery, the system was welded to the deck of MPOV Grand Canyon II. (Note: Multi Purpose Offshore Vessel, IMO number: 9653874, completed in 2015)
- FADOSS was used to recover a F-35 Lightning from the South China Sea in March 2022. The jet was recovered from a depth of approximately 12,400 ft (3,800 m); FADOSS operated from DSCV Picasso. (Note: Offshore Support Vessel, IMO number: 9698783, completed in 2018)
- An F/A-18 Super Hornet that was blown off the deck of USS Harry S. Truman during heavy weather was recovered by FADOSS from the Mediterranean Sea a month later in August 2022. The recovery depth was 9,500 ft (2,900 m), using MPV Everest. (Note: Multipurpose Vessel, IMO number: 9769130, completed in 2017)
