= CURV =

Early remotely operated underwater vehicle

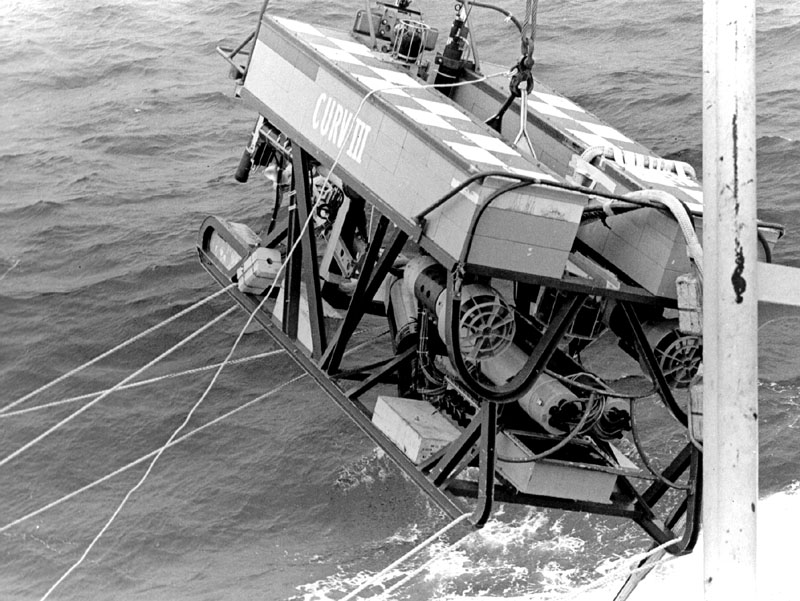
U.S. Navy CURV-III during Pisces III rescue

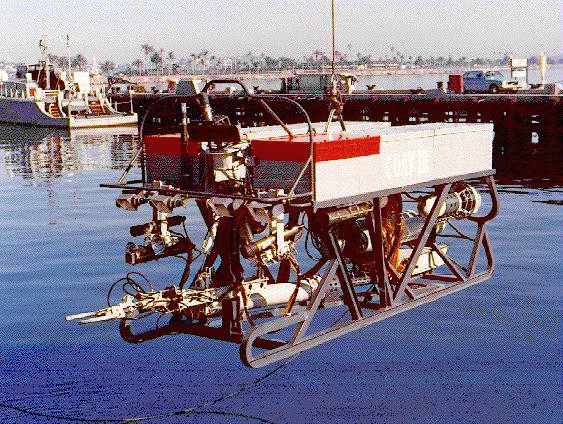
U.S. Navy CURV-III

CURV-III was the fourth generation of the United States Navy Cable-controlled Undersea Recovery Vehicle (CURV). CURV was a prototype for remotely operated underwater vehicles and a pioneer for teleoperation. It became famous in 1966 when CURV-I was used to recover a hydrogen bomb from the floor of the Mediterranean Sea. In 1973, CURV-III performed the deepest underwater rescue in history when it rescued two men 1,575 feet (480 m) from the ocean surface who were stranded 76 hours in the submersible Pisces III with just minutes of air remaining. The CURV-III became known in the Great Lakes region in 1976 when it was used to survey the wreck of the SS Edmund Fitzgerald. CURV-21 is the current generation that replaced CURV-III.

== History ==
CURV was developed by Naval Ordnance Test Station, Pasadena, California, US in the early 1960s. It was initially designed to recover test ordnance lost off San Clemente Island at depths as great as 2,000 feet (610 m). CURV was the pioneer for teleoperation. CURV-III is the fourth generation of CURV. After the Space Shuttle Challenger disaster, CURV III was transferred to the Navy's Supervisor of Salvage who directed that it be upgraded from 10,000 feet (3,000 m) operations to 20,000 feet (6,100 m). The CURV-21 is the next generation following CURV-III and was built as its direct replacement.

CURV-III was sent to the National Museum of the U.S. Navy in 2012 and she is located in the Cold War Gallery.

== Features ==
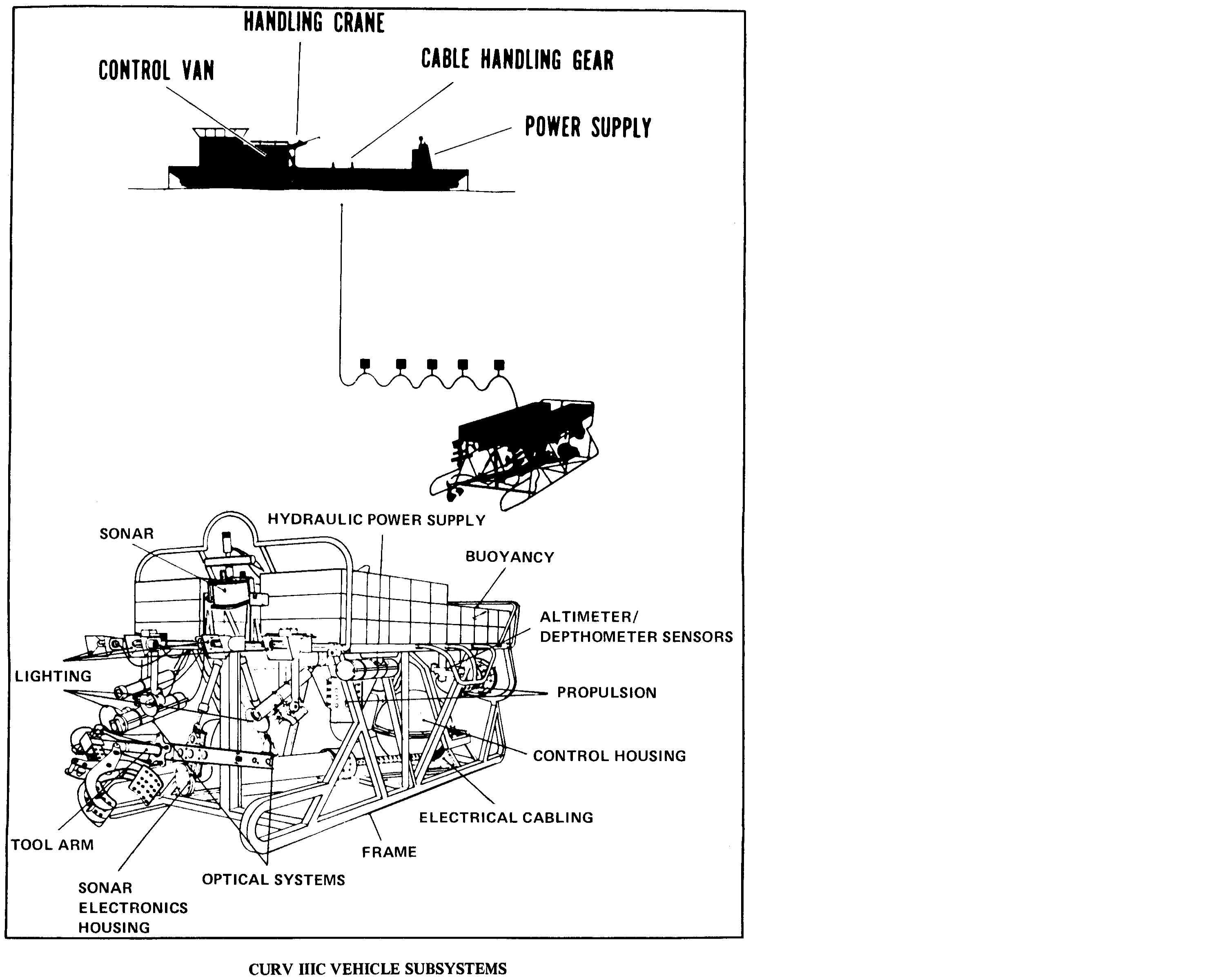
Diagram of CURV-III's remotely operated underwater vehicle subsystems

CURV-III had a functional design capable of operations at 10,000 feet (3,000 m). It had an open metal frame that was 6.5 feet (2.0 m) by 6.5 feet (2.0 m) by 15 feet (4.6 m), weighed approximately 5,400 pounds (2,400 kg), and was slightly buoyant in water. A cable and surface equipment enabled deployment and operation of the vehicle from a surface support ship. The CURV-III carried:

[T]wo Vidicon television cameras, four mercury-vapor headlights, two mercury-vapor spotlights, and a 35-millimeter camera with a 500 frame color film capacity and strobe light ... mounted on two independent pan-and-tilt units, each with 360 degrees of lateral and 180 degrees of vertical movement. The vehicle thus has full viewing and self-inspection capability.

Other support systems included active and passive sonar, altimeter, depthometer, and compass. It had a tool assembly mounted on the bow that included a manipulator claw. Other tools and lifting devices could be mounted for particular tasks.

== Notable operations ==
=== 1966 H-bomb recovery ===
In the Palomares incident of 17 January 1966, a hydrogen bomb was lost in the Mediterranean Sea when a B-52 bomber collided with a KC-135 tanker near Palomares, Spain. The bomb was located, at a depth of 2,900 feet (880 m), by the United States Navy submersible DSV Alvin after a 2½ month search. After Alvin was unsuccessful in recovering the bomb, the Navy brought in CURV-I. CURV-I was successful in attaching grapnels to the bomb but became entangled in the bomb's parachute lines. The entangled bomb, parachute, and CURV-I were successfully raised together to the surface 81 days after the original incident.

=== 1973 Pisces III rescue ===
Pisces III, a Canadian commercial submersible, was used to lay transatlantic telephone cable on the sea bottom off Ireland in 1973. When a buoyancy tank was inadvertently flooded, it sank to the bottom of the ocean with its two-man crew, Britons Roger Mallinson and Roger Chapman, stranded at a depth of 1,575 feet (480 m) and 72 hours of available life support, which they were able to extend to 76 hours by careful conservation. Initial rescue efforts by Pisces III sister submersibles were unsuccessful. Through an international effort of the United States, Canada, and England, CURV-III was deployed within 24 hours 6,000 miles from its home base. Deployment of CURV-III from CCGS John Cabot was hampered by heavy sea conditions. Rapid repairs were made when CURV-III's gyroscope failed and electronics shorted-out after green water came aboard the Cabot. Assisted by the submersibles Pisces II and Pisces V, CURV-III was able to attach lines to the Pisces III's hatch. The Cabot raised CURV-III at 60 to 100 feet (18 to 30 m) per minute until their lines entangled. The lines were cut, CURV-III was abandoned, and Pisces III was floated to 60 feet (18 m) where scuba divers were able to attach lines that were used to lift Pisces III the rest of the way to the surface. CURV-III performed the deepest underwater rescue in history when Pisces III's two-man crew was rescued after 76 hours with just minutes of air remaining.

=== 1976 SS Edmund Fitzgerald survey ===
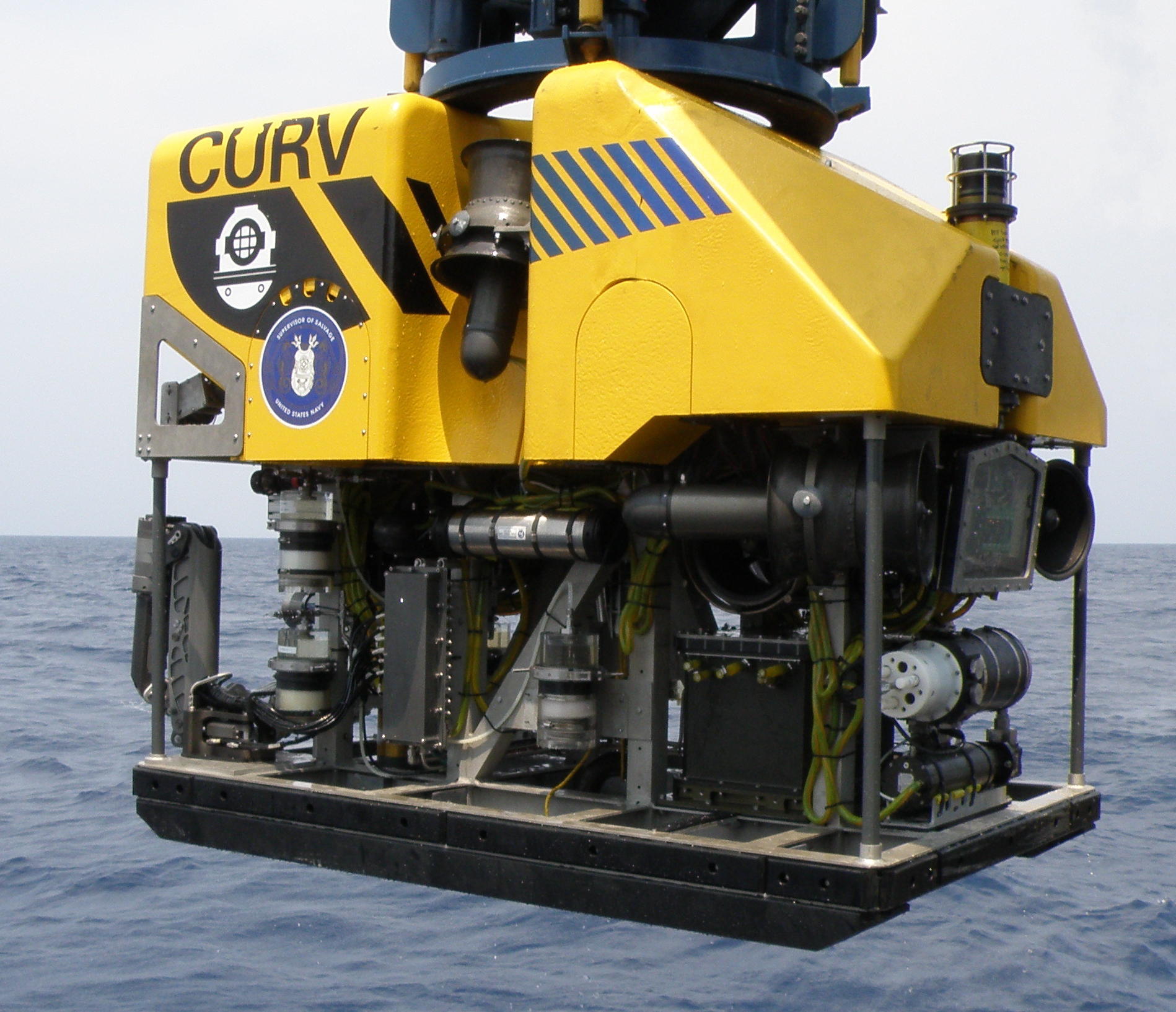
CURV-21, used to search for the OceanGate submersible Titan

CURV-III became known in the Great Lakes region in 1976 when it was used to survey the wreck of the SS Edmund Fitzgerald. Its mother ship was USCGC Woodrush and logistics support was provided by USCG Point Steel. CURV-III logged twelve dives in 500 feet (150 m) of water with more than 56 hours of bottom time. The dives produced 43,000 feet of videotape and 895 still photographs. The CURV-III underwater survey confirmed that the Fitzgerald was well beyond normal commercial salvage. Observers of the survey concluded that there was more damage to the Fitzgerald than expected but were unable to determine the cause of its foundering. Although operators of CURV-III were fully prepared to recover bodies during the survey, they did not locate any of the 29-man crew. An independent researcher was contracted to review the survey results and produce the sketches of the wreck used in the United States Coast Guard and National Transportation Safety Board investigation reports.

=== 2023 Missing submersible incident ===
CURV-21, which can reach 20,000 feet below the surface of water was being used to search for OceanGate submersible named Titan.
