= Continuous transmission mode =

Telecommunications signal mode

Continuous transmission mode is a telecommunications mode where a good part of the communication transmission links are of the continuous-mode type, in which the signal is present at all times.

In more quantitative terms, continuous transmission mode takes place:

- at constant bit rate,
- when the communication channel is active for times much longer than both:
  - the time needed to set up the channel itself, and/or
  - the time needed to transmit any file or record or any other sequence of information bearing bits.

== See also ==
- Burst transmission
