= Lift-on/lift-off =

Type of cargo ship

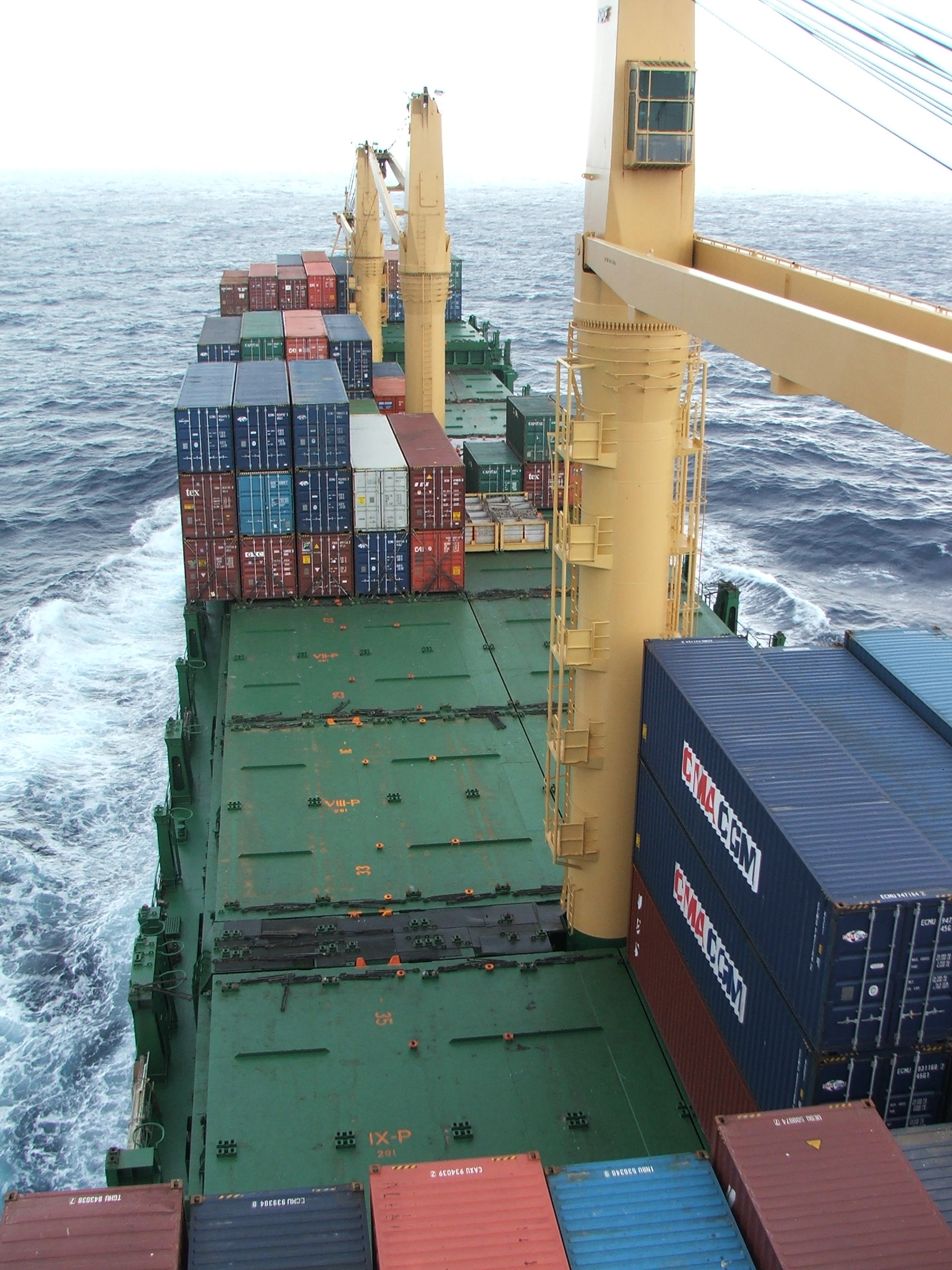
Cranes on a LoLo vessel

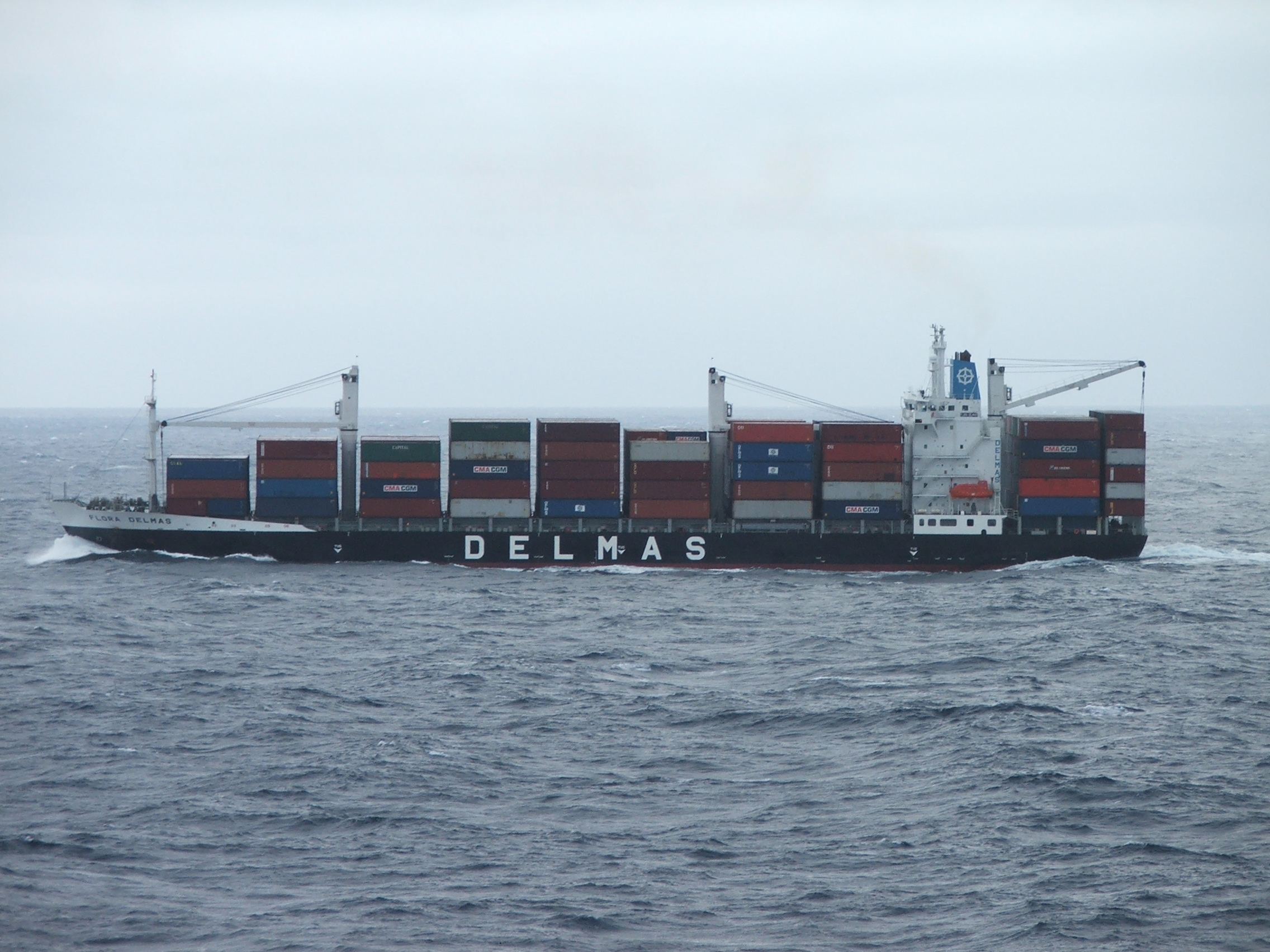
Flora Delmas, a LoLo vessel

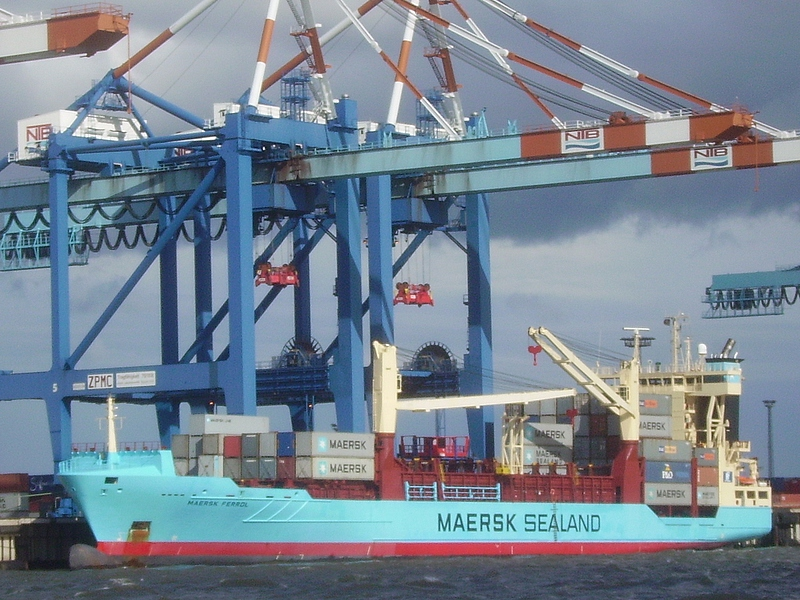
Container with a crane on it

Lift-on/lift-off (LoLo, sometimes LOLO, LO/LO or Lo/Lo) ships are cargo ships with on-board cranes to load and unload cargo. Ships with cranes or other cargo handling equipment on-board are also termed geared vessels.

As container ships usually have no on-board cranes or other mechanism to load or unload their cargo, they are therefore dependent on dockside container cranes to load and unload. However lift-on/lift-off vessels can load and unload their own cargo unassisted. Lift-on/lift-off vessels can operate out of docks with no dockside cargo handling equipment.

"In May 2010 the Office of Naval Research (ONR) conducted a ... at-sea demonstration of their Large Vessel Interface Lift-on/Lift-off (LVI Lo/Lo) crane system in sea state 3 conditions. The LVI Lo/Lo demonstrator is an advanced motion-compensated, at-sea cargo transfer system. The embedded technologies combine to provide tagline free six degrees-of-freedom control of the payload."
