= Merchant ship =

Civilian boat or ship that transports cargo or carries passengers for hire

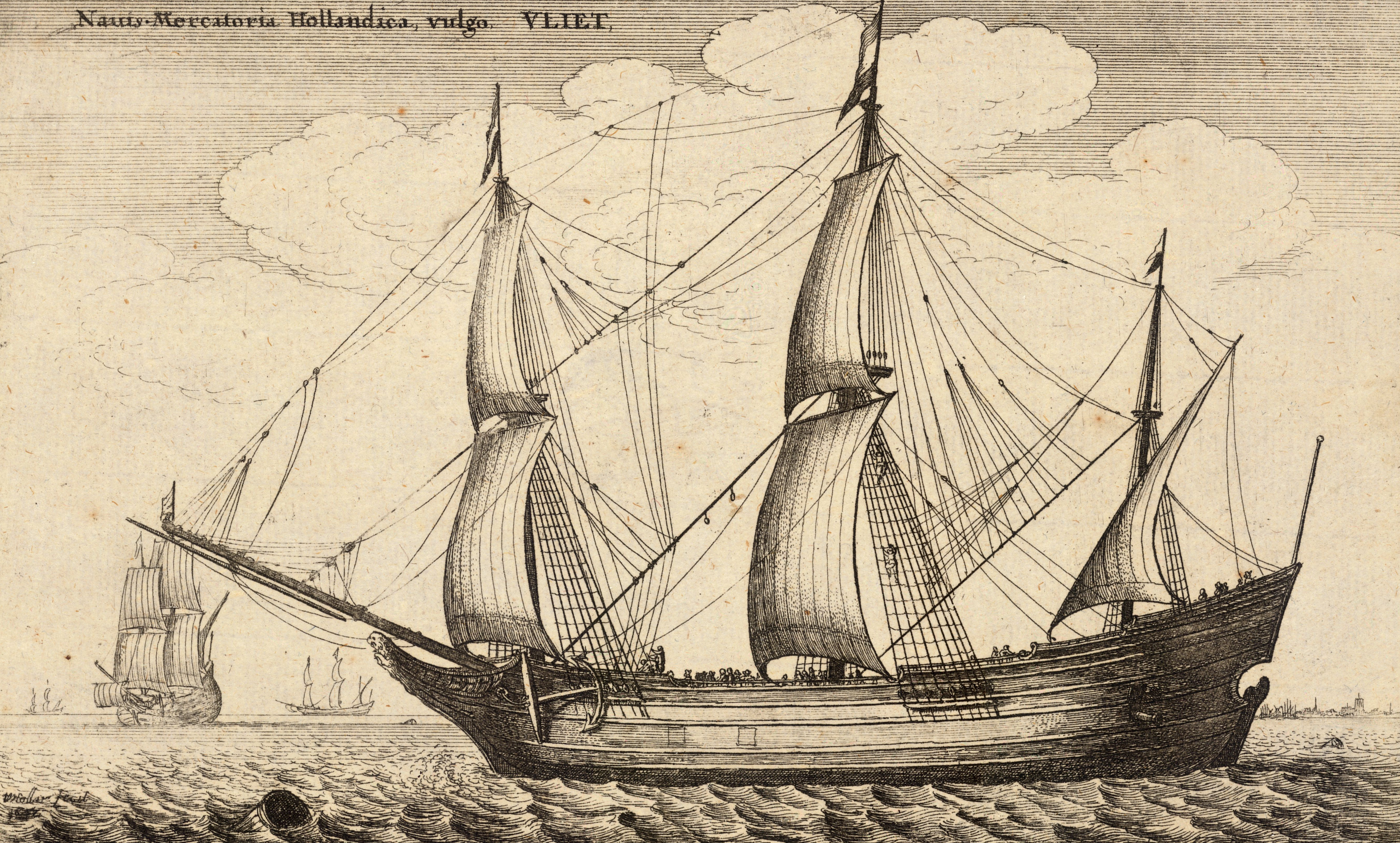
A 17th-century Dutch merchant ship

A merchant ship, merchant vessel, trading vessel, or merchantman is a watercraft that transports cargo or carries passengers for hire. This is in contrast to pleasure craft, which are used for personal recreation, and naval ships, which are used for military purposes. They come in myriad sizes and shapes, from six-metre (20 ft) inflatable dive boats in Hawaii, to 5,000-passenger and more casino vessels on the Mississippi River, to tugboats plying New York Harbor, to 300-metre (1,000 ft) oil tankers and container ships at major ports, to passenger-carrying submarines in the Caribbean.

Many merchant ships operate under a "flag of convenience" from a country other than the home of the vessel's owners, such as Liberia and Panama, which have more favorable maritime laws than other countries. The Greek merchant marine is the largest in the world. Today, the Greek fleet accounts for some 16 per cent of the world's tonnage; this makes it currently the largest single international merchant fleet in the world, albeit not the largest in history. During wars, merchant ships may be used as auxiliaries to the navies of their respective countries, and are called upon to deliver military personnel and materiel.

== Definitions ==
The term "commercial vessel" is defined by the United States Coast Guard as any vessel (i.e. boat or ship) engaged in commercial trade or that carries passengers for hire.

In English, the term "Merchant Navy" without further clarification is used to refer to the British Merchant Navy; the United States merchant fleet is known as the United States Merchant Marine.

== Name prefixes ==
Merchant ships' names have a prefix to indicate which kind of vessel they are:

- CS = Cable Ship/Cable layer
- LNG = Gas carrier transporting liquefied natural gas
- LPG = Gas carrier transporting liquefied petroleum gas
- MFV = Motor Fishing Vessel
- MS = Motorship
- MSV = Motor Stand-by Vessel
- MT = Motor Tanker or Motor Tug Boat
- MV = Motor/Merchant Vessel
- MY = Motor Yacht
- NS = Nuclear Ship
- RMS = Royal Mail Ship
- RRS = Royal Research Ship
- RV = Research Vessel
- SS = Steam Ship
- SV = Sailing Vessel (although these can be sub coded as type of sailing vessel)

== Merchant ship categories ==
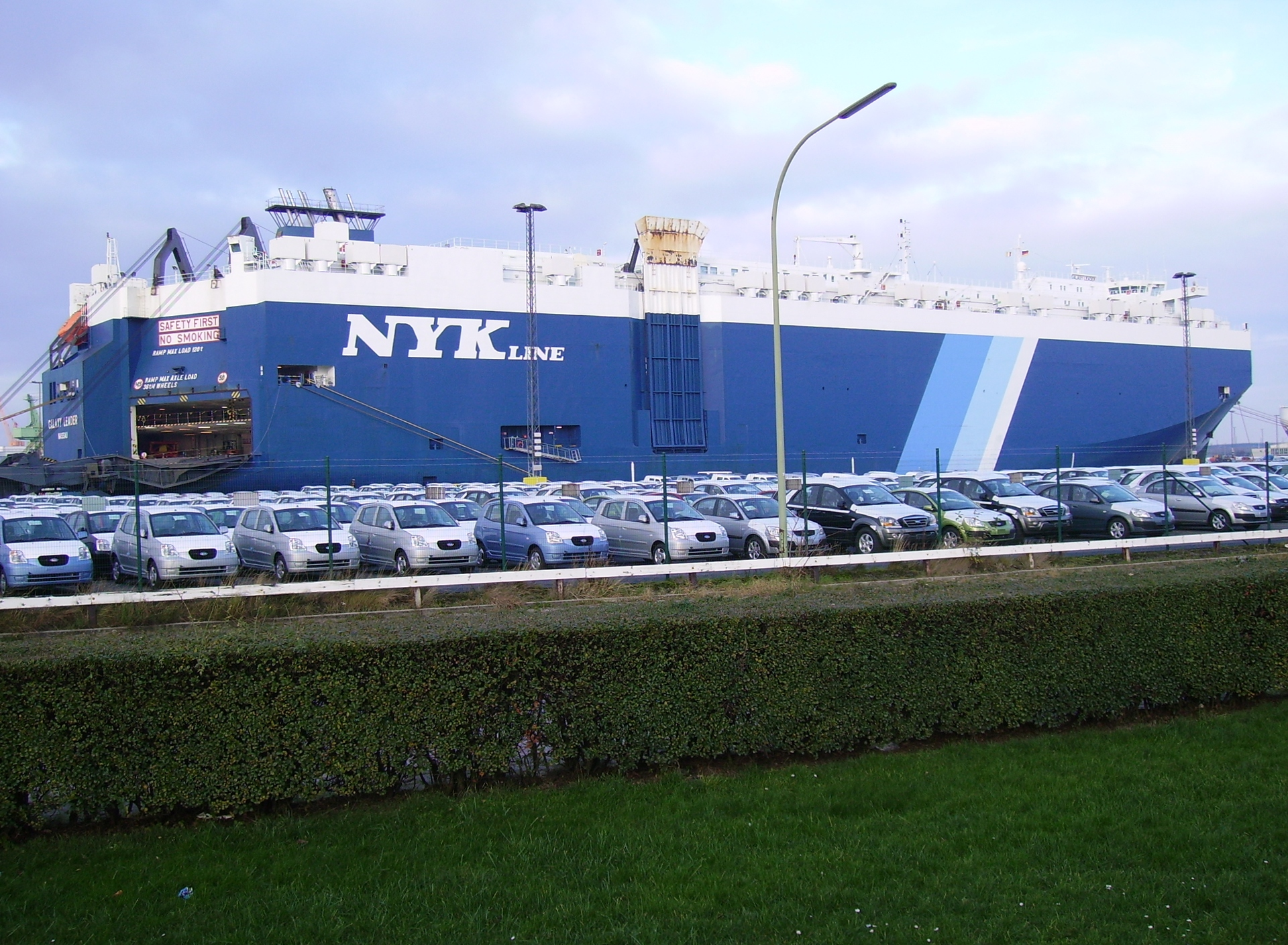
Roll-on/roll-off vessel Galaxy Leader

The UNCTAD review of maritime transport categorizes ships as: oil tankers, bulk (and combination) carriers, general cargo ships, container ships, and "other ships", which includes "liquefied petroleum gas carriers, liquefied natural gas carriers, parcel (chemical) tankers, specialized tankers, reefers, offshore supply, tugs, dredgers, cruise, ferries, other non-cargo". General cargo ships include "multi-purpose and project vessels and Roll-on/roll-off cargo".

=== Cargo ship ===
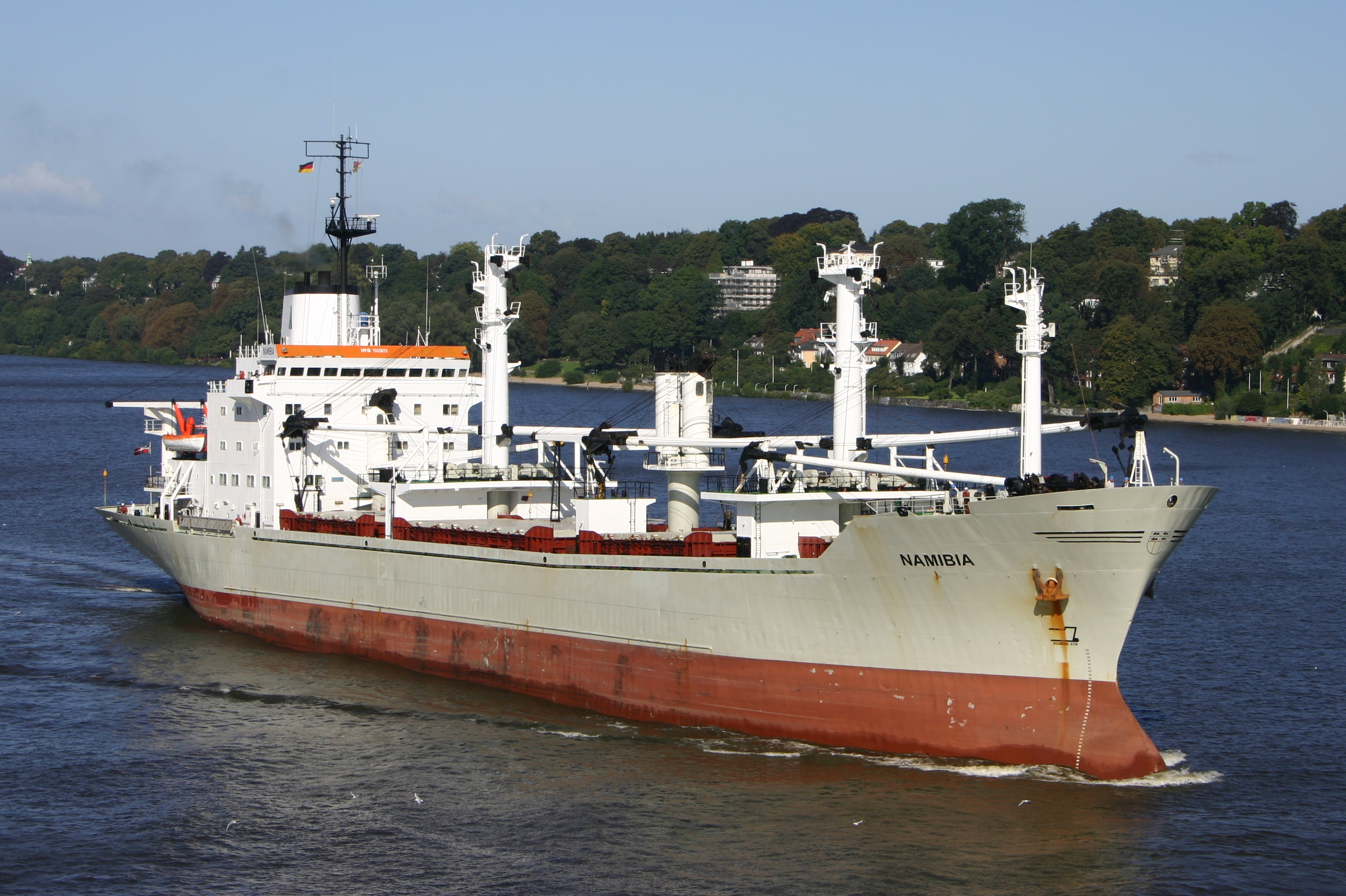
General cargo vessel Namibia

A cargo ship or freighter is any sort of ship or vessel that carries cargo, goods, and materials from one port to another. Thousands of cargo carriers ply the world's seas and oceans each year; they handle the bulk of international trade. Cargo ships are usually specially designed for the task, often being equipped with cranes and other mechanisms to load and unload, and come in all sizes.

==== Bulk carrier ====
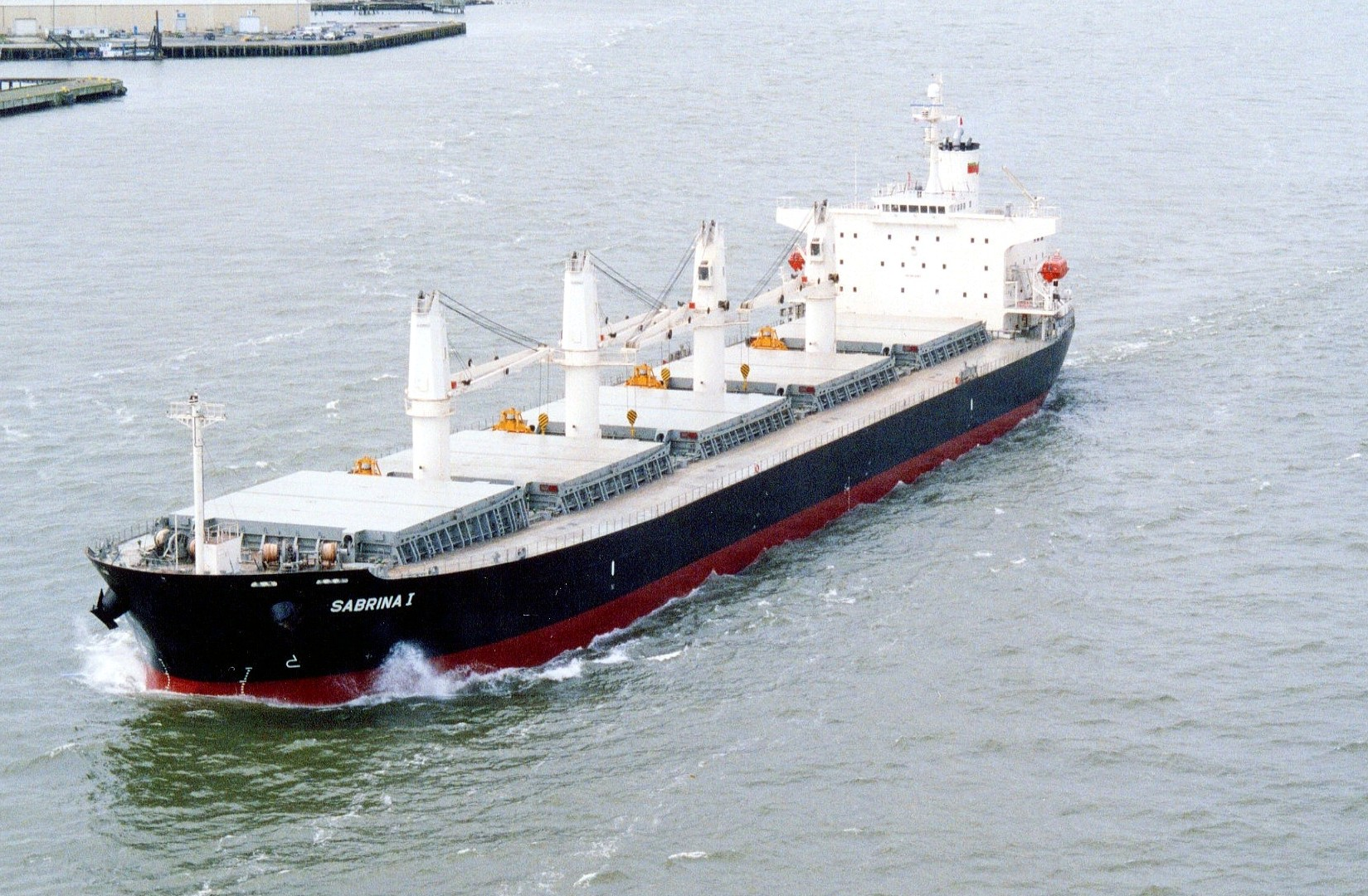
Bulk carrier Sabrina I

A bulk carrier is a ship used to transport bulk cargo items such as iron ore, bauxite, coal, cement, grain and similar cargo. Bulk carriers can be recognized by large box-like hatches on deck, designed to slide outboard or fold fore-and-aft to enable access for loading or discharging cargo. The dimensions of bulk carriers are often determined by the ports and sea routes that they need to serve, and by the maximum width of the Panama Canal. Most lakes are too small to accommodate bulk carriers, but a large fleet of lake freighters has been plying the Great Lakes and St. Lawrence Seaway of North America for over a century.

==== Container ship ====
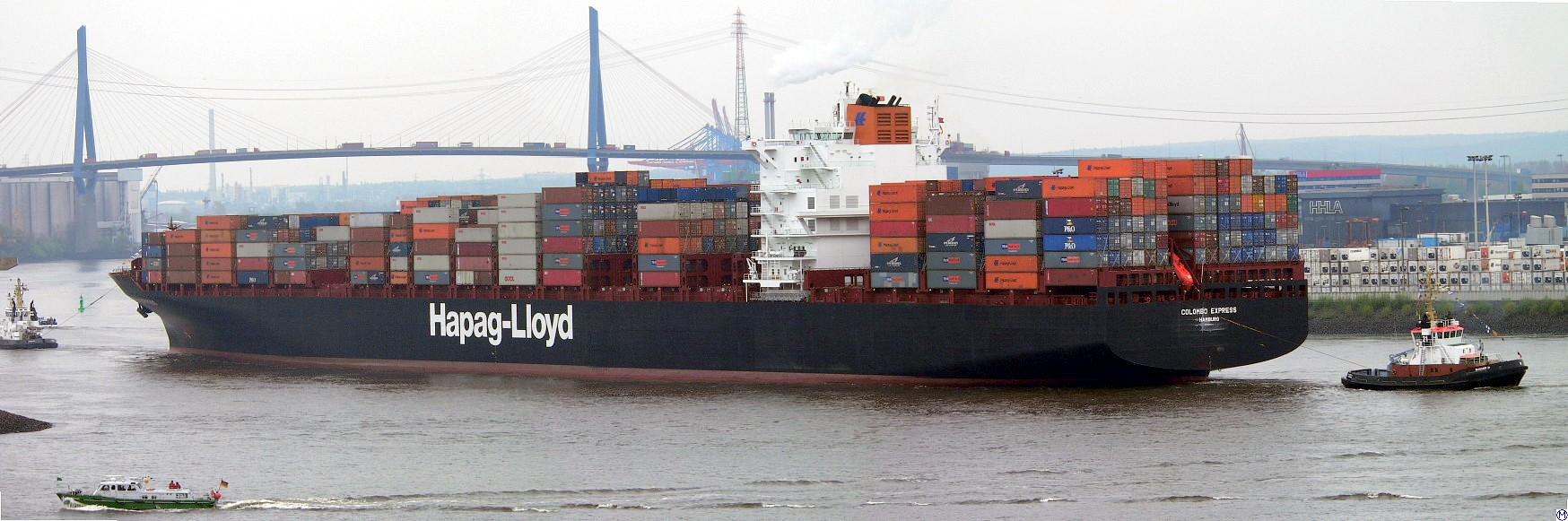
Container ship MV Colombo Express built in 2005

A container ship (also called boxship or spelled containership) is a cargo ship that carries all of its load in truck-size intermodal containers, in a technique called containerization. Container ships are a common means of commercial intermodal freight transport and now carry most seagoing non-bulk cargo.

Container ship capacity is measured in twenty-foot equivalent units (TEU). Typical loads are a mix of 20-foot (1-TEU) and 40-foot (2-TEU) ISO-standard containers, with the latter predominant.

Today, about 90% of non-bulk cargo worldwide is transported by container ships, the largest of which, from 2023 onward, can carry over 24,000 TEU.

==== Tanker ====
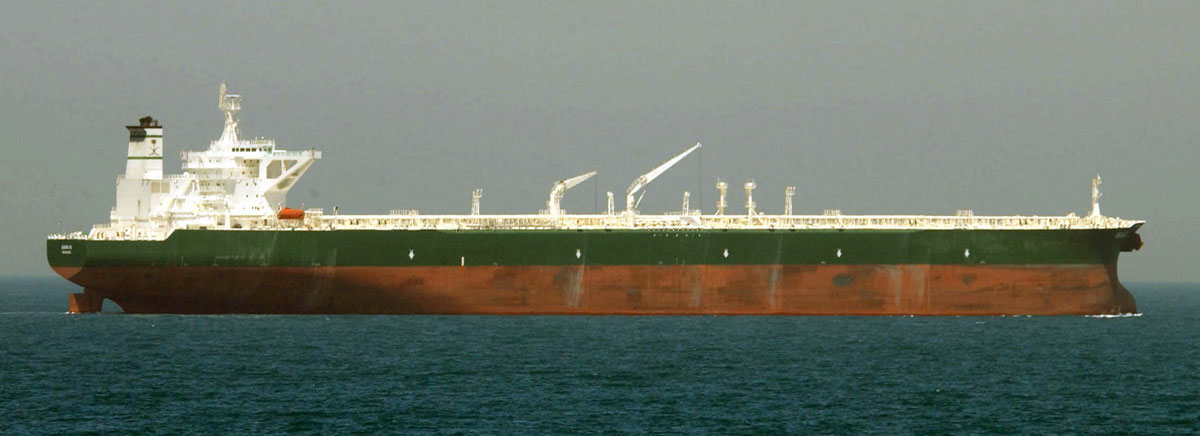
Crude oil supertanker AbQaiq

A tanker is a ship designed to transport liquids in bulk. Tankers can range in size from several hundred tons, designed to serve small harbours and coastal settlements, to several hundred thousand tons, with these being designed for long-range haulage. A wide range of products are carried by tankers, including:

- hydrocarbon products such as oil, LPG, and LNG
- chemicals, such as ammonia, chlorine, and styrene monomer
- fresh water
- wine

Different products require different handling and transport, thus special types of tankers have been built, such as chemical tankers, oil tankers, and gas carriers.

Among oil tankers, supertankers were designed for carrying oil around the Horn of Africa from the Middle East; the FSO Knock Nevis being the largest vessel in the world, a ULCC supertanker formerly known as Jahre Viking (Seawise Giant). It has a deadweight of 565,000 metric tons and length of about 458 meters (1,500 ft). The use of such large ships is in fact very unprofitable, due to the inability to operate them at full cargo capacity; hence, the production of supertankers has currently ceased. Today's largest oil tankers in comparison by gross tonnage are the TI-class supertankers TI Europe, TI Asia, TI Oceania, which are the largest sailing vessels today. But even with their deadweight of 441,585 metric tons, sailing as VLCC most of the time, they do not use more than 70% of their total capacity.

Apart from pipeline transport, tankers are the only method for transporting large quantities of oil, although such tankers have caused large environmental disasters when sinking close to coastal regions, causing oil spills. See Braer, Erika, Exxon Valdez, Prestige and Torrey Canyon for examples of tankers that have been involved in oil spills.

==== Coastal trading vessel ====
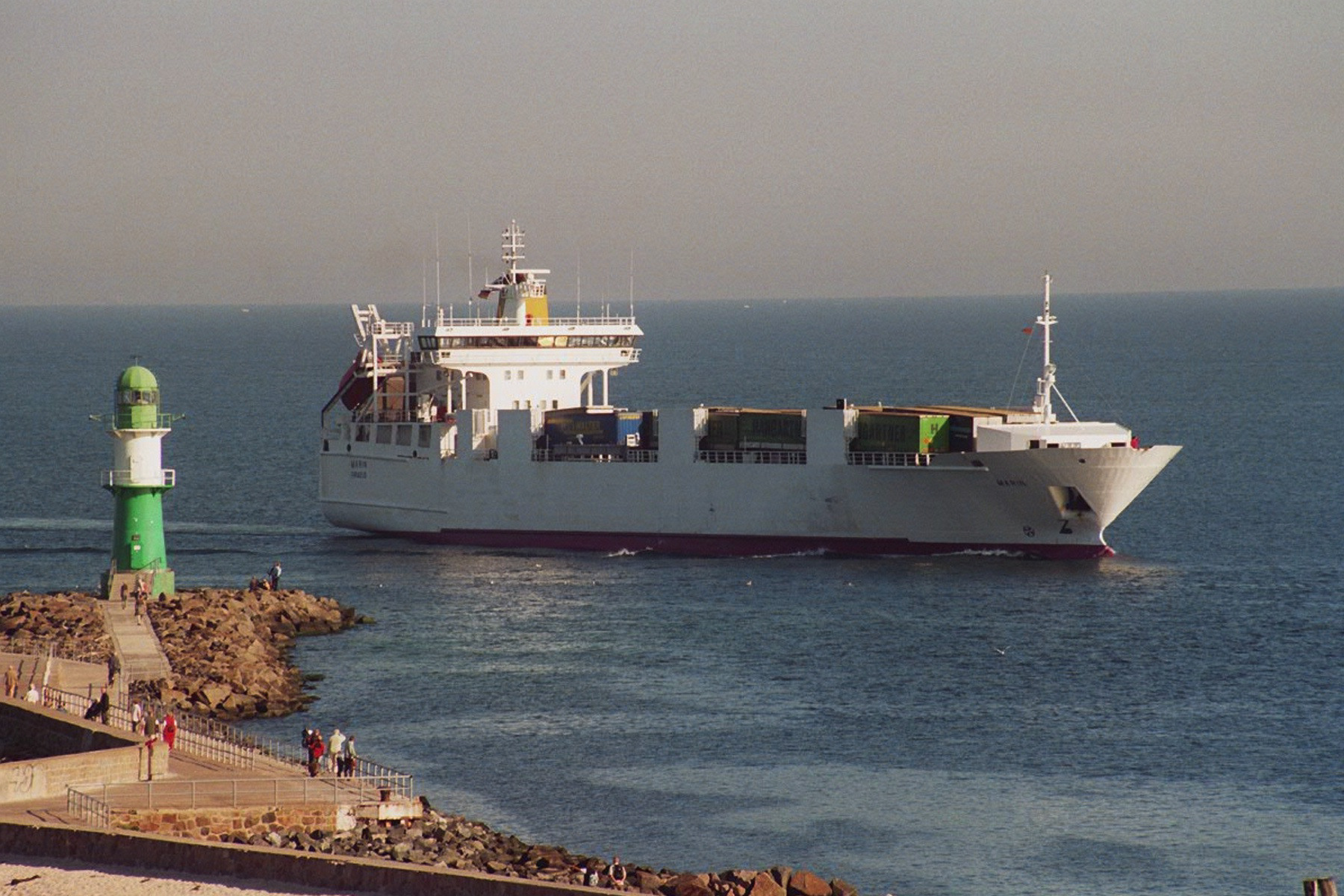
Coastal merchant vessel

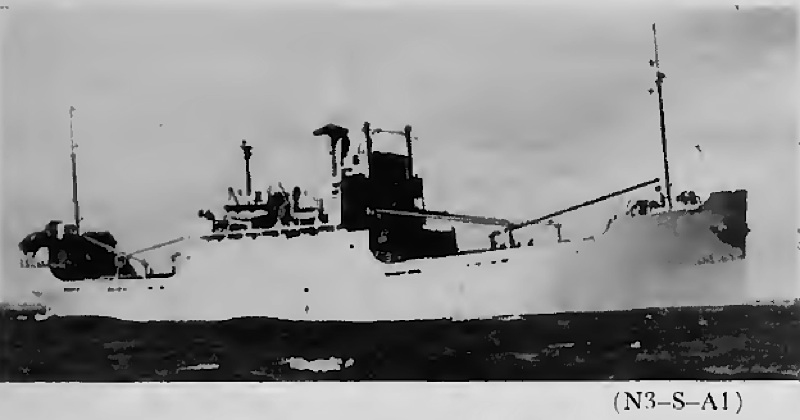
N3-S-A1 illustration from American World Traders-New Ships for the Merchant Marine, 1945

Coastal trading vessels, also known as coasters or skoots, are shallow-hulled merchant ships used for transporting cargo along a coastline. Their shallow hulls mean that they can get through reefs where deeper-hulled seagoing ships usually cannot (26–28 feet), but as a result they are not optimized for the large waves found on the open ocean. Coasters can load and unload cargo in shallow ports.

=== Passenger ship ===
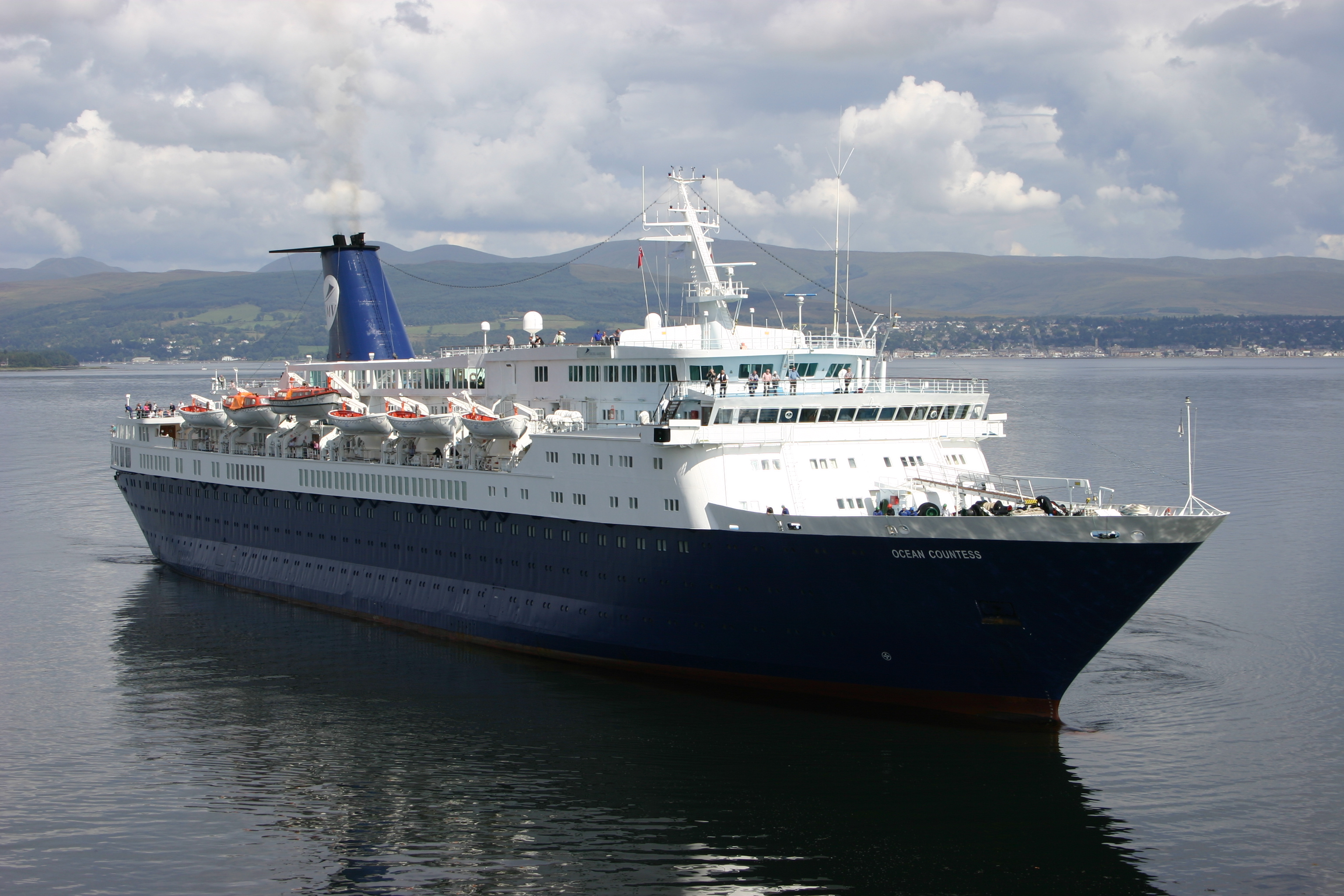
Cruise ship Ocean Countess

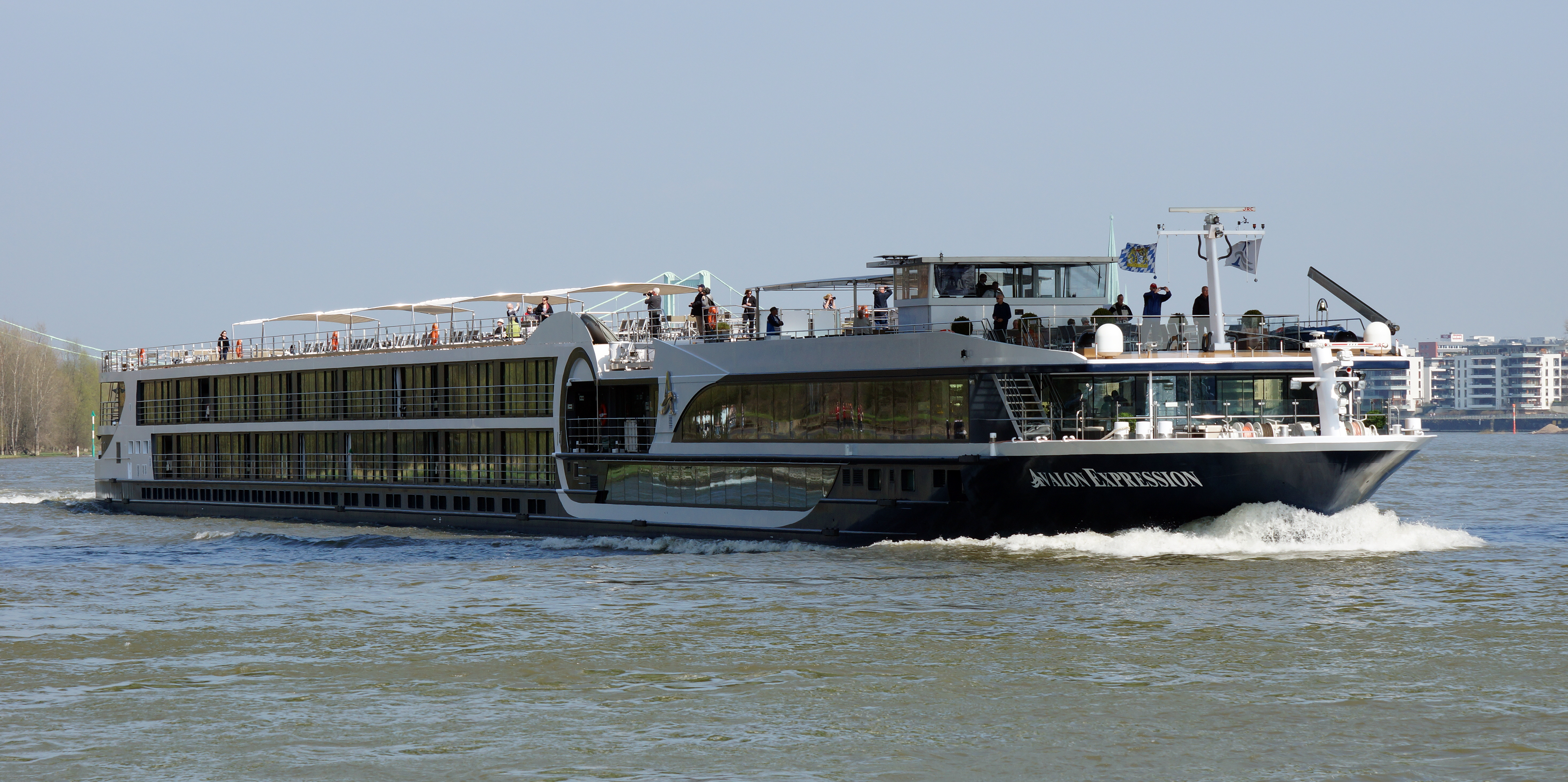
River cruise ship, Avalon Expression

A passenger ship is a ship whose primary function is to carry passengers. The category does not include cargo vessels which have accommodations for limited numbers of passengers, such as the formerly ubiquitous twelve-passenger freighters in which the transport of passengers is secondary to the carriage of freight. The type does however include many classes of ships which are designed to transport substantial numbers of passengers as well as freight. Indeed, until recently virtually all ocean liners were able to transport mail, package freight and express, and other cargo in addition to passenger luggage, and were equipped with cargo holds and derricks, kingposts, or other cargo-handling gear for that purpose. Modern cruiseferries have car decks for lorries as well as the passengers' cars. Only in more recent ocean liners and in virtually all cruise ships has this cargo capacity been removed. A ferry is a boat or ship carrying passengers and sometimes their vehicles. Ferries are also used to transport freight (in lorries and sometimes unpowered freight containers) and even railroad cars (in the case of a train ferry).

== See also ==
- American Bureau of Shipping
- American Waterways Operators
- Armed merchantman
- Boat
- Canal
- Ferry
- Freight transport
- Gas carrier
- Glossary of nautical terms (disambiguation)
- Great Lakes Waterway
- Lake freighter
- List of cargo types
- Marine fuel management
- Maritime transport
- Navigability
- Roll trailer
- Saint Lawrence Seaway
- Ship
- Ship prefix
- Train ferry
- Tramp trade
- Watercraft
- Waterway
- Whaleback
