= Freight transport =

Physical process of transporting commodities and merchandise goods and cargo

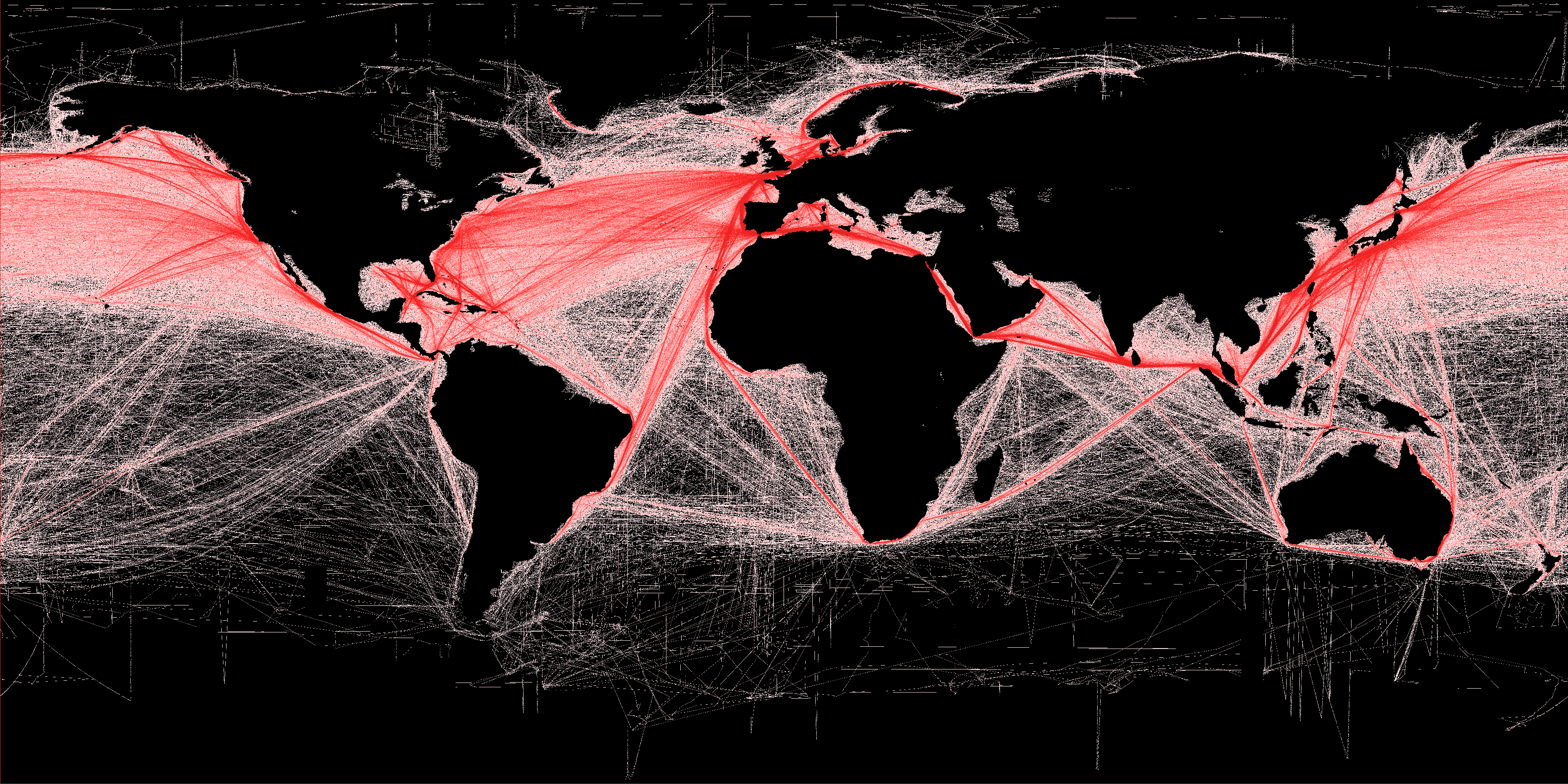
This map of shipping routes illustrates the relative density of commercial shipping in the world's oceans.

Freight transport, also referred to as freight forwarding, is the physical process of transporting commercial products and merchandise goods and cargo. This is by different transportation modes, including air, water, railways, pipelines, and road transports. Pipelines transport items that are liquid and gaseous in nature, while air, water, and roads are used to transport goods and passengers.

== History ==
=== Prehistoric era ===
Initial human civilization relied heavily on domesticated animals, such as horses, camels, and donkeys, to transport their goods. The invention of the wheel in Mesopotamia in 5000 B.C.E improved this efficiency by allowing for carts and carriages to be created, which animals could pull.

Water transport also developed, with a terra-cotta model of a boat from the Ubaid period, circa 4000 BCE, providing some of the earliest evidence for sailboats.

=== Classical era ===
==== Romans ====
The Romans built a vast network of roads, which facilitated trade across the numerous cities in its empire.

==== Silk Road ====
Transport along the silk road, a land-based route, was generally done through caravans, equipped with camels that would carry goods. It was uncommon for traders to traverse the entirety of the silk road — they would pass on their goods to other traders along different legs of the journey.

While silk flowed westward from China, other goods such as wools, gold, and silver were transported east from the West.

=== Modern period ===
==== Industrial Revolution ====
Freight transport in the UK was shaped significantly by the Industrial Revolution. A sophisticated canal system in the English Midlands allowed freight to be transported easily over long distances. Additionally, railway systems were popularized; they initially consisted of horse-drawn carts, but switched to steam-powered trains later on.

==== Aviation ====
After the invention of the plane by the Wright Brothers, the first air freight shipment was delivered in 1910. While the industry and demand for air freight delivery remained low throughout much of the 20th century, the creation of FedEx in 1973 revolutionised the industry by introducing specialised cargo flights, rather than aggregating passenger and cargo flights in one trip.

==== Autonomous transportation ====
Autonomous vehicles have been tested by companies for freight transportation, with potential benefits including reduced labour costs and changes in transport operations. Autonomous delivery robots have also been studied as a way to automate the last mile of the delivery process. A 2024 literature review examined research on these robots, including their potential applications and challenges in last-mile logistics.

== Modes of shipment ==
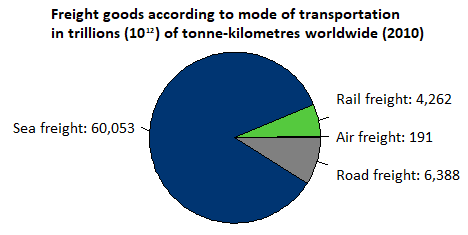
Global freight volumes according to mode of transport in trillions of tonne-kilometres in 2010

In 2015, 108 trillion tonne-kilometers were transported worldwide (anticipated to grow by 3.4% per year until 2050 (128 trillion in 2020)): 70% by sea, 18% by road, 9% by rail, 2% by inland waterways and less than 0.25% by air.

=== Grounds ===
Land or "ground" shipping can be made by train or by truck (British English: lorry). Ground transport is typically more affordable than air, but more expensive than sea, especially in developing countries, where inland infrastructure may not be efficient. In air and sea shipments, ground transport is required to take the cargo from its place of origin to the airport or seaport and then to its destination because it is not always possible to establish a production facility near ports due to the limited coastlines of countries.

=== Ship ===
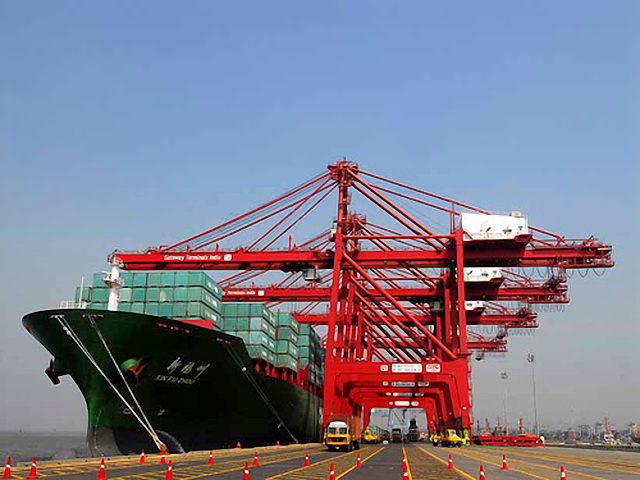
Harbour cranes unload cargo from a container ship at the Jawaharlal Nehru Port, Navi Mumbai, India.

Much freight transport is done by cargo ships. An individual nation's fleet and the people that crew it are referred to as its merchant navy or merchant marine. According to a 2018 report from the United Nations Conference on Trade and Development (UNCTAD), merchant shipping (or seaborne trade) carries 80–90% of international trade and 60–70% by value. On rivers and canals, barges are often used to carry bulk cargo.

=== Air ===
Cargo is commonly transported by air in specialized cargo aircraft and in the luggage compartments of passenger aircraft, while sometimes helicopters and drones become the alternative air transportations. Air freight is typically the fastest mode for long-distance freight transport, but it is also the most expensive.

=== Multimodal ===
Multimodal freight transportation (MFT) is the movement of merchandise through at least two distinct modes of transportation. The mode of transportation may be through a box, a container, a swap body, a road/rail vehicle, or a vessel. As such, the regular and express delivery system on a regional or national scale and long-distance pickup and delivery services are also examples of multimodal transportation. As of 2020, Europe has a relatively low percentage of MFT. As per European statistics, the market shares of inland freight transport by road, rail, and inland waterways in 2020 are 77.4, 16.8, and 5.8%, respectively. Taking the average across European nations from 2010 to 2020, rail market share reduced by approximately 1.2% vis-à-vis 2010, while water market share decreased by 1.6%.

=== Intermodal ===
Multimodal transport featuring containerized cargo (or intermodal container) that is easily transferred between ship, rail, plane and truck.

For example, a shipper works together with both ground and air transportation to ship an item overseas. Intermodal freight transport is used to plan the route and carry out the shipping service from the manufacturer to the door of the recipient.

== Terms of shipment ==
The Incoterms (or International Commercial Terms) published by the International Chamber of Commerce (ICC) are accepted by governments, legal authorities, and practitioners worldwide for the interpretation of the most commonly used terms in international trade. Common terms include:

- Free on Board (FOB)
- Cost and Freight (CFR, C&F, CNF)
- Cost, Insurance and Freight (CIF)

The term "best way" generally implies that the shipper will choose the carrier that offers the lowest rate (to the shipper) for the shipment. In some cases, however, other factors, such as better insurance or faster transit time, will cause the shipper to choose an option other than the lowest bidder.

== Door-to-door shipping ==
Door-to-door (DTD or D2D) shipping refers to the domestic or international shipment of cargo from the point of origin (POI) to the destination while generally remaining on the same piece of equipment and avoiding multiple transactions, trans-loading, and cross-docking without interim storage.

International DTD is a service provided by many international shipping companies and may feature intermodal freight transport using containerized cargo. The quoted price of this service includes all shipping, handling, import and customs duties, making it a hassle-free option for customers to import goods from one jurisdiction to another. This is compared to standard shipping, the price of which typically includes only the expenses incurred by the shipping company in transferring the object from one place to another. Customs fees, import taxes and other tariffs may contribute substantially to this base price before the item ever arrives.

== Digitalization and logistics marketplaces ==
The freight transport industry has witnessed a substantial change with the rise of integrated digital marketplaces. International freight transport is a traditionally fragmented industry; however, with the rise of global digital marketplaces, the industry is witnessing a move towards a centralized platform. Such a move is enabling the integration of maritime, air, and land freight into a single marketplace. This is enabling small and medium-sized enterprises (SMEs) to access international supply chains through Less than Container Load (LCL) and multimodal solutions traditionally adopted by industrial shippers.

== See also ==
- Affreightment
- Automatic identification system
- Mid-stream operation
- Outline of transport
- Ship transport
- Rail transport
- Transshipment
- Greek shipping
- Chinese shipping
- Environmental issues with shipping
- List of cargo types
- Right of way (shipping)
- Shipping markets
- Full container load (FCL)
- Less than container load (LCL)

== Citations ==
- "Review of Maritime Transport 2014" (PDF). United Nations Conference on Trade and Development. 2014. Archived from the original (PDF) on 2015-01-15.
- "Special Chapter: Asia". Review Maritime Transport 2010 Flyer. United Nations Conference on Trade and Development. 2010.
