= Freight interline system =

The freight interline system is a system of relations between trucking companies, rail, and airline networks. Interline freight is cargo that moves between different transportation companies on its journey from origin to consignee. An interline exchange is a contractual transfer of goods from one company to another.

== Types ==
A shipment may be prepaid or collect. If it is collect, then each carrier that ships the freight assumes responsibility for the cargo, adds its charges to the customer's bill, advances money to the previous carrier, transports the freight, and delivers it to the next carrier. The final carrier, the company that delivers the freight to its final destination, is responsible for collecting the money from the consignee before delivery.

A prepaid situation would be similar with the exception that each carrier would each take out its own portion of the freight rate as it handles the freight. Also, the final carrier would not have to collect any monies, but would still receive its own portion.

Each carrier is called an intermodal company in a sequence of carriers transporting a particular cargo. Often each company has discretion about when to interline the freight to another company. During an interline shipment there are intermediate entities assisting in the coordination of the transport, including customs brokers and logistics firms. Sometimes a freight forwarder will come between two carriers to act as an agent. Also, the freight will go through clearances and currency exchanges.

A long interline system might include many companies. For example, a small air carrier might assume responsibility for the freight from the customer, then transfer it to a rail company, which puts it on a truck to an international airport, where a major air carrier might fly the freight overseas. At another international airport the freight may be transferred to another rail company, which transports the cargo to a hub near the consignee. A trucking company then might collect the freight and deliver it directly to the consignee.

== See also ==
- Cargo sampling
