= List of cargo types =

== Primary maritime cargo types ==
Primary maritime cargo types
Cargo type	Countable	Packaging	Container	Remarks
Break bulk cargo or general cargo	Countable	Yes	No	Break bulk cargo or general cargo are goods that must be loaded individually, and not in intermodal containers nor in bulk as with oil or grain. Ships that carry this sort of cargo are called general cargo ships. The term break bulk derives from the phrase breaking bulk—the extraction of a portion of the cargo of a ship or the beginning of the unloading process from the ship's holds. These goods may not be in shipping containers. Break bulk cargo is transported in bags, boxes, crates, drums, or barrels. Unit loads of items secured to a pallet or skid are also used.
Bulk cargo (bulk dry cargo)	Weighable	No	No	Bulk cargo is commodity cargo that is transported unpackaged in large quantities. It refers to material in either liquid or granular, particulate form, as a mass of relatively small solids, such as petroleum/crude oil, grain, coal, or gravel. This cargo is usually dropped or poured, with a spout or shovel bucket, into a bulk carrier ship's hold, railroad car/railway wagon, or tanker truck/trailer/semi-trailer body. Smaller quantities (still considered "bulk") can be boxed (or drummed) and palletised. Bulk cargo is classified as liquid or dry.
Bulk liquid cargo	Weighable	No	No	A tanker (or tank ship or tankship) is a ship designed to transport or store liquids or gases in bulk. Major types of tankship include the oil tanker, the chemical tanker, and gas carrier. Tankers also carry commodities such as vegetable oils, molasses and wine. In the United States Navy and Military Sealift Command, a tanker used to refuel other ships is called an oiler (or replenishment oiler if it can also supply dry stores) but many other navies use the terms tanker and replenishment tanker. A wide range of products are carried by tankers, including: Hydrocarbon products such as oil, liquefied petroleum gas (LPG), and liquefied natural gas (LNG); Chemicals, such as ammonia, chlorine, and styrene monomer; Fresh water; Wine; Molasses; Citrus juice
Container cargo	Countable	Yes	Yes	Containerization is a system of intermodal freight transport using intermodal containers (also called shipping containers and ISO containers). The containers have standardized dimensions. They can be loaded and unloaded, stacked, transported efficiently over long distances, and transferred from one mode of transport to another—container ships, rail transport flatcars, and semi-trailer trucks—without being opened. The handling system is completely mechanized so that all handling is done with cranes and special forklift trucks. All containers are numbered and tracked using computerized systems.
Neo-bulk cargo	Weighable	Yes	No	In the ocean shipping trade, neo-bulk cargo is a type of cargo that is a subcategory of general cargo, alongside the other subcategories of break-bulk cargo and containerized cargo. (Gerhardt Muller, erstwhile professor at the United States Merchant Marine Academy and Manager of Regional Intermodal Planning of the Port Authority of New York and New Jersey, promotes it from a subcategory to being a third major category of cargo in its own right, alongside general and bulk cargo.) It comprises goods that are prepackaged, counted as they are loaded and unloaded (as opposed to bulk cargo where individual items are not counted), not stored in containers, and transferred as units at port. Types of neo-bulk cargo goods include heavy machinery, lumber, bundled steel, scrap iron, bananas, waste paper, and cars. The category has only become recognized as a distinct cargo category in its own right in recent decades.
Passenger cargo	Countable	No	No	A passenger ship is a merchant ship whose primary function is to carry passengers on the sea.
Project cargo	Weighable	Yes	No	Project cargo is a term used to broadly describe the national or international transportation of large, heavy, high value, or critical (to the project they are intended for) pieces of equipment. Also commonly referred to as heavy lift, this includes shipments made of various components which need disassembly for shipment and reassembly after delivery.
Refrigerated cargo	Weighable	Yes	Yes/no	A reefer ship is a refrigerated cargo ship, typically used to transport perishable commodities which require temperature-controlled transportation, such as fruit, meat, fish, vegetables, dairy products and other foods.
Roll-on/roll-off cargo	Countable	No	No	Roll-on/roll-off (RORO or ro-ro) ships are vessels designed to carry wheeled cargo, such as cars, trucks, semi-trailer trucks, trailers, mafi roll trailers and railroad cars, that are driven on and off the ship on their own wheels or using a platform vehicle, such as a self-propelled modular transporter. This is in contrast to lift-on/lift-off (LOLO) vessels, which use a crane to load and unload cargo.
