= Neo-bulk cargo =

In the ocean shipping trade, neo-bulk cargo is a type of cargo that is a subcategory of general / break-bulk cargo, that exists alongside the other main categories of bulk cargo and containerized cargo. Gerhardt Muller, erstwhile professor at the United States Merchant Marine Academy and Manager of Regional Intermodal Planning of the Port Authority of New York and New Jersey, promotes it from a subcategory to being a third main category of cargo in its own right, alongside containerized and bulk cargo.

== Description ==
It comprises goods that are prepackaged, counted as they are loaded and unloaded (as opposed to bulk cargo where individual items are not counted), not stored in containers, and transferred as units at port. Types of neo-bulk cargo goods include heavy machinery, lumber, bundled steel / steel coils, large units of scrap metal, banana bunches, waste paper bundles, and motor vehicles. The category has only become recognized as a distinct cargo category in its own right in recent decades.

Ocean vessels that are designed to carry specific forms of neo-bulk cargo, such as dedicated Roll-on/roll-off car-carrying ships, are called neo-bulk carriers. They are specially designed for the individual types of neo-bulk cargoes that they carry, although car-carriers can sometimes double-up to carry different types of cargo on a return journey. In 2000, the largest neo-bulk car carrier company in the world was Wallenius Wilhelmsen, with a fleet of 20 carrier vessels, and a total haulage that year of 1.5 million vehicles. Other special designs of neo-bulk carriers include log-carriers that are designed to tip their load over the side of the vessel into the water, relying upon the fact that logs will float, or specialist carriers for newsprint or livestock.
