= Citrus pellets =

Animal feed produced from byproducts of citrus processing

Citrus pellets are an animal feed produced from byproducts of citrus processing.

== Use ==
Used for feedstuff, especially for dairy cattle, fattened beef cattle and sheep.

== Processing ==
They are produced from the peel, pulp and seeds of several species of citrus, dried, and processed with a binder (e.g., 1-3% of molasses, fat or colloidal clays), and extruded into pellets (typically 6 mm diameter; 2.5 cm max length).

== See also ==
- Compound feed
- Fodder
- Pellet mill
