= Bulk cargo =

Commodity cargo transported unpackaged in large quantities

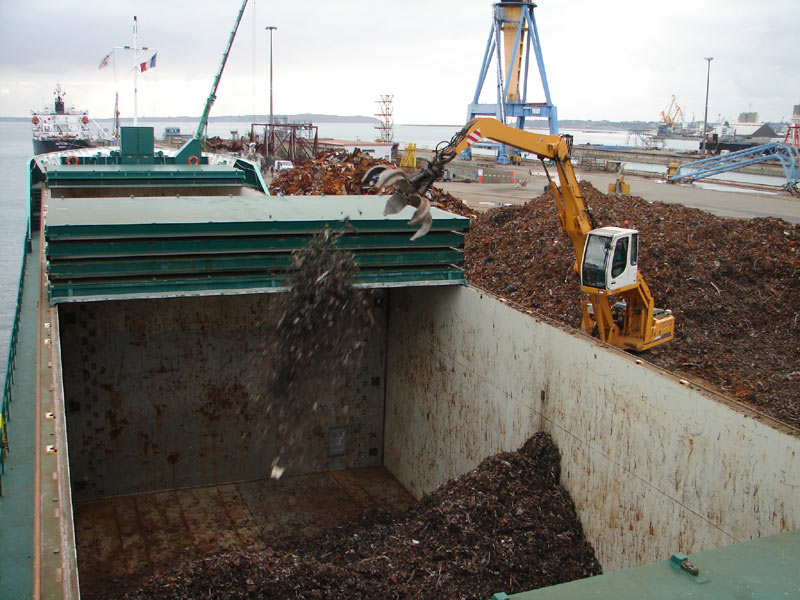
A mini-bulker taking on scrap iron cargo in Brest, France.

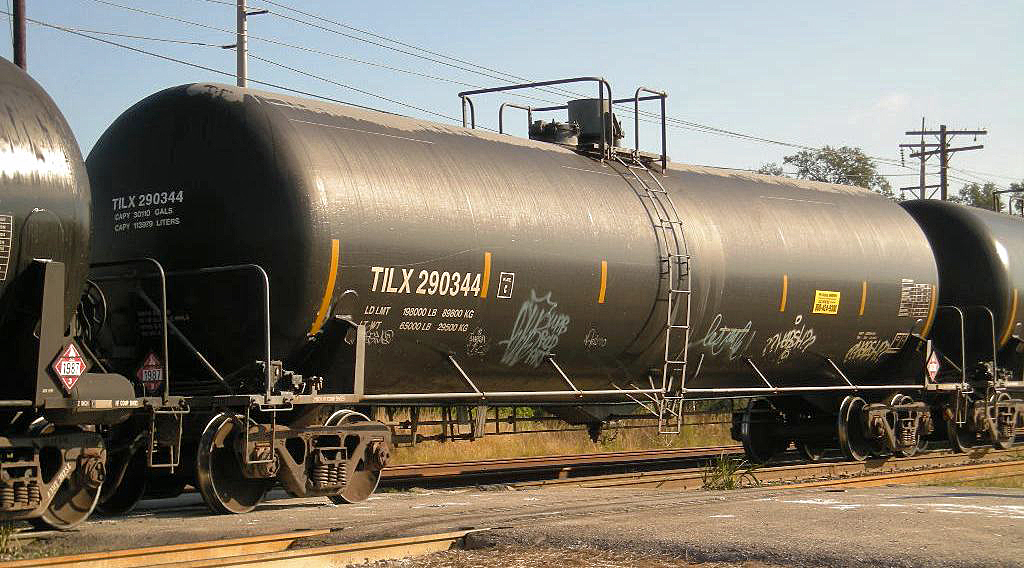
Modern tank cars carry all types of liquid and gaseous commodities.

Bulk cargo is product cargo that is transported unpackaged in large quantities.

== Description ==
Bulk cargo refers to material in either liquid or granular, particulate (as a mass of relatively small solids) form, such as petroleum/crude oil, grain, coal, or gravel. This cargo is usually dropped or poured, with a spout or shovel bucket, into a bulk carrier ship's hold, railroad car/railway wagon, or tanker truck/trailer/semi-trailer body. Smaller quantities can be boxed (or drummed) and palletised; cargo packaged in this manner is referred to as breakbulk cargo. Bulk cargo is classified as wet or dry.

The Baltic Exchange is based in London and provides a range of indices benchmarking the cost of moving bulk commodities, dry and wet, along popular routes around the seas. Some of these indices are also used to settle Freight Futures, known as FFA's. The most famous of the Baltic indices is the Baltic Dry Indices, commonly called the BDI. This is a derived function of the Baltic Capesize index (BCI), Baltic Panamax index (BPI), Baltic Supramax index (BSI) and the Baltic Handysize index (BHSI). The BDI has been used as a bellwether for the global economy as it can be interpreted as an indicator of an increase or decrease in the amount of raw commodities countries are importing/exporting.

== Dry ==
Dry bulk is any cargo carried in bulk in solid form. Such carriage is often referred to as the "dry" trades. They would include:

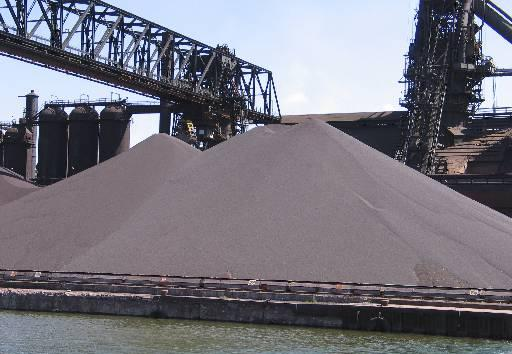
This heap of iron ore pellets will be used in steel production.

- Bauxite
- Bulk minerals (sand, gravel, copper, limestone, salt)
- Cements
- Chemicals (fertilizer, plastic granules and pellets, resin powder, synthetic fiber)
- Coals and cokes
- Agricultural products such as dry edibles (for animals or humans: alfalfa pellets, citrus pellets, livestock feed, flour, peanuts, raw or refined sugar, seeds or starches.)
- Grains (wheat, maize, rice, barley, oats, rye, sorghum, soybeans, etc.)
- Iron (ferrous and non-ferrous ores, ferroalloys, pig iron, scrap metal, pelletized taconite)
- Wood chips

== Wet ==
Liquid bulk cargo includes any cargo carried in closed tanks and poured or pumped into the carrying vessel, such as:

- Hazardous chemicals in liquid form
- Petroleum
- Gasoline
- Liquefied natural gas (LNG)
- Liquid nitrogen
- Cooking oil
- Fruit juices
- Rubber
- Vegetable oil

== Gallery ==
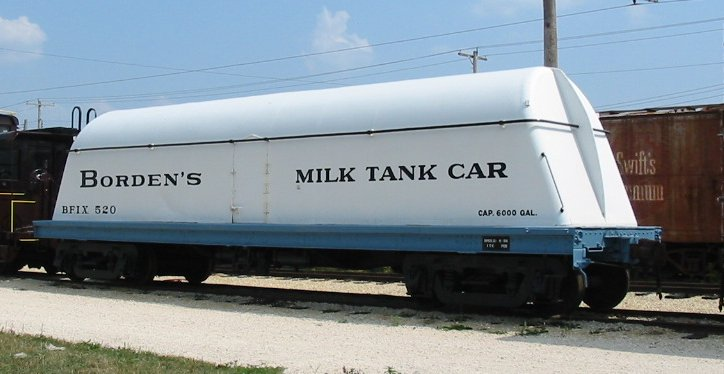
A milk tank car for bulk loading.

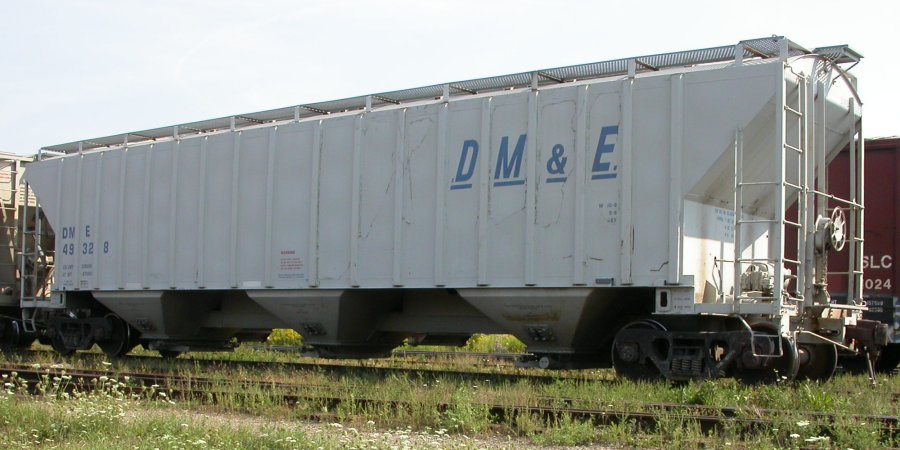
DME 49328, a covered hopper owned and operated by the Dakota, Minnesota and Eastern Railroad

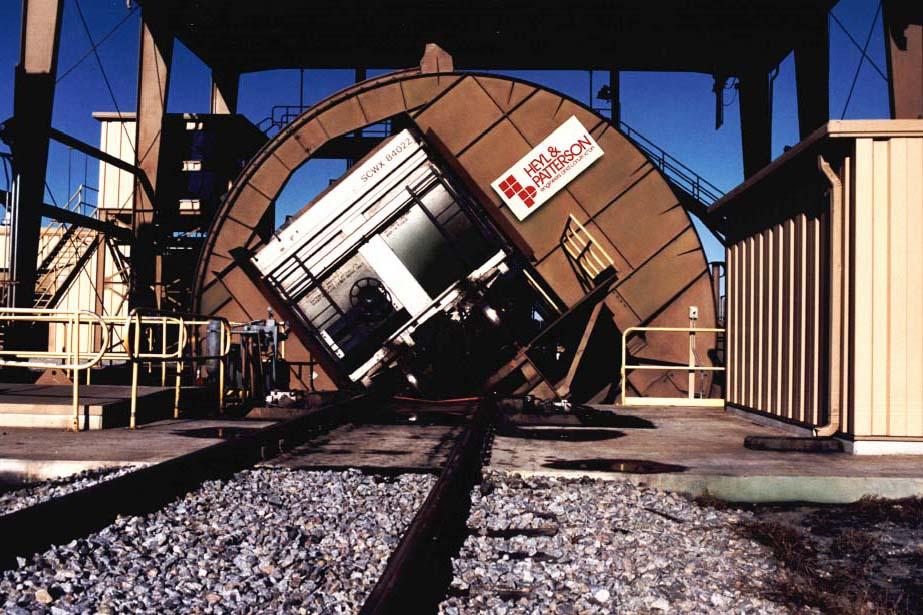
A rotary car dumper

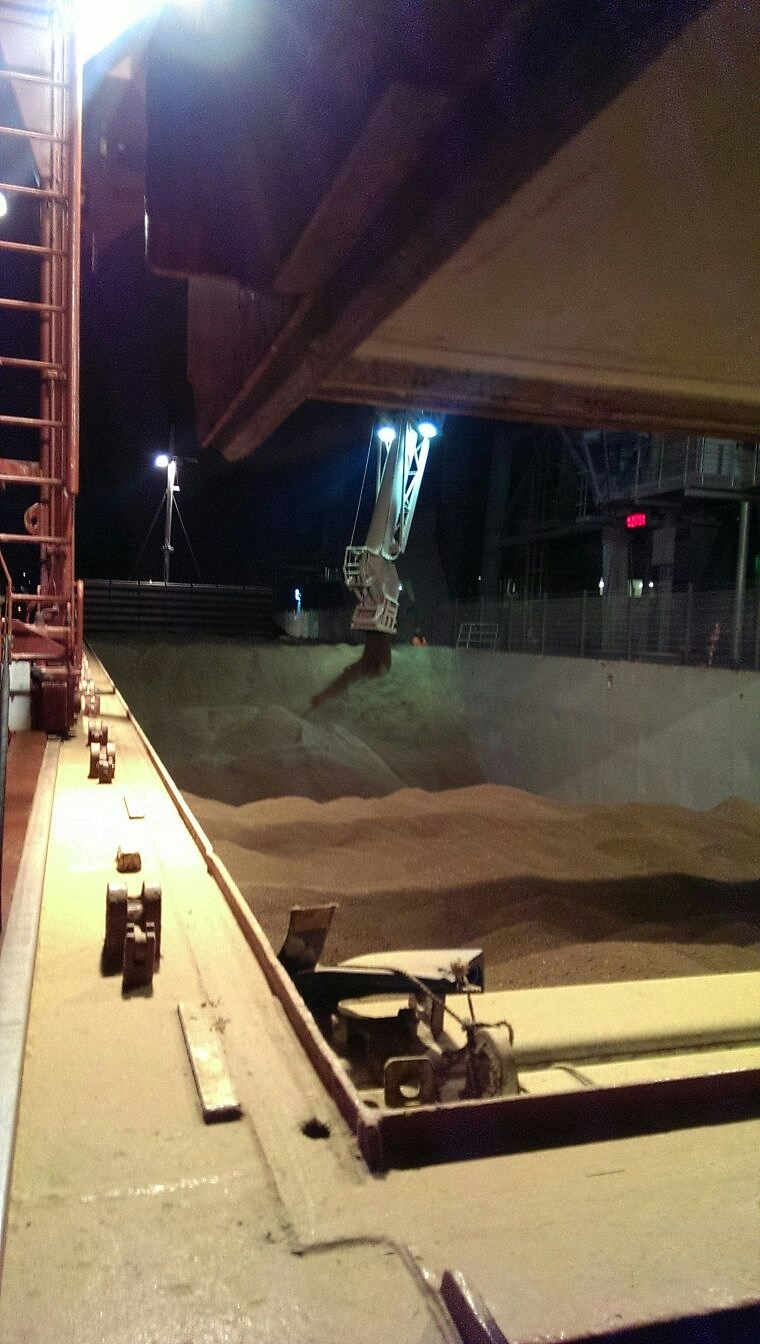
Bulk loading of a feeder ship with rapeseed meal

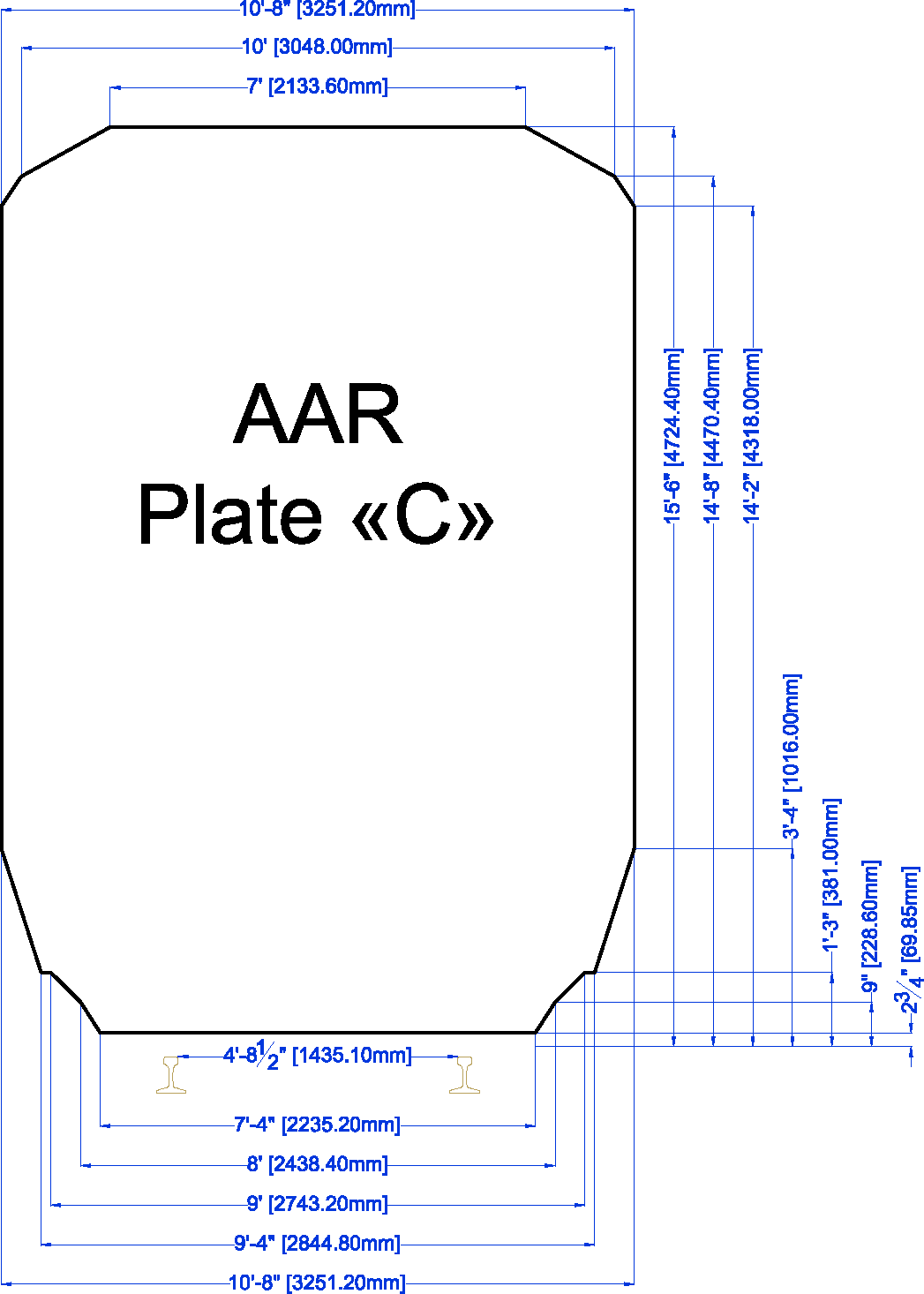

== Specialized large ports ==
- Port of Port Hedland, Australia
- Port of Rotterdam
- Port of Vancouver
- Port of Liverpool
- Port of Tyne
- Port of Amsterdam
- Port of Hamilton (Canada)

== See also ==
- Bulk material handling
- Covered hopper
- Flexible intermediate bulk container (bigbag)
- Harmonized System
- Hopper car
- Lake freighter
- Loading gauge
- Maritime transport
- Milk tank car
- Neo-bulk cargo
- Rotary car dumper
- Selfdischarger
- Tank car
- Tank truck
- World's busiest port

== Bibliography ==
- Bliault, Charles; Jonas, Martin; The North of England P&I Association (2016). Bulk Cargoes: A Guide to Good Practice (First ed.). UK: The North of England P&I Association. p. 280. ISBN 978-0-9574936-3-6. ASIN 0957493630.
- George, William (2005). Stability and Trim for the Ship's Officer. Centreville, MD: Cornell Maritime Press. ISBN 978-0-87033-564-8.
- Hayler, William B.; Keever, John M. (2003). American Merchant Seaman's Manual. Cornell Maritime Pr. ISBN 0-87033-549-9.
- United Nations Conference on Trade and Development (UNCTAD) (2006). Review of Maritime Transport, 2006 (PDF). New York and Geneva: United Nations. Archived from the original (PDF) on 2011-07-28.
- United Nations Conference on Trade and Development (UNCTAD) (2007). Review of Maritime Transport, 2007 (PDF). New York and Geneva: United Nations.
