= Cargo =

Goods or produce transported

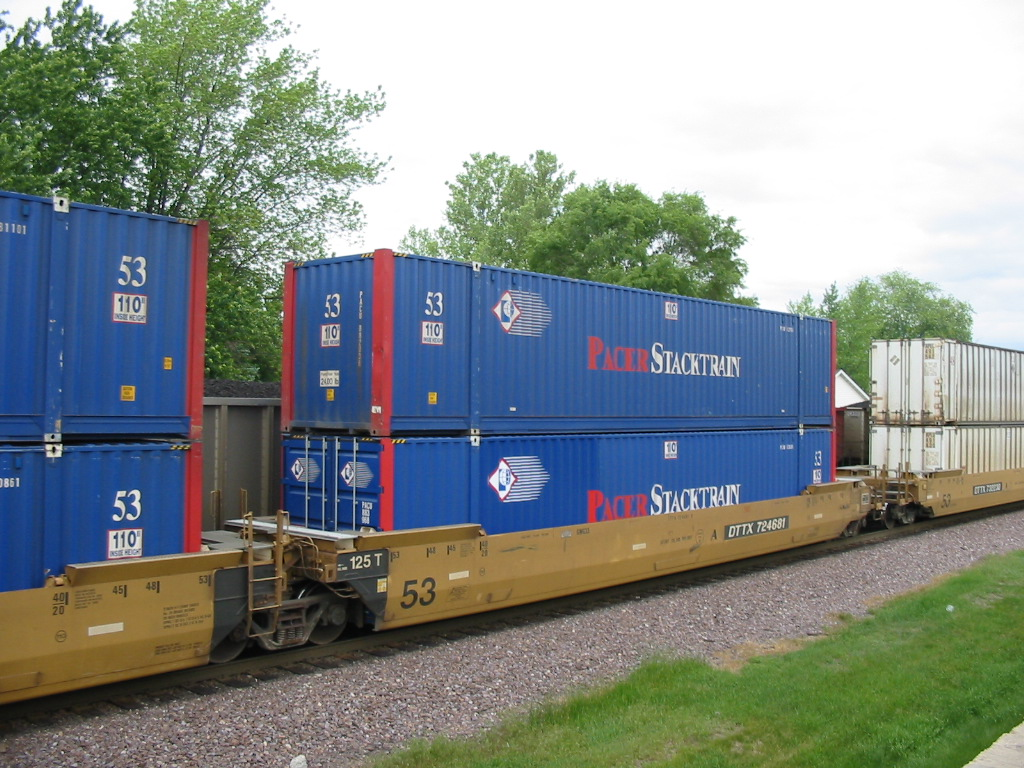
An articulated double-stack well car owned by the TTX Company. The 53 ft (16.15 m) capacity car is a Gunderson Maxi-IV.

In transportation, cargo refers to goods transported by land, water, or air, while freight refers to its conveyance. In economics, freight refers to goods transported at a freight rate for commercial gain. The term cargo is also used in the case of goods in the cold-chain, because the perishable inventory is always in transit towards a final end-use, even when it is held in cold storage or other similar climate-controlled facilities, including warehouses.

Multi-modal container units, designed as reusable carriers to facilitate unit load handling of the goods contained, are also referred to as cargo, especially by shipping lines and logistics operators. When empty containers are shipped each unit is documented as a cargo and when goods are stored within, the contents are termed containerized cargo. Similarly, aircraft ULD boxes are also documented as cargo, with an associated packing list of the items contained within.

== Description ==
=== Marine ===
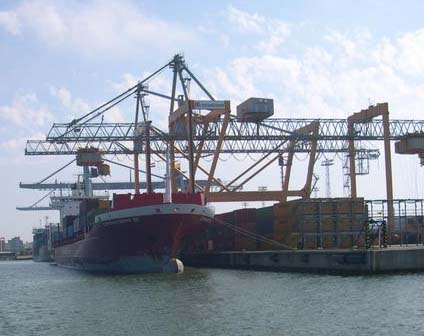
Container ship at the Port of Helsinki in Finland

Seaport terminals handle a wide range of maritime cargoes.

Break bulk / general cargo are goods that are handled and stowed piecemeal to some degree, as opposed to cargo in bulk or modern shipping containers. They are typically bundled in batches for hoisting, (with cargo nets, slings or crates), or stacked on trays, pallets or skids. They are generally lifted directly into and out of a vessel's holds, by cranes or derricks present on the dock or on the ship itself. If hoisted onto the deck instead of straight into the hold, cargo then is manhandled and stowed by stevedores. Securing break bulk and general freight inside a vessel includes the use of dunnage. When no hoisting equipment is available, break bulk would previously be man-carried on and off the ship, over a plank, or by passing via human chain. Since the 1960s, the volume of break bulk cargo has enormously declined worldwide in favour of mass adoption of containers. Bulk cargo, such as salt, oil, tallow, but also scrap metal, is usually defined as commodities that are neither on pallets nor in containers. Bulk cargoes are not handled as individual pieces, the way heavy-lift and project cargo are. Alumina, grain, gypsum, logs, and wood chips, for instance, are bulk cargoes. Bulk cargo is classified as liquid or dry.

=== Air ===
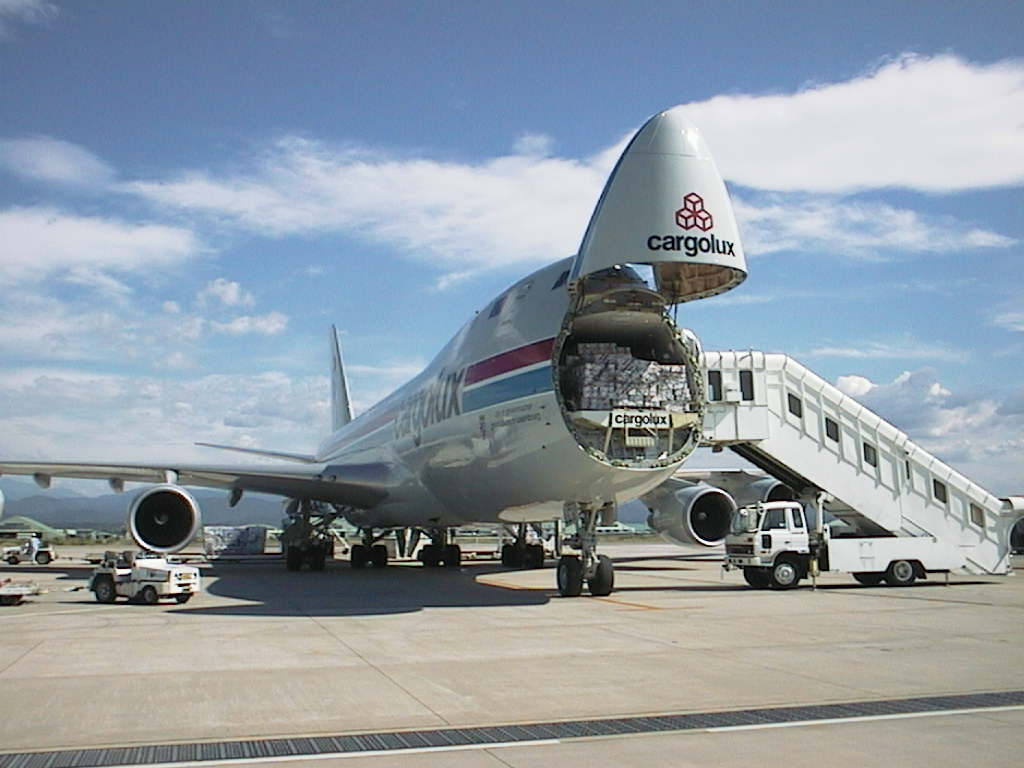
Cargolux Boeing 747-400F with the nose loading door open

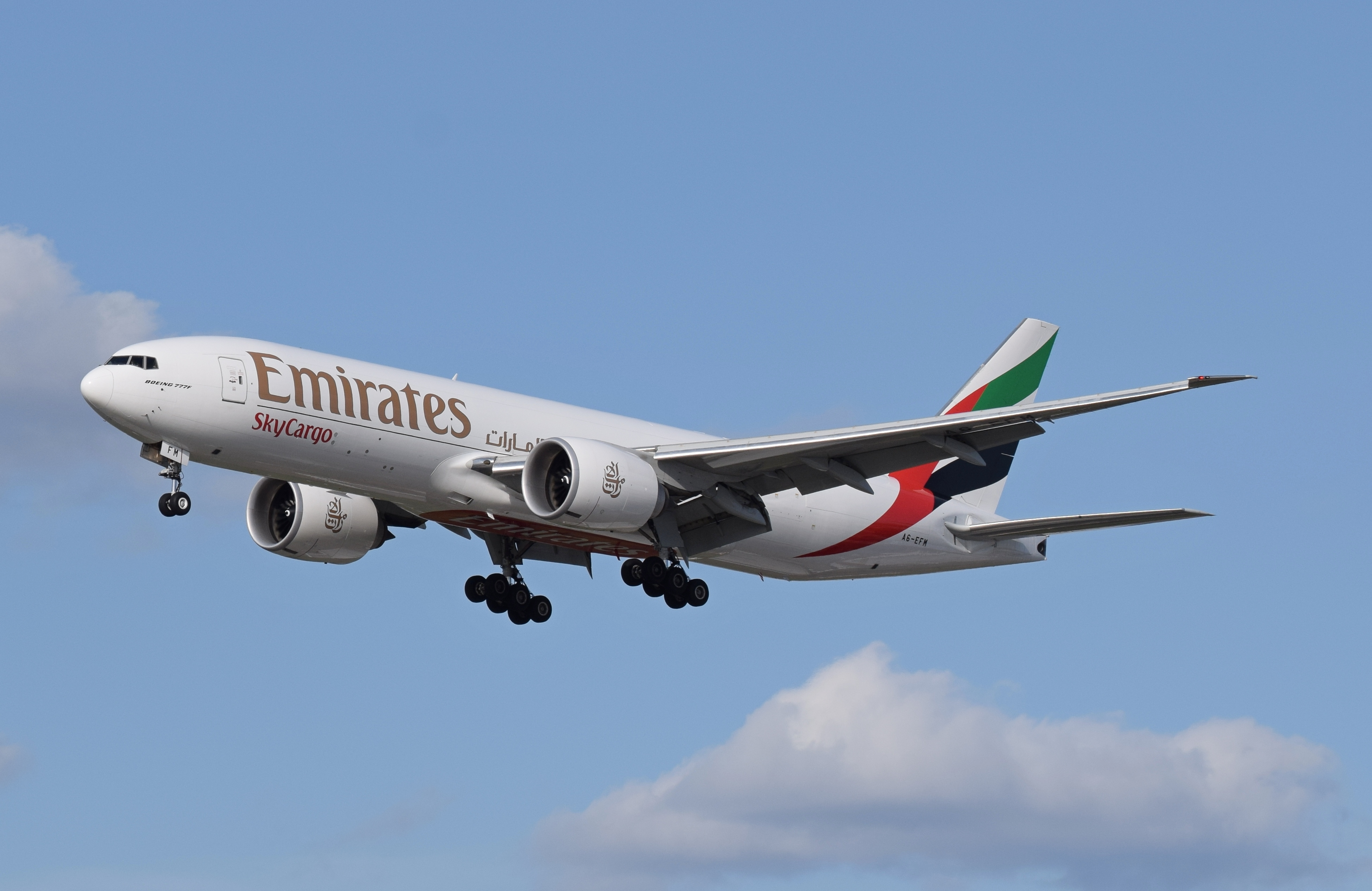
Boeing 777 freighter of Emirates arrives at London Heathrow Airport (2015).

Air cargo refers to any goods shipped by air, whereas air freight refers specifically to goods transported in the cargo hold of a dedicated cargo plane. Aircraft were first used to carry mail as cargo in 1911. Eventually manufacturers started designing aircraft for other types of freight as well.

There are many commercial aircraft suitable for carrying cargo such as the Boeing 747 and the more prominent An‑124, which was purposely built for easy conversion into a cargo aircraft. Such large aircraft employ standardized quick-loading containers known as unit load devices (ULDs), comparable to ISO containers on cargo ships. ULDs can be stowed in the lower decks (front and rear) of several wide-body aircraft, and on the main deck of some narrow-bodies. Some dedicated cargo planes have a large opening front for loading.

Air freight shipments are very similar to LTL shipments in terms of size and packaging requirements. However, air freight or air cargo shipments typically need to move at much faster speeds than 800 km or 497 mi per hour. While shipments move faster than standard LTL, air shipments do not always actually move by air. Air shipments may be booked directly with the carriers, through brokers or with online marketplace services. In the US, there are certain restrictions on cargo moving via air freight on passenger aircraft, most notably the transport of rechargeable lithium-ion battery shipments.

Shippers in the US must be approved and be "known" in the Known Shipper Management System before their shipments can be tendered on passenger aircraft.

=== Rail ===
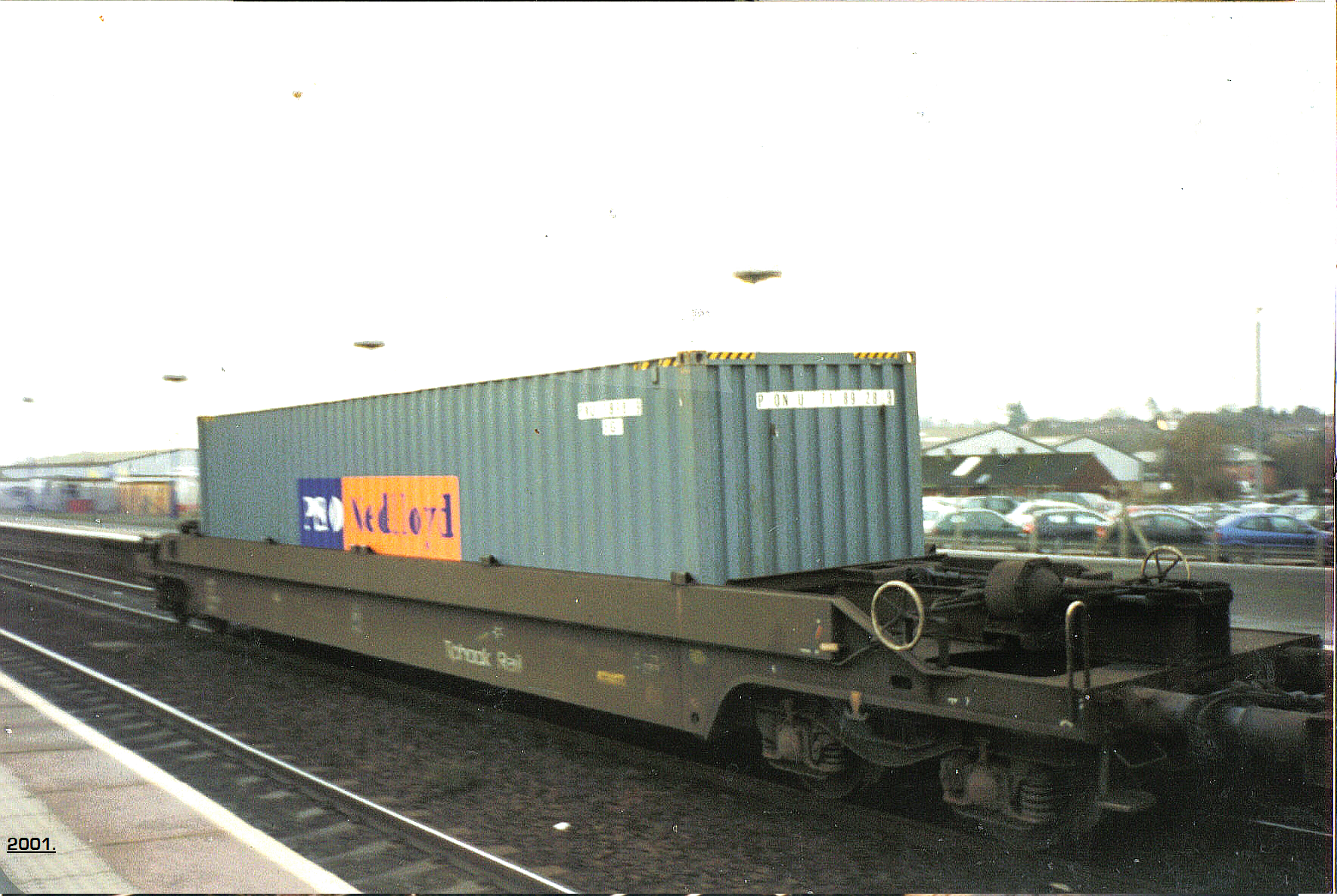
P&O Nedlloyd intermodal container in a tiphook intermodal freight well wagon at Banbury station. England, 2001

Trains are capable of transporting a large number of containers that come from shipping ports. Trains are also used to transport water, cement, grain, steel, wood and coal. They are used because they can carry a large amount and generally have a direct route to the destination. Under the right circumstances, freight transport by rail is more economical and energy efficient than by road, mainly when carried in bulk or over long distances.

The main disadvantage of rail freight is its lack of flexibility. For this reason, rail has lost much of the freight business to road transport. Rail freight is often subject to transshipment costs, since it must be transferred from one mode of transportation to another. Practices such as containerization aim at minimizing these costs. When transporting point-to-point bulk loads such as cement or grain, with specialised bulk handling facilities at the rail sidings, the rail mode of transport remains the most convenient and preferred option.

Many governments are encouraging shippers to increase their use of rail rather than transport because of trains' lower environmental impact.

=== Road ===
Many firms, like Parcelforce, FedEx and R+L Carriers transport various types of cargo by road, including letters, houses, and cargo containers.

Food is commonly transported on roads in order to regularly supply supermarkets with fresh food. Retailers and manufacturers of all kinds use delivery trucks, ranging in size from full semi trucks to smaller delivery vans. Organizations such as the World Bank sometimes use the level of commercial freight transported by smaller businesses as a barometer of healthy economic development.

==== Less-than-truckload freight ====
Less than truckload (LTL) cargo is the first category of freight shipment, representing the majority of freight shipments and the majority of business-to-business (B2B) shipments. LTL shipments are also often referred to as motor freight and the carriers involved are referred to as motor carriers.

LTL shipments range from 50 to 7,000 kg (110 to 15,430 lb), being less than 2.5 to 8.5 m (8 ft 2.4 in to 27 ft 10.6 in) the majority of times. The average single piece of LTL freight is 600 kg (1,323 lb) and the size of a standard pallet. Long freight and/or large freight are subject to extreme length and cubic capacity surcharges.

Trailers used in LTL can range from 28 to 53 ft (8.53 to 16.15 m). The standard for city deliveries is usually 48 ft (14.63 m). In tight and residential environments the 28 ft (8.53 m) trailer is used the most.

The shipments are usually palletized, stretch [shrink]-wrapped and packaged for a mixed-freight environment. Unlike express or parcel, LTL shippers must provide their own packaging, as carriers do not provide any packaging supplies or assistance. However, circumstances may require crating or another substantial packaging.

==== Truckload freight ====
In the United States, shipments larger than about 7,000 kg (15,432 lb) are typically classified as truckload (TL) freight. This is because it is more efficient and economical for a large shipment to have exclusive use of one larger trailer rather than share space on a smaller LTL trailer.

By the Federal Bridge Gross Weight Formula the total weight of a loaded truck (tractor and trailer, 5-axle rig) cannot exceed 80,000 lb (36,287 kg) in the United States. In ordinary circumstances, long-haul equipment will weigh about 15,000 kg (33,069 lb), leaving about 20,000 kg (44,092 lb) of freight capacity. Similarly a load is limited to the space available in the trailer, normally 48 ft (14.63 m) or 53 ft (16.15 m) long, 2.6 m (102 3/8 in) wide, 9 ft 0 in (2.74 m) high and 13 ft 6 in or 4.11 m high overall.

While express, parcel and LTL shipments are always intermingled with other shipments on a single piece of equipment and are typically reloaded across multiple pieces of equipment during their transport, TL shipments usually travel as the only shipment on a trailer. In fact, TL shipments usually deliver on exactly the same trailer as they are picked up on.

==== Shipment categories ====
Freight is usually organized into various shipment categories before it is transported. An item's category is determined by:

- the type of item being carried. For example, a kettle could fit into the category 'household goods'.
- how large the shipment is, in terms of both item size and quantity.
- how long the item for delivery will be in transit.

Shipments are typically categorized as household goods, express, parcel, and freight shipments:

- Household goods (HHG) include furniture, art and similar items.
- Express: Very small business or personal items like envelopes are considered overnight express or express letter shipments. These shipments are rarely over a few kilograms or pounds and almost always travel in the carrier's own packaging. Express shipments almost always travel some distance by air. An envelope may go coast to coast in the United States overnight or it may take several days, depending on the service options and prices chosen by the shipper.
- Parcel: Larger items like small boxes are considered parcels or ground shipments. These shipments are rarely over 50 kg (110 lb), with no single piece of the shipment weighing more than about 70 kg (154 lb). Parcel shipments are always boxed, sometimes in the shipper's packaging and sometimes in carrier-provided packaging. Service levels are again variable but most ground shipments will move about 800 to 1,100 km (497 to 684 mi) per day. Depending on the package's origin, it can travel from coast to coast in the United States in about four days. Parcel shipments rarely travel by air and typically move via road and rail. Parcels represent the majority of business-to-consumer (B2C) shipments.
- Freight: Beyond HHG, express, and parcel shipments, movements are termed freight shipments.

== Shipping costs ==
An LTL shipper often realizes savings by utilizing a freight broker, online marketplace or another intermediary, instead of contracting directly with a trucking company. Brokers can shop the marketplace and obtain lower rates than most smaller shippers can obtain directly. In the LTL marketplace, intermediaries typically receive 50% to 80% discounts from published rates, whereas a small shipper may only be offered a 5% to 30% discount by the carrier. Intermediaries are licensed by the DOT and have the requirements to provide proof of insurance.

Truckload (TL) carriers usually charge a rate per kilometre or mile. The rate varies depending on the distance, geographic location of the delivery, items being shipped, equipment type required, and service times required. TL shipments usually receive a variety of surcharges very similar to those described for LTL shipments above. There are thousands more small carriers in the TL market than in the LTL market. Therefore, the use of transportation intermediaries or brokers is widespread.

Another cost-saving method is facilitating pickups or deliveries at the carrier's terminals. Carriers or intermediaries can provide shippers with the address and phone number for the closest shipping terminal to the origin and/or destination. By doing this, shippers avoid any accessorial fees that might normally be charged for liftgate, residential pickup/delivery, inside pickup/delivery, or notifications/appointments.

Shipping experts optimize their service and costs by sampling rates from several carriers, brokers and online marketplaces. When obtaining rates from different providers, shippers may find a wide range in the pricing offered. If a shipper in the United States uses a broker, freight forwarder or another transportation intermediary, it is common for the shipper to receive a copy of the carrier's Federal Operating Authority. Freight brokers and intermediaries are also required by Federal Law to be licensed by the Federal Highway Administration. Experienced shippers avoid unlicensed brokers and forwarders because if brokers are working outside the law by not having a Federal Operating License, the shipper has no protection in case of a problem. Also, shippers typically ask for a copy of the broker's insurance certificate and any specific insurance that applies to the shipment.

Overall, shipping costs have fallen over the past decades. A further drop in shipping costs in the future might be realized through the application of improved 3D printing technologies.

== Security concerns ==
Governments are very concerned with cargo shipment, as it may bring security risks to a country. Therefore, many governments have enacted rules and regulations, administered by a customs agency, for the handling of cargo to minimize risks of terrorism and other crime. Governments are mainly concerned with cargo entering through a country's borders.

The United States has been one of the leaders in securing cargo. They see cargo as a concern to national security. After the terrorist attacks of September 11th, the security of this magnitude of cargo has become highlighted on the over 6 million cargo containers that enter the United States ports each year. The latest US Government response to this threat is the CSI: Container Security Initiative. CSI is a program intended to help increase security for containerized cargo shipped to the United States from around the world. Europe is also focusing on this issue, with several EU-funded projects underway.

== Stabilization ==
Many ways and materials are available to stabilize and secure cargo in various modes of transport. Conventional load securing methods and materials such as steel strapping and plastic/wood blocking and bracing have been used for decades and are still widely used. Present load-securing methods offer several other options, including polyester strapping and lashing, synthetic webbings and dunnage bags, also known as airbags or inflatable bags.

Practical advice on stabilization is given in the International Guidelines on Safe Load Securing for Road Transport.

Stabilization methods

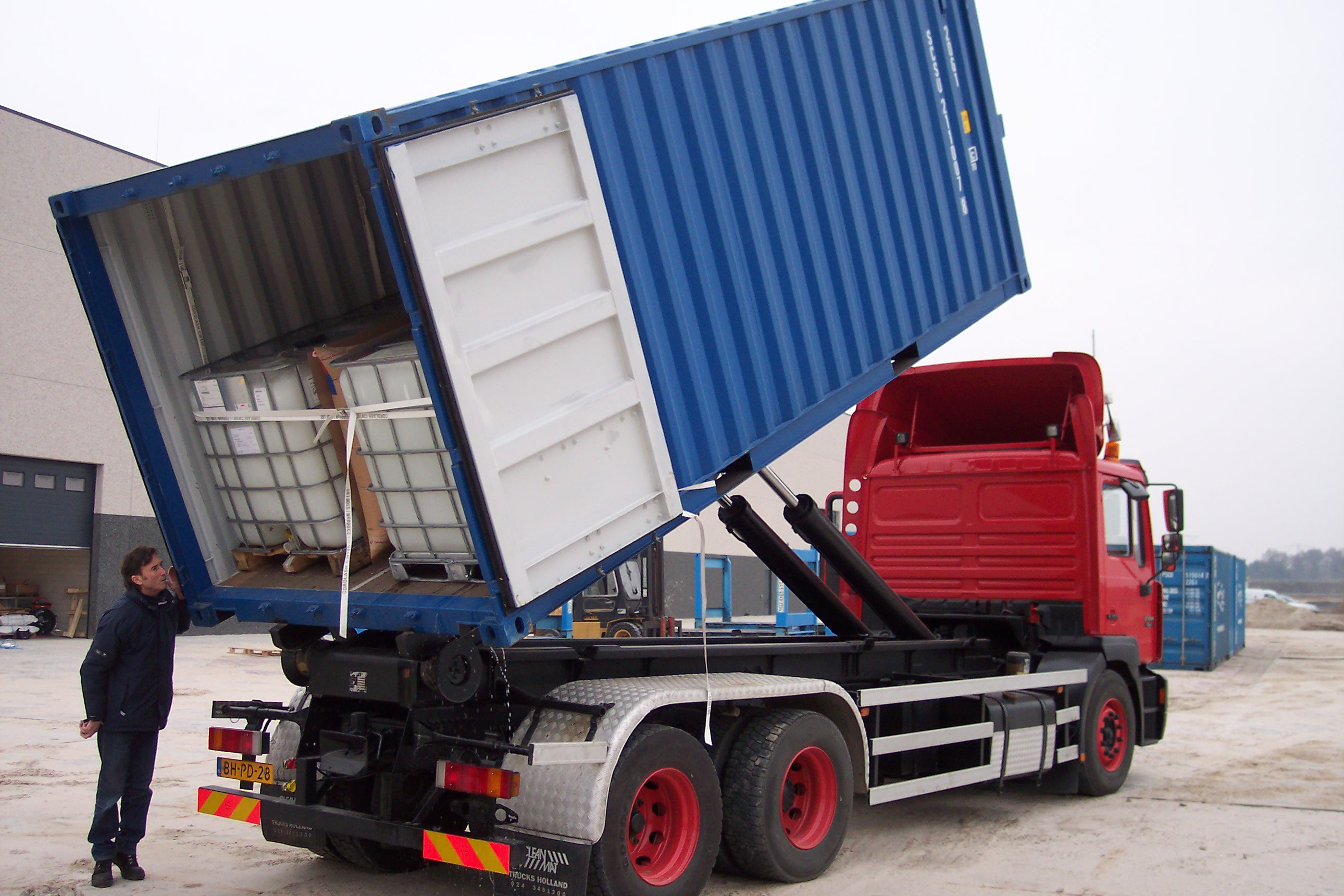
Application in container

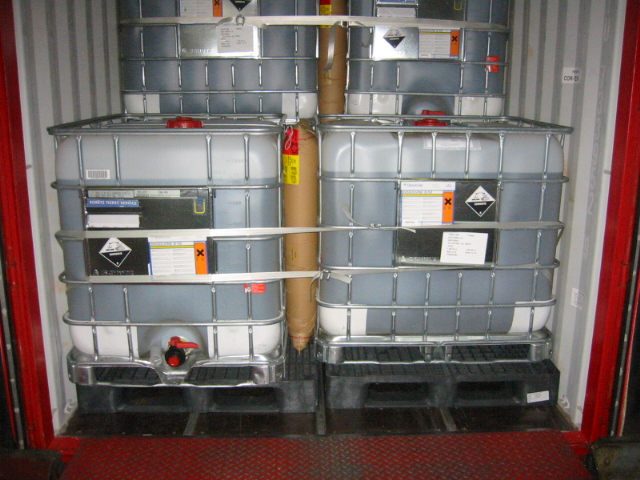
Polyester strapping and dunnage bag

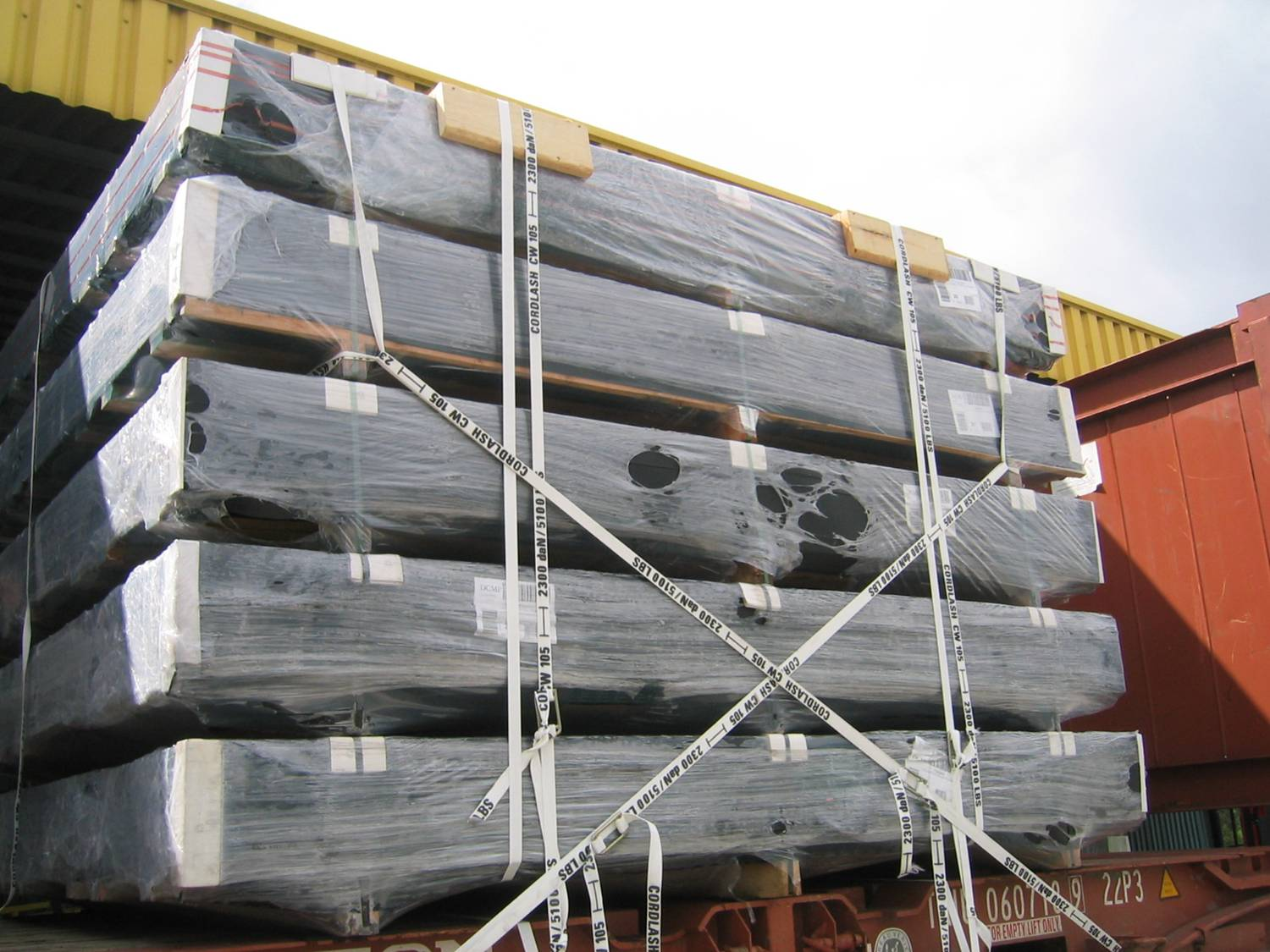
Polyester lashing

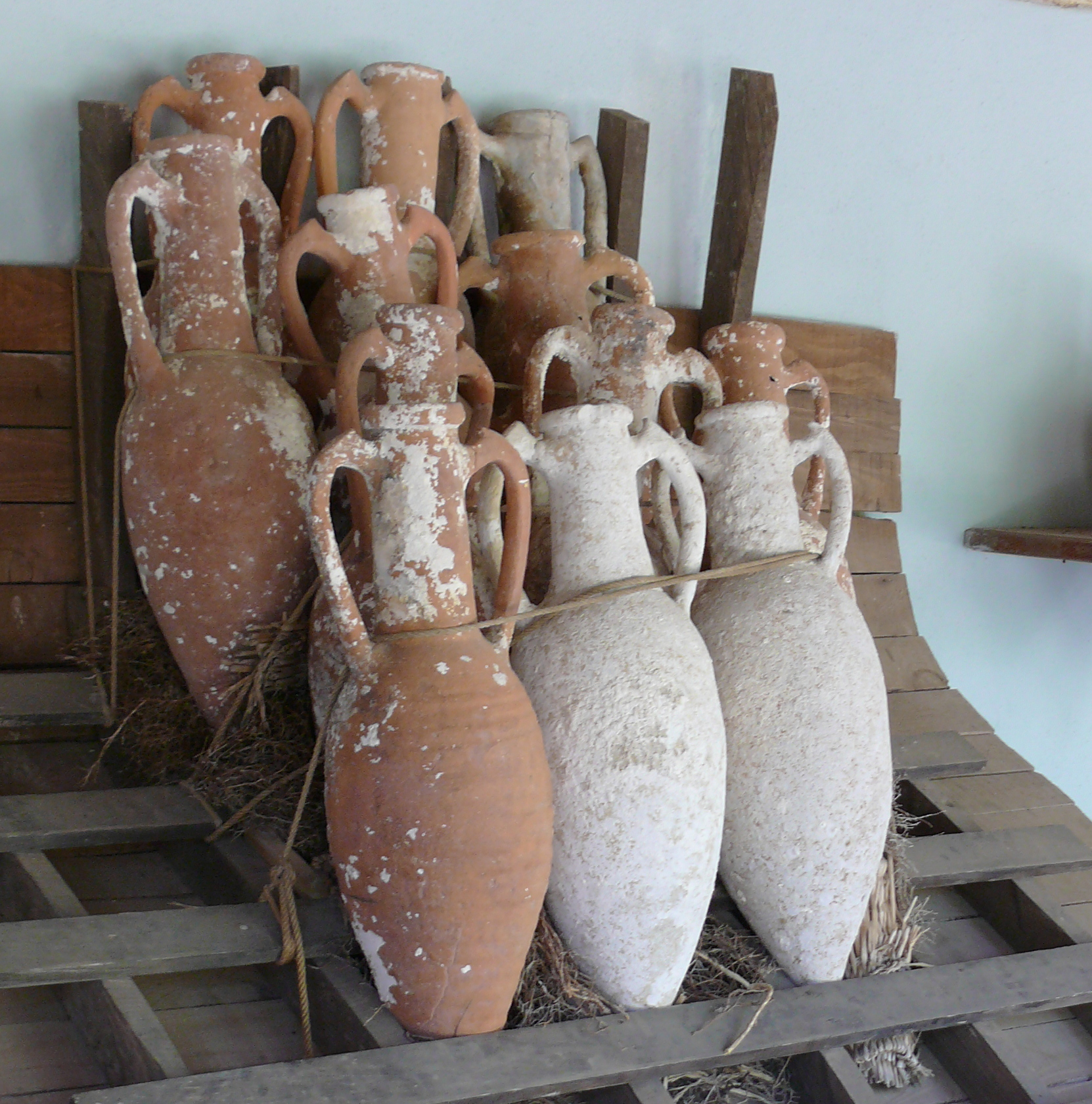
Bronze Age amphorae from shipwrecks near Bodrum, Turkey, with rack and roping device illustrating how they might have been kept from shifting

== See also ==
- Cargo airline
- Cargo cult
- Cargo sampling
- Cargo scanning
- Counter-to-counter package
- DAT Solutions (a.k.a. Dial-a-truck)
- Delivery
- Document automation in management
- Freight company
- Freight Transport Association
- Goods
- Goods train
- List of cargo types
- Products
- Standard Carrier Alpha Codes
