= Cargo sampling =

Cargo sampling is the taking and retaining of true representative samples of commodity products, usually to facilitate payment to a shipper for cargo leaving its port of loading.

Samples may be taken from all points in the supply chain, from warehouses, terminals, barges, ships, pipelines or service stations.

Accurately taken and labeled samples with an unequivocal chain of custody are essential to all operations. Effective and consistent cargo sampling requires a specialized staff of trained individuals who are responsible for taking such samples and transporting them to the corresponding testing laboratories.
