= 2018 United States elections =

- ← 2016 2017 2018 2019 2020 → Midterm elections
- Election day: November 6
- Incumbent president: ▌Donald Trump (R)
- Next Congress: 116th

Senate elections
- Overall control: Republican hold
- Seats contested: 35 of 100 seats (33 seats of Class I + 2 special elections)
- Net seat change: Republican +2
- 2018 Senate results (Minnesota and Mississippi each held two Senate elections) Democratic hold Republican hold Democratic gain Republican gain Independent hold

House elections
- Overall control: Democratic gain
- Seats contested: All 435 voting seats +5 of 6 non-voting seats (Note: One non-voting member of the House of Representatives, the Resident Commissioner of Puerto Rico, serves a four-year term and was not up for election in 2018.)
- Popular vote margin: Democratic +8.6%
- Net seat change: Democratic +41
- 2018 House of Representatives results (territorial delegate races not shown) Democratic hold Republican hold Democratic gain Republican gain

Gubernatorial elections
- Seats contested: 39 (36 states, three territories)
- Net seat change: Democratic +7 (Note: Democrats won a net gain of seven state governorships.)
- 2018 gubernatorial election results Democratic hold Republican hold Democratic gain Republican gain

Elections were held in the United States on November 6, 2018. (Note: Some special elections as well as the regularly-scheduled elections in the Northern Mariana Islands were held on other dates.) In these midterm elections, which occurred during incumbent Republican President Donald Trump's first term, all 435 seats in the U.S. House of Representatives and 35 of the 100 seats in the U.S. Senate were contested to determine the 116th United States Congress. The Republican Party increased its majority in the Senate. Democratic incumbents and challengers vastly outperformed Trump's margin in Republican-leaning states, and unified Republican control of Congress and the White House was brought to an end when the Democratic Party won control of the House of Representatives. In what was widely characterized as a blue wave election, Democrats also gained governorships, other statewide offices, and state legislative chambers.

Democrats made a net gain of 40 seats in the United States House of Representatives, (Note: Democrats won a net gain of 40 seats on election day, but gained one more seat in a special election held earlier in 2018. One House seat in North Carolina remained vacant after the elections due to allegations of election fraud; a special election filled it in 2019.) gaining a majority in the chamber and thereby ending the federal trifecta that the Republican Party had established in the 2016 elections. The Republican Party retained control of the United States Senate, making a net gain of two seats and defeating four Democratic incumbents in states that had voted for Trump in 2016. As a result of the 2018 elections, the 116th United States Congress became the first Congress since the 99th United States Congress (elected in 1984) in which the Democrats controlled the U.S. House of Representatives and the Republicans controlled the U.S. Senate. In state-level elections, Democrats picked up a net of seven governorships and several state legislative seats.

This was the first time since 1970 that one party gained Senate seats while losing House seats, which had also occurred in 1914 and 1962, and would go on to also happen in 2020, 2022, and 2024 as well. In the state elections, Democrats gained seven state governorships, control of approximately 350 state legislative seats, and control of six state legislative chambers.

The elections marked the highest voter turnout seen in midterm elections since 1914, at 49.4%. The elections saw several electoral firsts for women, racial minorities, and LGBT candidates, including the election of the first openly gay governor and the first openly bisexual U.S. senator. In various referendums, numerous states voted to expand Medicaid coverage, require voter identification, establish independent redistricting commissions, legalize marijuana, repeal felony disenfranchisement laws and enact other proposals. During the campaign, Democrats focused on health care, frequently attacking Republicans for supporting repeal of provisions of the Affordable Care Act (also known as Obamacare), including protections for individuals with preexisting conditions. They also focused on tying many Republican incumbents and candidates to President Trump. Republican messaging focused on immigration and the Tax Cuts and Jobs Act of 2017. There were allegations of attempted Russian interference in these elections as well as controversies regarding potential voter suppression.

Research has linked Republican losses in the elections to the party's unsuccessful and unpopular efforts to repeal the Affordable Care Act, as well as the China–United States trade war.

== Issues, advertisements, and campaigning ==
In May 2018, President Trump began to emphasize his effort to overcome the traditional strength of the non-presidential party in midterm elections, with the "top priority for the White House [being to hold] the Republican majority in the Senate". He was already well into his own 2020 reelection campaign, having launched it on his inauguration day in January 2017. By early August, the president's midterm efforts had included rallies in Ohio, Pennsylvania, Florida, Montana and elsewhere "reprising the style and rhetoric of his 2016 campaign". He focused his message on the economy, his proposed border wall, the "trade war" with China, criticism of the media, and his proposal to create the space force, a new branch of the military devoted to operations in space. In late August 2018, the Huffington Post reported that Trump and his administration had been engaging in campaign activity on taxpayer-funded trips. According to the report, a top White House staffer identified 35 events by Cabinet and senior staff members "with or affecting House districts in August already". White House Deputy Press Secretary Lindsay Walters called the report "misleading".

The 2018 elections featured a wider range and larger number of campaign advertisements than past midterm elections. Almost a third of Republican ads focused on taxes, especially on the recently enacted Tax Cuts and Jobs Act of 2017. By mid-October 2018, at a cost of some $124 million, more than 280,000 television advertisements related to immigration had been aired in House, Senate and gubernatorial races, representing a five-fold increase compared to the 2014 cycle. In October 2018, The New York Times and The Washington Post characterized Republicans' 2018 campaign messaging as being chiefly focused on fear-mongering about immigration and race. According to The Washington Post, President Trump "settled on a strategy of fear—laced with falsehoods and racially tinged rhetoric—to help lift his party to victory in the coming midterms, part of a broader effort to energize Republican voters". In November 2018, Facebook, NBC, and Fox News withdrew a controversial pro-Trump advertisement that focused on a migrant caravan; Facebook noted that the ad violated Facebook's rules concerning "sensational content".

Nearly half of all advertisements by Democrats focused on health care, in particular on defending the Patient Protection and Affordable Care Act (also known as Obamacare or the Affordable Care Act) and keeping in place protections for individuals with preexisting conditions. A number of Republican candidates claimed to support provisions of the Affordable Care Act, such as protections for preexisting conditions, even though they supported efforts that either weakened or eliminated those provisions. In the final weeks of the campaign, Democrats indicated their desire to keep the focus of the campaign on Republican efforts to repeal provisions of Obamacare through the proposed American Health Care Act of 2017. A Gallup poll conducted days before the election found that voters considered healthcare and the economy to be the top issues among registered voters, though many voters also considered immigration to be a top priority.

== Federal elections ==
=== Senate ===
Control of Senate seats by class after the 2018 elections
Class	Democratic	Republican	Independent	Next elections
1	21	10	2	2024
2	12	21	0	2020
3	12	22	0	2022
Total	45	53	2	—N/a

In the 2018 elections, Republicans sought to defend the Senate majority they had maintained since the 2014 elections. Thirty-five of the 100 seats were up for election, including all 33 Class 1 Senate seats. Class 2 Senate seats in Minnesota and Mississippi each held special elections to fill vacancies. The Class 1 Senate elections were for terms lasting from January 2019 to January 2025 while the Class 2 special elections were for terms ending in January 2021. 24 of the seats up for election were held by Democrats, two of the seats up for election were held by independents caucusing with the Democrats and nine of the seats up for election were held by Republicans. Three Republican incumbents did not seek election in 2018 while all Democratic and independent incumbents sought another term. 42 Republican senators and 23 Democratic senators were not up for election.

Assuming the two independents won re-election and continued to caucus with them, Senate Democrats needed to win a net gain of two Senate seats to win a majority. (Note: Democrats needed to win 51 seats to acquire a Senate majority. In a hypothetical tied Senate where each caucus had 50 senators, the vote of Republican Vice President Mike Pence would have given Senate Republicans the majority.) Including the two independents, Democrats held approximately 74 percent of the seats up for election, the highest proportion held by one party in a midterm election since at least 1914. Prior to the 2018 elections, Nate Silver of FiveThirtyEight wrote that Democrats faced one of the most unfavorable Senate maps any party had ever faced in any Senate election. Silver noted that ten of the seats Democrats defended were in states won by Donald Trump in the 2016 presidential election. Meanwhile, the Class I Senate seat in Nevada was the lone Republican-held seat up for election in a state that had been won by Democratic nominee Hillary Clinton in the 2016 presidential election. Silver predicted that even a nine-point victory in the nationwide popular vote for Congress would not be enough to give Democrats a majority in the Senate. Some observers speculated that Republicans might be able to pick up a net of nine seats, which would give them the 60-seat super-majority necessary to break filibusters on legislation.

Senate Majority Leader Mitch McConnell decided to cancel the traditional August recess, which drew controversy. The US Congress traditionally goes on recess in the month of August each year, which in election years allows incumbents to leave Washington D.C. and campaign for re-election in their home state. The Democratic Party had a significantly larger number of vulnerable incumbent Senators, who became unable to campaign in person during the affected time period while their non-incumbent opponents were unaffected. The House of Representatives did not cancel their 2018 August recess.

Republicans won a net gain of two seats in the Senate. The 2018 elections were the first midterm elections since 2002 in which the party holding the presidency gained Senate seats. Republicans defeated Democratic incumbents in Indiana, Missouri, North Dakota and Florida. Democrats defeated the Republican incumbent in Nevada and picked up an open seat in Arizona. All four defeated Democratic incumbents represented states won by Trump in the 2016 presidential election. Democratic incumbents tallied victories in the competitive Midwestern states of Ohio, Michigan and Wisconsin as well as the key Northeastern swing state of Pennsylvania. Montana and West Virginia, both of which voted for Trump by a margin of at least 20 points, also re-elected Democratic incumbents. After the election, Chris Cillizza of CNN noted that by limiting their Senate losses in 2018, Democrats put themselves in a position to potentially take control of the Senate in the 2020 or 2022 Senate elections.

=== House of Representatives ===
Cartogram of U.S. House of Representative results: Democratic gain Republican gain Democratic hold Republican hold Independent hold

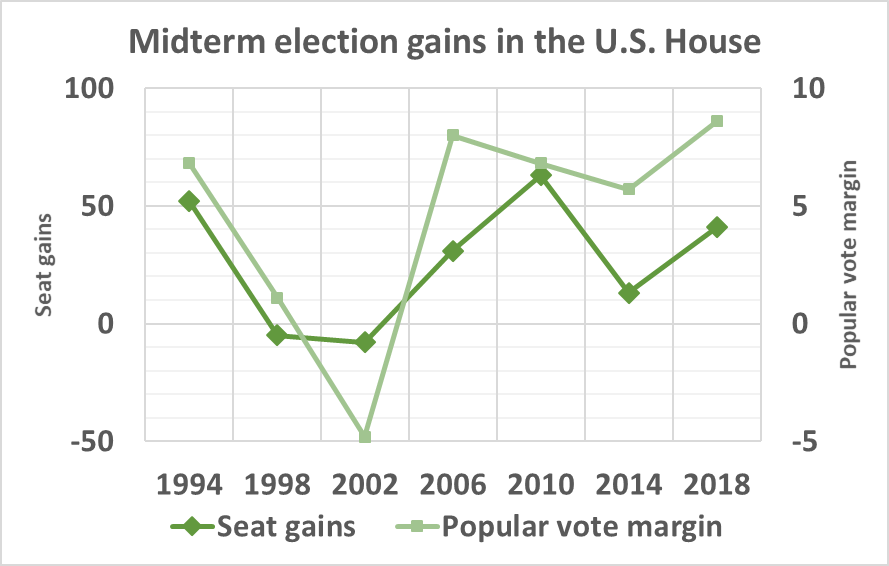
Historical mid-term seat gains in the House of Representatives for the party not holding the presidency

In the 2018 elections, Democrats sought to take control of the United States House of Representatives for the first time since the 2010 elections. All 435 voting seats in the House of Representatives were up for election to serve two-year terms. Additionally, elections were held to select five of the six non-voting delegates for the District of Columbia and the U.S. territories.

The 2018 House elections saw the largest number of retirements by incumbents of any election cycle since at least 1992. By June 2018, 20 House Democrats and 44 House Republicans, including Speaker of the House Paul Ryan, had announced their retirement. The disproportionate number of Republican retirements may have harmed Republican prospects in the 2018 mid-term elections due to the loss of incumbency advantage.

Democrats had 193 seats immediately prior to the November elections, and needed to net at least 25 seats to win a majority in the House of Representatives. In the November elections, Democrats won a net gain of 40 seats. As the elections also saw Democrats fill two vacant seats that had previously been controlled by the party, the Democrats won control of a total of 235 seats, while Republicans won control of at least 199 seats. The net gain of 40 seats represented the Democratic Party's largest gain in the House since the 1974 elections. Democrats won the nationwide popular vote for the House of Representatives by 8.6 percentage points, one of the highest margins won by either party since 1992. Due in part to the surge in turnout, the total number of votes won by Democratic candidates for the House of Representatives nearly equaled the number of votes Trump won in the 2016 presidential election. The 2018 elections were the third midterm elections since 2006 in which the President's party lost control of the House of Representatives.

Democrats defeated 29 Republican incumbents and picked up 14 open seats. Republicans did not defeat a single Democratic incumbent, though the party did pick up two open seats in Minnesota and one in Pennsylvania. Republicans defended the vast majority of their rural seats, but several urban and suburban seats flipped to the Democrats. Many of the districts picked up by Democrats had given a majority or a plurality of their vote to Hillary Clinton in the 2016 presidential election. Of the 447 individuals who served in the House during the 115th Congress, at least 104 did not win re-election in 2018—this represents the third-highest turnover rate of any election cycle since 1974.

==== Special elections ====
There were a total of eight special elections to the United States House of Representatives in 2018. These elections were held to fill vacancies for the remainder of the 115th Congress. As a result of the special elections held prior to November 6, Democrats won a net gain of one seat.

Four special elections were held prior to November 6, 2018:

- Special election in Pennsylvania's 18th congressional district following the resignation of Tim Murphy (R), held on March 13, 2018; won by Conor Lamb (D).
- Special election in Arizona's 8th congressional district following the resignation of Trent Franks (R), held on April 24, 2018; won by Debbie Lesko (R).
- Special election in Texas's 27th congressional district following the resignation of Blake Farenthold (R), held on June 30, 2018; won by Michael Cloud (R).
- Special election in Ohio's 12th congressional district following the resignation of Pat Tiberi (R), held on August 7, 2018; won by Troy Balderson (R).

Four special elections were held on November 6, 2018, coinciding with the regularly scheduled elections:

- Special election in Michigan's 13th congressional district following the resignation of John Conyers (D); won by Brenda Jones (D).
- Special election in Pennsylvania's 7th congressional district following the resignation of Pat Meehan (R); won by Mary Gay Scanlon (D).
- Special election in Pennsylvania's 15th congressional district following the resignation of Charlie Dent (R); won by Susan Wild (D).
- Special election in New York's 25th congressional district following the death of Louise Slaughter (D); won by Joseph Morelle (D).

== State elections ==
Partisan control of states in the 2018 elections Democrats retained trifecta Democrats gained trifecta Republicans retained trifecta Republicans gained trifecta Divided government maintained Divided government established Officially non-partisan legislature

The vast majority of states held gubernatorial or state legislative elections in 2018. The 2018 state elections will impact the redistricting that will follow the 2020 United States census as many states task governors and state legislators with drawing new boundaries for state legislative and Congressional districts.

=== Gubernatorial elections ===
Elections were held for the governorships of 36 U.S. states and three U.S. territories as well as for the Mayor of the District of Columbia. Democrats defended every seat they had controlled prior to the election and picked up seven governorships. They won open seats in Michigan, Nevada, Kansas, New Mexico and Maine and defeated Republican incumbents in Illinois and Wisconsin. They also picked up the independent-held seat in the U.S. Virgin Islands in a runoff election held November 20, 2018. Most of the Democratic victories were in Democratic-leaning states or swing states. Democratic candidates ran well ahead of Hillary Clinton in South Dakota, Oklahoma, Idaho, South Carolina and other "red states" that had given large margins to Trump in the 2016 presidential. All of those candidates fell short, however, and Kansas was the lone red state to elect a Democratic governor in 2018.

Republicans picked up the independent-held seat in Alaska, and Republican incumbents won election in competitive and Democratic-leaning states such as Arizona, Iowa, Massachusetts, Vermont, New Hampshire and Maryland. The party also won competitive open seat elections held in Florida, Georgia and Ohio. Democrats picked up the governorship of Guam, but the incumbent Republican governor of the Northern Marianas Islands won re-election. (Note: The 2018 general election in the Northern Marianas Islands were delayed until November 13 due to Typhoon Yutu, which struck the territory shortly before the scheduled November 6 election date.)

=== Legislative elections ===
Partisan control of congressional redistricting after the 2018 elections. Note that some states held elections in 2020 that affected partisan control of the decennial redistricting which occurred prior to 2022 elections. Democratic control Republican control Split or bipartisan control Independent redistricting commission No redistricting necessary (Note: States labeled as "no redistricting necessary" currently only have one congressional district, and thus do not need to redistrict. However, some projections show that, prior to the next round of redistricting, Rhode Island could lose its second district and Montana could gain a second district.)

Eighty-seven of the 99 state legislative chambers, in 46 states—6,069 seats out of the nation's 7,383 legislative seats (82%)—held regularly scheduled elections. Every territorial legislature except for the Legislative Assembly of Puerto Rico held elections for at least one chamber. In some legislative chambers, all seats were up for election, but some chambers with staggered terms held elections only for a portion of the seats in the chamber. (Note: There were no legislative elections in the four states (Louisiana, Mississippi, New Jersey and Virginia) which hold state elections in odd-numbered years. There were also no elections to the Kansas Senate, Minnesota Senate, New Mexico Senate and South Carolina Senate since all seats in those chambers are elected in presidential-election years.)

Democrats flipped at least 350 state legislative seats, picking up most of those seats in states where President Trump's approval rating was relatively low. Six chambers—the Colorado Senate, New Hampshire House, New Hampshire Senate, Minnesota House, Maine Senate and New York State Senate—flipped from Republican to Democratic control. Additionally the Connecticut Senate went from being evenly divided to a Democratic majority. Democrats also broke Republican legislative supermajorities in North Carolina, Michigan and Pennsylvania and gained a legislative supermajority in both houses of the California, Illinois and Oregon legislatures.

Democrats gained a trifecta (control of the governor's office and both legislative chambers) in Colorado, Illinois, Connecticut, Maine, New Mexico, New York and Nevada as well as in Guam and the U.S. Virgin Islands. Republicans lost trifectas in Kansas, Michigan, Wisconsin and New Hampshire. After the election, Democrats had 14 trifectas, Republicans had 21 trifectas, and 14 states had a divided government. (Note: It is impossible for either party to achieve a trifecta in Nebraska, which has a unicameral, non-partisan legislature.) Minnesota became the lone multicameral state legislature in the nation with divided control, with the Democratic Party hold a majority in its state house and the Republican Party holding a majority in its state senate. All other state legislatures were either unicameral or had unified bicameral party control. In Alaska, Republicans won the gubernatorial election and held a majority of the seats in both chambers of the state legislature, but a coalition of independents, Democrats, and Republicans elected independent Bryce Edgmon as Speaker of the Alaska House of Representatives.

All parties presented candidates in more races than usual. The number of Democratic candidates increased to almost 88% of the races in 2018 from 77% in 2014. Parties often do not run in races where the incumbent or other favorite candidate has a very high margin in polls, in order to focus resources on more competitive races with greater chances of success; however, increasing the number of candidates is seen as a way to drive local voter engagement and increase the number of votes for other, more competitive races at an upper level.

Despite these Democratic gains, the party controlled a total of just 37 state legislative chambers after the election, far fewer chambers than it had controlled prior to the 2010 elections. Tim Storey of the National Conference of State Legislatures attributed the continuing Republican dominance of state legislatures in part to Republican control of redistricting in many states following 2010. In at least three states (Pennsylvania, North Carolina, and Michigan), Republicans retained control of the lower house even though a majority of voters voted for a Democratic candidate for the lower house. In many states, Democrats indicated their hope that 2018 would be part of a "two-cycle process", with gains in 2018 putting the party within distance of taking control of more state legislative chambers in the 2020 elections.

=== Other state elections ===
Many states have statewide elected officials other than the governor. Such positions include secretary of state, attorney general, treasurer and auditor. These officials can play important roles in setting policy and overseeing state functions. In 2018, Democrats won attorneys general races in Michigan, Wisconsin, Nevada and Colorado; each position had previously been held by a Republican. After the elections, Democrats held 27 of the 50 attorneys general positions in the country. Democrats also won control of the office of secretary of state in Michigan, Arizona, and Colorado, although Republicans still held a majority of the elected secretary of state positions nationwide. Other offices that Democrats won control of in 2018 include the Arizona Superintendent of Public Instruction, the Maine State Treasurer, the Iowa State Auditor and the Florida Commissioner of Agriculture.

=== Attorney general ===
Results of the 2018 US Attorney General elections Republican hold Democratic hold Democratic gain No election

Attorneys General were elected in 30 states, 2 territories, and the District of Columbia. 43 states elect their attorney general, and 7 are appointed through other processes. The previous Attorney General elections for this group of states took place in 2014, except in Vermont where Attorneys General only serve two-year terms and elected their current attorney general in 2016.

Democrats gained 4 elected Attorney General offices, Republicans gained zero offices. This caused Democratic Attorney Generals to constitute a majority of elected Attorneys General in U.S. states.

=== Ballot measures ===
Medicaid expansion proposal passed Medicaid expansion previously implemented or passed No Medicaid expansion

A total of 157 ballot measures were voted on in 34 states. These include initiatives on redistricting reform, voting rights, marijuana, infrastructure, health care and taxes.

As a result of successful ballot measures, Colorado, Michigan and Utah established independent redistricting commissions while Nebraska, Utah and Idaho expanded access to Medicaid. Florida voters approved Florida Amendment 4, which restored voting rights to some felons who have served out their sentence and banned off shore drilling, vaping in indoor work spaces, and gambling institutions related to dog racing. Nevada and Michigan approved automatic voter registration, and Michigan expanded absentee voting. Also, Maryland approved same-day voter registration, allowing voters to register as late as on Election Day. In Arkansas and North Carolina, voter ID ballot measures were approved. Michigan, Missouri and Utah voters approved marijuana proposals, with Michigan approving recreational marijuana and Missouri approving medical marijuana. Utah voters also approved medical marijuana, although Utah lawmakers later rolled back some of the provisions of the measure. North Dakota voters voted down a proposal to legalize recreational marijuana. In California, voters declined to repeal the 2017 Road Repair and Accountability Act, which increased fuel taxes and vehicle license fees to fund infrastructure improvements. Nationwide, 96 transportation ballot measures worth about $30.68 billion passed at the state and local levels on Election Day—41 transportation-related ballot measures failed.

== Local elections ==
=== Mayoral elections ===
Incumbent candidates won in mayoral elections held in major cities, including Anchorage, Alaska (Ethan Berkowitz); Austin, Texas (Steve Adler); Oakland, California (Libby Schaaf); Providence, Rhode Island (Jorge Elorza); and Washington, D.C. (Muriel Bowser). The District of Columbia and Oakland each re-elected mayors for the first time since 2002.

Incumbent mayors were also re-elected in Chesapeake, Virginia (Richard West); Chula Vista, California (Mary Salas); Irvine, California (Donald P. Wagner); Long Beach, California (Robert Garcia); Louisville, Kentucky (Greg Fischer); Lubbock, Texas (Dan Pope); Newark, New Jersey (Ras J. Baraka); Reno, Nevada (Hillary Schieve); San Jose, California (Sam Liccardo); and Santa Ana, California (Miguel Pulido). In San Bernardino, California, John Valdivia defeated incumbent Mayor R. Carey Davis. Open seats were won in Anaheim, California (Harry Sidhu); Chandler, Arizona (Kevin Hartke); Garland, Texas (Lori Barnett-Dodson); and Trenton, New Jersey (Reed Gusciora). In Oklahoma City, David Holt, a member of the Osage Nation, was the first Native American to be elected mayor. In Fort Smith, Arkansas, George McGill won an open seat and became the city's first black mayor.

Mayoral elections in November 2018 in Phoenix, Arizona, and Corpus Christi and Laredo, Texas, as well as Little Rock, Arkansas, resulted in no single candidate carrying a majority of the vote. Frank Scott Jr. won the December 2018 runoff to become Little Rock's first elected African-American mayor. In Texas, incumbents won their runoff races in Laredo (Pete Saenz) and Corpus Christi (Joe McComb). The Phoenix mayoral runoff was held in March 2019.

Although most local offices are nonpartisan, when looking at party identification of the officeholders, registered Republicans gained two mayorships during 2018. Linda Gorton won a seat previously held by a Democrat in Lexington, Kentucky and Bob Dyer won a seat previously held by an independent in Virginia Beach, Virginia. Following the November elections, registered Democrats hold 60 mayorships (−1) in the 100 largest cities in the United States, registered Republicans hold 28 (+2) and independents hold 7 (−1).

==== Special elections ====
Two nonpartisan mayoral special elections were held in 2018:

- Special election in Nashville, Tennessee following the resignation of Mayor Megan Barry, held on May 24, 2018; won by David Briley.
- Special election in San Francisco, California following the death of Mayor Ed Lee, held on June 5, 2018; won by London Breed.

=== Other local elections and referendums ===
- Washington, D.C., re-elected Democrats Michael D. Brown as shadow senator and Franklin Garcia as shadow representative, offices that are charged with lobbying Congress for D.C. statehood.
- Also during Washington, D.C.'s June 19 primary elections, voters approved Initiative 77, which would phase out the minimum wage exemption for tipped employees. The D.C. Council subsequently repealed the initiative.
- In Anchorage, Alaska, Municipal Proposition 1, a petition-based initiative to limit access to bathrooms and locker rooms based on biological sex, was defeated.
- At least two citizen initiatives sought to change how candidates are elected in non-partisan local elections with mixed results in 2018. In Fargo, North Dakota, voters approved the use of approval voting while in Lane County, Oregon voters rejected the use of STAR voting. Voters in Memphis, Tennessee rejected two referendums seeking to repeal the use of instant-runoff voting in city elections, which was set to begin being used in 2019.
- In Lincoln, Nebraska, voters approved a term-limits amendment to the city charter, blocking three-term incumbent Mayor Chris Beutler from running for re-election.

== Tribal elections ==
Several notable Native American tribes held elections for top tribal leadership positions during 2018.

Osage Nation Principal Chief Geoffrey Standing Bear, San Carlos Apache Nation Tribal Chairman Terry Rambler, and Lumbee Tribe of North Carolina Tribal Chairman Harvey Godwin Jr. were all re-elected to second terms. Penobscot Nation Tribal Chief Kirk Francis was re-elected to a fifth term. Long-time Chairman of the Quapaw Tribe John Berrey was reelected, and voters formally changed the tribe's name to the Quapaw Nation.

Navajo Nation President Jonathan Nez, Oglala Sioux Tribe President Julian Bear Runner, Rosebud Sioux Tribe President Rodney Bordeaux, Tunica-Biloxi Tribe Chairman Marshall Pierite, Yurok Tribal Chief Joe James, and United Houma Nation Principal Chief August "Cocoa" Creppel all won open seats. White Mountain Apache Tribal Chairwoman Gwendena Lee-Gatewood won an open seat to become the first woman elected to lead the tribe.

Ousted Northern Cheyenne Tribal Council President L. Jace Killsback was re-elected by two votes in a special election on January 2 after being removed from office in October 2017. He resigned from the position in October 2018 due to conflicts with the Tribal Council, triggering a new special election for January 2019.

== Party leadership elections ==
- Troy Price was re-elected chair of the Iowa Democratic Party.
- Mike Madigan was re-elected chair of the Illinois Democratic Party.

== Turnout ==
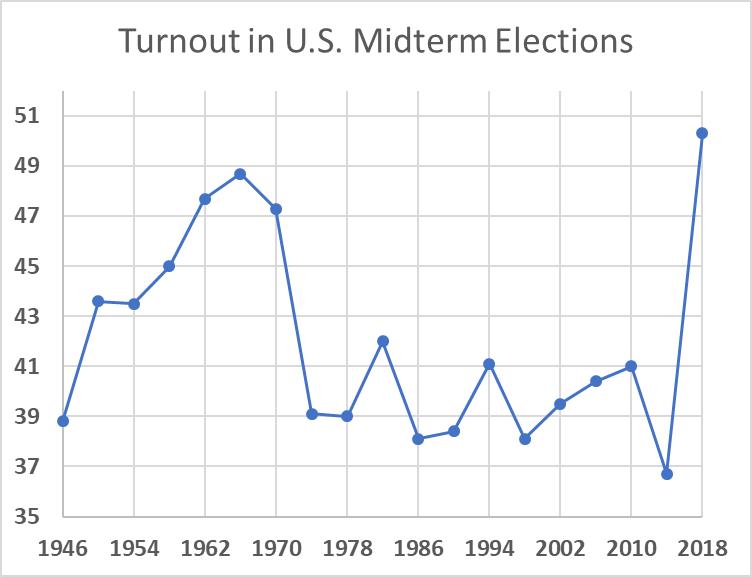
Turnout of the voting eligible population in midterm elections held since 1945

A total of 50.3 percent of eligible voters voted in 2018 (more than 122 million people), compared to a turnout of just 36.0 percent of eligible voters in 2014. The 2018 elections had highest turnout of any mid-term election held since the 1914 elections. Twenty-three states had double-digit percentage-point increases compared to average turnout in midterm elections held between 1982 and 2014. Georgia had the greatest increase over its 1982–2014 midterm average. Its 55% turnout was 21 points higher. Texas had a turnout of 46% which was 14 points higher.

The United States Election Project estimated that 40 million early voters cast ballots before election day, breaking the record for the number of early votes. Some states, such as Texas and Nevada, reported that officials had received more early ballots than the total number of ballots processed in the 2014 midterm election.

== Records and firsts ==
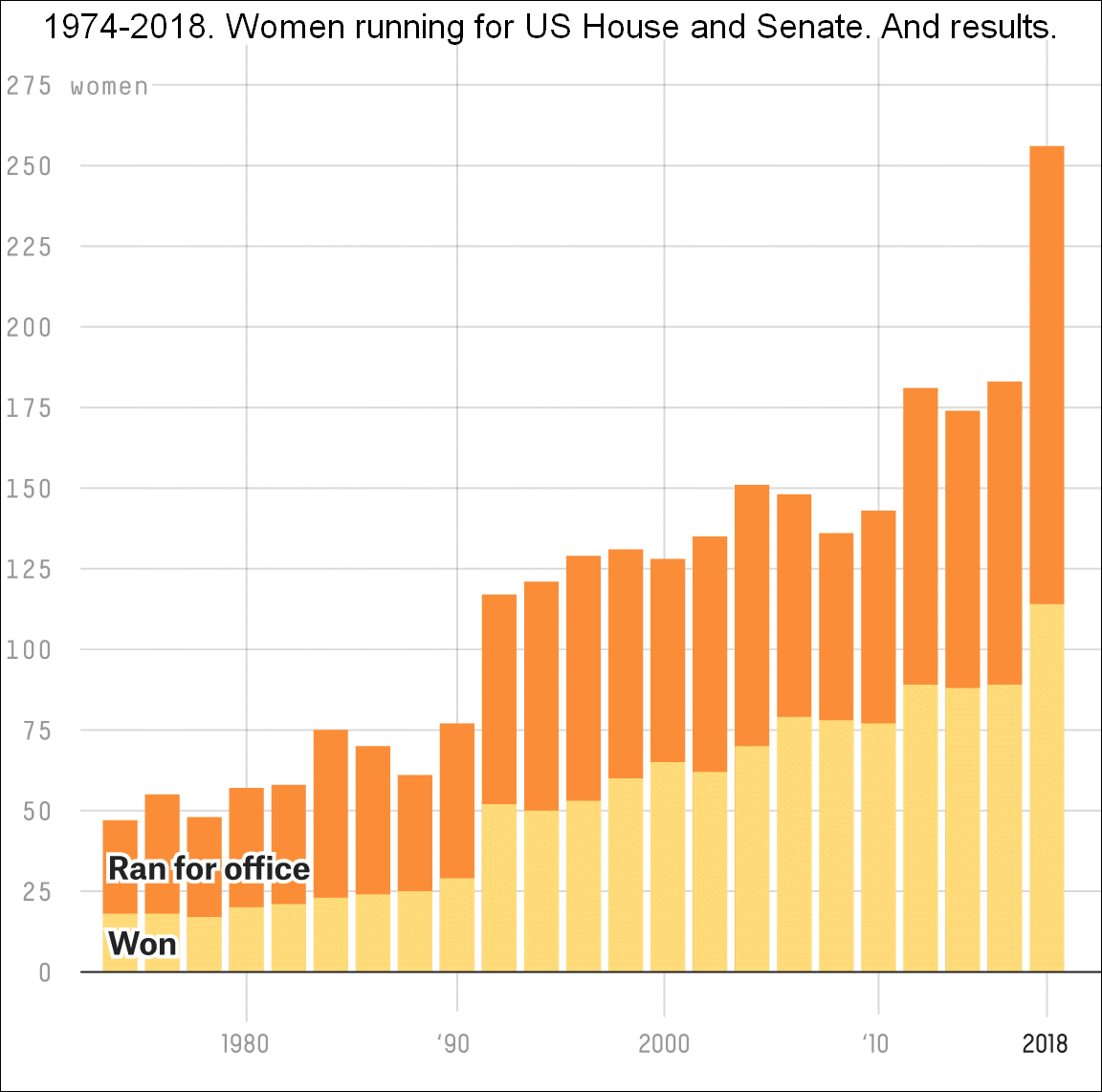
The number of women who sought and won election to Congress in each election cycle from 1974 to 2018

A total of $5.7 billion was spent in the 2018 elections for House and Senate races, the most expensive midterm race ever. The single most expensive race was the Florida U.S. Senate campaign, in which candidates and outside groups spent $209 million to support or oppose Democratic nominee Bill Nelson and Republican nominee Rick Scott, the latter of whom spent over $63 million of his personal fortune on his candidacy.

The 2018 elections saw a number of significant successes for women candidates. Following the 2018 election, there was a record number of women (127) in the 116th Congress, up from 110 in the previous 115th Congress. The share of women members in the 116th is 23.7 percent, up from 20.6 percent. The number of Democratic women in the House increased by 25, while Republican women in the House declined by 10. The number of women in the Senate increased by three, with 2 Democrats and 1 Republican.

The 2018 elections also saw a number of significant successes for LGBT candidates and religious and ethnic minorities. Jared Polis, who was elected governor of Colorado, became the first openly gay man to be elected governor. (Note: Oregon Governor Kate Brown, who is openly bisexual, was the first openly LGBT person to be elected governor, and Jim McGreevey came out as gay while in office as governor of New Jersey.) Ilhan Omar of Minnesota and Rashida Tlaib of Michigan became the first Muslim women elected to the House of Representatives; Ayanna Pressley became the first female African-American Representative from Massachusetts; Sharice Davids of Kansas and Deb Haaland of New Mexico became the first Native American women elected to Congress, and Alexandria Ocasio-Cortez of New York became the youngest-ever female member of the House at age 29. Other candidates failed to achieve historic firsts, including gubernatorial candidates Christine Hallquist (D-VT) and Paulette Jordan (D-ID). Hallquist was the first transgender person to be a major party's nominee for governor and would have been the first transgender governor, but lost to incumbent Republican Phil Scott in the general election, and Jordan, who would have been the first Native American female governor, lost to Republican Brad Little in the general election.

Following the 2018 election, Minnesota became the only state in which each party controlled one chamber of the state legislature, though in Alaska, Republicans controlled one chamber and a cross-party coalition controlled the other. This represented the fewest divided legislatures since the 1914 elections, when there only one state with a divided legislature. Nevada became the first state in U.S. history to have an overall female majority in the state legislature, with women holding 23 of 42 seats in the state Assembly and nine of 21 seats in the state Senate. Women made up the majority of a single state legislative chamber, rather than the entire state legislature, on one previous occasion, in the 2009–2010 New Hampshire State Senate. The 2018 elections also saw Guam elect a female majority to their territorial legislature.

== Ballot controversies and recounts ==
=== Arizona ===
In Arizona, a court settlement was reached on November 9 between Democrats and Republicans after Republicans filed a lawsuit on November 7 to attempt to prevent Maricopa and Pima counties from using procedures that permit mail-in ballot fixes to occur beyond election day. The settlement gave all counties until November 14 to address problems with the ballots for the state's Senate race. Ultimately, Republican candidate Martha McSally conceded the race.

=== Florida ===
Recounts of ballots were ordered for Florida's Senate, governor, and agriculture commissioner races on November 10 after the tallies from 67 counties were deemed too close to call. Due to the recount ordered, Democratic candidate Andrew Gillum withdrew his earlier concession to Republican candidate Ron DeSantis. In total eight lawsuits were filed in the days after November 7. After recounts were held for each race, the Democratic candidates for Senate and governor and the Republican candidate for agriculture commissioner all conceded between November 17 and November 19. On November 19, the Supervisor of Elections for Broward County, Florida, Brenda Snipes, announced her resignation from her post, effective January 4, 2019, after national scrutiny led to widespread condemnation by Republicans.

=== Georgia ===
In Georgia, a judge placed a temporary restraining order on Dougherty County results on November 9 as, among other things, some of the 14,000 absentee ballots were allegedly re-routed through Tallahassee due to Hurricane Michael, resulting in a delay to the county election office certifying its results. On November 17, Georgia Secretary of State Robyn Crittenden certified the election result, a day after the restraining order expired.

Before the election there were allegations of voter suppression raised in Georgia, as well as outcry that candidate Brian Kemp did not resign from his position as secretary of state, which oversaw the election. On November 12, Democratic gubernatorial candidate Stacey Abrams filed a lawsuit to prevent two counties from rejecting absentee ballots with minor mistakes, such as if a voter moved and had not changed their address. During her concession speech on November 16, Abrams announced her plans to file a federal lawsuit challenging the way the state elections were run. She alleged that Kemp used his position of secretary of state and its office to aggressively purge the rolls of inactive voters, enforce an "exact match" policy for checking voters' identities that left many voters in limbo and other measures to tip the election in his favor.

=== North Carolina ===
The North Carolina Board of Elections voted unanimously on December 4 to not certify the congressional race in North Carolina's 9th district after allegations of potential widespread election fraud in the district. The board then declared a public hearing for December 21 to ensure the election was without corruption. The Washington Post reported on December 5 that the board had collected as evidence of election fraud six sworn statements from voters in Bladen County alleging that individuals called on them to pick up their absentee ballots. Incoming Democratic Majority Leader Steny Hoyer announced that the House of Representatives would not seat the apparent winner, Republican Mark Harris, until the fraud investigation had been completed, leaving it vacant at the start of the 116th United States Congress.

After a delay caused by a restructuring of the board, hearings resumed on February 18, 2019. On that day the regulator reported that it had found evidence of "a coordinated, unlawful and substantially resourced absentee ballot scheme" that may have involved more than a thousand ballots or ballot request forms. The board then unanimously voted on February 21, 2019, to call a new election, which was held on September 10, 2019. Harris declined to run in the special election, and the GOP instead nominated Dan Bishop, a Republican state senator. Democratic candidate Dan McCready again sought and received the Democratic nomination. The race was regarded as being a toss-up and a potential bellwether for the 2020 presidential election; Bishop ultimately won by about two percentage points.

== Foreign interference ==
In early 2018, six U.S. intelligence agencies unanimously reported their conclusion that Russian personnel were monitoring American electoral systems and promoting partisan causes on social media. Director of National Intelligence Dan Coats stated during congressional testimony that "the United States [was] under attack" from Russian efforts to impact the results of the elections. United States Secretary of State Mike Pompeo warned in a committee hearing that the federal government was not adequately protected from Russian interference in the 2018 midterm elections, saying: "No responsible government official would ever state that they have done enough to forestall any attack on the United States of America". At the July 2018 Russia–United States Summit, President Trump downplayed the conclusions of the United States Intelligence Community, stating that he believed Russian President Vladimir Putin's repeated denials of interference in American elections. Trump would later accuse China of meddling in the U.S. midterm elections, asserting that "they don't want me or us to win" because of his imposition of tariffs on Chinese goods. In August 2018, Coats and FBI director Christopher Wray announced at a White House press conference that Russia was actively interfering in the 2018 elections.

In July 2018, Democratic senator Claire McCaskill alleged that Russian hackers unsuccessfully attempted to break into her Senate email account. The following month, NPR reported that Democratic senator Jeanne Shaheen from New Hampshire reported to the FBI several attempts to compromise her campaign including both spearphishing attempts on her staff and a disturbing incident where someone called her offices "impersonating a Latvian official, trying to set up a meeting to talk [about] Russian sanctions and about Ukraine". Her opposition to Russian aggression and support of sanctions had placed her on an official Russian blacklist. On August 8, 2018, U.S. Senator Bill Nelson from Florida told the Tampa Bay Times that Russian operatives had penetrated some of Florida's election systems, though he was criticized by The Washington Post's Fact Checker for providing no evidence of Russian hacking. In 2019, Special Counsel Robert Mueller's investigation on Russian interference in the 2016 election concluded "at least one Florida county" was successfully penetrated, and Governor Ron DeSantis said voter databases in two counties had been successfully penetrated.

On December 22, 2018, Coats reported that there was no evidence of vote tampering, but that "influence operations" had persisted. "The activity we did see was consistent with what we shared in the weeks leading up to the election. Russia, and other foreign countries, including China and Iran, conducted influence activities and messaging campaigns targeted at the United States to promote their strategic interests". That same month, Politico reported that the National Republican Congressional Committee had been hacked, though it was unclear which group was responsible for the data breach.

The Voice of America reported in April 2020 that "U.S. intelligence agencies concluded the Chinese hackers meddled in both the 2016 and 2018 elections".

In 2022, it was reported that a Federal Election Commission investigation had found that American Ethane Company, which had received investments from Russian oligarchs, had contributed Russian money to US political candidates in the 2018 midterm elections, largely in Louisiana. FEC commissioners Ellen Weintraub and Shana M. Broussard criticized the Republicans in the FEC for a "slap on the wrist" civil penalty.

== Aftermath and reactions ==
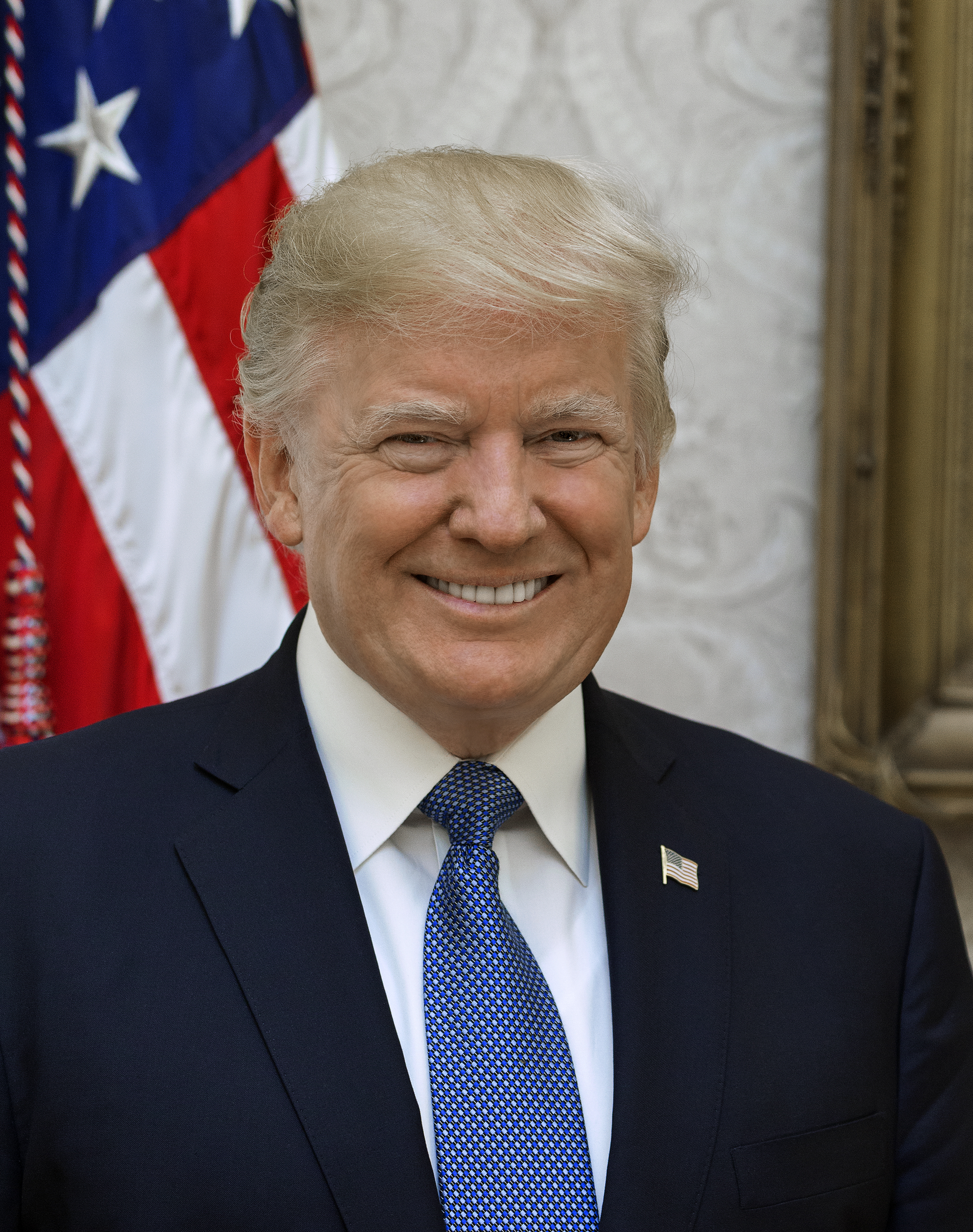
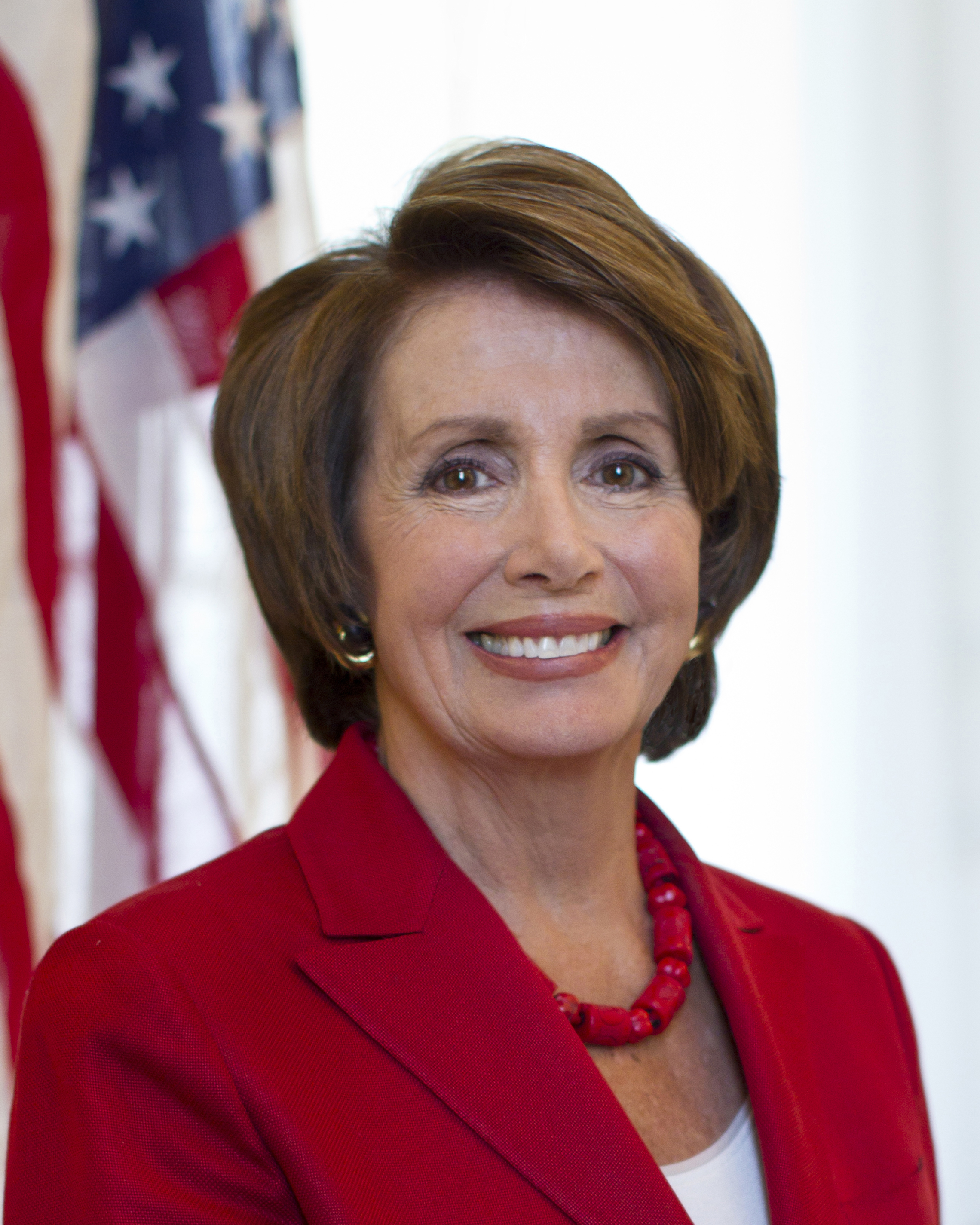
Republican President Donald Trump and Democratic House Minority Leader Nancy Pelosi each declared victory for their respective parties in the 2018 elections.

The Democratic takeover of the House of Representatives gave the Democratic Party the ability to block Republican legislation in the 116th United States Congress, which met from January 2019 to January 2021. The takeover also gave the Democrats control of congressional committees, along with the accompanying power to issue subpoenas and conduct investigations. Continued Republican control of the Senate gave the Republican Party the opportunity to confirm President Trump's nominees without Democratic support. During the 116th Congress, the Republican-controlled Senate confirmed numerous Trump-appointed judges.

After the election, despite the Democratic takeover of the House, President Trump claimed he had won a "big victory". He indicated that he looked forward to "a beautiful bipartisan-type situation" but promised to assume a "warlike posture" if House Democrats launched investigations as attacks on his administration. House Minority Leader Nancy Pelosi asserted that her party won gains because of voter desire to "[restore] the Constitution's checks and balances to the Trump administration". Senate Minority Leader Chuck Schumer said Senate Democrats performed "much better than expected" in a difficult election cycle. Senate Majority Leader Mitch McConnell said election day was "a very good day" for his party.

The election was widely characterized as a "blue wave" election. At the end of election night, Democratic gains in the House appeared modest and the Democratic candidates trailed in Senate races in Arizona and Montana and looked set to make a net loss of as many as four Senate seats, leading some news outlets to characterize the election as a "split decision" whereas other outlets described it as a "blue wave". However, late ballot counting over the next days and weeks found Democrats winning several more seats in the House and the Arizona and Montana Senate elections, leading to a re-evaluation of the initial election night analyses. One week after the election, Nathaniel Rakich of FiveThirtyEight said the election was "by any historical standard, a blue wave". Two weeks after the election, Nate Silver of FiveThirtyEight wrote: "There shouldn't be much question about whether 2018 was a wave election. Of course it was a wave". It was third-largest midterm change of seats for either party in the House in the post-Watergate era, and the largest Democratic House gain since 1974. In Ohio and North Carolina, Democrats failed to pick up a single seat despite winning close to half the vote. While Democrats won almost half the vote in Ohio, they only won a quarter of its House elections. The New York Times asserted that gerrymandering affected the outcomes of races in those states. Democrats also made among the largest gains in House seats in Pennsylvania, where the state Supreme Court had struck down a heavily gerrymandered map that favored Republicans.

Research has found that Republicans who voted for the repeal of the Affordable Care Act got lower vote shares in the 2018 election. Studies also show that Trump's implementation of tariffs that adversely affected the U.S. economy adversely affected Republican outcomes in the 2018 election. Racism and sexism was a stronger predictor of the vote in the House than it had been in the 2016 election, as less sexist and less racist voters switched from the Republican Party to the Democratic Party.

== Table of state, territorial and federal results ==
This table shows the partisan results of Congressional, gubernatorial and state legislative races held in each state and territories in 2018. Note that not all states and territories held gubernatorial, state legislative, and United States Senate elections in 2018—the territories and Washington, D.C., do not elect members of the United States Senate. Washington, D.C., and the five inhabited territories each elect one non-voting member of the United States House of Representatives. Nebraska's unicameral legislature and the governorship and legislature of American Samoa are officially non-partisan. Several seats in the House of Representatives were vacant at the time of the election.

Subdivision and PVI		Before 2018 elections				After 2018 elections			
Subdivision	PVI	Governor	State leg.	U.S. Senate	U.S. House	Governor	State leg.	U.S. Senate	U.S. House
Alabama	R+14	Rep	Rep	Split	Rep 6–1	Rep	Rep	Split	Rep 6–1
Alaska	R+9	Ind	Split	Rep	Rep 1–0	Rep	Split	Rep	Rep 1–0
Arizona	R+5	Rep	Rep	Rep	Rep 5–4	Rep	Rep	Split	Dem 5–4
Arkansas	R+15	Rep	Rep	Rep	Rep 4–0	Rep	Rep	Rep	Rep 4–0
California	D+12	Dem	Dem	Dem	Dem 39–14	Dem	Dem	Dem	Dem 46–7
Colorado	D+1	Dem	Split	Split	Rep 4–3	Dem	Dem	Split	Dem 4–3
Connecticut	D+6	Dem	Split	Dem	Dem 5–0	Dem	Dem	Dem	Dem 5–0
Delaware	D+6	Dem	Dem	Dem	Dem 1–0	Dem	Dem	Dem	Dem 1–0
Florida	R+2	Rep	Rep	Split	Rep 15–11	Rep	Rep	Rep	Rep 14–13
Georgia	R+5	Rep	Rep	Rep	Rep 10–4	Rep	Rep	Rep	Rep 9–5
Hawaii	D+18	Dem	Dem	Dem	Dem 2–0	Dem	Dem	Dem	Dem 2–0
Idaho	R+19	Rep	Rep	Rep	Rep 2–0	Rep	Rep	Rep	Rep 2–0
Illinois	D+7	Rep	Dem	Dem	Dem 11–7	Dem	Dem	Dem	Dem 13–5
Indiana	R+9	Rep	Rep	Split	Rep 7–2	Rep	Rep	Rep	Rep 7–2
Iowa	R+3	Rep	Rep	Rep	Rep 3–1	Rep	Rep	Rep	Dem 3–1
Kansas	R+13	Rep	Rep	Rep	Rep 4–0	Dem	Rep	Rep	Rep 3–1
Kentucky	R+15	Rep	Rep	Rep	Rep 5–1	Rep	Rep	Rep	Rep 5–1
Louisiana	R+11	Dem	Rep	Rep	Rep 5–1	Dem	Rep	Rep	Rep 5–1
Maine	D+3	Rep	Split	Split R/I (Note: One of Maine's senators, Susan Collins, is a Republican. The other senator from Maine, Angus King, is an independent who has caucused with the Democrats since taking office in 2013.)	Split 1–1	Dem	Dem	Split R/I	Dem 2–0
Maryland	D+12	Rep	Dem	Dem	Dem 7–1	Rep	Dem	Dem	Dem 7–1
Massachusetts	D+12	Rep	Dem	Dem	Dem 9–0	Rep	Dem	Dem	Dem 9–0
Michigan	D+1	Rep	Rep	Dem	Rep 9–4	Dem	Rep	Dem	Split 7–7
Minnesota	D+1	Dem	Rep	Dem	Dem 5–3	Dem	Split	Dem	Dem 5–3
Mississippi	R+9	Rep	Rep	Rep	Rep 3–1	Rep	Rep	Rep	Rep 3–1
Missouri	R+9	Rep	Rep	Split	Rep 6–2	Rep	Rep	Rep	Rep 6–2
Montana	R+11	Dem	Rep	Split	Rep 1–0	Dem	Rep	Split	Rep 1–0
Nebraska	R+14	Rep	NP	Rep	Rep 3–0	Rep	NP	Rep	Rep 3–0
Nevada	D+1	Rep	Dem	Split	Dem 3–1	Dem	Dem	Dem	Dem 3–1
New Hampshire	Even	Rep	Rep	Dem	Dem 2–0	Rep	Dem	Dem	Dem 2–0
New Jersey	D+7	Dem	Dem	Dem	Dem 7–5	Dem	Dem	Dem	Dem 11–1
New Mexico	D+3	Rep	Dem	Dem	Dem 2–1	Dem	Dem	Dem	Dem 3–0
New York	D+11	Dem	Split	Dem	Dem 17–9	Dem	Dem	Dem	Dem 21–6
North Carolina	R+3	Dem	Rep	Rep	Rep 10–3	Dem	Rep	Rep	Rep 9–3 (Note: Due to fraud allegations, the results for the North Carolina's 9th congressional district election were declared void, and the seat remained vacant at the start of the 116th United States Congress. A new special election will be held in 2019 to fill the seat.)
North Dakota	R+17	Rep	Rep	Split	Rep 1–0	Rep	Rep	Rep	Rep 1–0
Ohio	R+3	Rep	Rep	Split	Rep 12–4	Rep	Rep	Split	Rep 12–4
Oklahoma	R+20	Rep	Rep	Rep	Rep 4–0	Rep	Rep	Rep	Rep 4–1
Oregon	D+5	Dem	Dem	Dem	Dem 4–1	Dem	Dem	Dem	Dem 4–1
Pennsylvania	Even	Dem	Rep	Split	Rep 12–6	Dem	Rep	Split	Split 9–9
Rhode Island	D+10	Dem	Dem	Dem	Dem 2–0	Dem	Dem	Dem	Dem 2–0
South Carolina	R+8	Rep	Rep	Rep	Rep 6–1	Rep	Rep	Rep	Rep 5–2
South Dakota	R+14	Rep	Rep	Rep	Rep 1–0	Rep	Rep	Rep	Rep 1–0
Tennessee	R+14	Rep	Rep	Rep	Rep 7–2	Rep	Rep	Rep	Rep 7–2
Texas	R+8	Rep	Rep	Rep	Rep 25–11	Rep	Rep	Rep	Rep 23–13
Utah	R+20	Rep	Rep	Rep	Rep 4–0	Rep	Rep	Rep	Rep 3–1
Vermont	D+15	Rep	Dem	Split D/I (Note: One of Vermont's senators, Patrick Leahy, is a Democrat. The other senator from Vermont, Bernie Sanders, was elected as an independent and has caucused with the Democrats since taking office in 2007.)	Dem 1–0	Rep	Dem	Split D/I	Dem 1–0
Virginia	D+1	Dem	Rep	Dem	Rep 7–4	Dem	Rep	Dem	Dem 7–4
Washington	D+7	Dem	Dem	Dem	Dem 6–4	Dem	Dem	Dem	Dem 7–3
West Virginia	R+20	Rep	Rep	Split	Rep 2–0	Rep	Rep	Split	Rep 3–0
Wisconsin	Even	Rep	Rep	Split	Rep 5–3	Dem	Rep	Split	Rep 5–3
Wyoming	R+25	Rep	Rep	Rep	Rep 1–0	Rep	Rep	Rep	Rep 1–0
United States	Even	Rep 33–16–1	Rep 31–13–5	Rep 51–49 (Note: The Democratic Senate caucus consisted of 47 Democrats and 2 independents prior to the 2018 elections and 45 Democrats and two independents after the elections.)	Rep 235–193	Rep 27–23	Rep 29–18–2	Rep 53–47	Dem 235–199
Washington, D.C.	D+43	Dem (Note: Washington, D.C. does not elect a governor or state legislature, but it does elect a mayor and a city council.)	Dem	—N/a	Dem	Dem	Dem	—N/a	Dem
American Samoa	—N/a	NP/D (Note: Although elections for governor of American Samoa are non-partisan, Governor Lolo Matalasi Moliga has affiliated with the Democratic Party at the national level since re-election in 2016.)	NP	—N/a	Rep	NP/D	NP	—N/a	Rep
Guam	—N/a	Rep	Dem	—N/a	Dem	Dem	Dem	—N/a	Dem
N. Mariana Islands	—N/a	Rep	Rep	—N/a	Ind (Note: Delegate Gregorio Sablan was elected as an independent, but he has caucused with the Democrats since taking office in 2009.)	Rep	Rep	—N/a	Ind
Puerto Rico	—N/a	PNP/D (Note: Puerto Rican Governor Ricardo Rosselló was elected as a member of the New Progressive Party and affiliates with the Democratic Party at the national level.)	PNP	—N/a	PNP/R (Note: Puerto Rico's Resident Commissioner, Jenniffer González, was elected as a member of the New Progressive Party and has caucused with the Republicans since taking office in 2017.)	PNP/D	PNP	—N/a	PNP/R
U.S. Virgin Islands	—N/a	Ind	Dem	—N/a	Dem	Dem	Dem	—N/a	Dem
Subdivision	PVI	Governor	State leg.	U.S. Senate	U.S. House	Governor	State leg.	U.S. Senate	U.S. House
Subdivision and PVI		Before 2018 elections				After 2018 elections			

== Election night television viewership ==
Legend

cable news network
broadcast network

Total television viewers
8:00 to 11:00 PM Eastern

Network	Viewers
FNC	7,784,000
NBC	5,690,000
ABC	5,264,000
CNN	5,070,000
MSNBC	4,479,000
CBS	3,897,000

Television viewers 25 to 54
8:00 to 11:00 PM Eastern

Network	Viewers
CNN	2,573,000
FNC	2,392,000
NBC	2,282,000
ABC	1,957,000
MSNBC	1,354,000
CBS	1,296,000
