= Let's Move Nashville =

Referendum on constructing a mass transit system

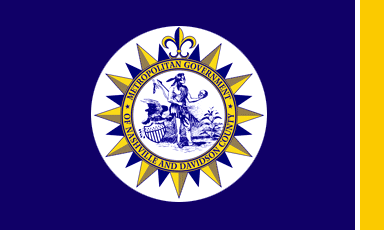
- May 1, 2018
- Transit Improvement Program Referendum Election
- Website: letsmovenashville.com

Results
Choice	Votes	%
Yes	44,766	36.03%
No	79,493	63.97%
- Precinct results No 80–90% 70–80% 60–70% 50–60% Yes 70–80% 60–70% 50–60% No data

Let's Move Nashville was a local referendum in Nashville, Tennessee, on May 1, 2018, that would have funded the construction of a mass transit system under the Nashville Metropolitan Transit Authority in Davidson County. The $8.9 billion plan would have included several light rail and bus rapid transit lines along major corridors, to be built between 2018 and 2032. The plan was proposed in 2017 by Mayor Megan Barry under the Tennessee IMPROVE Act and supported by some Nashville politicians and businesses.

The plan would have included 26 miles (42 km) of light rail and 25 miles (40 km) of bus rapid transit, as well as additional funding for local buses and the existing Music City Star commuter rail line. The light rail element of the plan would have been built in phases between 2026 and 2032, while the bus rapid transit lines would open in 2023. The plan was defeated in part due to an opposition campaign organized by Americans for Prosperity.

== Background ==
Nashville's first streetcars debuted in 1866 and were pulled by mules and horses along short lines within the city operated by private companies. After a short period where steam-powered streetcars were used by the companies, Nashville's first electric streetcars began service in 1889. The city's 52 miles (84 km) of streetcar tracks were absorbed into the Nashville Railway and Light Company after 1900, and the company was acquired by the Tennessee Electric Power Company (TEPCO) in 1930. TEPCO introduced buses to replace the streetcars in the late 1930s, resulting in discontinuation of streetcar service in 1941. TEPCO's transportation operations were reorganized into the Nashville Transit Company and acquired by the government of Nashville and Davidson County in 1973, forming the modern Nashville Metropolitan Transit Authority. A separate organization, the Regional Transportation Authority of Middle Tennessee (RTA), was formed in 1988 to oversee the planning of a regional transit system and began operating the Music City Star commuter rail line between Nashville and Lebanon in 2006.

The Nashville Area Chamber of Commerce began exploring a potential transit plan in 2009, including trips to Denver to study the FasTracks transit program. The MTA had already begun planning for an east–west bus rapid transit line in 2008, and unveiled the "Amp" in 2012. The line would have been 7.1 miles (11.4 km) long and run from the West End to Downtown Nashville and East Nashville along Main Street, Broadway, and West End Avenue. The project's use of exclusive bus lanes and $174 million cost generated public opposition and a proposed bill that would allow the state legislature to veto bus rapid transit projects. The project was shelved by the MTA in early 2015, with the agency preparing a scaled-down version of bus rapid transit for other corridors.

== History ==
The MTA and RTA began work on a strategic plan, named "nMotion", in April 2015 as a sub-component of the county government's NashvilleNext comprehensive plan, which prioritized development of a regional transit system. The final nMotion plan was published in August 2016 and recommended a $6 billion light rail, bus, and commuter rail system for the Middle Tennessee region. The final plan was adopted by the MTA and RTA boards the following month.

At the beginning of the 2017 legislative session, Governor Bill Haslam proposed a statewide transportation plan that included authorization for municipalities to hold referendums on funding transit plans with a local sales tax increase. The plan, later named the "IMPROVE Act", was introduced in the state legislature in March and was passed the following month by large margins in the House and Senate. The IMPROVE Act was signed on April 26 by Governor Haslam, paving the way for a transit referendum in Nashville. Nashville Mayor Megan Barry, a supporter of the IMPROVE Act, had proposed a 2018 referendum on transit and named Gallatin Pike as one of the light rail corridors in early 2017.

The "Let's Move Nashville" plan was unveiled by Mayor Megan Barry in October 2017, outlining five corridors for light rail and four corridors for bus rapid transit. After a series of community meetings and public hearings, a revised version of the plan with an extended Charlotte Avenue light rail line was adopted in December. The referendum was formally placed on the May 1 ballot by a 34–2 vote of the Metropolitan Council on February 6, 2018, using a $5.4 billion figure instead of an $8.9 billion figure that accounted for inflation and interest.

== Projects ==
Proposed light rail (in red) and bus rapid transit (blue) routes in the Let's Move Nashville plan

The Let's Move Nashville plan included 26 miles (42 km) of light rail on five corridors, converging in a downtown tunnel, and 25 miles (40 km) of bus rapid transit. The first projects would have been completed in 2019, with the first light rail line opening in 2026 and the last projects finished in 2032. The plan forecast total system ridership of between 114,500 and 131,000 by 2040, with 61,000 to 71,000 daily riders on the light rail lines and 53,500 to 60,000 additional passengers on improved bus routes.

The projects were wholly within Nashville and Davidson County, with outlying areas expected to use express buses and park and ride lots to transfer to the light rail and rapid bus system. Some outlying counties are allowed to hold their own transit referendums under the IMPROVE Act, which could have included expansion of Nashville's system into the suburbs.

=== Light rail ===
The light rail system would have been centered around a 1.8-mile (2.9 km) tunnel under 5th Avenue in Downtown Nashville, to open in 2027 with three stations: at the existing Music City Central bus terminal, at Broadway near Bridgestone Arena, and at Lafayette Street. The outer segments of the light rail network would have generally used dedicated lanes on city roads, with transit signal priority at intersections. Stations would have been spaced approximately 1/2-mile (0.8 km) apart and included two-car platforms; some stations would have also had park and ride facilities and transit centers served by buses. Light rail trains would have run from 5 a.m. to 1 a.m. on weekdays and 6 a.m. to 10 p.m. on weekends, at frequencies of 10 to 30 minutes.

The following light rail corridors would have opened between 2026 and 2032:

- Gallatin Pike to Briley Parkway in East Nashville
- Charlotte Avenue to White Bridge Pike
- Freight rail tracks from Charlotte Avenue to Tennessee State University and Buchanan Street
- Murfreesboro Road to Nashville International Airport
- Nolensville Road to Harding Place

=== Bus rapid transit ===
The plan's four bus rapid transit lines would have used dedicated bus lanes and transit signal priority in some segments, with stations approximately 1/2-mile (0.8 km) apart. Fare payment would have been conducted off-board and stations would have real-time information signage and other features.

The following corridors were considered for bus rapid transit service, to open in 2023:

- Bordeaux via Clarksville Pike
- West End Avenue to White Bridge Road and Charlotte Avenue
- Hillsboro Road to The Mall at Green Hills
- Dickerson Pike to Briley Parkway

=== Other projects ===
The plan also included funding for improved service hours on existing high-ridership bus routes, to be implemented in late 2018, followed by frequent and crosstown bus routes in 2019. The first of 19 new neighborhood transit centers would have opened in 2019, featuring passenger waiting shelters, ticket vending machines, digital boarding information, and climate control. Under the plan, buses would have been replaced with an all-electric fleet that comes equipped with on-board Wi-Fi and other features. The plan also included funding for new sidewalks and bike lanes throughout Nashville. The Music City Star commuter train would have also seen additional service hours funded by the plan after 2031.

== Funding ==
The Let's Move Nashville plan was estimated to cost $5.2 billion in 2018 dollars, corrected to $8.95 billion after inflation and interest when including operations and maintenance over 14 years. The program would have been funded primarily by a 0.5 percent sales tax increase, bringing the total sales tax within Nashville and Davidson County to 10.25 percent; the transit sales tax would have been increased to one percent in 2023 and expire in 2060 after the repayment of bonds. Additional revenue sources include a 0.25 percent hotel tax (graduating to 0.375 percent in 2023), a 20 percent surcharge on the existing rental car tax, a 20 percent surcharge on an existing business and excise tax, and bond proceeds. All tax increases would roll back by 2068.

Of the $8.95 billion in funding for the plan, over 61 percent ($5.4 billion) would have been spent on light rail construction. $1.1 billion would have been used on buses, $934 million would have been appropriated for operations and maintenance, and $1.2 billion would have been used for debt repayment and interest.

== Political debate ==
=== Supporters ===
Transit for Nashville, a coalition of 40 local organizations, launched in September 2017 to support the transit referendum. The yes campaign's political action committee, Citizens for Greater Mobility, raised a total of $2.5 million by early April and $2.9 million by election day, primarily from developers, construction firms, and engineering companies. Among the major local donors were large employers like Vanderbilt University and Medical Center, Bridgestone Americas, Community Health Systems, HCA Healthcare, and Ingram Industries. The Nashville Predators organization also announced their endorsement of the transit plan in December 2017. The transit plan was endorsed by Mayor Barry, 21 members of the Metro Council, and the Greater Nashville Regional Council. The editorial boards of The Tennessean and Nashville Business Journal also endorsed the plan in April.

The transit plan was a major part of Mayor Barry's agenda and part of her election campaign in 2015. In early January, Barry became embroiled in a scandal involving an extramarital affair with the head of her security detail and the related misuse of government funds, and stepped down as a spokesperson for the yes campaign. Her guilty plea and resignation from office in early March removed her from the campaign entirely, leaving acting mayor David Briley and Davidson County clerk Brenda Wynn as the campaign's lead spokespeople. Despite fears that Mayor Barry's scandals would hinder support for the transit referendum, a poll conducted by iCitizen after her resignation stated that 95 percent of respondents had not changed their opinion on the referendum. Ahead of the referendum, Mayor Briley unveiled a "Declaration of Transportation Independence" on April 2, listing transportation goals for the city with a focus on non-car modes.

=== Opposition ===
An opposition group named "No Tax 4 Tracks" was formed in January 2018 and opened a political action committee to solicit funds for the no campaign. David Fox, a mayoral candidate who lost in the 2015 election to Barry, lent his support to the opposition campaign. The group raised a total of $1.15 million, including $949,000 in its first three months, primarily from a $750,000 donation from a non-profit organization named Nashville Smart, Inc. The organization, formed in December 2017, declined to disclose its donors and was scrutinized by the yes campaign, who accused Nashville Smart of being funded by the Koch Brothers' Americans for Prosperity. Americans for Prosperity also denied its involvement in the campaign, but later began funding mailed advertisements in late April. No Tax 4 Tracks has also been criticized for using misleading or inaccurate information in its newspaper and television advertisements, some of which were retracted.

A related group, Better Transit for Nashville, submitted an op-ed piece to The Tennessean in April that was allegedly written by a spokesperson named Matt Johnson, including a picture. The newspaper retracted the opinion article after it had been revealed that the group used a fake picture to identify Johnson, determined to be a fake persona. The same group was later criticized for equating a recent mass shooting in Nashville to an alleged uptick in crime due to the construction of mass transit.

A housing and tenants' rights group, the People's Alliance for Transit, Housing and Employment (PATHE), stated their opposition to the transit plan on the grounds of equity for low-income Nashvillians, claiming that transit projects and gentrification would displace residents.

A survey of Metro Council members by The Tennessean in April found 11 members opposed to the transit plan. An anti-transit member of the Metro Council, Robert Swope, also proposed automated buses and three double-decker freeways as an alternative to the transit plan. Among the 13 candidates for the May 24 mayoral election, all but acting mayor (and eventual winner) David Briley stated their opposition to the transit plan.

=== Opinion polling ===
A telephone poll conducted by Mayor Barry's campaign committee in October 2017 found 57 percent of respondents were in support of funding a transit plan using various new taxes, while 37 percent were opposed. A poll conducted in early March 2018 by Vanderbilt University from a pool of 723 registered voters found 42 percent of respondents in support of the transit plan and 28 percent in opposition.

== Results ==
Let's Move Nashville Transit Improvement Program Referendum Election, May 1, 2018
Choice	Votes	%
For	44,766	36.03
Against	79,493	63.97
Required majority		50
Total	124,259	100.00
Source: Davidson County Election Commission

Early voting for the referendum resulted in over 59,000 votes being cast between April 11 and 26, exceeding turnout expectations. The Davidson County Election Commission projected that over 100,000 residents would vote on the referendum, which would have made it one of the largest in Nashville's history. The referendum was decided during the May 1 election, which also included primaries for local races, at 160 voting locations in Davidson County; ballots for the transit referendum were separated from the Democratic and Republican primaries. The referendum's result was predicted to depend on the votes of Nashville's African American population, with both campaigns conducting targeted outreach of African American voters during early voting.

In early voting, the "no" vote took a 2-to-1 lead. Shortly after polls closed on May 1, the pro-transit campaign issued a statement conceding defeat. In total, over 124,000 votes were cast in the election, of which nearly 80,000 were against the transit plan. Votes in favor of the referendum carried majorities in only five of the 35 Metro Council districts, and most support was concentrated in downtown and close-in neighborhoods that had experienced recent gentrification. The result was blamed on the choice of an off-election with low turnout, as well as inconsistent messages from the pro-transit campaign that was managed by a controversial local public relations firm with ties to past mayoral administrations.

== Aftermath ==
Mayor Briley stated that the city government would submit a revised plan after the IMPROVE Act's mandatory one-year waiting period, likely in 2020. Proponents later stated that a new referendum is proposed to take place in 2024. Pro-transit campaigners called the result a "fatal blow" to the city's bid for Amazon HQ2, for which Nashville had made the 20-city shortlist. No Tax 4 Tracks, the opposition PAC, called the election an "exceptional moment in Nashville history" and stated that the group would remain active in shaping a future transit plan. A case study published by TransitCenter in early 2020 concluded that the plan was too large and too reliant on the chamber of commerce for pro-side messaging.

A new transit plan, estimated to cost $1.5 billion over 10 years, was proposed by mayor John Cooper in August 2020. The plan relied heavily on improving bus service, including a bus rapid transit system and several new transit centers, rather than focusing on light rail.

In 2023, Freddie O'Connell was elected mayor of Nashville on a platform of expanding public transit. His administration's $3.1 billion transit plan, "Choose How You Move," was part of a referendum on the Davidson County ballot in 2024. The plan passed with 66% voter approval.

== See also ==
- 2018 Nashville mayoral special election
- 2023 Nashville mayoral election
