= Carol M. Swain =

American political scientist (born 1954)

Carol Swain
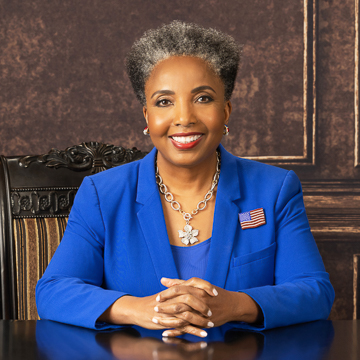
- Swain in 2022
- Born: March 7, 1954 (age 72); Bedford, Virginia, U.S.
- Political party: Republican
- Children: 3

Academic background
- Education: Virginia Western Community College (AA); Roanoke College (BA); Virginia Tech (MA); University of North Carolina, Chapel Hill (PhD); Yale University (MLS)
- Thesis: The Politics of Black Representation in U.S. Congressional Districts (1989)

Academic work
- Discipline: Political science
- Institutions: Duke University (1989–1990); Princeton University (1990–1999); Vanderbilt University (1999–2017)
- Notable students: Jared Polis
- Website: Official website

Carol Miller Swain (born March 7, 1954) is a conservative American political scientist and legal scholar who is a retired professor of political science and law at Vanderbilt University. She is a frequent television analyst and has authored and edited several books. Her interests include race relations, immigration, representation, evangelical politics, and the United States constitution.

== Early life and education ==
Carol Miller Swain was born on March 7, 1954, in Bedford, Virginia, the second of twelve children. Her father dropped out of school in the third grade and her mother dropped out in high school. Her stepfather used to physically abuse her mother, Dorothy Henderson, who is disabled due to polio. Swain grew up in poverty, living in a shack without running water, and sharing two beds with her eleven siblings. She did not finish high school, dropping out in ninth grade. She moved to Roanoke with her family in the 1960s and appealed to a judge to be transferred to a foster home, which was denied. Swain instead lived with her grandmother in a trailer park.

After she divorced in 1975, Swain earned a GED and worked as a cashier at McDonald's, a door-to-door salesperson, and an assistant in a retirement facility. She later earned an associate degree from Virginia Western Community College. She went on to earn a B.A., magna cum laude, in criminal justice from Roanoke College and a master's degree in political science from Virginia Tech. While an undergraduate at Roanoke College, she organized a scholarship fund for black students that by 2002 had an endowment of $350,000. She finished a Ph.D. in political science from the University of North Carolina at Chapel Hill in 1989. In 2000, she earned a Master of Legal Studies from Yale Law School.

== Career ==
=== Academia ===
Swain received tenure as an associate professor of politics and public policy at Princeton University. From 1999 to 2017, she taught political science and law at Vanderbilt University. She retired from her post at Vanderbilt in 2017.

=== Author ===
Harvard University Press published Swain's first academic book, Black Faces, Black Interests: The Representation of African Americans in Congress in 1993. It received the D.B. Hardeman Prize and the American Political Science Association's Woodrow Wilson Foundation Award. Swain later accused deposed Harvard President Claudine Gay of plagiarizing portions of her book, stating, "Maybe she didn’t know any better, but it would qualify as plagiarism under Harvard’s own rules." In 2024, Swain released A Gay Affair, published by Be the People Books. This book followed Claudine Gay's resignation as President of Harvard on January 2, 2024.

In 2003, Swain edited Contemporary Voices of White Nationalism with Russell K. Nieli. The book contains telephone interviews with ten people active in the white nationalist movement, which were edited by the interviewees. Stephanie Shanks-Meile, reviewing the book for Contemporary Sociology, criticized the book's methodology as "weak", and the choice of interviewees as "no real substitution for field research, making Swain and Nieli's ten telephone interviews… too superficial to base an entire study on white nationalism."

Her third book, published in 2002, was The New White Nationalism in America: Its Challenge to Integration, which one reviewer described as "a gallant attempt to locate the middle ground of American values and social discourse toward resolving contemporary racial problems, however, complex social issues remain unresolved and out of focus". Her methodology was criticized by political scientist Mark Q. Sawyer.

In 2011, Swain released Be the People: A Call to Reclaim America's Faith and Promise, published by Thomas Nelson. Between October 2012 and July 2014 she hosted a weekly television talk show by the same name on WSMV-TV and WZTV.

Swain has participated in conferences and radio programs organized by the Family Research Council (FRC), the Tea Party movement, and The Heritage Foundation.

In November 2015, Vanderbilt University students started a petition asking university administrators to halt Swain's teaching and require her to attend diversity training sessions. The students accused Swain of becoming "synonymous with bigotry, intolerance, and unprofessionalism". Swain responded by calling the students "sad and pathetic, in the sense that they're college students and they should be open to hearing more than one viewpoint." The petition garnered over 1,000 signatures within days, before changing to asking administrators to only suspend Swain and require all professors to attend diversity training. In response, a pro-Swain petition was started by her supporters, who suggested the student petition was "reminiscent of China's Cultural Revolution, when student Red Guards made false and ridiculous accusations against their professors". Nicholas S. Zeppos, chancellor of Vanderbilt University, issued a statement saying that while Swain's views are not the same as the university's, the university is committed to free speech and academic freedom.

In January 2017, Swain announced that she would retire from Vanderbilt in August, saying, "I will not miss what American universities have allowed themselves to become". After a series of racial protests erupted in the summer of 2017, an article in The Weekly Standard dubbed Swain "the Cassandra of Vanderbilt".

Swain served on the Tennessee Advisory Committee to the U.S. Civil Rights Commission, and was appointed by President George W. Bush to a National Council on the Humanities term ending January 26, 2014. She also served on the Board of Trustees of her alma mater, Roanoke College, and is a foundation member of the Nu of Virginia Chapter of Phi Beta Kappa.

Swain was co-chairwoman for President Donald Trump's 1776 Commission, which released its report in January 2021 as a response to The New York Times Magazine's 1619 Project. The commission called for patriotic education and criticized liberals for "left-wing indoctrination in our schools." The report was condemned by historians who noted that there were no professional historians of the United States on the commission.

=== Political career ===
Swain was a Democrat before leaving the party in 2009 due to what she said was her Christian faith causing her to reexamine her worldview. In 2009, Swain became a Republican.

Swain supported Donald Trump's 2016 campaign for president.

Following Nashville Mayor Megan Barry's resignation for embezzlement on March 6, 2018, a special election was triggered. Swain declared her candidacy for Mayor of Nashville on April 2, citing a need for low taxes and common-sense regulations. She placed second in the election, receiving 23 percent of the vote, behind acting mayor David Briley, who received 54 percent.

On March 18, 2019, Swain announced that she was again running for Nashville mayor, challenging incumbent mayor Briley in that year's election. The election results on August 1, 2019, had her in third place with 21% of the vote, ahead of Tennessee House of Representatives member John Ray Clemmons, but behind Councilman John Cooper (36%) and incumbent David Briley (26%), setting the latter two for a special run-off election.

== Views ==
=== Race ===
In 2002, Swain argued against reparations for American descendants of slaves during an event at Delaware State University, a historically black university. In 2005, she called for President George W. Bush to issue a formal apology to African Americans for the institution of slavery. She also wrote a policy document on the subject for the Heartland Institute. When an apology was eventually issued in 2009, during the presidency of Barack Obama, she called it "meaningless" and expressed disappointment that it did not happen under the previous president, a Republican, as "it would have shed that racist scab on the party."

In October 2009, the Southern Poverty Law Center (SPLC) mentioned Swain in a critique of A Conversation About Race, a documentary directed by Craig Bodeker that contends that racism is not an issue in America. The SPLC stated that the film had been well-received among white supremacist organizations, and that the film's director gave interviews to white supremacist publications to promote it. The SPLC noted that Swain was one of the few mainstream figures who had endorsed the film. Swain stated that the content of the film could be effectively used in social science classes to encourage debate, called the SPLC article a smear, and claimed that the SPLC was retaliating against her for past criticism of the organization.

Swain called the re-election of President Barack Obama in 2012 "a very scary situation". She argued that civil rights leaders like Jesse Jackson and Al Sharpton had used the killing of Trayvon Martin to increase voter registration for the Democratic Party, and argued that black-on-white crimes are underreported in the media. She also criticized Martin's mother for failing to address the issues of black-on-black crime rates, unemployment, and abortion in black communities.

In July 2016, Swain criticized Black Lives Matter, stating it was "a Marxist organization" and "a very destructive force in America." She reiterated that it was "pure Marxism" and concluded that it "needs to go". In October 2020, a video recording was released which showed her comparing Black Lives Matter to the Ku Klux Klan.

In August 2016, Swain appeared in Hillary's America: The Secret History of the Democratic Party, directed by Dinesh D'Souza.

=== Islam ===
On January 16, 2015, in the wake of the Charlie Hebdo shooting, Swain wrote an op-ed criticizing Islam in The Tennessean. She argued that "Islam is not like other religions in the United States… it poses an absolute danger to us and our children unless it is monitored. […] If America is to be safe, it must… institute serious monitoring of Islamic organizations."

Following her comments, a student protest was held at Vanderbilt University, accusing Swain of engaging in "hate speech" and asking that the university implements policies to protect students "from being attacked by faculty members."

On January 19, Judson Phillips, a conservative activist, wrote an op-ed in The Washington Times in defense of Swain's remarks. The same day, Vanderbilt professor David J. Wasserstein published his piece, "Thoughtful views on Islam needed, not simplicity", in the Tennessean, criticising her remarks. On January 23, 2015, The Tennessean published another opinion piece, titled "Anti-Islam op-ed distorts reality, could harm people," by Randy Horick.

In February 2015, Swain filed a police complaint after she received a package with lewd sexual contents and messages from an address in Portland, Oregon in retaliation for her op-ed. She commented that she no longer felt safe on the campus of Vanderbilt University.

== Personal life ==
Swain married at the age of sixteen and had two sons and one daughter. Her daughter died of sudden infant death syndrome. Upon being divorced five years later, Swain attempted to commit suicide by swallowing pills. During this period she was a Jehovah's Witness. According to the Nashville Scene, "As a young girl, Swain became a devout Jehovah's Witness. At the time, many in that church believed that the world would end in 1975. Swain was among them."

In 1998 Swain was baptized into the Pentecostal faith after hearing an "internal voice" when she thought she was dying at a hospital. In 2017 Swain served as a Citizen's Committee member for the 43rd Annual Tennessee Prayer Breakfast and as a board member for the Nashville Youth for Christ. She is a Southern Baptist and lives in Nashville, Tennessee.

== Publications ==
=== Books ===
Listed chronologically by released date.

- Carol M. Swain (1993). Black Faces, Black Interests: The Representation of African Americans in Congress. Harvard University Press. ISBN 978-0-674-07616-7.
- ——— (1996). Race Versus Class: The New Affirmative Action Debate. University Press of America. ISBN 978-0-7618-0413-0.
- ——— (2002). The New White Nationalism in America: Its Challenge to Integration. Cambridge University Press. ISBN 978-0-521-54558-7.
- Carol M. Swain; Russ Nieli, eds. (2003). Contemporary Voices of White Nationalism in America. Cambridge University Press. ISBN 978-0-521-01693-3.
- Carol M. Swain, ed. (2007). Debating Immigration (1st ed.). Cambridge University Press. ISBN 978-0521875608., 2nd edition 2018, ISBN 978-1-108-47046-9
- Carol M. Swain (2011). Be the People: A Call to Reclaim America's Faith and Promise. Thomas Nelson. ISBN 978-0-8499-4828-2.
- Steven Feazel; Carol M. Swain (2016). Abduction: How Liberalism Steals Our Children's Hearts and Minds. Christian Faith Publishing. ISBN 978-1-63525-146-3.
- Carol M. Swain; Steven Feazel (2016). Who's Stealing Our Kids?: Revealing the Hidden Agenda to Secularize Our Children. Frontline. ISBN 978-1-62998-748-4.
- Carol M. Swain (2021). Countercultural Living: What Jesus Has to Say About Life, Marriage, Race, Gender, and Materialism (Real Life Theology). RENEW.org. ISBN 978-1949921830.
- Carol M. Swain; Christopher J. Schorr (2021). Black Eye for America: How Critical Race Theory is Burning Down the House. Be the People Books. ISBN 978-1-7374198-0-8.
- Carol M. Swain; Mike Towle (2023). The Adversity of Diversity. Be the People Books. ISBN 978-1737419822.
- Carol M. Swain (2024). A Gay Affair. Be the People Books. ISBN 978-1737419846.

=== Essays ===
- "Double Standard, Double Bind: African-American Leadership After the Thomas Debacle" in Race-ing Justice, En-Gendering Power: Essays on Anita Hill, Clarence Thomas, and the Construction of Social Reality (1992). Pantheon Books. Edited by Toni Morrison. ISBN 0-679-74145-3.

== See also ==
- Black conservatism in the United States
