= Choose How You Move (Nashville) =

2024 referendum in Nashville, Tennessee, US

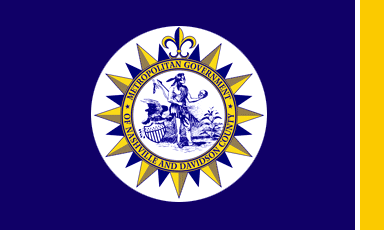
- November 5, 2024
- Transit Improvement Program Referendum
- Website: https://transit.nashville.gov/

Results
Choice	Votes	%
Yes	183,108	65.53%
No	96,305	34.47%

Choose How You Move was a local referendum in Nashville, Tennessee, that was held on November 5, 2024 and passed with 66% voter approval. The referendum asked Davidson County residents to approve a 0.5% increase in the sales tax to fund Mayor Freddie O'Connell's signature $3.1 billion transportation improvement program. The tax increase went into effect on February 1, 2025.

The plan will invest in new sidewalks, a network of smart traffic signals, street safety improvements, bus stop upgrades, express bus routes, and additional park and ride lots. The plan will also establish 10 "All-Access Corridors" across the city, featuring higher frequency transit, increased road safety, and the option to expand bus rapid transit. The plan does not include funding for light rail.

== Background ==
Nashville's 19th-century electric streetcar system was replaced by motor buses, and in the 1970s the Metro government took over transit operations, forming the Metropolitan Transit Authority. Despite launching initiatives like the Music City Star commuter rail in 2006 and multiple bus lines, modern efforts to overhaul the system, including Mayor Karl Dean's 2011 rapid bus plan and Mayor Megan Barry's 2017 light rail proposal (Let's Move Nashville), have failed, with state politics, budget shortfalls, and local opposition contributing to the collapse of these projects.

A 2023 Forbes report listed Nashville as the U.S. city with the hardest commute, citing the city's poor walkability, lack of safety for bicycles, and low access to public transportation. Another 2023 report listed Nashville as the second-most dangerous city in the nation for pedestrians.

In 2023, Freddie O'Connell was elected mayor of Nashville after promising increased investment in public transportation, road safety, and investments in sidewalks. After public input, foundational plans, and feedback from the Metro Council, Mayor O'Connell released his transportation improvement plan in 2024.

== Transportation Improvement Plan ==
In April 2024, the O'Connell administration released its Transportation Improvement Plan (TIP). Afterwards, the Davidson County Election Commission approved a referendum on a 0.5% increase in the sales tax to fund the plan, bringing the combined state and local sales tax from 9.25% to 9.75% in Davidson County.

=== Sidewalks, Signals, and Safety ===
The TIP calls for creating 86 miles of new or upgraded sidewalks, targeting high-traffic areas and underserved communities. Additionally, the plan includes plans to modernize 592 traffic signals with real-time traffic management. The TIP also seeks to address pedestrian and cyclist safety by implementing upgrades at 35 high-injury intersections and creating 39 miles of complete streets.

=== All-Access Corridors ===
The plan calls for expanding bus service along busiest corridors, which serve 80% of the city's transit ridership. This high-frequency bus service would run at least every 15 minutes. In the plan, these 54 miles of "All-Access Corridors" would feature dedicated transit lanes, new sidewalks, and signal priority systems that allow buses to move through intersections faster. Key corridors include Murfreesboro Pike, Gallatin Pike, and Nolensville Pike.

=== WeGo Essentials ===
The plan also includes funding for WeGo, Nashville's public transit service. The TIP will upgrade 285 bus stops, build 12 new transit centers, and add 17 park-and-ride facilities, along with creating a larger, more modernized bus fleet. Improvements also include an 80% increase in WeGo bus service hours, decreased wait times, and 24-hour service. Expanding the WeGo bus service is the most costly part of the plan.

=== Service enhancements ===
The program will increase the frequency of local buses, crosstown routes, and introduce four new express routes. These include 24/7 routes with shorter wait times Regional service would be expanded with improvements to the WeGo STAR commuter rail system.

== Campaign ==
=== "For" Campaign ===
The "For" Campaign, titled Vote FOR Nashville, was organized by Green Lights for Nashville.

=== "Against" Campaign ===
The "Against" campaign was led by the Committee to Stop an UnFair Tax and focused on handing out free yard signs.

Americans for Prosperity, the conservative advocacy group which campaigned heavily against the 2017 light rail proposal, opted against participating in the 2024 referendum. Similarly, The People's Alliance for Transit, Housing and Employment, a lead anti-referendum group from 2017, chose not to organize in 2024.

=== Endorsements ===
"For" Campaign
City-wide politicians
- Freddie O'Connell, mayor of Nashville (2024–present)
- Angie Henderson, vice mayor of Nashville (2024–present)

Nashville Metro Council members

- Deonté Harrell (District 8)
- Clay Capp (District 6)
- Terry Vo (District 17)

Organizations

- Southern Environmental Law Center
- Tennessee Immigrant and Refugee Rights Coalition

Labor leaders

- Ethan Link, Laborer's International Union of North America

"Against" Campaign
Nashville Metro Council Members
- Courtney Johnston (District 26)

Former Nashville Metro Council Members

- Emily Evans (2007-2015)

== Results ==
Choose How You Move Nashville
Choice	Votes	%
For	183,108	65.53
Against	96,305	34.47
Total	279,413	100.00
Source: https://www.nashville.gov/departments/elections/election-results-and-statistics/election-results/current-election

== Impact ==
In October 2025, within a year of the referendum passing, Mayor O'Connell announced $104 million in funding for transit projects in the Choose How You Move program. This funding included sidewalk improvement projects, smart signals to be installed at over 100 intersections, improvements to transiting to the airport, street redesigns, and WeGo improvements. WeGo and the mayor's office also rolled out a free bus fare program for qualifying low-income residents called the "Journey Pass".

By January 2026, WeGo announced that they added 12 new buses to their fleet and that ridership increased 7.3% from the previous year.
