= 2019 Nashville mayoral election =

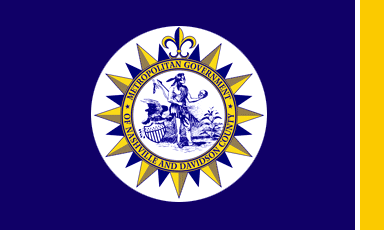
- August 1, 2019 (first round); September 12, 2019 (runoff); Officially nonpartisan
- Turnout: 23.64% ▲ (first round) 2.39 pp 20.96% ▼ (runoff) 2.68 pp
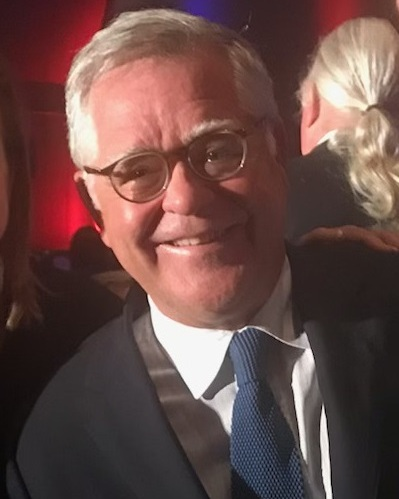

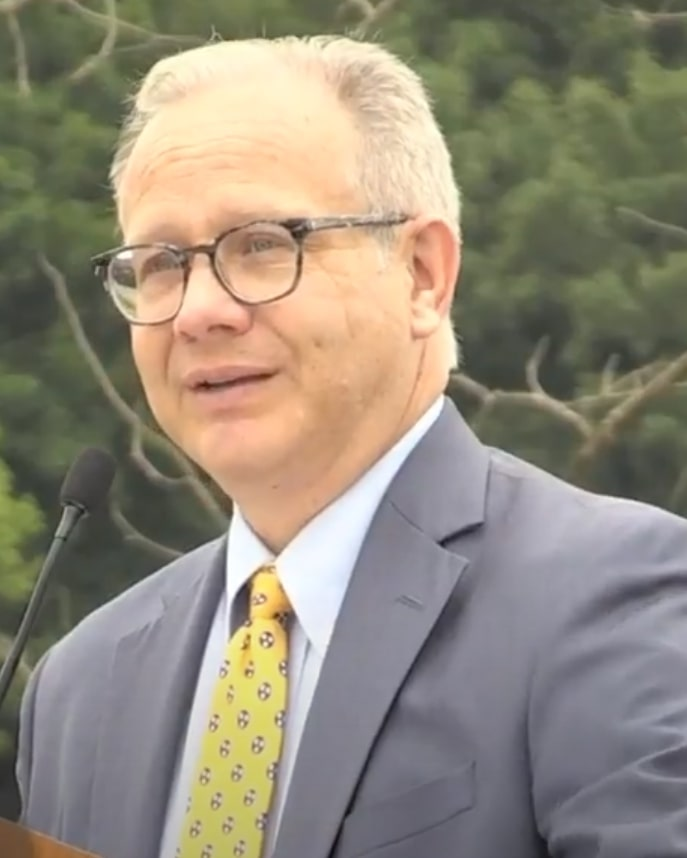

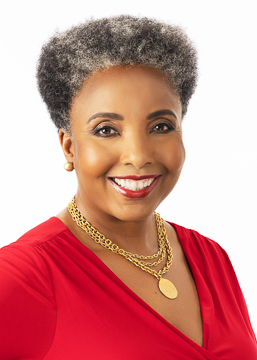

Candidate	John Cooper	David Briley
Party	Democratic	Democratic
First round	35,676; 34.98%	25,786; 25.28%
Runoff	62,440; 69.12%	27,281; 30.20%
Candidate	Carol Swain	John Ray Clemmons
Party	Republican	Democratic
First round	22,387; 21.95%	16,391; 16.07%
Runoff	Eliminated	Eliminated
- Cooper: 20–30% 30–40% 40–50% 60–70% Briley: 20–30% 30–40% 40–50% Swain: 20–30% 30–40% 40–50% Clemmons: 30–40% Tie No data Cooper: 50–60% 60–70% 70–80% 80–90% <90% Briley: 50–60% 60–70% No data
Mayor before election
David Briley
Democratic
Elected mayor
John Cooper
Democratic

The 2019 Nashville mayoral election took place on August 1, 2019, to elect the mayor of Nashville, Tennessee. Incumbent Democratic Mayor David Briley, who succeeded Megan Barry following her resignation and won a special election to fill the remainder of her term, ran for re-election. In the August election, Briley came in second behind city councilman John Cooper; however, no candidate took more than 50 percent of the vote, forcing a runoff between Cooper and Briley on September 12, 2019. Cooper won the runoff definitively with 69 percent of the vote.

All Nashville municipal elections are required to be non-partisan, but candidates can be affiliated with a political party.

== Candidates ==
=== Advanced to runoff ===
- David Briley, incumbent mayor of Nashville
- John Cooper, member of the Metropolitan Council

=== Eliminated in first round ===
- Jody Ball, businessman and GOP candidate in US-5
- Julia Clark-Johnson, professional driving administrator and instructor
- John Ray Clemmons, state representative for the 55th district
- Bernie Cox, musician
- Harold "Hollywood Howie" Garoutte, retired U.S. Army sergeant and owner and operator of Southern Country Radio
- Jimmy Lawrence, small business owner
- Jon Sewell, small business owner and 2018 candidate
- Carol M. Swain, former professor at Vanderbilt University
- Nolan Starnes, community activist

=== Potential ===
- Jeff Obafemi Carr, community organizer
- Erica Gilmore, member of the Metropolitan Council
- Daron Hall, sheriff of Davidson County
- James Shaw Jr., hero of the Nashville Waffle House shooting

=== Declined ===
- Megan Barry, former mayor of Nashville
- Bill Freeman, real estate developer and owner of the Nashville Scene, Nashville Post, and Nfocus
- Harold Love, state representative from the 58th district
- Bob Mendes, member of the Metropolitan Council
- Jeffrey Napier, U.S. Army veteran and former mechanic for Metro Nashville Government
- Renata Soto, nonprofit executive and former director of Conexión Américas

== Results ==
=== First round ===
2019 Nashville mayoral election results (first round)
Candidate	Votes	%
John Cooper	35,676	34.98
David Briley (incumbent)	25,786	25.28
Carol Swain	22,387	21.95
John Ray Clemmons	16,391	16.07
Julia Clark-Johnson	404	0.40
Bernie Cox	337	0.33
Jimmy Lawrence	305	0.30
Jody Ball	280	0.27
Jon Sewell	224	0.22
Nolan Starnes	129	0.13
Write-in	83	0.08
Total votes	102,002	100

=== Second round ===
2019 Nashville mayoral election results (runoff)
Candidate	Votes	%
John Cooper	62,440	69.12
David Briley (incumbent)	27,281	30.20
Write-in	621	0.69
Total votes	90,342	100.00

== See also ==
- 2019 Jackson, Tennessee mayoral election
- 2019 Knoxville, Tennessee mayoral election
- 2019 Memphis, Tennessee mayoral election
