= 2018 Nashville mayoral special election =

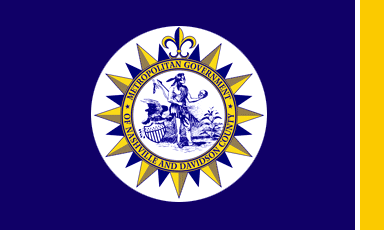
- May 24, 2018; Officially nonpartisan
- Turnout: 20.71% ▼8.92 pp
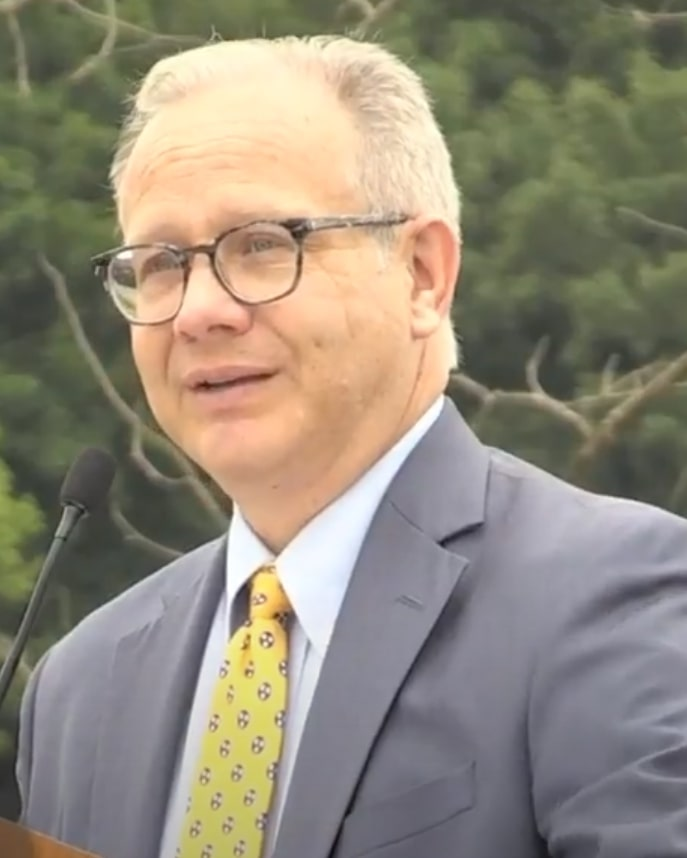

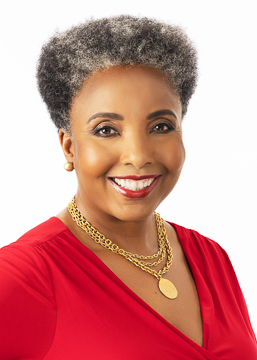

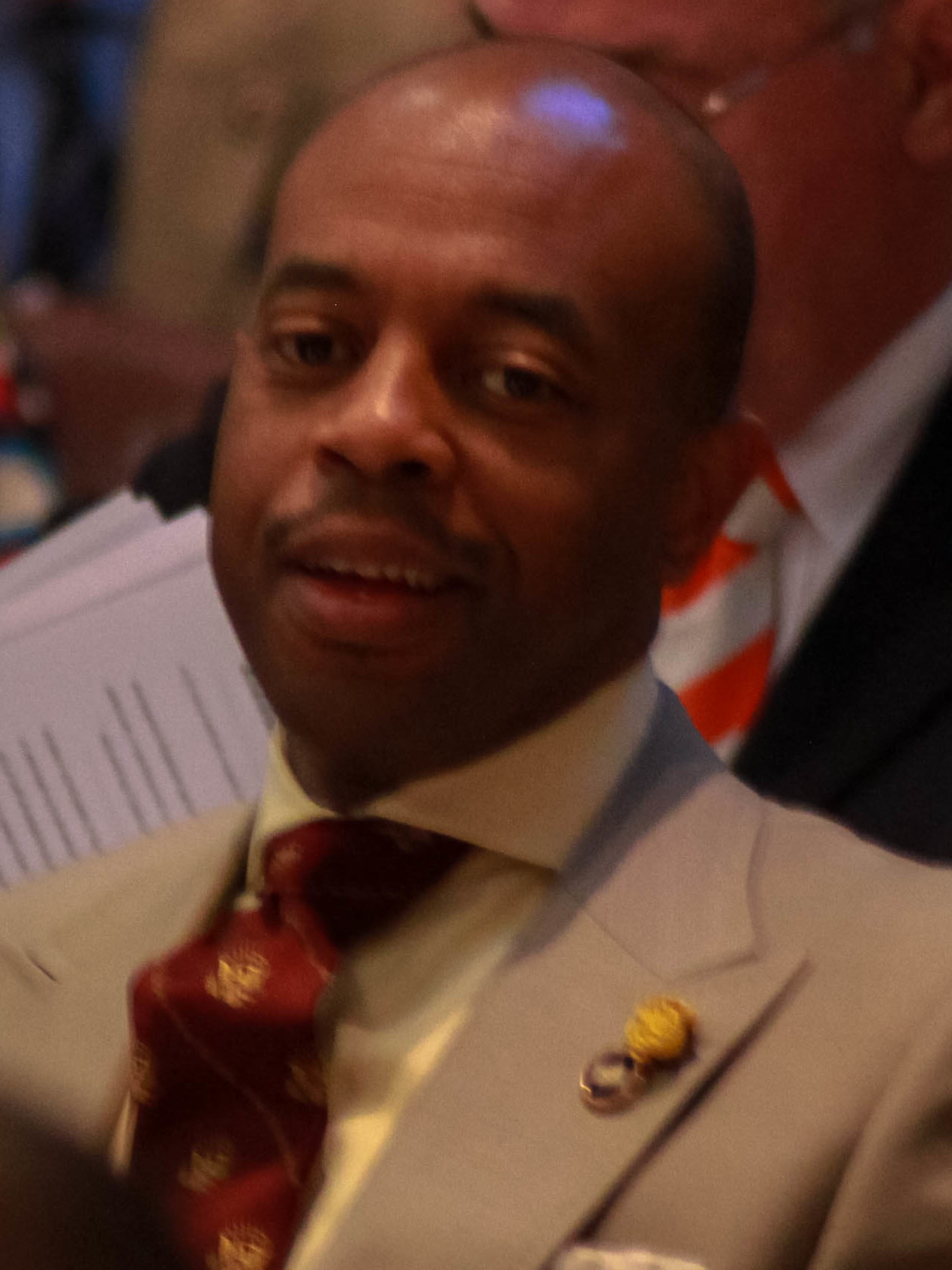

Candidate	David Briley	Carol Swain	Erica Gilmore
Party	Democratic	Republican	Democratic
Popular vote	44,845	18,850	4,608
Percentage	54.44%	22.89%	5.59%
Candidate	Harold M. Love Jr.	Ralph Bristol
Party	Democratic	Republican
Popular vote	4,349	4,341
Percentage	5.28%	5.27%
- Results by precinct Briley: 20–30% 30–40% 40–50% 50–60% 60–70% 80–90% Swain: 30–40% 40–50% 50–60% Gilmore: >90% No data
Mayor before election
David Briley
Elected mayor
David Briley

The 2018 Nashville mayoral special election took place on May 24, 2018, to elect the next mayor of Nashville, Tennessee. David Briley, a Democrat who became interim mayor after the resignation of Megan Barry, won outright without a runoff election.

Former Mayor Megan Barry resigned on March 6, 2018, for embezzlement on March 6, 2018, so the Davidson County Election Commission scheduled an election for August 2, 2018 to coincide with the state primary elections, school board elections and the election of several other municipal officials. However, mayoral candidate Ludye Wallace sued on the basis of state law (T.C.A. § 2-14-102) and a 2007 Metropolitan government charter amendment, both requiring an earlier election if the next general metropolitan election was more than twelve months away. The Tennessee Supreme Court agreed with Wallace's argument, unanimously ordering a mayoral election between May 21 and May 25.

Early voting was scheduled from May 4 to May 19. All Nashville municipal elections are required to be non-partisan, but each candidate was affiliated with a political party. If no candidate had won a majority of the vote, a runoff would have been held on June 28 between the top two finishers.

== Candidates ==
Fourteen candidates nominated for the mayoral election. David Briley was the sole candidate in support of Nashville's transit plan, which was decided in a referendum on May 1. Nashville voters overwhelmingly rejected the plan, by about a 2–1 margin.

=== Declared ===
- Carlin J. Alford
- David Briley
- Ralph Bristol
- Jeff Obafemi Carr
- Julia Clark-Johnson
- Roy Dale
- Erica Gilmore
- Albert Hacker
- David L. Hiland
- Harold Love
- Jeffrey A. Napier
- Jon Sewell
- Carol M. Swain
- Ludye N. Wallace

== Results ==
Election results May 24, 2018
Candidate	Votes	%
David Briley	44,845	54.44
Carol M. Swain	18,850	22.89
Erica Gilmore	4,608	5.59
Harold M. Love	4,349	5.28
Ralph Bristol	4,341	5.27
Jeff Obafemi Carr	3,790	4.60
David L. Hiland	325	0.39
Ludye N. Wallace	324	0.39
Caril J. Alford	243	0.30
Albert Hacker	169	0.21
Julia Clark-Johnson	168	0.20
Jeffery A. Napier	141	0.17
Jon Sewell	93	0.11
Write-in	122	0.15
Total votes	82,369	100.00

== See also ==
- Let's Move Nashville
- 2018 Tennessee elections
