= John Cooper (Tennessee politician) =

Former Mayor of Nashville, Tennessee, United States

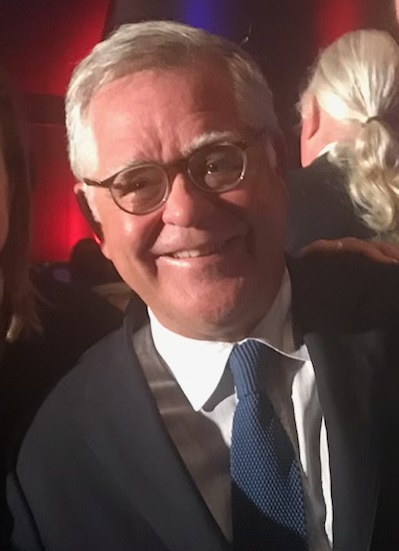

9th Mayor of Metropolitan Nashville
- In office September 28, 2019 – September 25, 2023
- Preceded by: David Briley
- Succeeded by: Freddie O'Connell

Personal details
- Born: October 15, 1956 (age 70) Nashville, Tennessee, U.S.
- Party: Democratic
- Spouse: Laura Fitzgerald
- Children: 3
- Relatives: Prentice Cooper (father); Jim Cooper (brother)
- Education: Harvard University (BA); Vanderbilt University (MBA)

John Cooper (born October 15, 1956) is an American businessman who was the mayor of Nashville, Tennessee from 2019 to 2023. He served as a councilman at-large on the Metropolitan Council of Nashville and Davidson County from 2015 until 2019. A member of the Democratic Party, he is the brother of former U.S. representative Jim Cooper, who represented Tennessee's 5th congressional district, which was also based in Nashville. He is also the son of former governor and U.S. Ambassador to Peru Prentice Cooper.

== Education and early career ==
Cooper was born in Nashville, the third and youngest son of former governor Prentice Cooper, and raised in Shelbyville, Tennessee. He earned his bachelor's degree from Harvard University, and his Master of Business Administration from Vanderbilt University in 1985. He worked in finance for Shearson Lehman Brothers on Wall Street, before returning to Nashville to work in real estate development in Williamson County, Tennessee.

== Political career ==
In 1980, Cooper worked on the congressional campaign of Buddy Roemer and the campaign of Jane Eskind for the Tennessee Public Service Commission. Roemer hired Cooper, then 23 years old, as his chief of staff. In 1982, Cooper returned to Nashville to help his brother, Jim, run for the United States House of Representatives in Tennessee's 4th congressional district.

Cooper ran for an at-large seat on the Metropolitan Council of Nashville and Davidson County in 2015. He was elected, receiving the most votes of the candidates running for the five available at-large seats.

He ran for mayor of Nashville in the 2019 Nashville mayoral election. In the election's first round, Cooper led all candidates with 35% of the vote, advancing to a runoff election against David Briley, who received 25%, as both were ahead of Vanderbilt University professor Carol M. Swain and Tennessee house of representatives member John Ray Clemmons in the 10-candidate race. He defeated Briley in the runoff election, receiving 69% of the vote. He is the first candidate to defeat an incumbent mayor of Nashville in an election since its consolidation in 1963. His campaign financing included $1.4 million in personal loans. Cooper raised less money for his campaign than his opponent but outspent Briley using his own money. He was sworn into office on September 28.

On January 31, 2023, Cooper announced that he would not run for reelection in the 2023 Nashville mayoral election.

== Personal life ==
His wife, Laura Fitzgerald Cooper, is a former constitutional law professor. They have three sons. His father, Prentice Cooper, was the 39th governor of Tennessee. His brother, Jim was the U.S. representative for Tennessee's 5th congressional district, which prior to redistricting, encompassed Nashville and two surrounding counties.

== See also ==
- List of mayors of the 50 largest cities in the United States

Political offices
Preceded by David Briley	Mayor of Nashville; 2019–2023	Succeeded by Freddie O'Connell
