= David Briley =

American politician

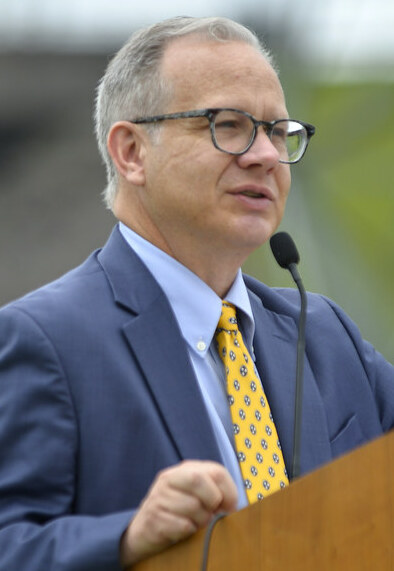
- Briley in 2018

8th Mayor of Metropolitan Nashville
- In office March 6, 2018 – September 28, 2019; Acting: March 6, 2018 – May 24, 2018
- Preceded by: Megan Barry
- Succeeded by: John Cooper

Vice Mayor of Nashville
- In office September 25, 2015 – May 24, 2018
- Preceded by: Diane Neighbors
- Succeeded by: Jim Shulman

Personal details
- Born: Clifton David Briley; January 8, 1964 (age 62) Nashville, Tennessee, U.S.
- Party: Democratic
- Spouse: Jodie Bell
- Children: 1
- Education: Georgetown University (BA); Golden Gate University (JD)

Clifton David Briley (born January 8, 1964) is an American public servant for the city of Nashville, Tennessee. A Democrat, he was the eighth mayor of Metropolitan Nashville and Davidson County. He was elected in 2015 as vice-mayor and was sworn in as acting mayor after Megan Barry's resignation on March 6, 2018. Briley went on to win the May 24 special election for the balance of Barry's term with 55% of the vote over nearly a dozen challengers, avoiding a runoff and making him the official mayor of Nashville. John Cooper defeated Briley in the 2019 Nashville mayoral election. Briley was the first native of both Nashville and Tennessee since Bill Boner in 1991 to be mayor.

== Education ==
Briley is a lifelong Nashvillian, and his grandfather Beverly Briley was the first elected mayor of Metropolitan Nashville. His early education included Glendale Elementary School, Lipscomb Middle School, and Montgomery Bell Academy.

Briley earned a bachelor's degree from Georgetown University in 1987 before traveling to Latin America where he volunteered as a teacher of English. He completed his JD at Golden Gate University in 1995 and received honors for administrative and environmental law.

== Political career ==
Briley was elected to serve as an At Large Metro Councilman for Davidson County from 1999 to 2007. He was the Vice-Chair of the Budget and Finance Committee and held seats on the Personnel, Public Information, Human Relations and Housing Committee, the Traffic and Parking Committee and the Greenways Committee. He was past Chair of the Ad Hoc Committee on Solid Waste and the Water Rate Oversight Committee.

Briley was voted Best Council Member by the Nashville Scene in 2001, 2002 and 2006 and was spotlighted as one of "40 under 40" by Business Nashville magazine in June 2000.

During the 2000 presidential election, Briley was a Tennessee state co-chair of GoreNet. GoreNet was a group that supported the Al Gore campaign with a focus on grassroots and online organizing as well as hosting small dollar donor events.

In November 2006, Briley announced his candidacy for Mayor of Nashville. His campaign included a number of familiar political faces, including Will Cheek Jr., member of the Democratic National Committee and former chair of the Tennessee Democratic Party, and his son, Will Cheek III, an attorney at the firm of Bone McAllester Norton. Jerry Martin, who served at Finance Director under Congressman Jim Cooper in 2002, chaired the campaign's finance committee. Emily Passini was campaign manager; Drew Staniewski was deputy campaign manager. Sarah Lingo was finance director and Alex Youn was director of field operations. Briley finished fifth in the August 2007 election and returned to private life.

In 2015, Briley was elected Vice Mayor of Nashville. On March 6, 2018, Mayor Megan Barry resigned her position after pleading guilty to felony theft in a plea bargain regarding improper use of public funds for travel expenses and an affair with the head of her security, leaving the Vice Mayor to fill the position. Briley was sworn in as acting mayor of Metro Nashville.

Within a week of his acceding to the office, Briley announced both his intent to run for the remaining year of Barry's term in the Nashville mayoral election, which was initially set for August 2, 2018 by the Davidson County Election Commission, but subsequently moved to May 2018 after a lawsuit filed by opponents was successful, and a plan to demolish the abandoned Herschel Greer Stadium, former home of the Nashville Sounds minor league baseball team. Greer Stadium was on the grounds of Civil War Fort Negley, and Briley announced a plan to leave the area as undeveloped, natural park space, in part out of respect to the many slaves and former slaves who worked on the construction of Fort Negley, several of whom died in the process and whose remains are buried on the grounds. Briley also continued the mayor's office's support of the Let's Move Nashville transit referendum, signing a "Declaration of Transportation Independence" on April 2. Briley's support seemingly meant little to the transit referendum, which was defeated by over a three-to-two majority on May 1, 2018, but apparently his support did little to dampen his personal popularity, as he was elected by an absolute majority to the balance of Berry's unexpired term in a special election only three weeks later over a dozen opponents, all of whom had expressed opposition to the transit initiative.

Briley campaigned for re-election as Mayor of Metropolitan Nashville in the 2019 Nashville mayoral election. In the election's first round, John Cooper led Briley 35% to 25% as both advanced to a runoff election in the 10-candidate race, followed by Vanderbilt University professor Carol M. Swain and Tennessee House of Representatives member John Ray Clemmons. In the runoff, Briley was defeated by Cooper by approximately 70% to 30%. Cooper then succeeded Briley as Mayor of Nashville when he was sworn in on September 28, 2019.

== Judicial Service ==
Briley was elected as the Division I Circuit Court Judge for Davidson County, Tennessee in August 2022.

== Contributions ==
In 2005, Briley proposed citywide wireless Internet access for Nashville. Received coolly by the administration, Briley's proposal nonetheless contributed to the development of free wireless access at Davidson County's public libraries as well as many public parks, including Centennial Park. A task force, led by Briley and including council members and representatives from technology and infrastructure providers, ultimately supported this narrower public access. In 2006, Briley was one of a small number of vocal opponents to proposed development which would have moved the city's AAA baseball team, the Nashville Sounds, into downtown Nashville. This proposed development, adjacent to Nashville's Riverfront Park along the Cumberland River, was eventually cancelled and later replaced by a plan for a new stadium located slightly north of downtown Nashville, First Tennessee Park.

In 2007, Briley wrote legislation requiring government buildings in Nashville to be built within LEED certification requirements.

== Personal life ==
Briley is married to Jodie Bell and has one son. He is the grandson of Beverly Briley, first mayor of the combined Metropolitan Government of Nashville and Davidson County. His brother, Rob Briley, has previously served as a Tennessee State Representative for the 52nd District.

Briley has been a practicing lawyer and was a member of Bone McAllester Norton PLLC prior to becoming mayor and having to wind up his legal practice; unlike his former position of vice mayor, being Mayor of Nashville is a full-time occupation. After his defeat for a full term, Briley returned to his previous position at Bone McAllester Norton until being elected to Circuit Court.

== See also ==
- List of mayors of the 50 largest cities in the United States

Political offices
| Preceded by Megan Barry | Mayor of Nashville; 2018–2019 | Succeeded by John Cooper |
