= Freddie O'Connell =

American politician

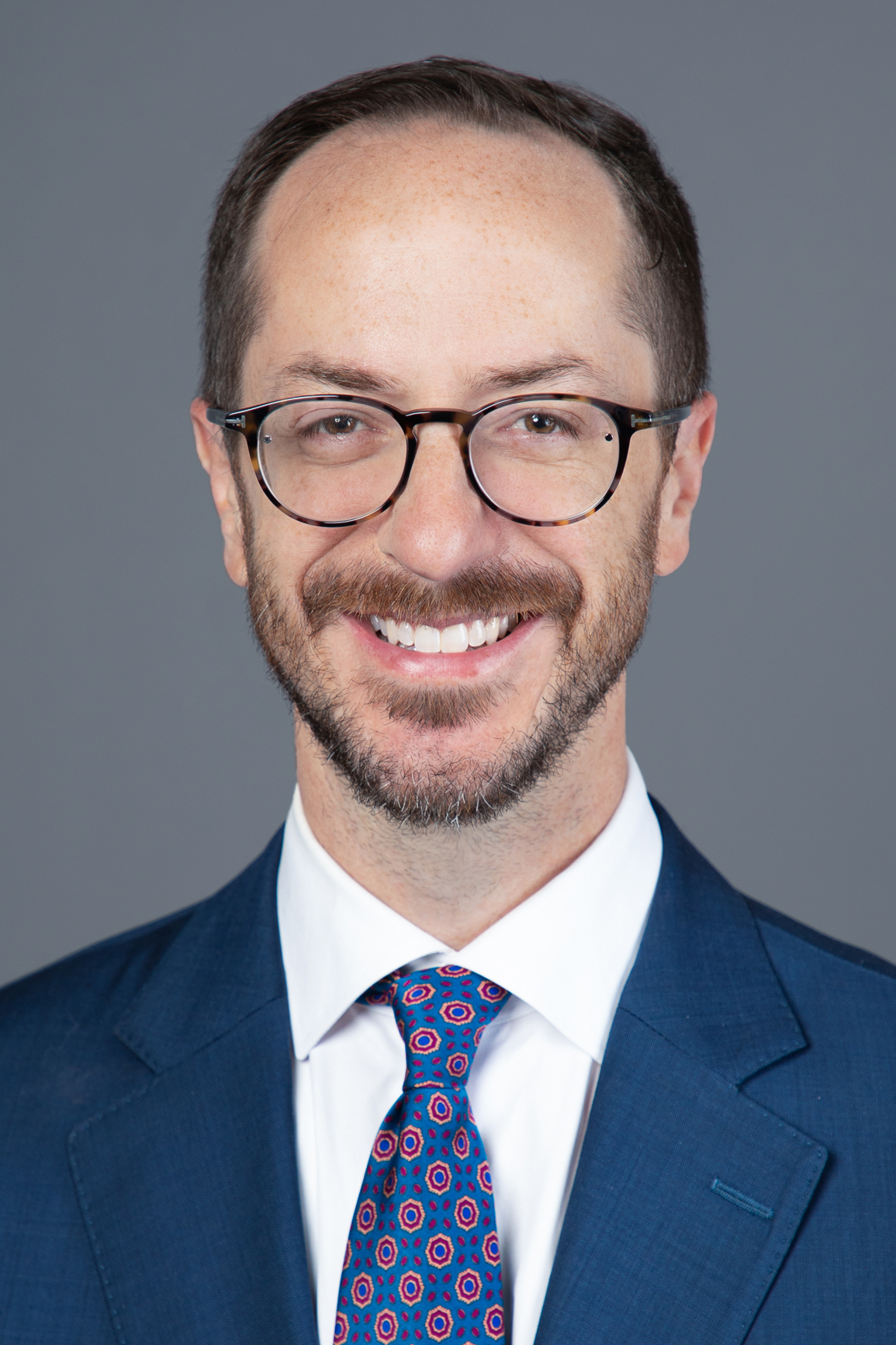
- O'Connell in 2023

10th Mayor of Metropolitan Nashville
- Incumbent
- Assumed office September 25, 2023
- Preceded by: John Cooper

Member of the Nashville Metro Council from the 19th district
- In office September 1, 2015 – September 1, 2023
- Preceded by: Erica Gilmore
- Succeeded by: Jacob Kupin

Personal details
- Born: Thomas Frederick O'Connell; 1976 or 1977 (age 49–50) Nashville, Tennessee, U.S.
- Party: Democratic
- Domestic partner: Whitney Boon
- Children: 2
- Education: Brown University (BA, BS)
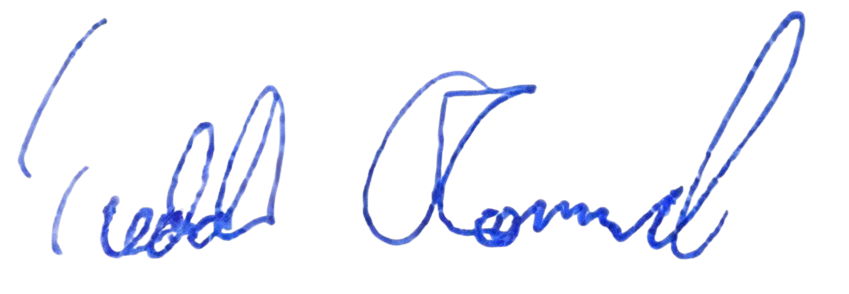
- Signature

Thomas Frederick O'Connell (born 1976) is an American politician and currently serves as the 10th Mayor of the Metropolitan Government of Nashville and Davidson County. From 2015 to 2023, he served as a member of the Nashville Metro Council representing the 19th district.

== Early life and career ==
O'Connell was born in Nashville, Tennessee, to Beatrice, a retired teacher, and Tim, a federal civil servant and part-time songwriter. He graduated from Montgomery Bell Academy in 1995, and earned two bachelor's degrees from Brown University in 2000, one in Music and the other in Computer Science. He is of Jewish descent through one of his grandparents.

O'Connell began his career in software and technology, working for startups and publicly traded companies. He was also president of the Salemtown Neighbors Neighborhood Association. From 2005 until 2010, he co-hosted a political talk show on WRVU, the Vanderbilt University student radio station.

== Political career ==
In 2002, O'Connell ran as an independent against future Speaker of the Tennessee House of Representatives Beth Harwell.

O'Connell formerly served as a board member and chair of the board for the Nashville Metropolitan Transit Authority. While municipal elections in Nashville are officially nonpartisan, O'Connell is a registered Democrat.

In 2015, O'Connell ran for the Nashville Metro Council in the 19th district, receiving 54 percent of the vote during the August 6 election. In 2019, he ran for reelection unopposed.

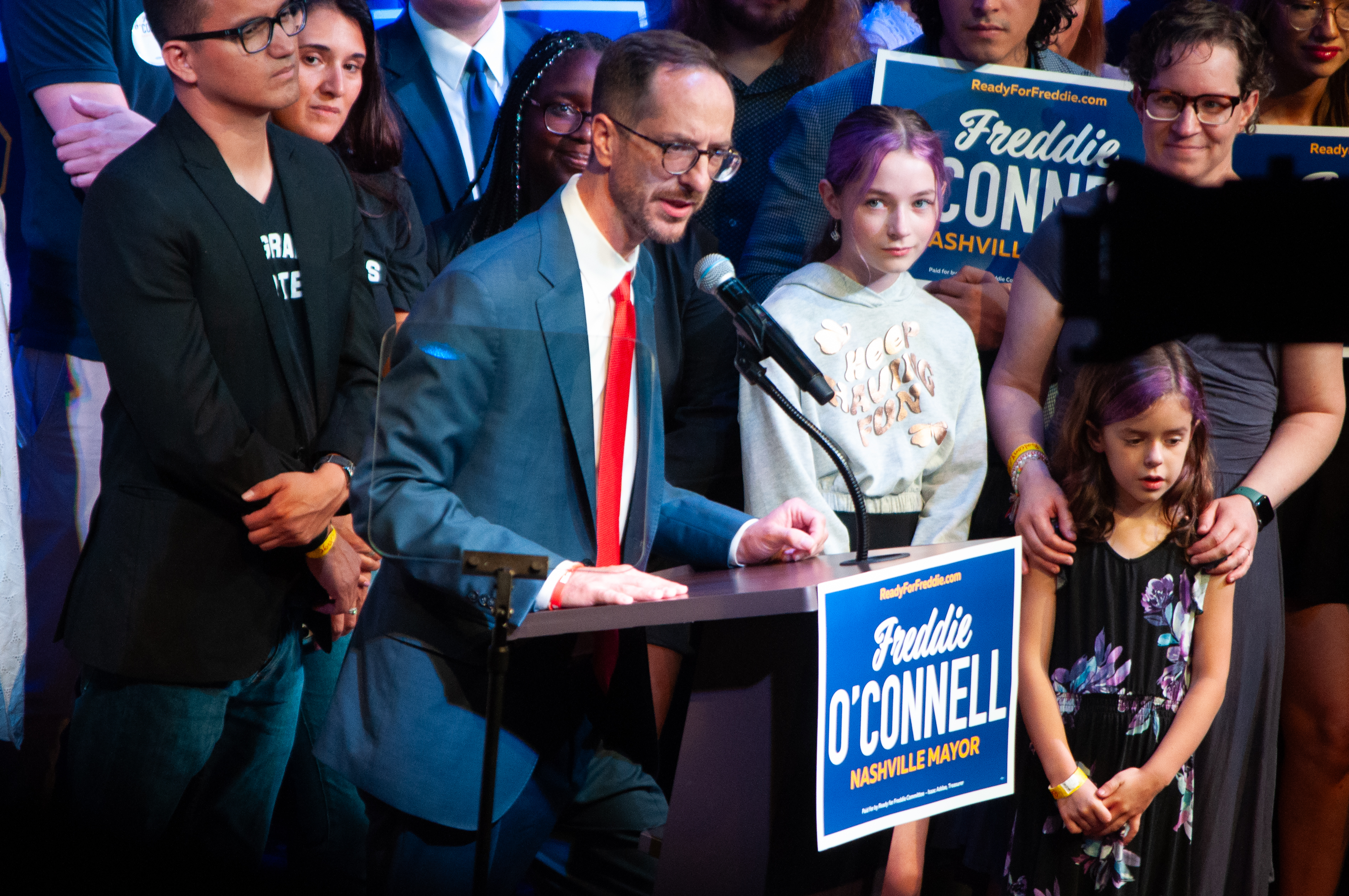
O'Connell after being declared the winner in the first round of the 2023 Nashville mayoral election

In April 2022, O'Connell announced that he would run for mayor of Nashville in the 2023 Nashville mayoral election. In the first round of voting, O'Connell led all candidates with 27.2% of the vote. He defeated Alice Rolli in the runoff on September 14, 2023, winning 64% of the vote. He was sworn into office on September 25.

== Personal life ==
O'Connell lives in the Salemtown neighborhood of Nashville with his partner, Dr. Whitney Boon, an attending child neurologist at Monroe Carell Jr. Children's Hospital at Vanderbilt, and their two children. He has been known to occasionally DJ at events in the Nashville area.

== Electoral history ==
Tennessee's 56th state house district General Election, 2002
Party	Candidate	Votes	%
Republican	Beth Harwell	17,424	66.9
Democratic	Shannon Wood	7,152	27.5
Independent	Thomas F. O'Connell	1,471	5.6
Total votes		26,047	100.0
Republican hold			

2015 Nashville Metro Council Election, District 19
Candidate	Votes	%
Freddie O'Connell	900	54.3
Amanda Harrison	322	19.4
Keith Caldwell	237	14.3
Bill Shick	190	11.5
Write-in	8	0.5
Total votes	1,657	100

2019 Nashville Metro Council Election, District 19
Candidate	Votes	%
Freddie O'Connell	1,709	96.6
Write-in	61	3.4
Total votes	1,770	100

2023 Nashville mayoral election (first round)
Candidate	Votes	%
Freddie O'Connell	27,503	27.14
Alice Rolli	20,472	20.20
Matthew Wiltshire	17,193	16.97
Jeff Yarbro	12,356	12.19
Heidi Campbell	8,337	8.23
Sharon Hurt	6,104	6.02
Vivian Willhoite	4,758	4.70
Jim Gingrich	1,668	1.65
Natisha Brooks	1,458	1.44
Stephanie Johnson	581	0.57
Fran Bush	503	0.50
Bernie Cox	322	0.32
Write-in	80	0.07
Total votes	101,335	100.00

2023 Nashville Mayoral general election (runoff)
Candidate	Votes	%
Freddie O'Connell	72,989	63.8
Alice Rolli	41,205	36.0
Write-in	123	0.1
Total votes	114,317	100

Political offices
Preceded by John Cooper	Mayor of Nashville; 2023–present	Incumbent
