= John Ray Clemmons =

American politician (born 1977)

John Clemmons

Member of the Tennessee House of Representatives from the 55th district
- Incumbent
- Assumed office January 13, 2015
- Preceded by: Gary Odom

Personal details
- Born: July 14, 1977 (age 49) Lebanon, Tennessee, U.S.
- Party: Democratic
- Spouse: Tamara Baxt
- Education: Columbia University (BA); University of Memphis (JD)

John Ray Clemmons (born July 14, 1977) is an American politician from the state of Tennessee. A member of the Democratic Party, he serves in the Tennessee House of Representatives, representing the 55th district, in West Nashville.

== Early life ==
Clemmons was born and raised in Lebanon, Tennessee, and attended Lebanon High School, graduating with honors in 1995. In 1999, he earned a bachelor of arts in history from Columbia University, where he was a member of the Columbia lightweight crew team. He received a juris doctor from the University of Memphis Law School in 2006.

His wife Tamara and he have three children and live in Nashville, Tennessee. Clemmons is a civil litigation attorney.

== Political career ==
In 2014, Clemmons defeated incumbent Gary Odom, for the 55th district in the Tennessee House of Representatives in the Democratic primary with 54% of the vote. Clemmons was unopposed in the general election. Clemmons was unopposed in for re-election in the primary and general elections in 2016, 2018, and 2020.

In a 10-candidate race, Clemmons finished fourth in his run for mayor of Nashville in the 2019 Nashville mayoral election. His campaign focused on public education, affordable housing and infrastructure.

In 2022, Clemmons was rated 92% by the National Organization for the Reform of Marijuana Laws.

In January 2022, Clemmons criticized the McMinn County school board's 10-0 decision to remove the Pulitzer Prize-winning Holocaust novel Maus from its curriculum for eighth-grade English classes. Clemmons called the decision counterproductive, saying that without access to the personal accounts of survivors of the Holocaust, children will lose empathy for others.
