= Megan Barry =

American politician (born 1963)

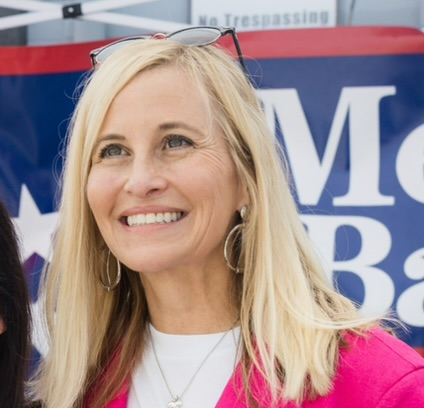
- Barry in 2024

7th Mayor of Metropolitan Nashville
- In office September 25, 2015 – March 6, 2018
- Preceded by: Karl Dean
- Succeeded by: David Briley

Personal details
- Born: Megan Christine Mueller; September 22, 1963 (age 63) Santa Ana, California, U.S.
- Party: Democratic
- Spouse: Bruce Barry
- Children: 1
- Education: Baker University (BA); Vanderbilt University (MBA)
- Website: Official website

Megan Christine Barry (née Mueller; born September 22, 1963) is an American businesswoman and politician who served as the seventh mayor of the Metropolitan Government of Nashville and Davidson County from 2015 until March 6, 2018, when she resigned after pleading guilty to felony theft related to an extramarital affair with a city employee who had served as the head of her security detail. Barry is a member of the Democratic Party.

== Early life and education ==
Barry was born on September 22, 1963, in Santa Ana, California and grew up in Overland Park, Kansas where she graduated from the private all-girls Notre Dame de Sion School in nearby Kansas City, Missouri. She earned a bachelor's degree in elementary education from Baker University in Baldwin City, Kansas in 1986, where she was a member of Alpha Chi Omega. She also earned an MBA from the Owen Graduate School of Management at Vanderbilt University in 1993.

== Business career ==
Barry worked in business ethics and corporate responsibility for the multinational telecommunications firm Nortel Networks. From 2003 to 2012, Barry was vice president of ethics and compliance at Premier, Inc., a health-care group purchasing organization. She also worked as principal of Barry & Associates, an independent consulting organization to multinational corporations on issues dealing with business ethics and corporate social responsibility.

== Political career ==
=== Metropolitan Councilwoman-at-Large ===
Barry was first elected to one of the five at-large seats on the 40-member Metro Council in September 2007, and won re-election to a second four-year term in August 2011. In winning re-election, she was the top vote-getter among the five incumbents who all successfully sought a second term.

During her first term on the council, Barry chaired the council's Budget and Finance Committee and the Education Committee. In 2009, she led an effort in the council to pass a bill banning discrimination against city employees based on sexual orientation and gender identity. During the 2013–2014 council year, she chaired the Rules Committee and served as a member of the Budget and Finance Committee and the Personnel Committee.

Barry performed the first same-sex wedding in Nashville on June 26, 2015.

=== 2015 mayoral campaign ===
Barry started her mayoral campaign in April 2013, filing paperwork with the Davidson County Election Commission naming Nashville attorney Leigh Walton as her campaign's treasurer. She received the largest total of votes for mayor in this election, but did not achieve an absolute majority of votes cast in the race, setting up her runoff race against hedge fund manager David Fox, the second-place finisher. Although major media in Nashville touted apartment landlord Bill Freeman as odds on favorite to win the mayoral election, The Nashvillian newspaper predicted the race would be a runoff between Barry and Fox, then showed Barry taking the early lead in the runoff over Fox. The runoff was noted by many as a particularly dirty campaign, with both candidates launching various personal attacks against the other.

Barry raised US$1.1 million in political contributions during her campaign. She received US$1,500 from Wayne T. Smith, who is the CEO of Community Health Systems; US$1,500 from R. Milton Johnson, who is the CEO of Hospital Corporation of America (HCA); US$5,000 from HCA; US$1,500 from Damon T. Hininger, the CEO of Corrections Corporation of America (CCA); and US$1,500 from CCA's Chairman, John D. Ferguson. Another notable donor was Mike Curb, the founder of Curb Records. She received US$7,600 from the Nashville Business Coalition, a business organization.

Barry defeated Fox in a September 10 runoff election.

=== Mayor of Nashville ===
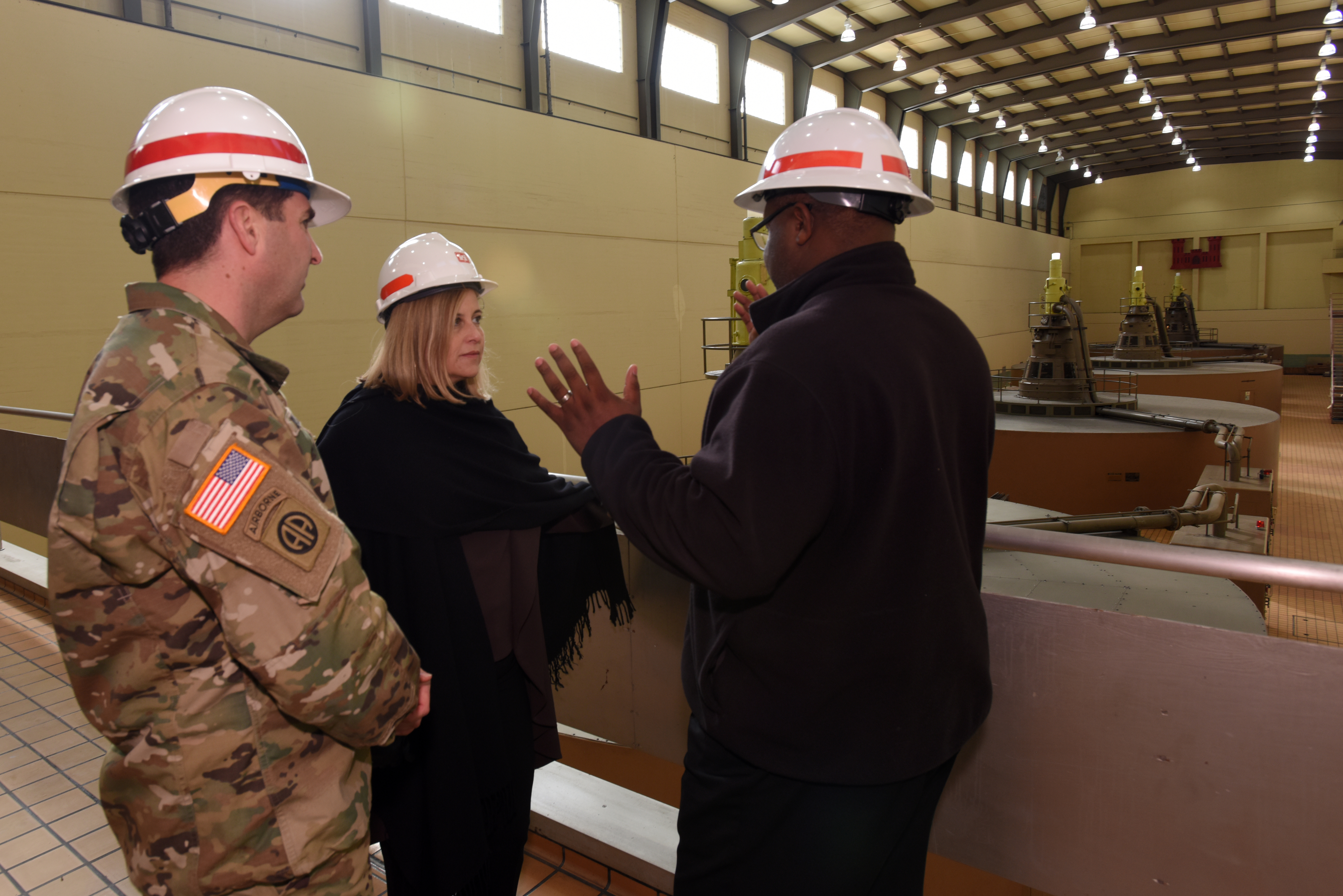
Barry touring the Old Hickory Dam Power Plant with the U.S. Army Corps of Engineers in January 2016.

Barry took office on September 25, 2015, becoming the first woman to hold the post and the second woman to serve as mayor of one of the "Big Four" cities in Tennessee. Her inauguration was held in the Music City Center in Nashville. The theme was "We Make Nashville".

At the beginning of her administration, Barry promoted diversity in Nashville's government – she appointed a Chief Diversity Officer to review and oversee policies as they related to diversity in hiring and promotions within Metro Government. Barry also focused on engaging the community in governing with the Mayor's Office of Neighborhoods and Community Engagement, which includes the Office of New Americans, focused on outreach to immigrant and refugee communities.

In early 2017, she worked with Governor Bill Haslam and the Tennessee General Assembly to promote and pass the IMPROVE Act, which woild increase funding for roadway projects across Tennessee and give voters the chance to create sustainable funding mechanisms for mass transit. Barry announced she would seek to place a referendum on the ballot in 2018 that would create a comprehensive mass transit system throughout all corners of Davidson County, though that initiative later failed to pass a popular vote.

Barry also spent two years improving the state of affordable housing in Nashville. She committed to putting $10 million in her recommended operating budget every year for the Barnes Trust Fund for Affordable Housing, a fund she helped create as a Metropolitan Council of Nashville and Davidson County member. She also created the Housing Incentive Pilot Program in April 2017 to encourage mixed-income residential development, established private-public partnerships for affordable and workforce housing on Metro-owned property, and announced her intention to utilize $25 million in general obligation bonds to preserve existing affordable housing or construct new Metro-owned developments.

One of Barry's accomplishments was the creation and expansion of the Opportunity NOW program, which aimed to reduce the rising rates of youth violence and unemployment by creating 10,000 paid job and internship opportunities for Nashville's teenagers and young adults throughout the private, public and non-profit sectors.

In May 2017, Barry was criticized by Black Lives Matter for her handling of the shooting of Jocques Clemmons – protesters marched through the Hillsboro neighborhood where she lives and left a coffin outside her house.

In May 2017, Barry also announced the opening of an Ikea store in Nashville, scheduled for 2020, which was subsequently cancelled.

On August 29, 2017, Barry dismissed the Council on Biblical Manhood and Womanhood's anti-LGBT Nashville Statement as "poorly named" and unrepresentative of the inclusivity of Nashville and its citizens; in response, she promoted the Community Foundation of Middle Tennessee's Nashville Unites Resolution.

Gun violence for young Nashvillians went up during her tenure, rising up to 21 deaths in January–October 2017. The Tennessean noted that 2017 was "the bloodiest year for teens and children in more than a decade," many of whom were African Americans who lived in city-run housing projects like the James A. Cayce Homes. In response, Barry vowed to "get illegal guns off of our streets and out of the hands of kids and dangerous criminals" and offer more job training for local youths.

In October 2017, Barry unveiled her $5.2 billion plans for expanding Nashville's transportation infrastructure including the addition of light rail service. The final mass transit system plan named "Let's Move Nashville", included 26 miles (42 km) of light rail and 25 miles (40 km) of bus rapid transit, was later rejected 64% to 36% in a local referendum in May 2018.

In December 2017, Barry dedicated the first historical marker in Tennessee to honor an LGBT activist, Penny Campbell, in East Nashville.

==== Theft charges, plea bargain, and resignation ====
On March 6, 2018, following weeks of news coverage and speculation regarding her future, Barry pleaded guilty to a Class C felony in Nashville criminal court as part of a plea bargain related to her extramarital affair with a security officer. Moments after her guilty plea, Barry resigned as mayor. Her successor was David Briley, who had served as vice mayor.

=== 2024 congressional campaign ===
In December 2023, Barry announced that she would run in Tennessee's 7th congressional district against incumbent Republican Mark Green. In February 2024, Green announced that he would not run for reelection amid accusations of infidelity during his divorce proceedings, but changed his mind two weeks later after urging from President Donald Trump, ultimately winning the general election over Barry with approximately 60% of the votes.

== Personal life ==
Barry is married to Bruce Barry, a professor at Vanderbilt University's Owen Graduate School of Management and a contributor to the Tennessee Lookout. The couple had one son, Max. On July 30, 2017, she announced that Max had died of an apparent drug overdose in Denver, Colorado, at 22 years old. Barry is Catholic.

== Extramarital affair and felony charges ==
On January 31, 2018, Barry admitted that she had conducted a two-year long extramarital affair with Nashville Police Sergeant Robert Forrest Jr., the married officer in charge of her security detail. The affair included extended one-on-one business trips. Forrest and Barry attended various events and activities, including late-night concerts and yoga classes, during which Forrest accrued hundreds of overtime hours. Barry maintained that Forrest was not her direct subordinate, and said that she did not want to "muddy the #MeToo movement."

Forrest, two weeks prior to Barry's announcement, filed for retirement from his post as supervisor of mayoral security effective on January 31, the same day Barry admitted to the affair, thus ending his 31-year career with the Nashville Police Department. On February 23, 2018, Forrest's wife of nearly 30 years, Penny, filed for divorce on grounds of "inappropriate marital conduct" soon after the extramarital affair came to light.

In March 2018, Barry entered into a plea agreement that required her resignation. Forrest and Barry, both of whom had no criminal record prior to the affair, pleaded guilty to felony theft. As part of the plea deal, they were ordered to pay restitution ($11,000 for Barry and $45,000 for Forrest) to the city and complete three years of probation. Both Forrest and Barry can petition to have their convictions wiped off their record if they successfully complete their probation. As of August 2018, Barry and her husband remain married and have continued to attend events together.

== Electoral history ==
Tennessee's 7th congressional district election, November 2024
Candidate		Votes	%	±
✓	Mark Green (incumbent)	191,992	59.5	
	Megan Barry	122,764	38	
	Shaun Greene	7,900	2.5	

Nashville mayoral run-off election, September 2015
Candidate		Votes	%	±
✓	Megan Barry	60,519	55	
	David Fox	49,694	45	

Nashville mayoral election, August 2015
Candidate		Votes	%	±
✓	Megan Barry	24,553	23.5	
✓	David Fox	23,754	22.8	
	Bill Freeman	22,308	21.3	
	Howard Gentry	12,110	11.5	
	Charles Robert Bone	10,962	10.5	
	Linda Eskind Rebrovick	5,827	5.6	
	Jeremy Kane	4,767	4.6	

Nashville Council at-large election, August 2011
Candidate		Votes	%	±
✓	Megan Barry	30,212	11.9	
✓	Ronnie Steine	29,262	11.6	
✓	Tim Garrett	28,017	11.1	
✓	Charlie Tygard	26,982	10.7	
✓	Jerry Maynard	25,851	10.2	
	Eric Crafton	20,528	8.1	
	Vivan Wilhoite	17,659	6.9	
	Sam Coleman	15,437	6.1	
	Ken Jakes	12,396	4.9	
	Renard Francois	10,516	4.2	
	Donna Crawford	10,263	4.1	
	Charles Townsend, Sr.	6,972	2.8	
	James "Jim" Maxwell	4,967	2	
	Keith Speer	3,224	1.3	
	Don O'Donniley	3,080	1.2	
	Sajid Usmani	3,064	1.2	
	J Wooten	2,344	0.9	
	Donald Ray McFolin	1,429	0.6	

Barry also ran in the August 2007 Nashville Council at-large election, but those returns are not available from the Davidson County Election Commission. In 2007, Barry won her first term to the Council as an at-large councilwoman.

Political offices
Preceded by Karl Dean	Mayor of Nashville; 2015–2018	Succeeded by David Briley
