= Middle Tennessee =

Geographic and cultural region of Tennessee, United States

Coordinates: 35.8°N 86.6°W

- Grand Division
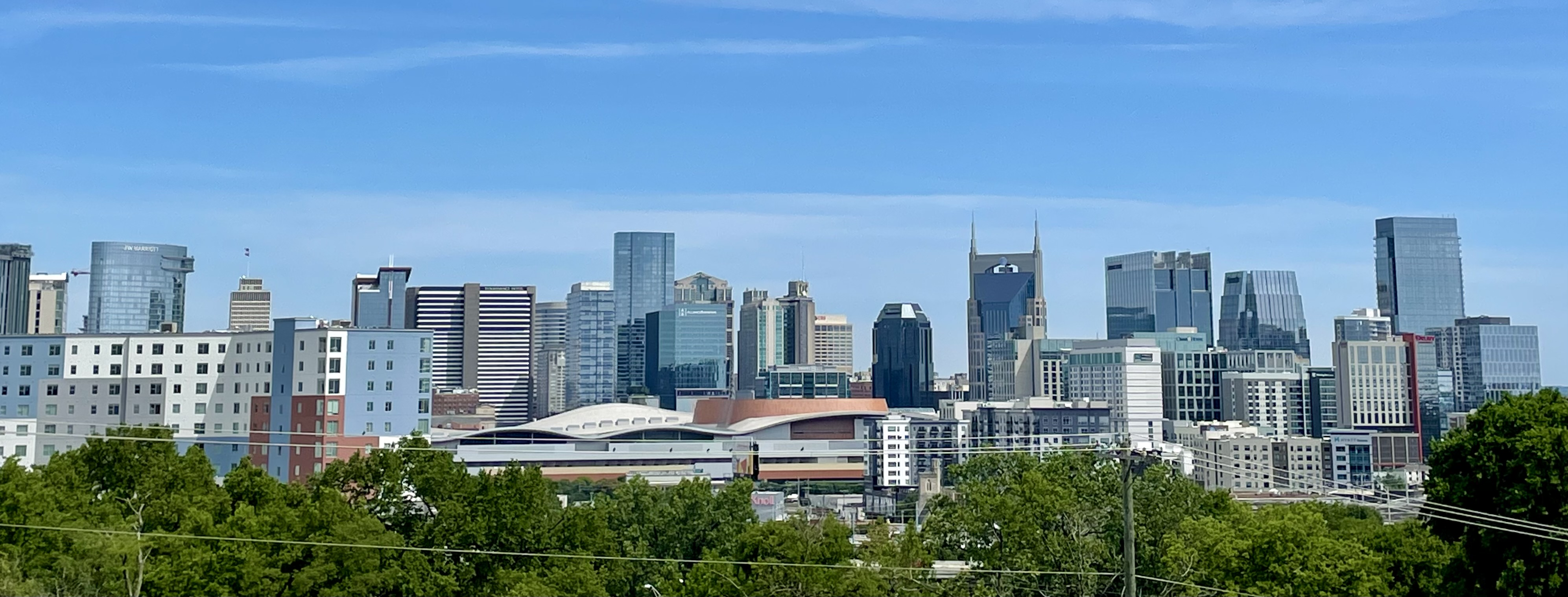
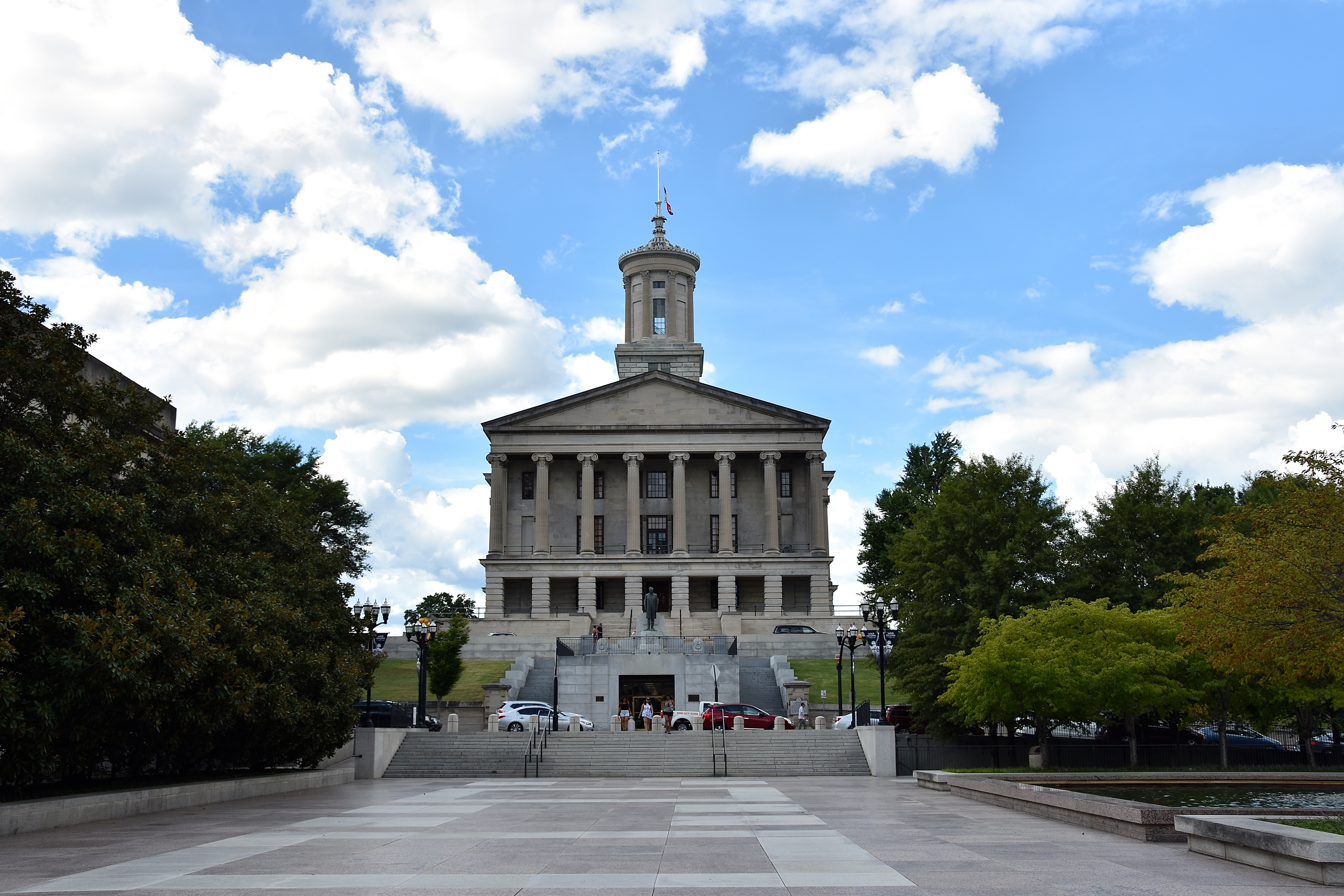
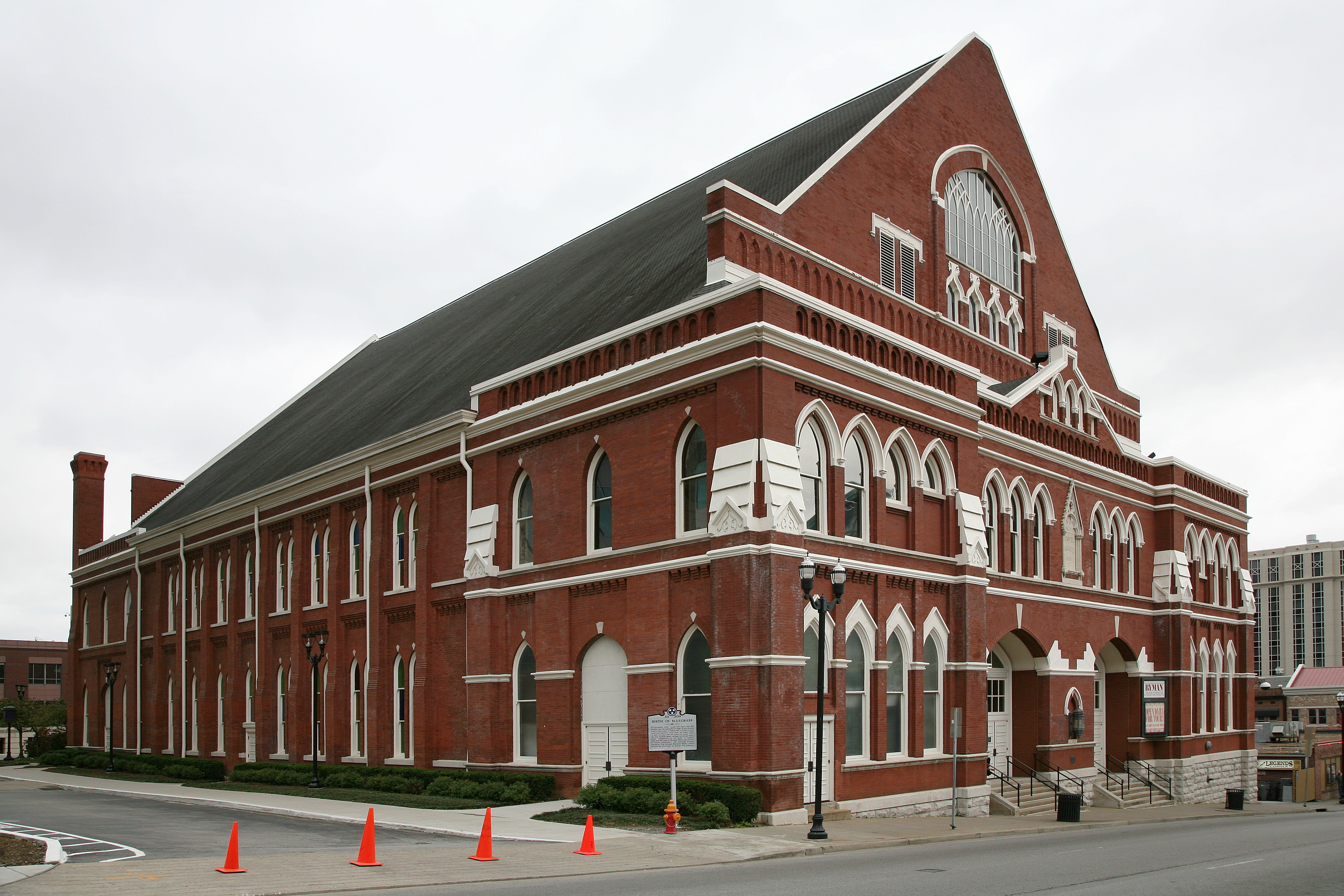
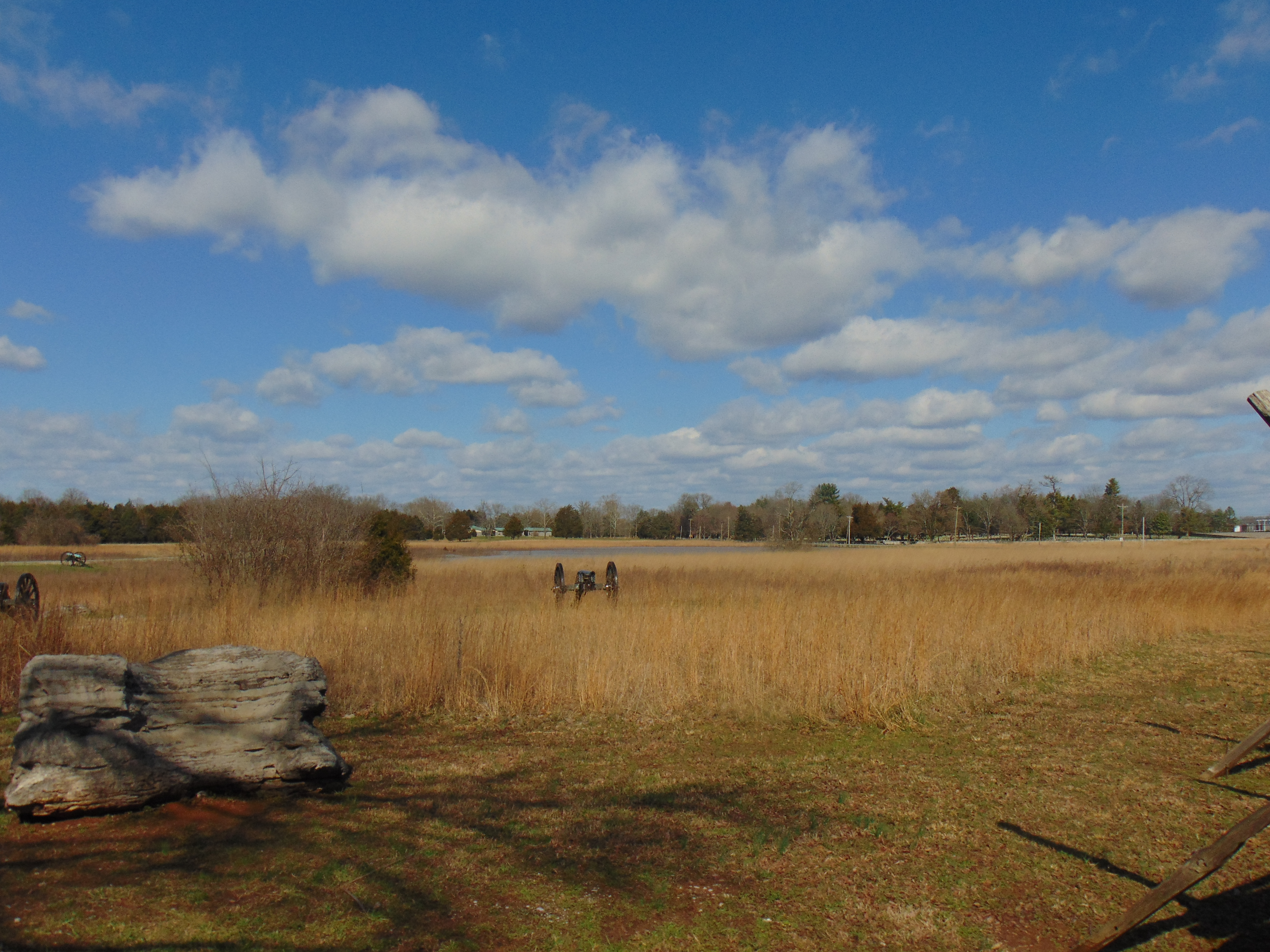
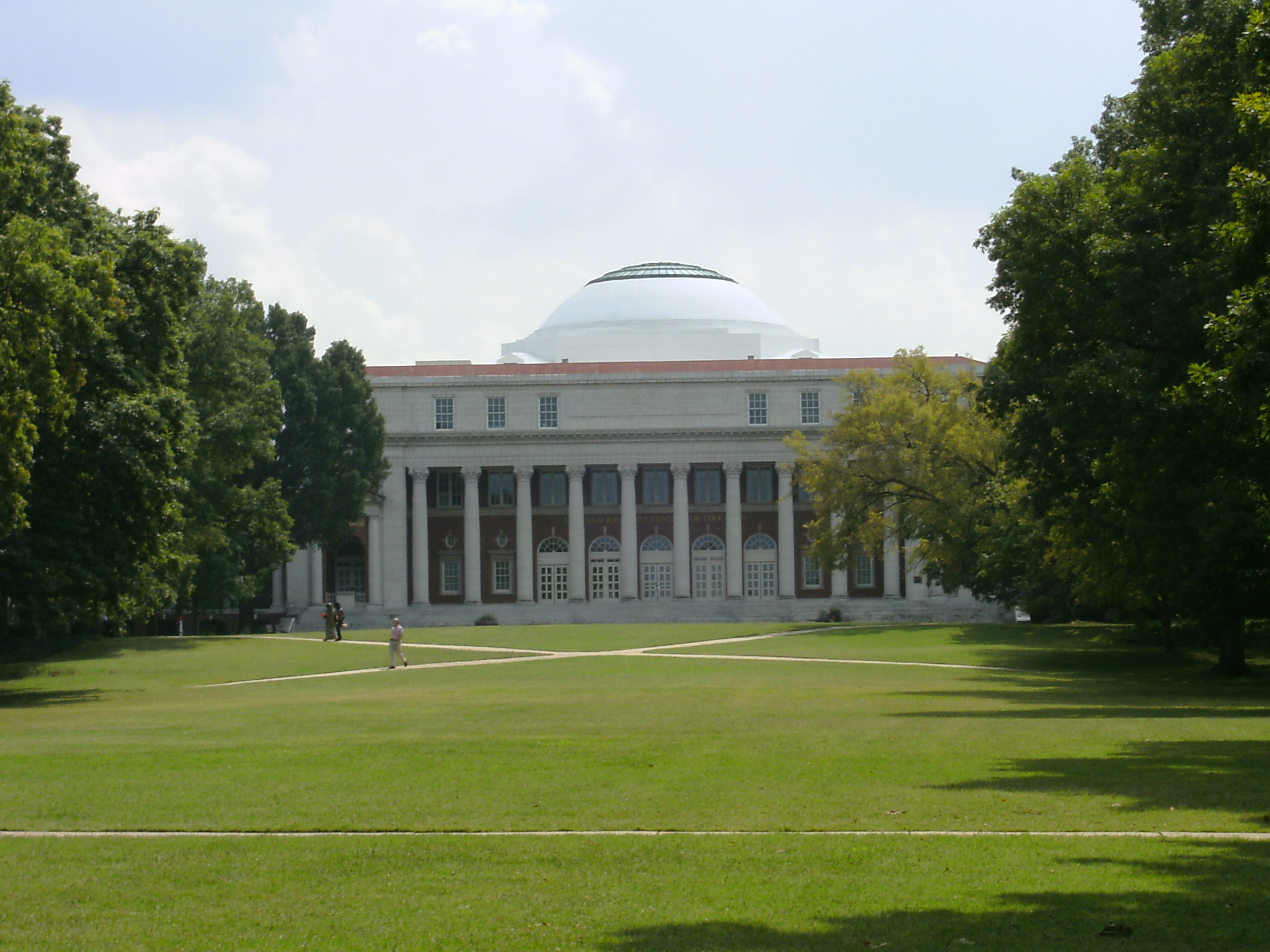
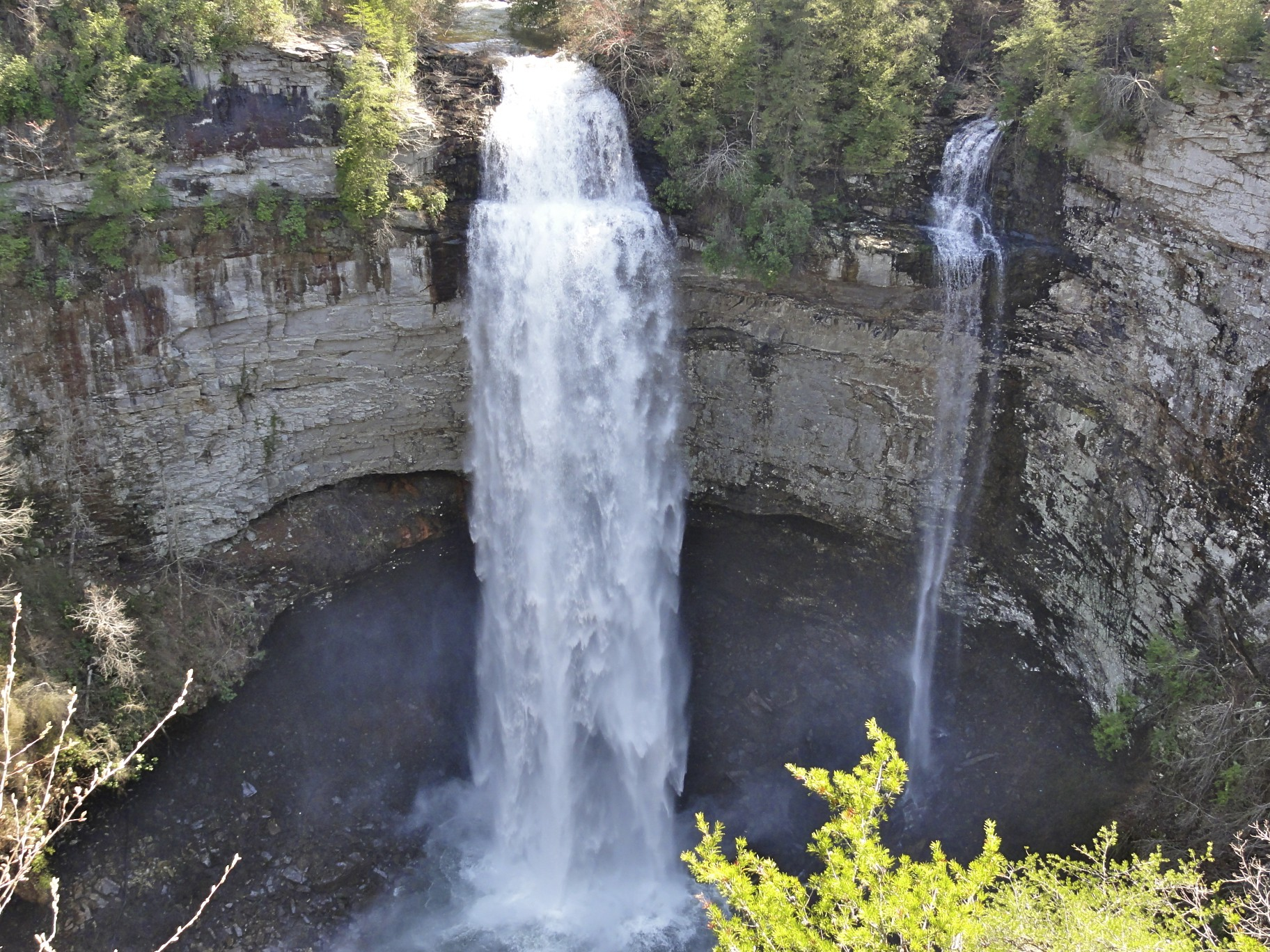
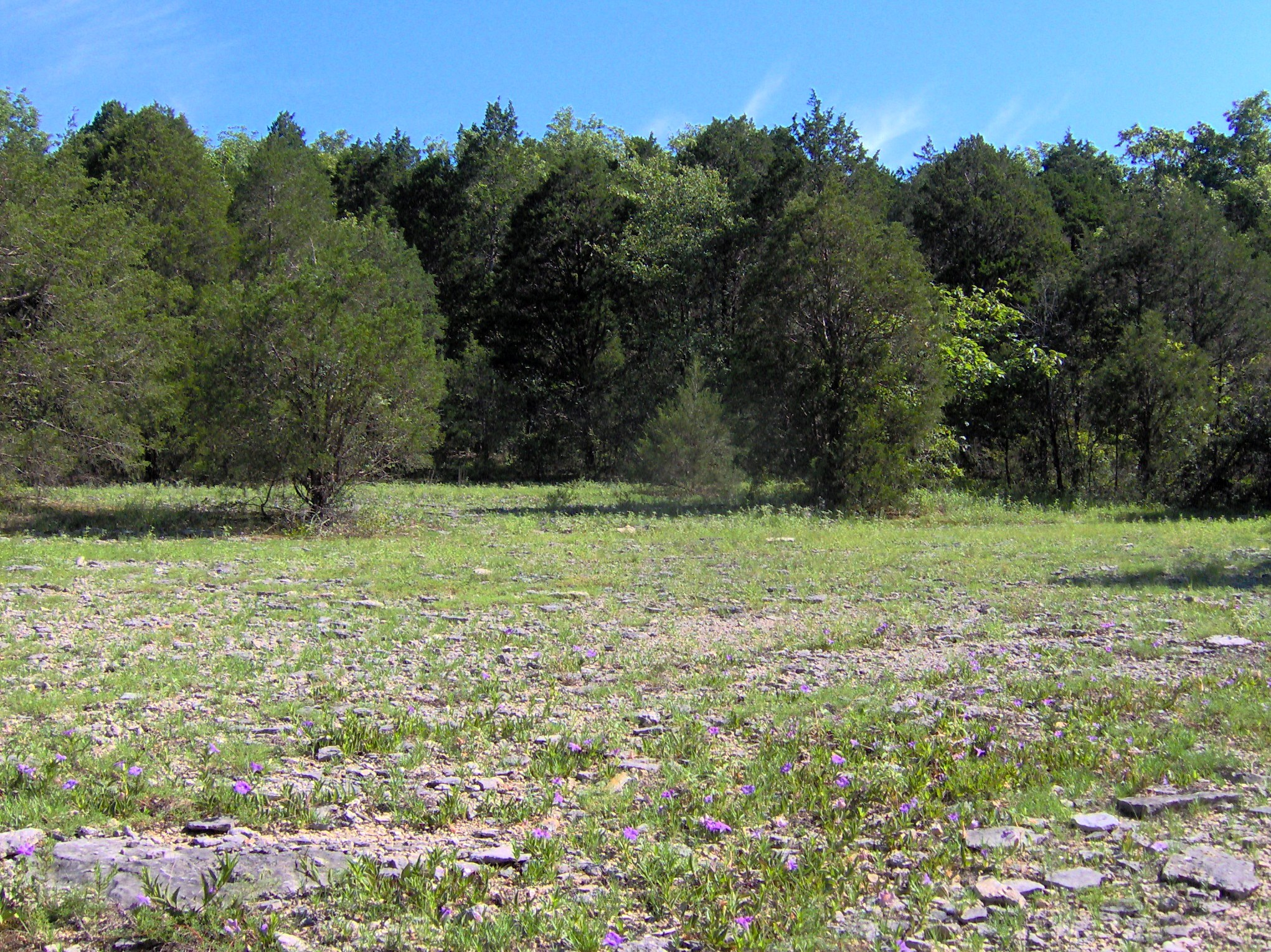
- Images, from top down, left to right: Skyline of Nashville, the Tennessee State Capitol, the Ryman Auditorium, Stones River National Battlefield in Murfreesboro, Vanderbilt University, Fall Creek Falls, Cedars of Lebanon State Park
- Nicknames: Middle TN, Middle Tenn.
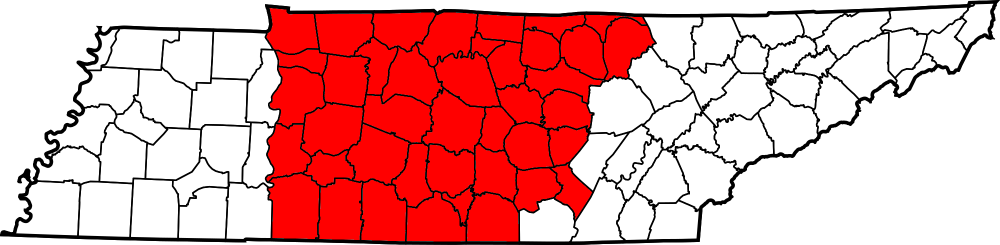
- The counties of Tennessee highlighted in red that are designated part of Middle Tennessee.
- Country: United States
- State: Tennessee
- Largest city: Nashville

Area
  - Land: 17,009.41 sq mi (44,054.2 km^{2})

Population (2020)
  - Total: 2,883,086
  - Density: 169.5/sq mi (65.4/km^{2})
- Demonym: Middle Tennessean
- Area codes: 423, 615, 629, 931

Middle Tennessee is one of the three Grand Divisions of Tennessee that composes roughly the central portion of the state. It is delineated according to state law as 41 of the state's 95 counties. Middle Tennessee contains the state's capital and largest city, Nashville, as well as Clarksville, the state's fifth largest city, and Murfreesboro, the state's sixth largest city and largest suburb of Nashville. The Nashville metropolitan area, located entirely within the region, is the most populous metropolitan area in the state, and the Clarksville metropolitan area is the state's sixth most populous. Middle Tennessee is both the largest, in terms of land area, and the most populous of the state's three Grand Divisions.

Geographically, Middle Tennessee is composed of the Highland Rim, which completely surrounds the Nashville Basin. The Cumberland Plateau is located in the eastern part of the region. Culturally, Middle Tennessee is considered part of the Upland South. Commodity crops such as cotton and tobacco were cultivated by migrant settlers in the region in the antebellum era, who were largely dependent on the labor of enslaved African Americans. In addition, planters bred and trained livestock, such as the world-famous Tennessee Walking Horse, which was developed as a breed in the region during this time.

Middle Tennessee was a crucial region during the American Civil War. Tennessee was occupied by Federal troops from 1862 through the end of the war. Many battles and campaigns were waged by Confederates in this region, especially in efforts to control the major rivers. Confederate General Nathan Bedford Forrest conducted extensive raids through this area, destroying many Union assets in the 1864 Battle of Johnsonville. The bloodiest major battle of the American Civil War by the proportion of engaged soldiers who became casualties, the Battle of Stones River, was also fought here.

In the 20th century, the Grand Ole Opry was established in Nashville, enhancing the city as the home of country music. Since the early 1970s, the region has been transformed by the entry of many new economic sectors, including automotive manufacturing, healthcare, finance, technology, tourism, and professional services. Both the Nashville and Clarksville metropolitan areas are among the fastest-growing regions in the nation.

== History ==
=== Native Americans ===
Throughout the past 10,000 years, a number of different Native peoples are believed to have inhabited what is now Middle Tennessee. The region is believed to have been rich in game animals favored by Ice Age hunter-gatherers. During the Mississippian period (1000–1600 AD), Native Americans established chiefdoms and constructed numerous earthwork mounds in the region, such as Mound Bottom in Cheatham County and the Castalian Springs site in Sumner County. By the late 17th century, for unknown reasons, there were few Native Americans left in Middle Tennessee, but the Cherokee and the Chickasaw claimed the region as their hunting grounds. Natives that had occupied what is now Middle Tennessee prior to this time may have died as a result of new infectious diseases indirectly introduced by European explorers.

=== Exploration and colonization ===
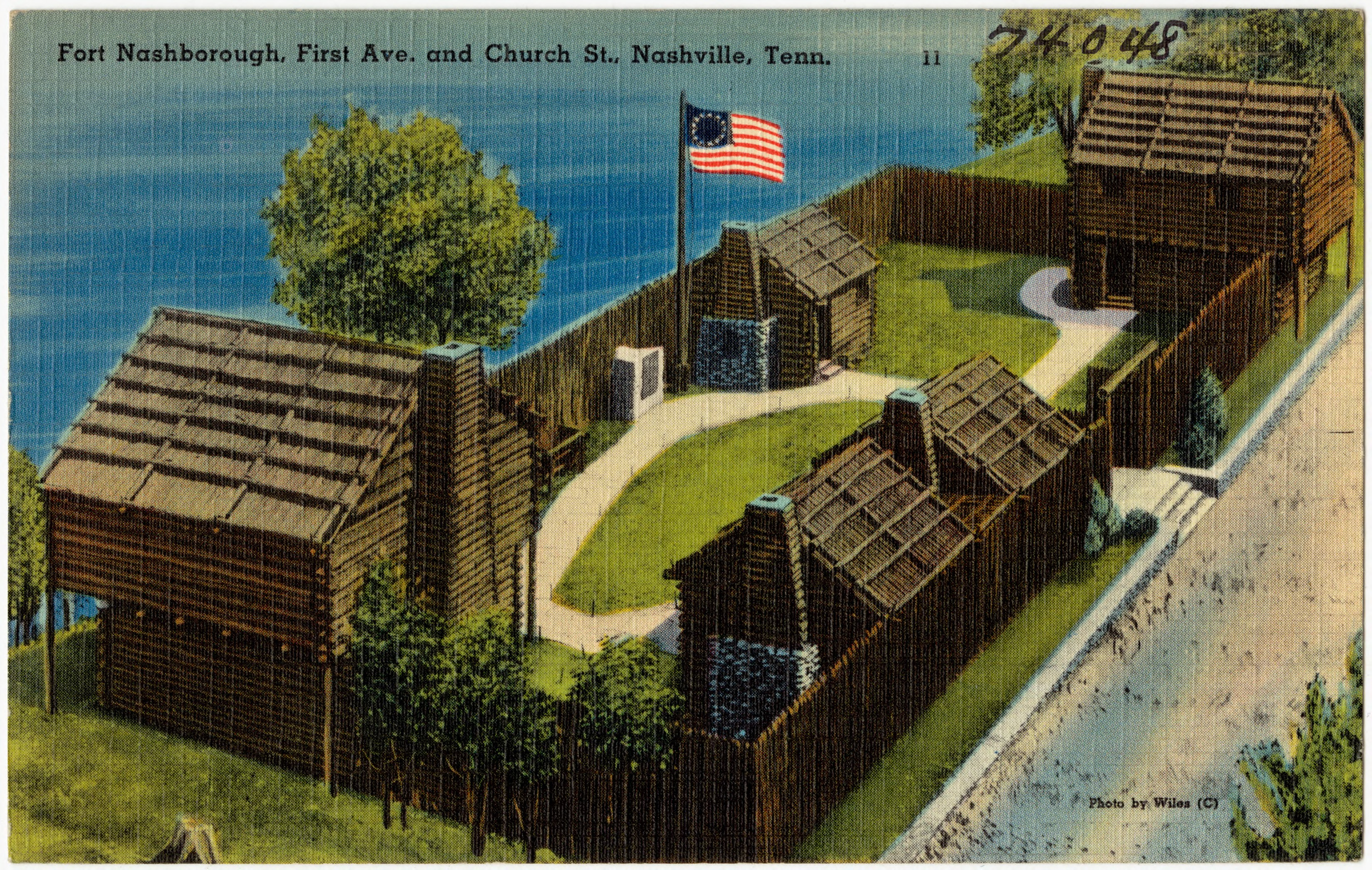
Postcard with an illustration of the reconstruction of Fort Nashborough

The first Europeans to reach what is now Middle Tennessee were probably an expedition in 1540–1541 led by Spanish conquistador Hernando De Soto. By the late 17th century, the French had begun to explore the Cumberland River valley in Middle Tennessee. In 1714, a group of French traders constructed a trading post at a site along the Cumberland River in modern-day Nashville that became known as French Lick. These settlers quickly established an extensive fur trading network with the local Native Americans, but by the 1740s the settlement had largely been abandoned. In the 1750s and 1760s, longhunters from Virginia explored much of Middle Tennessee, especially the Cumberland Plateau. In 1769, French-born fur trader Timothy Demonbreun established residence along the Cumberland River in present-day Nashville.

In 1779, James Robertson and John Donelson led two groups of settlers from the Washington District in what is now East Tennessee to the French Lick. These settlers constructed Fort Nashborough, which they named for Francis Nash, a brigadier general of the Continental Army during the American Revolutionary War. The next year, the settlers signed the Cumberland Compact, which established the Cumberland Association, a representative form of government based on the government known as the Watauga Association that had been established by the settlers of East Tennessee. Fort Nashborough later developed as the city of Nashville, and a number of other settlements were established nearby in the late 18th and early 19th centuries. The first settlements in Middle Tennessee became known as the Cumberland Settlements. In 1790, what is now Tennessee became the Southwest Territory, and the settlements in Middle Tennessee were organized into the Mero District, named after Spanish territorial governor Esteban Rodríguez Miró.

In 1795, a survey conducted by the territorial legislature found that the majority of residents of Middle Tennessee were opposed to statehood, while the majority of residents of East Tennessee, of which there were approximately three times more, were in favor. Tennessee was admitted to the Union as the 16th state the following year. During the antebellum era, a slavery-based agrarian economy took hold in Middle Tennessee, especially in the fertile soils of the Nashville Basin. Planters primarily grew cotton in the Nashville Basin, and tobacco and corn were cultivated in the Highland Rim. By 1860, enslaved African Americans composed about 29% of the population of Middle Tennessee. After the election of Abraham Lincoln that year, a majority of Middle Tennesseans voted against the state's ordinance of secession in February 1861. Many of these white voters supported the continuation of slavery but were skeptical about leaving the Union.

=== Civil War and Reconstruction ===
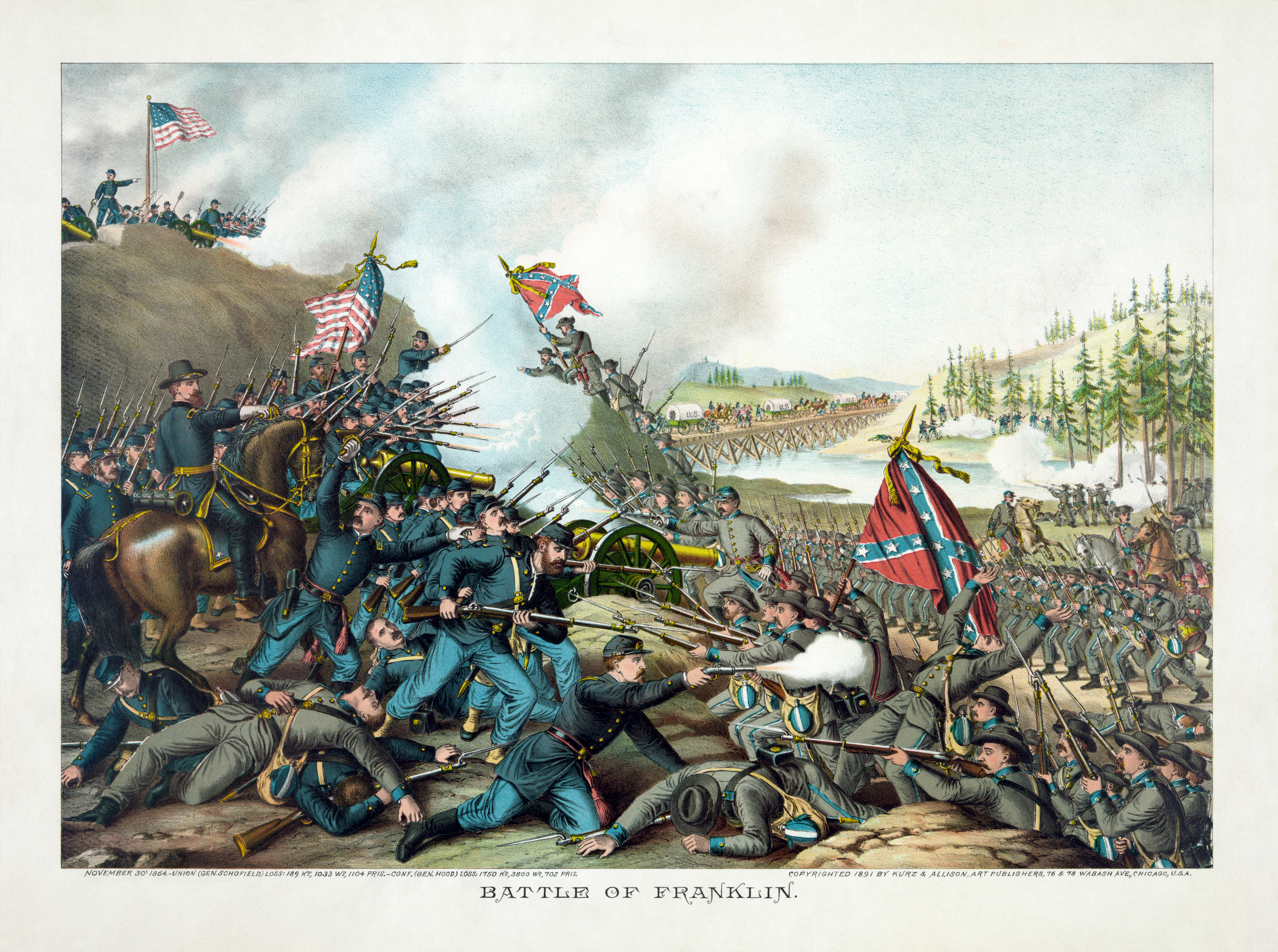
The Battle of Franklin, November 30, 1864

Following the Confederate attack on Fort Sumter in April 1861, which started the Civil War, and President Lincoln's call to raise federal troops in response, many Middle Tennesseans changed their opinions about secession. In June 1861, Middle Tennessee voted in favor of Tennessee's second ordnance of secession, which resulted in Tennessee joining the Confederate States of America (CSA), although a few counties in the extreme southwest (Wayne) and northeast (Macon and Fentress) continued to favor the Union.

A number of crucial campaigns and battles of the Civil War took place in Middle Tennessee. General Ulysses S. Grant and the U.S. Navy captured control of the Tennessee and Cumberland rivers in February 1862 at the battles of Fort Henry and Fort Donelson, essentially establishing Union control of Middle Tennessee. Union troops occupied the state for the duration of the war.

Union strength in the area, however, was tested by a series of Confederate offensives beginning in the summer of 1862, which culminated in Union General William Rosecrans's Army of the Cumberland routing Confederate General Braxton Bragg's Army of Tennessee at the Battle of Stones River in Murfreesboro in December 1862 and January 1863. This was one of the bloodiest battles of the entire war. In February, the Confederates took about 670 to 870 casualties in the Battle of Dover when Colonel Abner C. Harding defeated the 2500 Confederate troops with 800 Union soldiers. The next summer, Rosecrans's Tullahoma campaign forced Bragg's remaining troops in Middle Tennessee to flee to Chattanooga with little fighting. The last major battles in Middle Tennessee occurred during the Franklin–Nashville campaign in the fall of 1864, when the Army of Tennessee under the command of General John Bell Hood unsuccessfully tried to lure Union General William Tecumseh Sherman, who was conducting the Atlanta campaign in Georgia, back into the region. Hood was defeated at the Battle of Franklin in November, then completely dispersed from the state by General George Thomas at the Battle of Nashville the following month. The United States Colored Troops (USCT) played a major role in this campaign.

During Reconstruction, Middle Tennessee's economy fell into a state of disrepair. The Ku Klux Klan was formed in Pulaski in December 1865 as a vigilante organization to advance the interests of former Confederates, including maintenance of white supremacy. In the years following the Civil War, African Americans and their White allies in Middle Tennessee were targeted with acts of violence by former Confederates. Many freedmen (former slaves) became sharecroppers following the end of slavery, and were often disadvantaged by the planters' recordkeeping and contracts.

=== Late 19th and earlier 20th century ===
The post-Reconstruction era in Middle Tennessee was characterized by continued White violence against African Americans, especially related to elections, and many were lynched in a cycle often related to economic tensions and settlement of finances after harvest. In the late 19th century, African Americans began fleeing Middle Tennessee to booming industrial cities in the Northeast and Midwest. This mass migration, which occurred in every Southern state and accelerated between 1915 and 1930, became known as the first wave of the Great Migration. It continued until 1970.

The region's economy continued to be based primarily on agriculture, but coal mining expanded extensively in the Cumberland Plateau in Middle Tennessee in the late 19th and early 20th centuries. In 1897, Tennessee celebrated its centennial of statehood one year late with the Tennessee Centennial and International Exposition in Nashville. A full-scale replica of the Parthenon in Athens was designed by architect William Crawford Smith and constructed for the celebration The site of the exposition is now a city park called Centennial Park.

The worst rail accident in U.S. history occurred on July 9, 1918, in Nashville when two passenger trains collided head on, killing 101 people and injuring 171. Human error was ultimately deemed to be the main cause of the accident.

The Grand Ole Opry was first broadcast in 1925 in Nashville, and remains the longest-running radio program in the nation. This radio program helped establish Nashville as the national home of country music.

During World War II Camp Forrest, located in Tullahoma, was one of the U.S. Army's largest training bases. It was also used to house German, Italian, and Japanese prisoners of war. After the war, it was adapted as Arnold Air Force Base. The Vultee Aircraft Corporation operated a plant in Nashville during the war, employing mostly women.

On February 25 and 26, 1946, a civil disturbance known as the "Columbia Race Riot" occurred in Columbia, instigated by a fight between a Black Navy veteran and a White repair apprentice. Described by the press as the "first major racial confrontation" following World War II, the event garnered national attention. It marked a new era of resistance by African-American veterans and others following their participation in World War II, which they believed had earned them their full rights as citizens.

=== Mid 20th century to present ===
During the early years of the civil rights movement, the Highlander Folk School near Monteagle provided training to a number of activists in the movement, including Martin Luther King Jr., Ralph Abernathy, John Lewis, and Rosa Parks. The Nashville Student Movement was organized as part of workshops on nonviolence taught by activist James Lawson. Between February and May 1960, the group organized a series of sit-ins at segregated lunch counters in Nashville, which successfully resulted in the desegregation of facilities in the city.

The construction of the Interstate Highway System in the latter 20th century facilitated suburbanization in the region and brought new industries to Middle Tennessee. Since 1970, the Nashville and Clarksville metropolitan areas have been two of the fastest-growing regions in the United States. This growth has accelerated since 1990, causing Middle Tennessee to surpass East Tennessee as the most populous of the state's grand divisions in the 2000s. The region's economy has been transformed by new economic sectors, including the automotive, healthcare, banking, technology, and entertainment industries.

== Geography ==
Unlike the geographic designations of regions of most U.S. states, the term "Middle Tennessee" has legal as well as socioeconomic and cultural meaning. Middle Tennessee comprises one of the state's three Grand Divisions, whose boundaries are defined by state law. The others are East Tennessee and West Tennessee, each with distinctive history, geography, and demographics. The total land area of Middle Tennessee is 17,009.41 square miles (44,054.2 km^{2}), representing 41.27% of the state's total land area.

According to custom, Middle Tennessee consists of the portion of the state east of the Tennessee River's western crossing of the state (in which it flows northward back into Tennessee after having flowed through northern Alabama) and west of the dividing line between the Eastern and Central time zones. Exceptions to this rule are that Hardin County, which is bisected by the Tennessee River, is defined by state law to be entirely within West Tennessee and that Bledsoe, Cumberland, and Marion counties are defined as part of East Tennessee despite being in the Central Time Zone. Consequently, Sequatchie County is often considered part of East Tennessee, despite being defined by law as part of Middle Tennessee. Two northeastern counties of Middle Tennessee, Fentress and Pickett, that supported the Union during the American Civil War are sometimes culturally considered part of East Tennessee, which had strongly supported the Union.

=== Topography ===
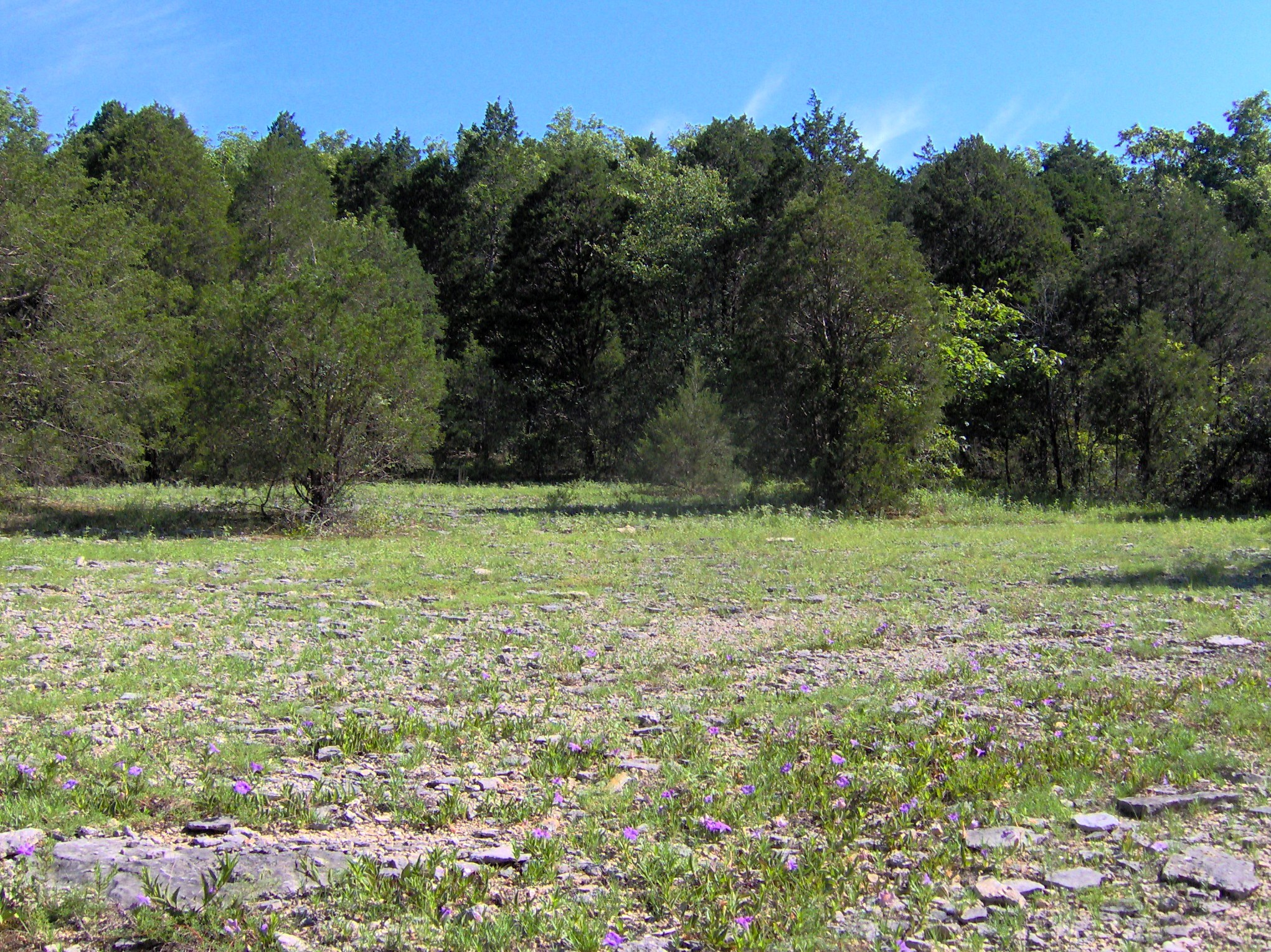
Cedar glades are a rare ecosystem found in the Nashville Basin and Highland Rim, where limestone bedrock is close to the surface

Most of Middle Tennessee is located within the Highland Rim and Nashville Basin, both of which are part of the Interior Low Plateaus of the larger Interior Plains. The Highland Rim is an elevated plain that which completely surrounds the Nashville Basin, a geological dome. Both regions are characterized by porous limestone bedrock that lies close to the surface of the ground. This results in karst, which forms caves, underground streams, sinkholes, and depressions throughout the region.

The Highland Rim is often divided into eastern and western halves. The Eastern Highland Rim is relatively flat, with gentle rolling hills, and the eastern Nashville Basin has similar terrain but is dotted with more distinct hills in places. The western Nashville Basin and Western Highland Rim are more rugged, consisting of irregular knob-like hills separated by steep ravines and crooked stream valleys. The eastern Highland Rim has a higher average elevation, however, than the western portion. The eastern portion of Middle Tennessee consists of the western portion of the Cumberland Plateau, part of the larger Appalachian Plateau of the Appalachian Mountains.

The Cumberland Plateau has an average elevation of 2,000 feet (610 m), and is characterized by flat-topped tablelands separated by long, crooked stream valleys and rocky cliffs with numerous waterfalls. Middle Tennessee's highest elevation, at 2,382 feet (726 m), is found on the Cumberland Plateau in Grundy County.

=== Counties ===
Under the most common definition, the following 41 counties are included in Middle Tennessee:

- Bedford
- Cannon
- Cheatham
- Clay
- Coffee
- Davidson
- DeKalb
- Dickson
- Fentress
- Franklin
- Giles
- Grundy
- Hickman
- Houston
- Humphreys
- Jackson
- Lawrence
- Lewis
- Lincoln
- Macon
- Marshall
- Maury
- Montgomery
- Moore
- Overton
- Perry
- Pickett
- Putnam
- Robertson
- Rutherford
- Sequatchie
- Smith
- Stewart
- Sumner
- Trousdale
- Van Buren
- Warren
- Wayne
- White
- Williamson
- Wilson

The Official Tourism Website of Tennessee has a definition of Middle Tennessee slightly different from the legal definition; the website includes Cumberland County while excluding Grundy and Sequatchie counties.

== Population and demographics ==
Historical population
| Census | Pop. | Note | %± |
|---|---|---|---|
| 1790 | 7,042 | | — |
| 1800 | 32,183 | | 357.0% |
| 1810 | 160,360 | | 398.3% |
| 1820 | 290,674 | | 81.3% |
| 1830 | 381,892 | | 31.4% |
| 1840 | 419,129 | | 9.8% |
| 1850 | 483,179 | | 15.3% |
| 1860 | 504,431 | | 4.4% |
| 1870 | 558,336 | | 10.7% |
| 1880 | 661,870 | | 18.5% |
| 1890 | 708,584 | | 7.1% |
| 1900 | 778,192 | | 9.8% |
| 1910 | 803,672 | | 3.3% |
| 1920 | 828,382 | | 3.1% |
| 1930 | 868,396 | | 4.8% |
| 1940 | 956,659 | | 10.2% |
| 1950 | 1,023,994 | | 7.0% |
| 1960 | 1,105,138 | | 7.9% |
| 1970 | 1,236,614 | | 11.9% |
| 1980 | 1,510,077 | | 22.1% |
| 1990 | 1,684,825 | | 11.6% |
| 2000 | 2,081,346 | | 23.5% |
| 2010 | 2,455,911 | | 18.0% |
| 2020 | 2,883,086 | | 17.4% |
Source: 1910–2020

Middle Tennessee is the largest in area and most populated of the state's three Grand Divisions. At the 2020 census it had 2,883,086 inhabitants living in its 41 counties, an increase of 427,175, or 17.39%, over the 2010 figure of 2,455,911 inhabitants. This represented the region's largest net population increase in history. Its population was 41.72% of the state's total. Its population density was 169.50 inhabitants per square mile (65.44/km^{2}), making it the second-most densely populated Grand Division, behind East Tennessee. Prior to the 2010 census, Middle Tennessee was the second-most populous of the state's Grand Divisions, behind East Tennessee.

=== Cities and metropolitan areas ===
Nashville, the state's capital and largest city, is located in north-central Middle Tennessee. It has nearly 700,000 residents, and anchors a 13-county metropolitan area with about 2 million residents that has been Tennessee's largest since the early 1990s. Clarksville, with a population of about 170,000, is Middle Tennessee's second-largest city and the fifth-largest statewide. It is located in the northwest corner of the region near Kentucky. Murfreesboro, located about 35 miles (56 km) southeast of Nashville, is Middle Tennessee's third-largest city, with more than 150,000 residents. It is also the sixth-largest city in Tennessee and the largest suburb of Nashville. Other important suburbs of Nashville include Franklin, Hendersonville, Smyrna, Spring Hill, Gallatin, Mount Juliet, Lebanon, Columbia, Dickson, and Springfield.

In addition to the Nashville and Clarksville metropolitan areas, Cookeville, located in the eastern part of the region, and Shelbyville, located about 50 miles (80 km) southeast of Nashville, anchor important population centers in Middle Tennessee. Other important cities in the region include Manchester, McMinnville, Tullahoma, Winchester, Lewisburg, and Lawrenceburg.

Largest cities or towns in Middle Tennessee Source:
| Rank | | County | Pop. |
|---|---|---|---|
| 1 | Nashville | Davidson | 689,447 |
| 2 | Clarksville | Montgomery | 166,722 |
| 3 | Murfreesboro | Rutherford | 152,769 |
| 4 | Franklin | Williamson | 83,454 |
| 5 | Hendersonville | Sumner | 61,753 |
| 6 | Smyrna | Rutherford | 53,070 |
| 7 | Spring Hill | Maury | 50,005 |
| 8 | Brentwood | Williamson | 45,373 |
| 9 | Gallatin | Sumner | 44,431 |
| 10 | Columbia | Maury | 41,690 |

== Economy ==
A diversity of sectors drives Middle Tennessee's economy, including music and entertainment, automotive manufacturing, healthcare, and technology. The region's economy is reportedly one of the fastest growing in the United States.

=== Music and entertainment ===
Nicknamed "Music City", Nashville is perhaps best known as the home of country music. The Big Three record labels, as well as numerous independent labels, have offices in Nashville, mostly in the Music Row area. Today, Nashville is the second-largest music recording center, behind New York City. Nashville's music industry is estimated to have a total economic impact of about $10 billion per year and to contribute approximately 56,000 jobs to the Nashville area.

=== Business ===
The largest service industry in Middle Tennessee is healthcare. More than 300 healthcare firms are based in the Nashville area, including Hospital Corporation of America (HCA), the world's largest private operator of hospitals, Community Health Systems, the largest provider of general hospital services in the United States, Envision Healthcare, Vanguard Health Systems, Ardent Health Services, and LifePoint Health. Other important business sectors in the region include banking, finance, insurance, and publishing. The technology sector is also rapidly becoming an important aspect of Middle Tennessee's economy, with such tech giants as Amazon and Oracle pledging investments in the area in 2018 and 2021, respectively, that are expected to employ thousands. Other major corporations headquartered in Middle Tennessee include Caterpillar Inc. in Nashville, Acadia Senior Living in Franklin, Dollar General in Goodlettsville, Tractor Supply Company and Delek US in Brentwood, and Cracker Barrel in Lebanon.

=== Industry ===
Automotive manufacturing is the largest manufacturing sector in Middle Tennessee. Nissan operates an assembly plant in Smyrna, which is the largest automotive assembly plant in North America, and also operates an engine plant in Decherd. General Motors operates an assembly plant in Spring Hill that was formerly the sole manufacturing facility for Saturn Corporation. Nissan relocated its North American headquarters from California to Franklin in 2005, and Mitsubishi Motors did the same in 2019. Bridgestone has its North American corporate headquarters in Nashville, and operates manufacturing facilities throughout the region. Middle Tennessee is home to several automotive parts suppliers scattered throughout the region. Other products manufactured in Middle Tennessee include processed foods, consumer electronics, electrical equipment, computer products, chemicals, and firearms.

=== Agriculture ===
Soybeans and tobacco are grown throughout Middle Tennessee, and beef cattle is raised throughout the region. Middle Tennessee is perhaps best known for its horticultural products and for being a prime breeding ground for horses. Warren County is one of the top producers of nursery products in the nation, and is nicknamed the "Nursery Capitol of the World". The soils of the Nashville Basin reportedly produce grasses which are favorable to horses, and as a result, the region is a top equestrian location. The Tennessee Walking Horse was first bred in the region in the late 18th century and is today one of the most recognized horse breeds in the world. The Cumberland Plateau is a major source of timber, and reportedly ranks as one of the top producers of hardwood in the country.

=== Energy ===
The Tennessee Valley Authority (TVA) provides electric power to Middle Tennessee. TVA operates coal and gas fired plants in the region, including the Cumberland Fossil Plant, Gallatin Fossil Plant, and the Johnsonville Combustion Turbine Plant, as well as several hydroelectric dams. In addition, TVA also purchases power from dams on the Cumberland River and its tributaries operated by the United States Army Corps of Engineers. The largest provider of power to the region, however, is the Browns Ferry Nuclear Plant in northern Alabama, the third-largest nuclear plant in the United States.

=== Tourism ===
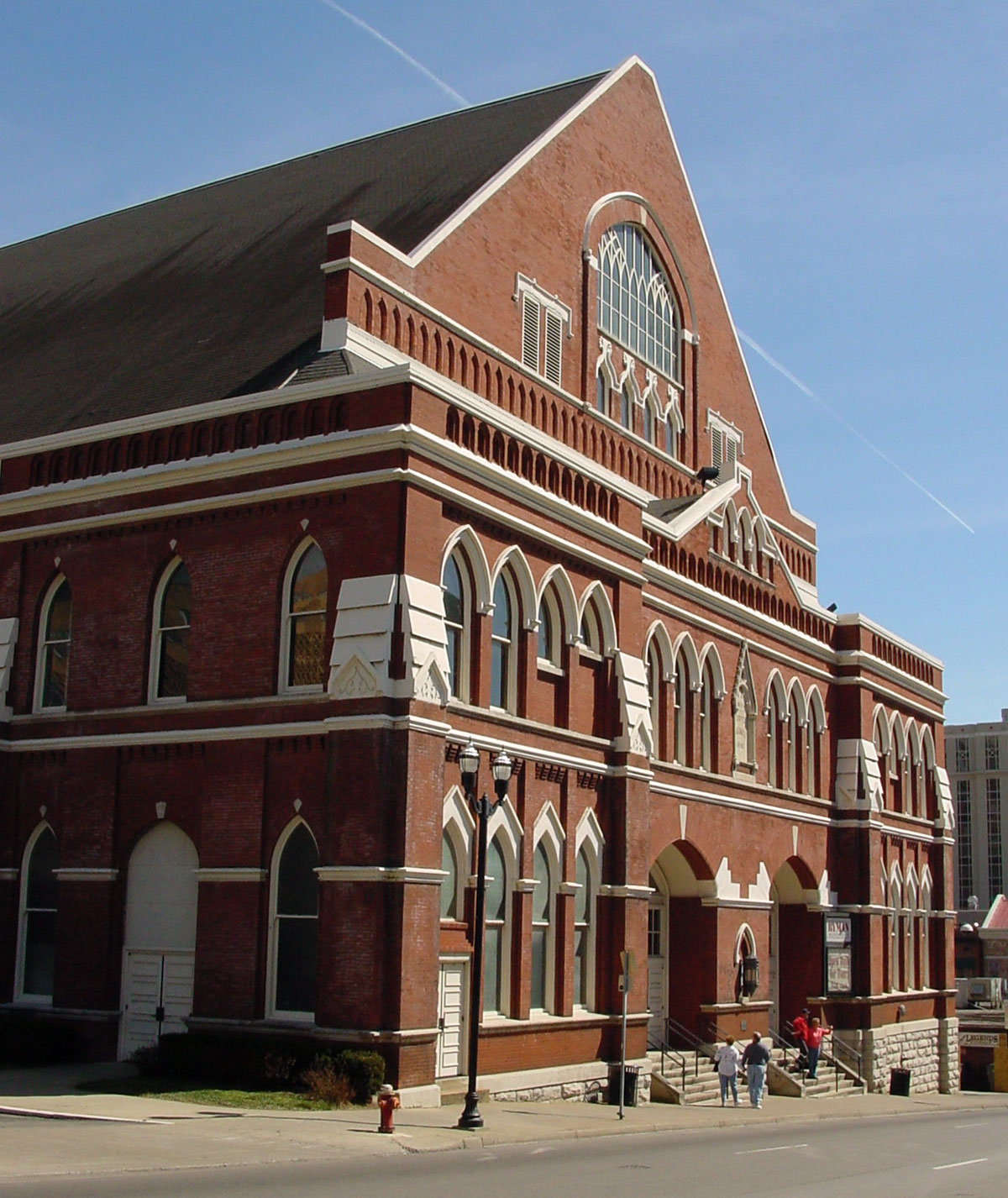
Ryman Auditorium, known as the "Mother Church of Country Music"

Tourism plays a major role in Middle Tennessee's economy. Nashville has the largest tourism economy in the state, and contains many attractions, mostly related to its musical heritage. Top attractions in the region include the Grand Ole Opry, Country Music Hall of Fame and Museum, Ryman Auditorium, Gaylord Opryland Resort & Convention Center, Johnny Cash Museum, National Museum of African American Music, Frist Art Museum, The Parthenon, the Tennessee State Museum, and Jack Daniel's Distillery. A number of antebellum residences are preserved in the region, including The Hermitage, the home of Andrew Jackson, the Belle Meade Plantation, and several homes in Franklin. As well as the President James K. Polk Home & Museum in Columbia. The National Park Service preserves two Civil War battlefields in Middle Tennessee: Fort Donelson National Battlefield near Dover, and Stones River National Battlefield in Murfreesboro. In addition, the American Battlefield Trust operates the Franklin Battlefield. The Natchez Trace Parkway begins in Nashville, and runs through the southwestern part of Middle Tennessee. In addition, the state operates many state parks in Middle Tennessee that preserve historic sites and natural features of the region.

== Education ==
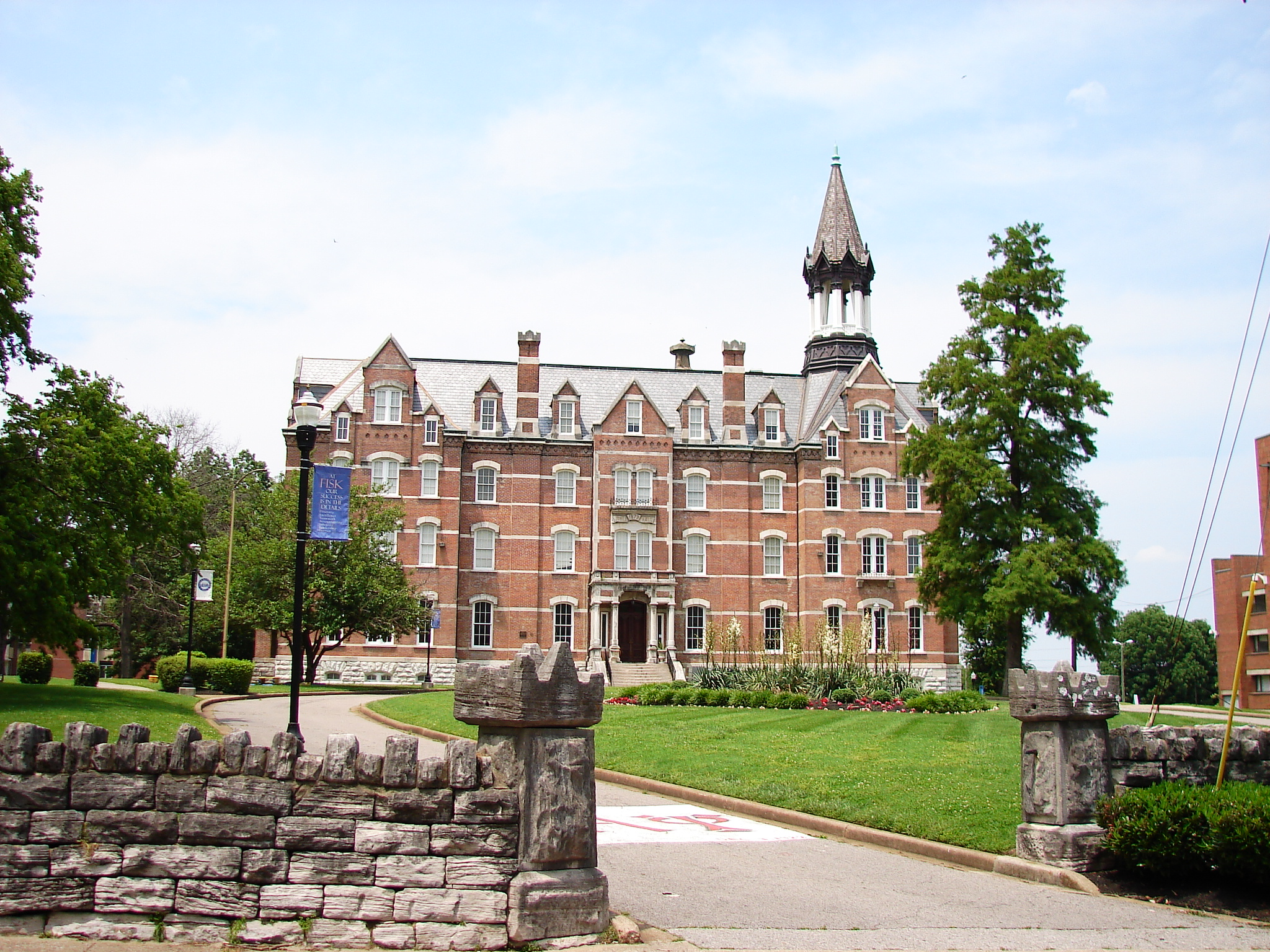
Jubilee Hall, Fisk University

Historically, Middle Tennessee has been a mecca for education in the southern United States. By the 1850s, Nashville earned the nickname “Athens of the South” by becoming the first southern city to establish a public school system. By the end the 19th century, Nashville had become host to numerous higher education institutions including both prominent historically black universities (HBCUs) such as Fisk University and Meharry Medical College, as well as Belmont University and Vanderbilt University which served Whites only. Today Nashville is also host to Tennessee State (HBCU), Lipscomb, and Trevecca. Nashville is home to more HBCUs than any city other than Atlanta, Georgia.

Outside of Nashville, Middle Tennessee features many other large universities. These include Middle Tennessee State University in Murfreesboro, Tennessee Tech University in Cookeville, Austin Peay State University in Clarksville, the University of the South in Sewanee, Cumberland University in Lebanon, and University of Tennessee Southern in Pulaski. Despite the wealth of universities in Middle Tennessee, the only high research output (R1 university) is Vanderbilt.

== Legal structure ==
Unlike the geographic designations of regions of most U.S. states, the term Middle Tennessee has legal as well as socioeconomic meaning. Middle Tennessee, West Tennessee, and East Tennessee are the state's three Grand Divisions. According to the Tennessee State Constitution, no more than two of the state supreme court's five justices can come from any one Grand Division. The Supreme Court rotates meeting in courthouses in each of the three divisions. The Supreme Court building for Middle Tennessee is in Nashville. A similar rule applies to certain other commissions and boards, in order to prevent a geographic bias.

== Climate ==
Climate data for Nashville (Nashville Int'l), 1991–2020 normals, (Note: Mean monthly maxima and minima (i.e. the expected highest and lowest temperature readings at any point during the year or given month) calculated based on data at said location from 1991 to 2020.) extremes 1873−present (Note: Official records for Nashville were kept at downtown from December 1973 to December 1939, and at Nashville Int'l since January 1940. For more information, see Threadex)
| Month | Jan | Feb | Mar | Apr | May | Jun | Jul | Aug | Sep | Oct | Nov | Dec | Year |
|---|---|---|---|---|---|---|---|---|---|---|---|---|---|
| Record high °F (°C) | 78 (26) | 85 (29) | 89 (32) | 91 (33) | 96 (36) | 109 (43) | 107 (42) | 106 (41) | 105 (41) | 99 (37) | 88 (31) | 79 (26) | 109 (43) |
| Mean maximum °F (°C) | 68.5 (20.3) | 73.3 (22.9) | 80.1 (26.7) | 85.3 (29.6) | 89.9 (32.2) | 94.7 (34.8) | 97.1 (36.2) | 96.7 (35.9) | 93.4 (34.1) | 86.4 (30.2) | 78.1 (25.6) | 69.6 (20.9) | 98.5 (36.9) |
| Mean daily maximum °F (°C) | 49.1 (9.5) | 53.8 (12.1) | 62.7 (17.1) | 72.6 (22.6) | 80.4 (26.9) | 87.7 (30.9) | 90.9 (32.7) | 90.4 (32.4) | 84.4 (29.1) | 73.5 (23.1) | 61.4 (16.3) | 52.2 (11.2) | 71.6 (22.0) |
| Daily mean °F (°C) | 39.6 (4.2) | 43.4 (6.3) | 51.5 (10.8) | 60.8 (16.0) | 69.3 (20.7) | 77.1 (25.1) | 80.7 (27.1) | 79.7 (26.5) | 73.1 (22.8) | 61.7 (16.5) | 50.3 (10.2) | 42.7 (5.9) | 60.8 (16.0) |
| Mean daily minimum °F (°C) | 30.1 (−1.1) | 33.0 (0.6) | 40.2 (4.6) | 48.9 (9.4) | 58.3 (14.6) | 66.4 (19.1) | 70.5 (21.4) | 69.0 (20.6) | 61.8 (16.6) | 49.9 (9.9) | 39.2 (4.0) | 33.3 (0.7) | 50.1 (10.1) |
| Mean minimum °F (°C) | 11.2 (−11.6) | 15.4 (−9.2) | 22.7 (−5.2) | 32.7 (0.4) | 43.1 (6.2) | 55.2 (12.9) | 62.4 (16.9) | 60.2 (15.7) | 47.3 (8.5) | 33.3 (0.7) | 23.5 (−4.7) | 17.4 (−8.1) | 9.0 (−12.8) |
| Record low °F (°C) | −17 (−27) | −13 (−25) | 2 (−17) | 23 (−5) | 34 (1) | 42 (6) | 51 (11) | 47 (8) | 36 (2) | 26 (−3) | −1 (−18) | −10 (−23) | −17 (−27) |
| Average precipitation inches (mm) | 4.02 (102) | 4.47 (114) | 4.52 (115) | 4.72 (120) | 5.02 (128) | 4.36 (111) | 4.16 (106) | 3.79 (96) | 3.80 (97) | 3.36 (85) | 3.86 (98) | 4.43 (113) | 50.51 (1,283) |
| Average snowfall inches (cm) | 2.0 (5.1) | 1.5 (3.8) | 0.7 (1.8) | 0.0 (0.0) | 0.0 (0.0) | 0.0 (0.0) | 0.0 (0.0) | 0.0 (0.0) | 0.0 (0.0) | 0.0 (0.0) | 0.1 (0.25) | 0.4 (1.0) | 4.7 (12) |
| Average precipitation days (≥ 0.01 in) | 10.8 | 10.9 | 11.6 | 11.2 | 11.6 | 10.7 | 10.3 | 9.4 | 7.8 | 8.4 | 9.0 | 11.4 | 123.1 |
| Average snowy days (≥ 0.1 in) | 2.0 | 1.9 | 0.9 | 0.0 | 0.0 | 0.0 | 0.0 | 0.0 | 0.0 | 0.0 | 0.2 | 0.5 | 5.5 |
| Average relative humidity (%) | 70.4 | 68.5 | 64.6 | 63.2 | 69.5 | 70.4 | 72.8 | 73.1 | 73.7 | 69.4 | 70.2 | 71.4 | 69.8 |
| Average dew point °F (°C) | 26.4 (−3.1) | 29.5 (−1.4) | 36.9 (2.7) | 45.1 (7.3) | 55.9 (13.3) | 63.9 (17.7) | 68.0 (20.0) | 66.9 (19.4) | 61.2 (16.2) | 48.4 (9.1) | 39.4 (4.1) | 31.3 (−0.4) | 47.7 (8.7) |
| Mean monthly sunshine hours | 139.6 | 145.2 | 191.3 | 231.5 | 261.8 | 277.7 | 279.0 | 262.1 | 226.4 | 216.8 | 148.1 | 130.6 | 2,510.1 |
| Percentage possible sunshine | 45 | 48 | 52 | 59 | 60 | 64 | 63 | 63 | 61 | 62 | 48 | 43 | 56 |
| Average ultraviolet index | 2 | 4 | 6 | 7 | 9 | 10 | 10 | 9 | 7 | 5 | 3 | 2 | 6 |
Source 1: NOAA (relative humidity, dew point, and sun 1961−1990)
Source 2: Weather Atlas (UV index) WMO

The weather in Nashville is a decent mix of extremes. Plenty of sunshine in the summer, and crisp, cold air throughout the winter.

== Transportation ==
=== Roads ===
Interstate 40 (I-40) traverses Middle Tennessee in an east to west alignment, passing through Nashville and its suburbs to the east. Interstate 65 (I-65) runs north to south through the region, serving Nashville and its suburbs to the north and south, including Brentwood, Franklin, and Spring Hill. Interstate 24 (I-24) enters the region in Clarksville and runs in a southeast to northwest alignment, passing through Nashville and its southeastern suburbs of La Vergne, Smyrna, and Murfreesboro, before exiting the region in the southeast. I-440 serves as a bypass around downtown Nashville, and I-840 is an outer bypass around Nashville, passing through suburban counties to the south. Other important freeways in Middle Tennessee include State Route 155 (SR 155/Briley Parkway), a northern bypass around downtown Nashville; Ellington Parkway, part of U.S. Route 31E (US 31E) in Nashville; SR 386 (Vietnam Veterans Boulevard), which serves Nashville's northwestern suburbs of Hendersonville and Gallatin; and SR 396 (Saturn Parkway), which connects Spring Hill and its General Motors plant to I-65. Middle Tennessee also has several other important corridors that are part of the National Highway System (NHS), including U.S. Routes 43, 64, 70S, 79, and 231, and State Routes 55 and 111.

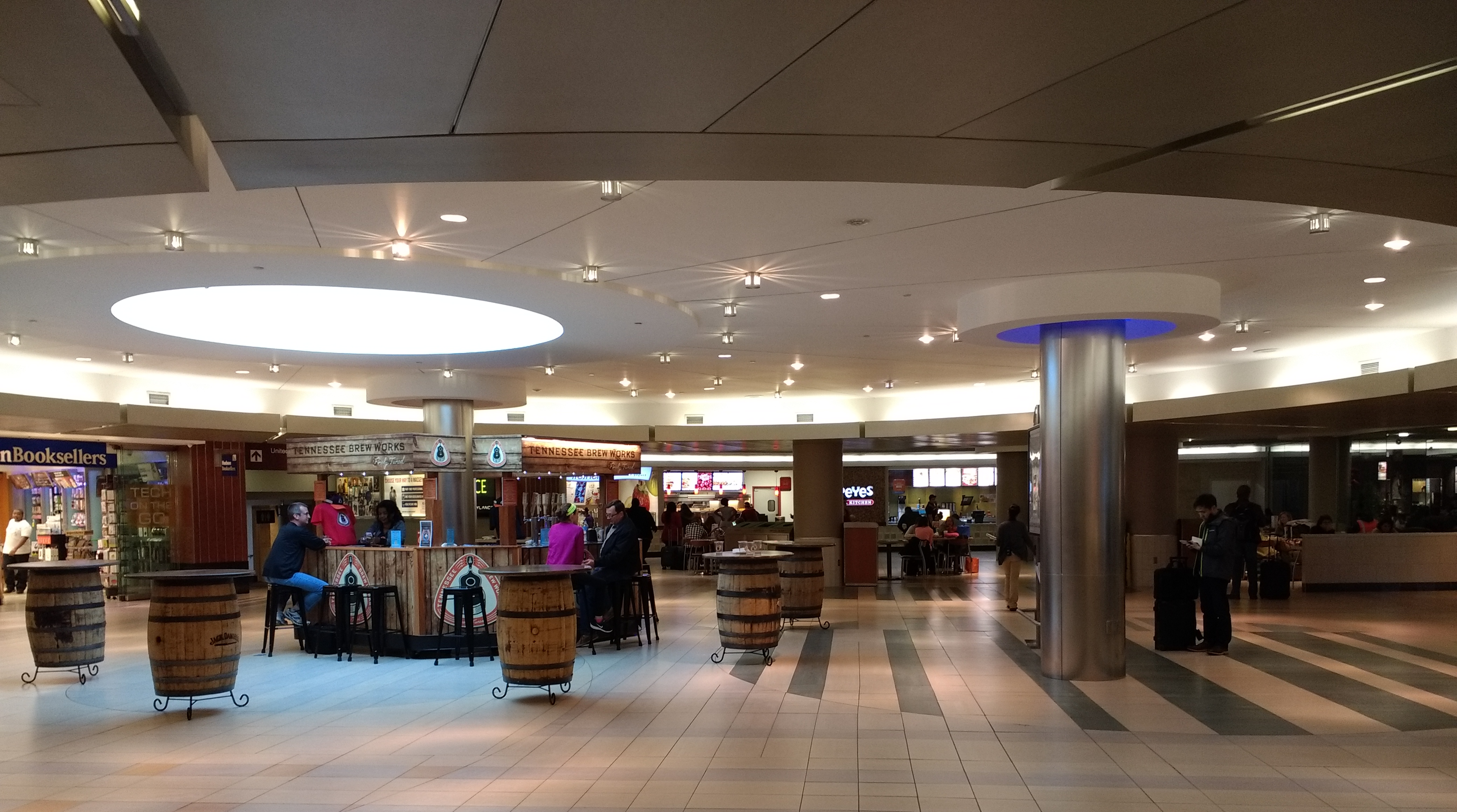
Interior of the terminal of the Nashville International Airport

=== Air, rail, and water ===
Nashville International Airport (BNA) is the region's primary airport and the busiest airport in Tennessee. The WeGo Star is a single line commuter rail service, with stops in Mt. Juliet and Lebanon, Nashville's eastern suburbs. CSX Transportation operates most freight trackage in Middle Tennessee, and runs a classification yard in Nashville called Radnor Yard. Both the Cumberland and Tennessee rivers are navigable in Middle Tennessee.

== Politics ==
Middle Tennessee vote by party in presidential elections
| Year | GOP | DEM | Others |
|---|---|---|---|
| 2024 | 62.84% 823,801 | 35.75% 468,619 | 1.41% 18,564 |
| 2020 | 59.20% 756,984 | 38.67% 494,567 | 2.13% 27,243 |
| 2016 | 59.68% 601,726 | 35.21% 354,980 | 5.11% 51,519 |
| 2012 | 60.3% 565,563 | 39.7% 372,777 |
| 2008 | 56.29% 562,182 | 42.31% 422,589 | 1.40% 13,937 |

Historically, Middle Tennessee was predominately Democratic following the American Civil War, but the significant minority of African Americans joined the Republican Party. The white-dominated state legislature in the 1880s passed four laws that effectively disenfranchised most blacks and many poor whites, particularly due to the requirement of payment of a poll tax in order to register to vote, which reduced the competitiveness of the Republican Party in this part of the state.

=== Government ===
Middle Tennessee is represented by the 4th, 5th, 6th, and 7th congressional districts.

The Supreme Court building for Middle Tennessee is in Nashville. Similar rules apply to certain other state commissions and boards, as well, to prevent them from showing any geographical biases.

=== Mayoral elections in Middle Tennessee ===
- Mayoral elections in Clarksville, Tennessee
- Mayoral elections in Murfreesboro, Tennessee

=== Nashville ===
- 2015 Nashville mayoral election
- 2018 Nashville mayoral special election
- 2019 Nashville mayoral election
- 2023 Nashville mayoral election

== Bibliography ==
- Albright, Edward (1909). Early History of Middle Tennessee. Nashville: Brandon Printing Company. pp. 18–19. ISBN 1166645126 – via Google Books.
- Connelly, Thomas Lawrence (1979). Civil War Tennessee: Battles and Leaders. Knoxville: University of Tennessee Press. ISBN 9780870492617 – via Google Books.
- Corlew, Robert E.; Folmsbee, Stanley E.; Mitchell, Enoch (1981). Tennessee: A Short History (2nd ed.). Knoxville: University of Tennessee Press. ISBN 9780870496479 – via Internet Archive.
- Finger, John R. (2001). Tennessee Frontiers: Three Regions in Transition. Indiana University Press. ISBN 978-0-253-33985-0.
- Lamon, Lester C. (1980). Blacks in Tennessee, 1791–1970. University of Tennessee Press. ISBN 978-0-87049-324-9.
- Langsdon, Phillip R. (2000). Tennessee: A Political History. Franklin, Tennessee: Hillboro Press. ISBN 9781577361251 – via Internet Archive.
