= TJC =

TJC may refer to:

- Tennessee Justice Center, a non-profit advocacy organization and a law firm
- The Jewish Channel, a cable television channel
- The Joint Commission, a non-profit tax exempt organization in Illinois, United States
- Tibet Justice Center, an American legal association
- Transitional Justice Commission, an independent government agency of Taiwan
- True Jesus Church, the largest Oneness Pentecostal church in China

== Educational institutions ==
- Temasek Junior College, a co-educational junior college in Singapore
- Tokyo Jogakkan College, a private women's college in Tokyo, Japan
- Tyler Junior College, a public community college in Texas, United States

== Businesses ==
- TJC L.P., an American private equity firm
- Tokuma Japan Communications, a publishing company
- The Jewellery Channel, a British TV shopping channel
