= Anthony Davis (politician) =

American politician (born 1980)

Member of the Tennessee House of Representatives from the 51st district
- In office June 20, 2023 – October 4, 2023
- Appointed by: Nashville Metro Council
- Preceded by: Bill Beck
- Succeeded by: Aftyn Behn

Member of the Nashville Metro Council from the 7th district
- In office 2011–2019
- Preceded by: Erik Cole
- Succeeded by: Emily Benedict

Personal details
- Born: August 8, 1980 (age 45)
- Party: Democratic
- Children: 2
- Education: Lambuth University (BBA)

Anthony Davis (born August 8, 1980) is an American politician from Tennessee. He is a Democrat and represented District 51 in the Tennessee House of Representatives from June to October 2023. Davis attended Martin Luther King Magnet at Pearl High School and received a marketing degree from Lambuth University. He represented District 7 on the Nashville Metro Council from 2011 to 2019. Davis established the East Nashville Beer Works craft brewery in 2016. Following the death of Representative Bill Beck, the Nashville Metro Council appointed Davis to represent the 51st district until a special election could be held; he was defeated in the August 3 primary by Aftyn Behn.

== Personal life ==
Davis lives in Nashville with his partner Kim and their two children.
