= Bill Beck (politician) =

American politician (1962–2023)

Member of the Tennessee House of Representatives from the 51st district
- In office January 13, 2015 – June 4, 2023
- Preceded by: Mike Turner
- Succeeded by: Anthony Davis

Personal details
- Born: Carson William Beck; March 21, 1962
- Died: June 4, 2023 (aged 61) Nashville, Tennessee, U.S.
- Party: Democratic
- Spouse: Pamela Beck
- Children: 1
- Education: Belmont University (BBA); Nashville School of Law (JD)
- Occupation: Attorney

Carson William Beck (March 21, 1962 – June 4, 2023) was an American lawyer and politician. He was a member of the Tennessee House of Representatives from 2015 until his death in 2023. A member of the Democratic Party, he represented District 51, which is composed of parts of Davidson County and includes Old Hickory, Madison, Inglewood, East Nashville, Downtown, The Gulch, Germantown, and Salemtown.

== Early life and education ==
Beck attended Belmont University where he received his bachelor's degree in Business Administration, in 1985. Representative Beck then attended Nashville School of Law, where he received his Doctor of Jurisprudence, in 1989. He worked as a personal injury attorney in Nashville.

== Political career ==
During the Democrats primary election in 2014, Representative Beck won with 41.1% over Jennifer Buck Wallace with 34.6% and Stephen Fotopulos with 24.3%. In the general election, Representative Beck won with 71.8% over Republican challenger Brian L. Mason who received only 28.2% of the vote. Representative Beck defeated Trey Palmedo in the Democratic primary on August 2, 2018. Beck defeated independent candidate and father's rights advocate, Randell Stroud (Independent) on November 6, 2018, in the general election. Beck received 82% of the general vote whereas Stroud received 18% of the General vote.

== Personal life ==
Beck lived in Nashville with his wife Pamela, and they had one daughter.

On April 17, 2015, Beck was pulled over by police while driving in Nashville, after officers spotted him driving with the two left wheels of his truck in a turn lane. An affidavit noted that Beck appeared disheveled, and officer reported that his eyes were "bloodshot and watery", his speech was "extremely slurred", and there was an "odor of an alcoholic beverage coming from his person". After refusing to complete a sobriety test, he was arrested for driving under the influence and violating implied consent laws. Beck denied consuming any alcohol. On July 28, a judge dismissed the charges, saying that Beck's driving did not meet a level of reasonable suspicion that would have justified a traffic stop.

Beck died from a heart attack on June 4, 2023, at the age of 61.

Tennessee House of Representatives
| Preceded by Mike Turner | Tennessee State Representative, 51st District; 2014–2023 | Succeeded by Anthony Davis |
