= C. Robb Robinson =

American politician

Member of the Tennessee House of Representatives from the 51st district
- In office 1970–2000
- Succeeded by: Mike Turner

Personal details
- Born: May 18, 1922 Nashville, Tennessee, U.S.
- Died: November 9, 2006 (aged 84) Nashville, Tennessee, U.S.
- Party: Democratic
- Occupation: Businessman, politician

Charles Robb Robinson (May 18, 1922 – November 9, 2006), was an American politician in the state of Tennessee. Robinson served in the Tennessee House of Representatives as a Democrat from the 51st District from 1970 to 2000.
