= 2023 Nashville mayoral election =

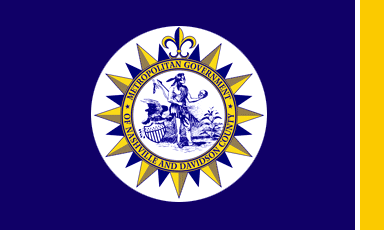
- August 3, 2023 (first round); September 14, 2023 (runoff); Officially nonpartisan
- Turnout: 20.52% ▼ (first round) 0.44 pp 23.02% ▲ (runoff) 2.50 pp
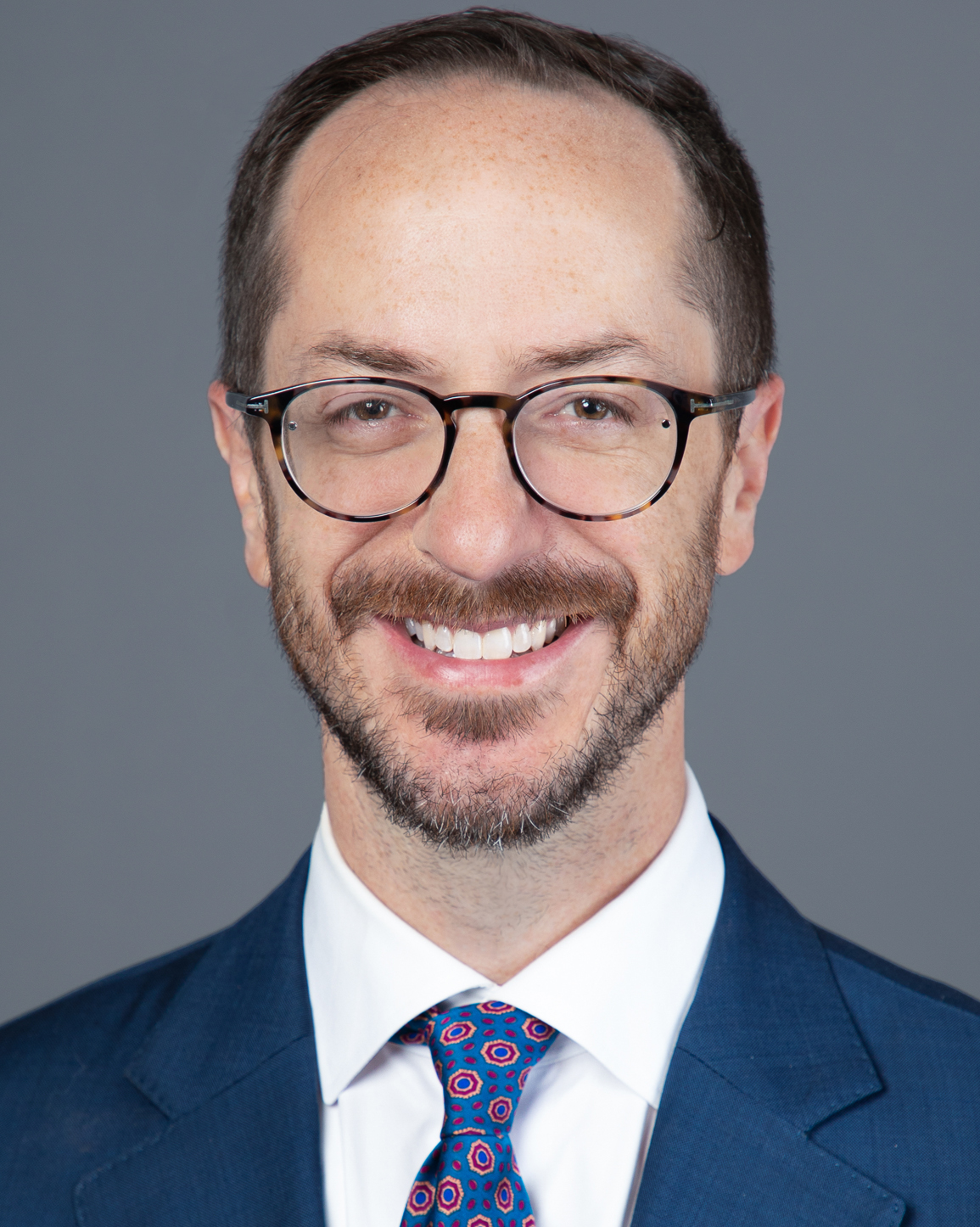

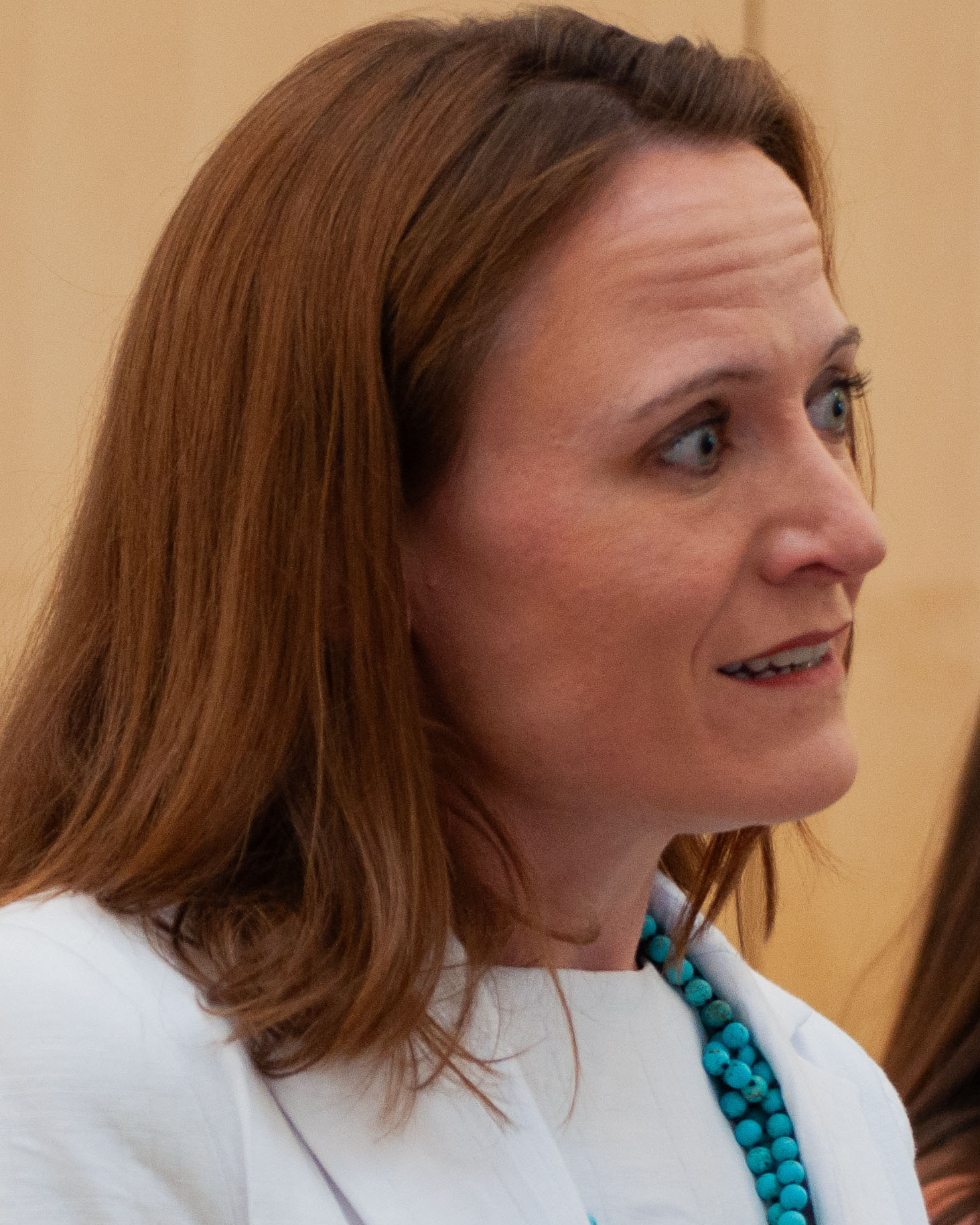

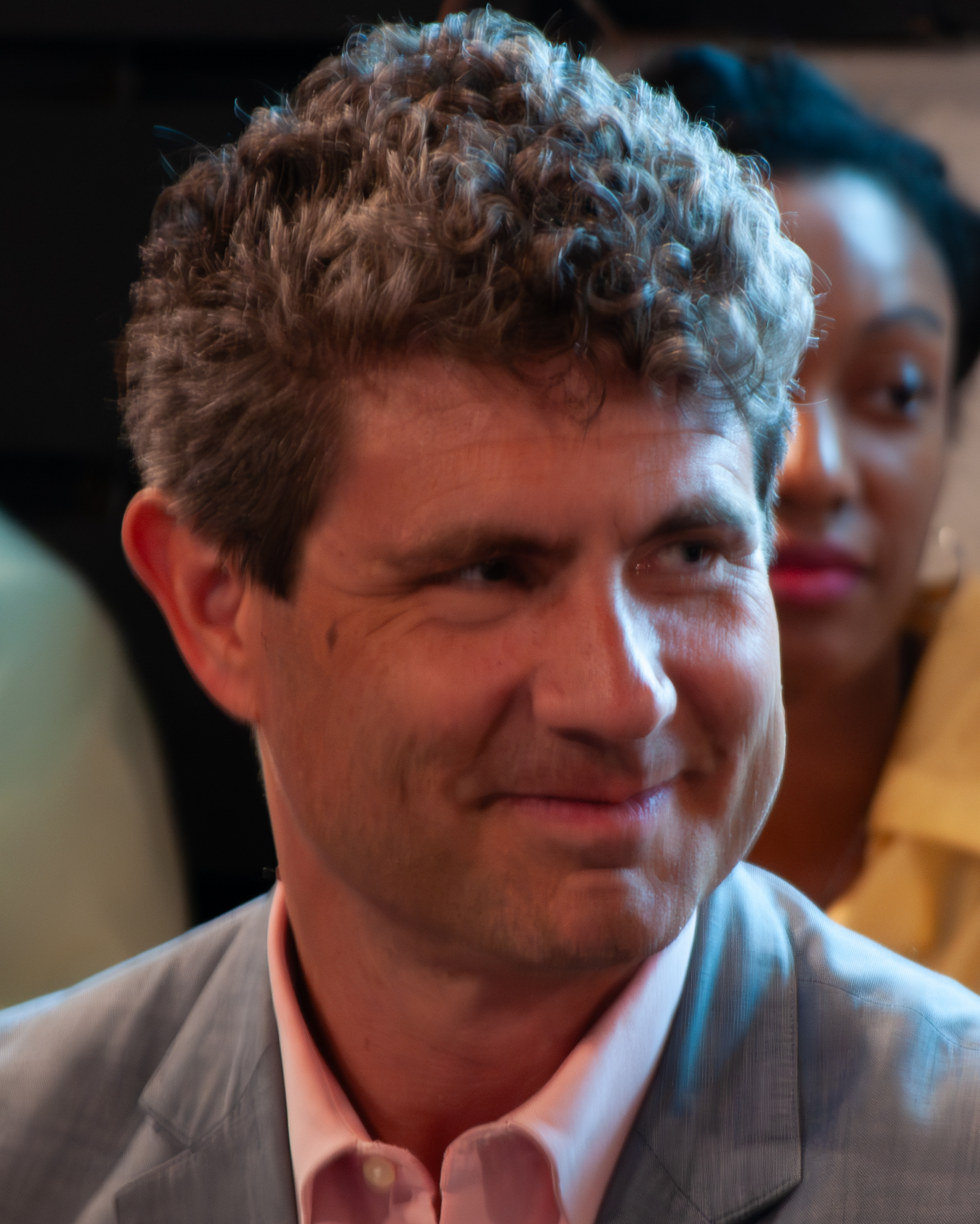

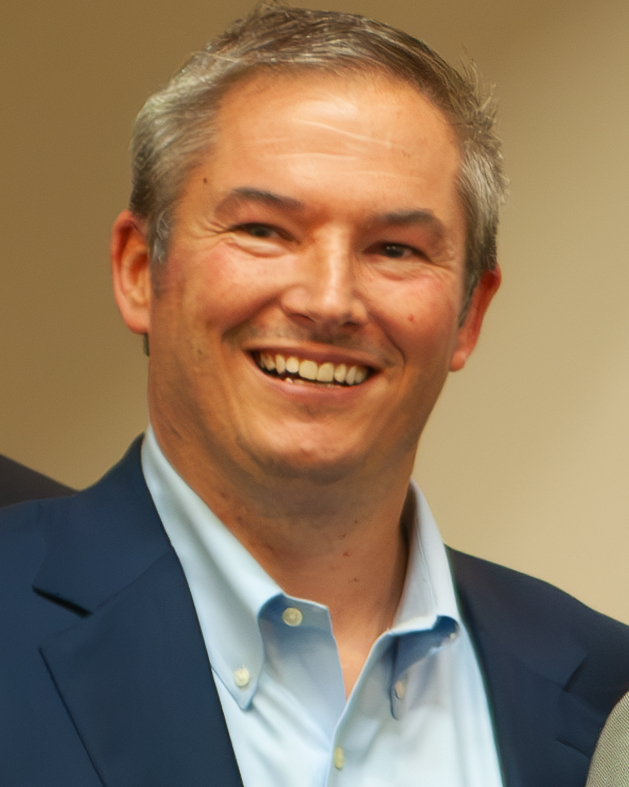

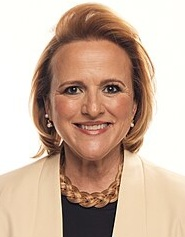

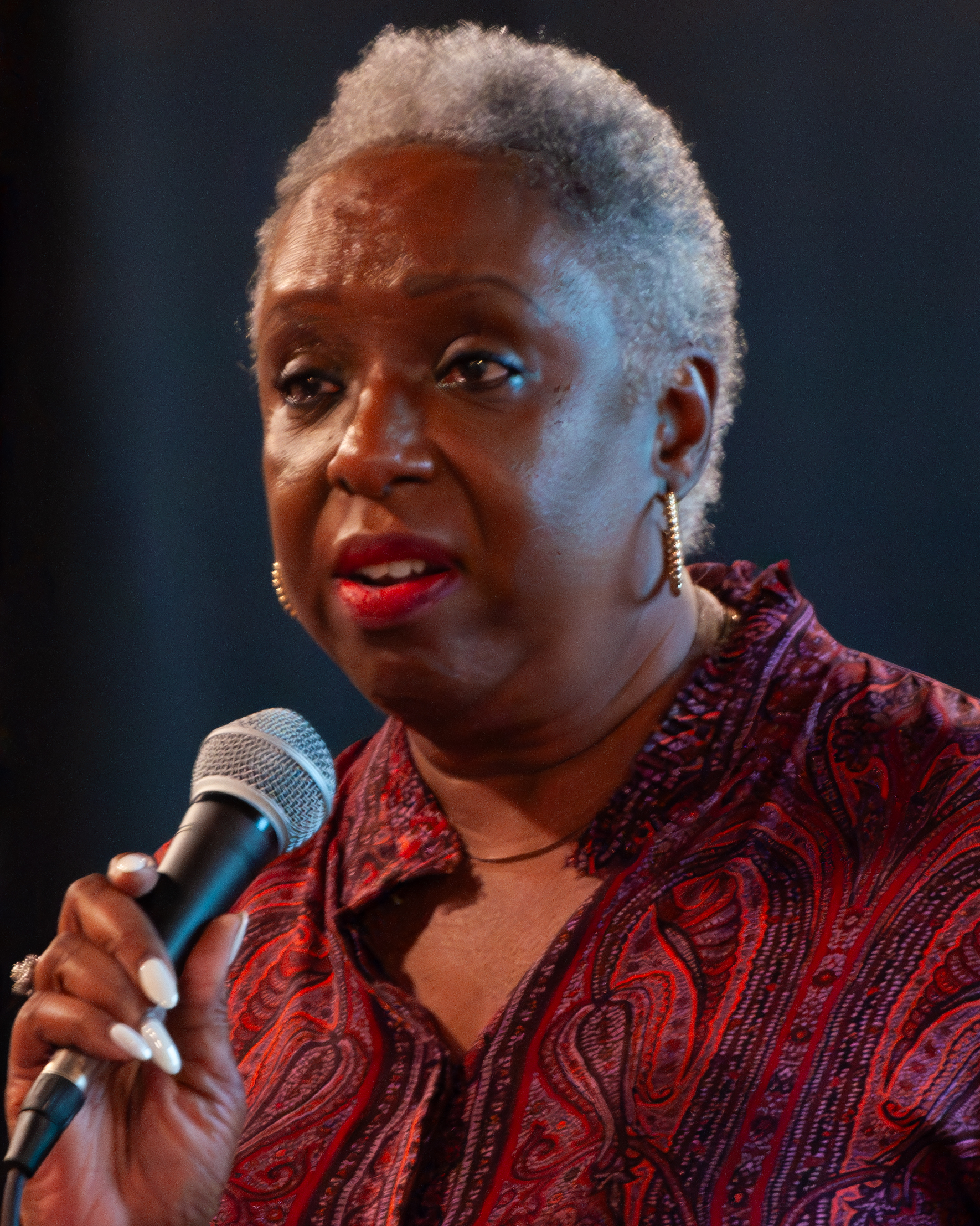
Candidate	Freddie O'Connell	Alice Rolli	Matt Wiltshire
Party	Democratic	Republican	Democratic
First round	27,503; 27.14%	20,472; 20.20%	17,193; 16.97%
Runoff	72,989; 63.85%	41,205; 36.04%	Eliminated
Candidate	Jeff Yarbro	Heidi Campbell	Sharon Hurt
Party	Democratic	Democratic	Democratic
First round	12,356; 12.19%	8,337; 8.23%	6,104; 6.02%
Runoff	Eliminated	Eliminated	Eliminated
- O'Connell: 10–20% 20–30% 30–40% 40–50% 50–60% Rolli: 20–30% 30–40% 40–50% >90% Wiltshire: 10–20% 20–30% 30–40% Hurt: 10–20% 20–30% 30–40% Wilhoite: 10–20% 20–30% Yarbro: 20–30% 60–70% Tie O'Connell: 50–60% 60–70% 70–80% 80–90% >90% Rolli: 50–60% 60–70% 70–80% 80–90% No data
Mayor before election
John Cooper
Democratic
Elected mayor
Freddie O'Connell
Democratic

The 2023 Nashville mayoral election took place on August 3, 2023, to elect the next mayor of Nashville, Tennessee. Incumbent Democratic Mayor John Cooper did not seek re-election to a second term in office. A wide field of candidates ran to succeed Cooper, with Democratic metro councilmember Freddie O'Connell and Republican political consultant Alice Rolli advancing to the runoff because no candidate surpassed 50% of the vote. In the runoff election, O'Connell was elected with 63.9% of the vote, defeating Rolli and becoming the 10th mayor of metro Nashville.

O'Connell was considered one of the more progressive figures in Nashville politics and is known for his vocal opposition to the use of public funds to build the Nissan Stadium. Rolli is a businesswoman who has worked for numerous prominent Tennessee Republicans in the past, including governor Bill Haslam and U.S. Senator Lamar Alexander.

All Nashville municipal elections are required to be non-partisan, but candidates can be affiliated with a political party. Rolli was considered an underdog in the runoff due to her status as a Republican in a heavily Democratic city. In the 60 years since the city of Nashville was consolidated with Davidson County in 1963, all of its mayors have been known to be Democrats. Democrat Joe Biden won the city with 64.5% of the vote in the 2020 presidential election.

== Candidates ==
=== Advanced to runoff ===
Candidate	Experience	Party affiliation	Announced	Ref
Freddie O'Connell	Metro councilmember from the 19th district since 2015	Democratic	April 28, 2022 Website	
Alice Rolli	Former aide to governor Bill Haslam and U.S. Senator Lamar Alexander	Republican	February 24, 2023 Website	

=== Eliminated in first round ===
Candidate	Experience	Party affiliation	Announced	Ref
Natisha Brooks	Educator; Candidate for Tennessee's 5th congressional district in 2022	Republican	February 20, 2023 Website	
Fran Bush	Former member of the Metropolitan Nashville; Public Schools Board (2018–2022)	Independent	February 17, 2023 Website	
Heidi Campbell	State senator from the 20th district since 2021; Nominee for Tennessee's 5th congressional district in 2022	Democratic	April 5, 2023 Website	
Bernie Cox	Business owner Candidate for mayor in 2019	Republican	Website	
Sharon Hurt	At-Large metro councilmember since 2015	Democratic	December 5, 2022 Website	
Stephanie Johnson	Business owner	Independent	May 1, 2023 Website	
Vivian Wilhoite	Davidson County Property Assessor since 2016	Democratic	May 2, 2023 Website	
Matt Wiltshire	Former Nashville Metropolitan Development and Housing Agency chief strategy officer	Democratic	July 13, 2022 Website	
Jeff Yarbro	Former Minority Leader of the Tennessee Senate (2019–2023); State senator from the 21st district since 2015	Democratic	February 17, 2023 Website	

=== Withdrew after the filing deadline ===
Candidate	Experience	Party affiliation	Announced	Withdrew	Ref
Jim Gingrich	Former AllianceBernstein chief operating officer	Democratic	February 8, 2023 Website	July 17, 2023	

=== Withdrew before the filing deadline ===
- Gilbert Ramirez, business owner and former police officer (running for Metro Council at-large)
- Lorenzo Short Jr. real estate broker

=== Disqualified ===
- William Domann, musician
- Zerit Teklay, author

=== Declined ===
- Megan Barry, former mayor (2015–2018) (Party affiliation: Democratic)
- Hal Cato, former nonprofit executive
- John Cooper, incumbent mayor (Party affiliation: Democratic)
- David A. Fox, candidate for mayor in 2015 (endorsed Rolli)
- Bob Freeman, state representative for the 56th district (2018–present) (Party affiliation: Democratic) (endorsed Campbell)
- Odessa Kelly, community activist and nominee for Tennessee's 7th congressional district in 2022 (Party affiliation: Democratic)
- Bob Mendes, metro councilmember (endorsed O'Connell)
- Tara Scarlett, education nonprofit CEO
- Jim Shulman, vice mayor of Nashville (ran for re-election)
- Carol Swain, retired Vanderbilt University professor and candidate for mayor in 2018 and 2019 (Party affiliation: Republican)

== First round ==
=== First round endorsements ===
John Cooper (not running)

Labor unions

- International Association of Fire Fighters Local 140
- Nashville Fraternal Order of Police
Heidi Campbell

State senators

- Sara Kyle, state senator from the 30th district (2015–present)

State representatives

- John Ray Clemmons, state representative from the 55th district (2015–present)
- Bob Freeman, state representative from the 56th district (2019–present)
- Gloria Johnson, state representative from the 90th district (2013–2015, 2019–present)
- Bo Mitchell, state representative from the 50th district (2013–present)

Local officials

- Cheryl Mayes, Metro Nashville School Board member from the 6th district (2022–present)

Organizations

- Planned Parenthood (co-endorsement with O'Connell, Wilhoite, and Yarbro)
- Sunrise Movement Nashville (co-endorsement with O'Connell)

Labor unions

- Ironworkers Local 492

Individuals

- Lucinda Williams, American singer-songwriter
- Kesha, American singer-songwriter
Sharon Hurt

State legislators

- Brenda Gilmore, former state senator from the 19th district (2019–2023)

Local officials

- Erica Gilmore, Davidson County Trustee
- Michael Hancock, outgoing mayor of Denver, Colorado (2011–2023)
- Charlie Tygard, metro councilmember at-large (2007–2015) and for District 35 (2002–2007) (co-endorsement with O'Connell and Wiltshire)
- Brenda Wynn, Davidson County Clerk
Freddie O'Connell

State legislators

- Jason Powell, state representative from the 53rd district (2013–present)

Metro councilmembers

- Erin Evans, District 12 (2019–present)
- Jacob Kleinfelter, District 34 (1995–1999)
- Kristine Lalonde, District 18, (2007–2011)
- Bob Mendes, at-large (2015–present)
- Sean Parker, District 5 (2019–present)
- Dave Rosenberg, District 35 (2015–present)
- Sandra Sepulveda, District 30 (2019–present)
- Charlie Tygard, at-large (2007–2015) and District 35 (2002–2007) (co-endorsement with Hurt and Wiltshire)
- Lynn Williams, District 34 (1999–2007)

Local officials

- Jim Speering, former Metro Nashville School Board member from the 3rd district (2012–2020)

Organizations

- Planned Parenthood (co-endorsement with Campbell, Wilhoite, and Yarbro)
- Sunrise Movement Nashville (co-endorsement with Campbell)
- Tennessee Immigrant and Refugee Rights Coalition

Labor unions

- Amalgamated Transit Union Local 235 (co-endorsement with Wilhoite)
Alice Rolli

Local officials

- David A. Fox, former Metro Nashville School Board chair and candidate for mayor in 2015
- Pearl Sims, former Davidson County planning commission member

Organizations

- Americans for Tax Reform
- Community Leaders of America
- Davidson County GOP

Individuals

- Grover Norquist, political activist and founder of Americans for Tax Reform
- J. C. Bowman, executive and CEO of Professional Educators of Tennessee
- John D. Richardson, Tennessee Republican Party state executive
Vivian Wilhoite

State officials

- Carol Solomon, former Twentieth Circuit Court Division VIII judge (1998–2014)

Local officials

- Glenn Funk, Davidson County District Attorney General (2014–present)
- Nick Leonardo, former Davidson County General Sessions Court Division III judge (2018) and metro councilmember from the 1st district (2016–2018)

Organizations

- Planned Parenthood (co-endorsement with Campbell, O'Connell, and Yarbro)

Labor unions

- Amalgamated Transit Union Local 235 (co-endorsement with O'Connell)
Matt Wiltshire

State legislators

- Jason Potts, former state representative from the 59th district (2019–2023) and metro councilmember from the 30th district (2011–2019)

Metro councilmembers

- George Armistead, at-large (1987–1999)
- Phil Claiborne, District 15 (2007–2015)
- Stewart Clifton, District 18 (1987–1999)
- Jacobia Dowell, District 32 (2011–2019)
- Jamie Isabell, District 2 (2003–2007)
- Sean McGuire, District 25 (2007–2015)
- Robert Nash, District 27 (2019–present)
- Doug Pardue, District 10 (2011–2019)
- Phil Ponder, District 12 (1995–2003)
- Bill Pridemore, District 9 (2011–2019)
- John Rutherford, District 31 (2019–present)
- Carter Todd, District 34 (2007–2015)
- Charlie Tygard, at-large (2007–2015) and District 35 (2002–2007) (co-endorsement with Hurt and O'Connell)
- Nancy VanReece, District 8 (2015–present)
- Chris Whitson, District 23 (2003–2005)

Local officials

- Claudia Bonnyman, Davidson County Chancery Court judge
- Daron Hall, former Davidson County Sheriff (2002–present)

Organizations

- Nashville Fraternal Order of Police
Jeff Yarbro

U.S. Representatives

- Jim Cooper, TN-05 (2003–2023), TN-04 (1983–1995)

State legislators

- Raumesh Akbari, Minority Leader of the Tennessee Senate (2023–present) from the 29th district (2019–present)
- Darren Jernigan, state representative from the 60th district (2013–present) and metro councilmember from the 11th district (2011–2015)

Metro councilmembers

- Larry Hagar, District 11 (2015–present)

Organizations

- Planned Parenthood (co-endorsement with Campbell, O'Connell, and Wilhoite)

Labor unions

- United Food and Commercial Workers Local 1995

=== First round polling ===
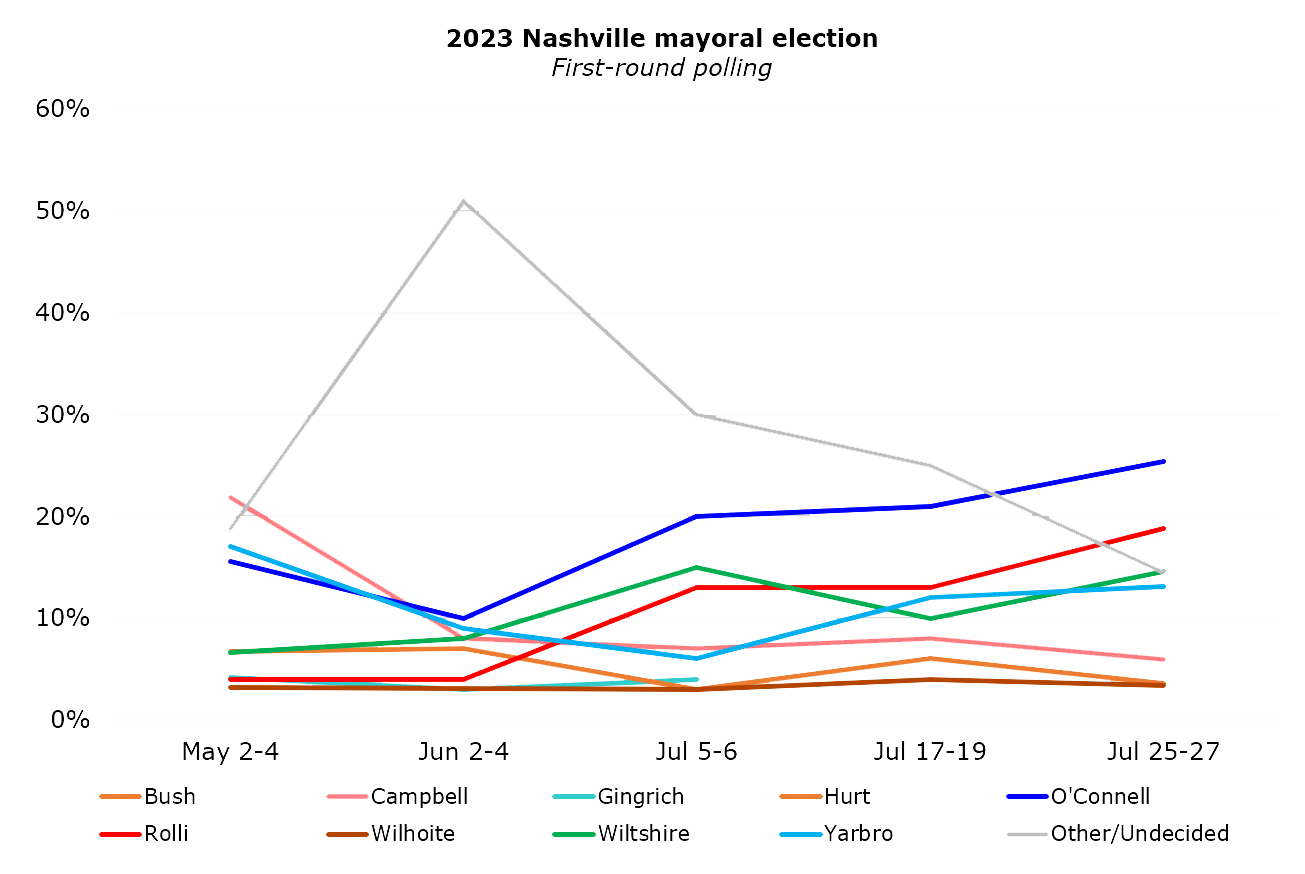
Graph of polling for the first round as of August 2, 2023

Poll source	Date(s) administered	Sample size	Margin of error	Fran Bush	Heidi Campbell	Jim Gingrich	Sharon Hurt	Freddie O'Connell	Alice Rolli	Vivian Wilhoite	Matt Wiltshire	Jeff Yarbro	Other/ Undecided
VictoryPhones (R) (Note: Poll was conducted for Tennesseans for Student Success)	July 25–27, 2023	500 (LV)	± 4.4%	0.8%	5.9%	–	3.6%	25.4%	18.8%	3.4%	14.6%	13.1%	14.5%
GBAO Strategies (D) (Note: Poll was conducted for TN Laborers PAC)	July 17–19, 2023	500 (LV)	± 4.4%	–	8%	–	6%	21%	13%	4%	10%	12%	25%
	July 17	Gingrich withdraws from the race											
Music City Research (Note: Poll was conducted for Harpeth Strategies)	July 5–6, 2023	502 (LV)	± 4.2%	–	7%	4%	3%	20%	13%	3%	15%	6%	30%
Public Policy Polling (D) (Note: Poll was conducted for NAIOP Nashville)	June 2–4, 2023	400 (LV)	± 4.2%	–	8%	3%	7%	10%	4%	–	8%	9%	51% (Note: "Not sure" with 45%; "Someone else" with 6%)
VictoryPhones (R)	May 2–4, 2023	500 (LV)	± 4.4%	2%	21.9%	4.2%	6.7%	15.6%	4%	3.2%	6.6%	17%	18.8%

Hypothetical polling

Poll source	Date(s) administered	Sample size	Margin of error	Hal Cato	John Cooper	Matt Wiltshire	Undecided
Impact Research (Note: This poll was conducted for Hal Cato)	April 6–11, 2022	500 (LV)	± 4.4%	38%	28%	13%	21%

=== First round results ===
2023 Nashville mayoral election results (first round)
Candidate	Votes	%
Freddie O'Connell	27,503	27.14
Alice Rolli	20,472	20.20
Matthew Wiltshire	17,193	16.97
Jeff Yarbro	12,356	12.19
Heidi Campbell	8,337	8.23
Sharon Hurt	6,104	6.02
Vivian Willhoite	4,758	4.70
Jim Gingrich	1,668	1.65
Natisha Brooks	1,458	1.44
Stephanie Johnson	581	0.57
Fran Bush	503	0.50
Bernie Cox	322	0.32
Write-in	80	0.07
Total votes	101,335	100.00

== Runoff ==
=== Runoff endorsements ===
Endorsements in bold were made after the first round.

Freddie O'Connell

State senators

- **Heidi Campbell**, state senator from the 20th district (2021–present) and 2023 mayoral candidate
- **Jeff Yarbro**, state senator from the 21st district (2015–present) and 2023 mayoral candidate

State representatives

- Jason Powell, state representative from the 53rd district (2013–present)

Metro councilmembers

- Erin Evans, District 12 (2019–present)
- Jacob Kleinfelter, District 34 (1995–1999)
- Kristine Lalonde, District 18, (2007–2011)
- Bob Mendes, at-large (2015–present)
- Sean Parker, District 5 (2019–present)
- Dave Rosenberg, District 35 (2015–present)
- Sandra Sepulveda, District 30 (2019–present)
- Charlie Tygard, at-large (2007–2015) and District 35 (2002–2007)
- Lynn Williams, District 34 (1999–2007)

Local officials

- Jim Speering, former Metro Nashville School Board member from the 3rd district (2012–2020)
- **Matt Wiltshire**, Former Nashville Metropolitan Development and Housing Agency chief strategy officer and 2023 mayoral candidate

Individuals

- **Jim Gingrich**, former AllianceBernstein COO and 2023 mayoral candidate

Organizations

- **Equity Alliance**
- **Nashville Business Coalition**
- **Nashville Justice League**
- Planned Parenthood
- Sunrise Movement Nashville
- **Tennessee Democratic Party**
- Tennessee Immigrant and Refugee Rights Coalition

Labor unions

- Amalgamated Transit Union Local 235
- **Central Labor Council of Nashville and Middle Tennessee**
- **International Alliance of Theatrical Stage Employees** Local 46
- **International Association of Fire Fighters** Local 140
Alice Rolli

Local officials

- **Fran Bush**, former member of the Metropolitan Nashville Public Schools Board (2018–2022) and 2023 mayoral candidate
- David A. Fox, former Metro Nashville School Board chair and candidate for mayor in and candidate for mayor in 2015
- Pearl Sims, former Davidson County planning commission member

Organizations

- Americans for Tax Reform
- Community Leaders of America
- Davidson County GOP

Individuals

- Grover Norquist, political activist and founder of Americans for Tax Reform
- J. C. Bowman, executive and CEO of Professional Educators of Tennessee
- John D. Richardson, Tennessee Republican Party state executive

=== Runoff polling ===
Poll source	Date(s) administered	Sample size	Margin of error	Freddie O'Connell	Alice Rolli	Other/ Undecided
Show Me Victories (D)	August 11–16, 2023	430 (RV)	± 3.8%	**58%**	40%	2%

=== Runoff results ===
2023 Nashville mayoral election results (runoff)
Candidate	Votes	%
Freddie O'Connell	**72,989**	**63.85**
Alice Rolli	41,205	36.04
Write-in	123	0.11
Total votes	**114,317**	**100.00**

== See also ==
- 2023 Jackson, Tennessee mayoral election
- 2023 Knoxville, Tennessee mayoral election
- 2023 Memphis, Tennessee mayoral election
