= Tennessee Justice Center =

Public policy advocacy organization and law firm in Tennessee

- Type: Non-profit legal advocacy
- Founded: 1996
- Headquarters: 301 Charlotte Avenue, Nashville, Tennessee 37201
- Website: Tennessee Justice Center

The Tennessee Justice Center (TJC) is a non-profit public policy advocacy organization and law firm based in Nashville, Tennessee. It was established in 1996 to represent approximately 1.3 million Tennessee low-income families by helping shape public policy and through class action lawsuits. In 1996, the United States Congress had ordered that federally funded legal services programs no longer pursue class actions. Since its formation, the Tennessee Justice Center has helped thousands of poor families secure needed health care, assistance, and food aid.

== See also ==
- Legal Services Corporation
- TennCare
