= Mike Turner (Tennessee politician) =

American politician (born 1955)

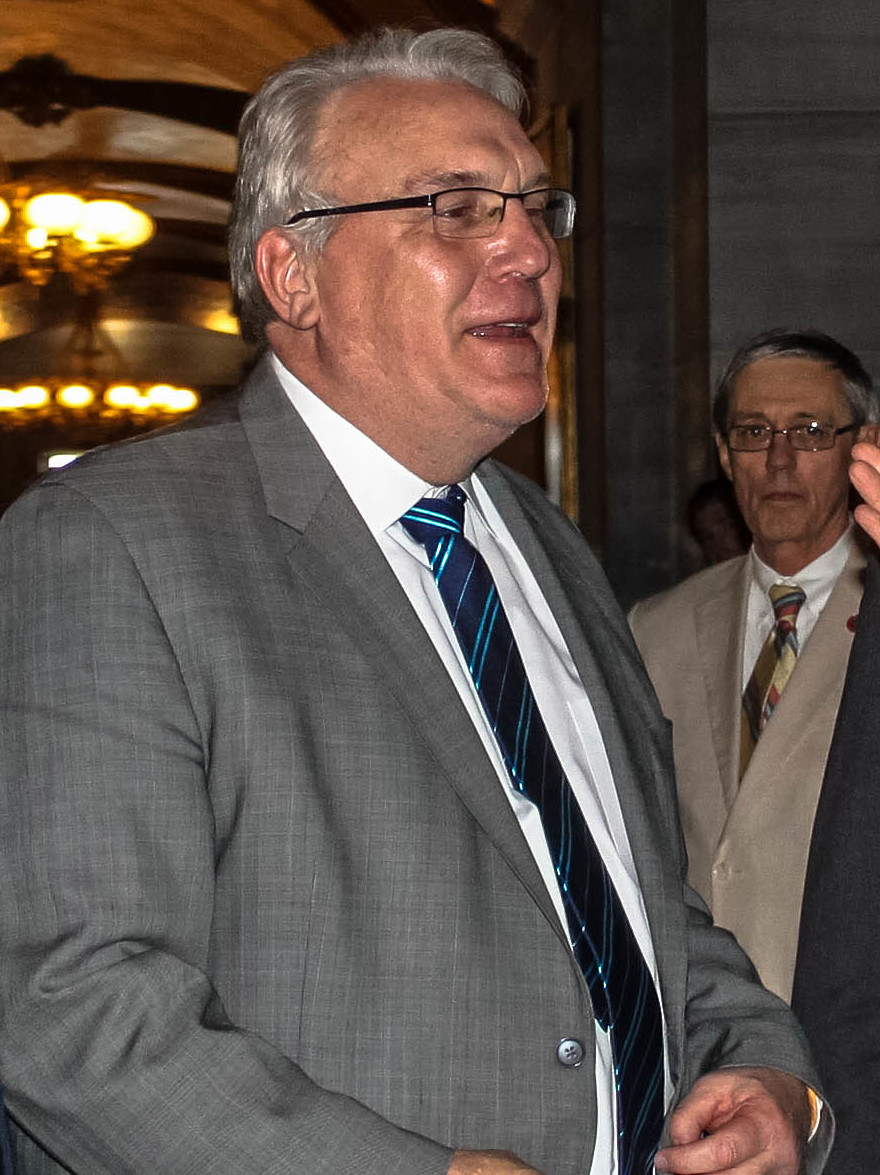
- Turner in 2014

Member of the Tennessee House of Representatives from the 51st district
- In office 1999–2015
- Preceded by: C. Robb Robinson
- Succeeded by: Bill Beck

Personal details
- Born: Mike Turner; February 6, 1955 (age 71)
- Party: Democratic
- Education: Middle Tennessee State University Tennessee State University
- Occupation: Firefighter

Mike Turner (born February 6, 1955) is a Tennessee politician who sat in the Tennessee House of Representatives representing District 51, which is composed of part of Davidson County and includes Old Hickory. He is a member of the Tennessee Democratic Party.

== Early life and education ==
The son of Joyce and Johnny Turner, Mike graduated from Dupont High School and also attended Middle Tennessee State University, Tennessee State University, and the National Fire Academy. Former Representative Turner attends Old Hickory Methodist Church.

== Political career ==
Mike Turner served the people of District 51 in the Tennessee General Assembly from 1999–2014. He served as the Chairman of the House Democratic Caucus. Chairman Turner served on the Education Committee, the State and Local Government Committee, the Health Committee and the Calendar & Rules Committee.

Before being elected in 1999, Representative Turner served as the Political Director for the Tennessee Professional Fire Firefighters serving in Nashville and Washington, D.C. for over 13 years. Former Representative Turner also currently works as a Fire Captain for Company 3 of the Nashville Fire Department.
