= 2015 Nashville mayoral election =

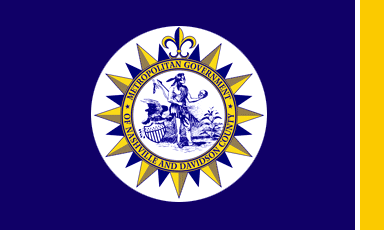
- August 6, 2015 (first round); September 10, 2015 (runoff); Officially nonpartisan
- Turnout: 28.39% ▲ (first round) 8.68 pp 29.63% ▲ (runoff) 1.24 pp
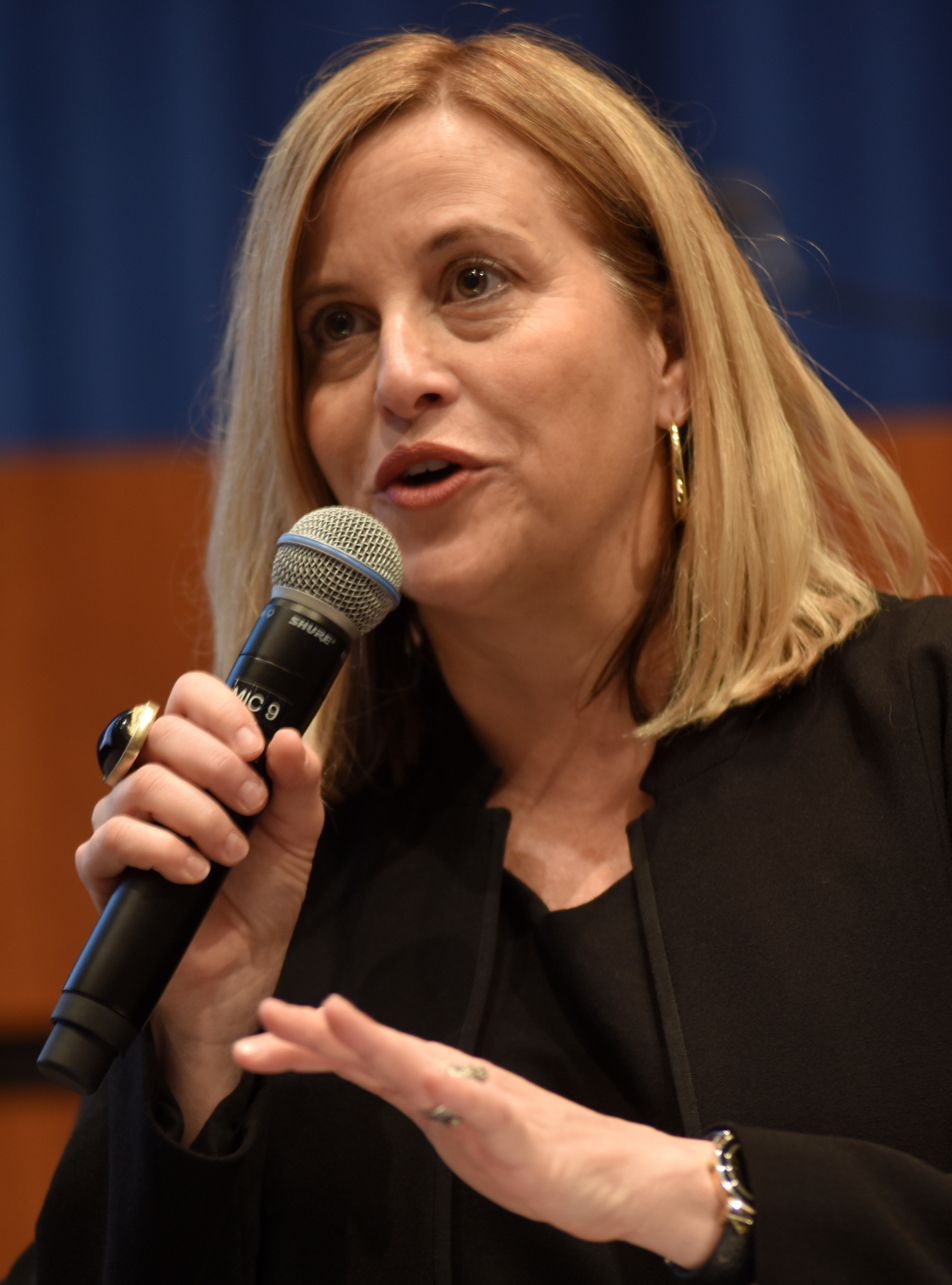

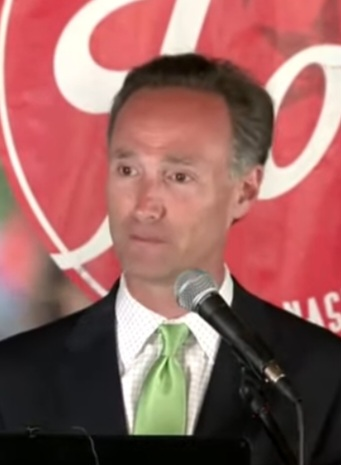

Candidate	Megan Barry	David Fox	Bill Freeman
Party	Democratic	Republican	Democratic
First round	24,553; 23.53%	23,754; 22.77%	22,308; 21.38%
Runoff	60,519; 54.79%	49,694; 44.99%	Eliminated
Candidate	Howard Gentry Jr.	Charles Robert Bone	Linda Eskind Rebrovick
Party	Democratic	Democratic	Republican
First round	12,110; 11.61%	10,962; 10.51%	5,827; 5.59%
Runoff	Eliminated	Eliminated	Eliminated
- Barry: <10% 10–20% 20–30% 30–40% 40–50% 50–60% Fox: <10% 10–20% 20–30% 30–40% 40–50% 50–60% 60–70% 70–80% Freeman: <10% 10–20% 20–30% 30–40% Gentry: <10% 10–20% 20–30% 40–50% 70–80% Bone: <10% No data Barry: 50–60% 60–70% 70–80% 80–90% >90% Fox: 50–60% 60–70% 70–80% 80–90% No data
Mayor before election
Karl Dean
Democratic
Elected mayor
Megan Barry
Democratic

The 2015 Nashville mayoral election took place on August 6, 2015, to elect the next mayor of Nashville, Tennessee. Incumbent Democratic Mayor Karl Dean was term limited and could not run for re-election to a third term in office. Since there was no candidate that received a majority of votes in the initial round of the election, a runoff election was held. In the runoff election, Democratic candidate Megan Barry was elected with 54.8% of the vote, defeating Republican Candidate David Fox.

All Nashville municipal elections are required to be non-partisan, but each candidate was affiliated with a political party.

== Candidates ==
=== Advanced to the runoff ===
- Megan Barry, Metropolitan Councilmember
- David Fox, former chairman of the Metropolitan Nashville Public Schools Board

=== Eliminated in the first round ===
- Bill Freeman, real estate executive, former treasurer of the Tennessee Democratic Party and former director of Development for the Nashville Metropolitan Development and Housing Agency
- Bobby Bones, National Radio Personality
- Charles Robert Bone, attorney and businessman
- Howard Gentry, Davidson County Criminal Court Clerk, former Vice Mayor and candidate for Mayor in 2007
- Jeremy Kane, charter school founder
- Linda Eskind Rebrovick, businesswoman

=== Potential ===
- Stuart Brunson, former Deputy Governor of Tennessee
- Butch Eley, businessman
- Frank Garrison, businessman
- Jason Holleman, Metropolitan Councilmember
- Ronnie Steine, Metropolitan Councilmember and former Vice Mayor
- Carter Todd, Metropolitan Councilmember
- Mike Turner, state representative

=== Declined ===
- Daron Hall, Davidson County Sheriff
- Torry Johnson, Davidson County District Attorney
- Jerry Maynard, Metropolitan Councilmember
- Diane Neighbors, Vice Mayor of Nashville and former Metropolitan Councilmember
- Bill Purcell, former Mayor
- Ralph Schulz, President and CEO of the Nashville Area Chamber of Commerce
- Jeff Yarbro, state senator

== Results ==
=== First round ===
Election Results August 6, 2015
Candidate	Votes	%
Megan Barry	24,553	23.53%
David A. Fox	23,754	22.77%
Bill Freeman	22,308	21.38%
Howard Gentry Jr.	12,110	11.61%
Charles Robert Bone	10,962	10.51%
Linda Eskind Rebrovick	5,827	5.59%
Jeremy Kane	4,767	4.57%
Write-in	62	0.06%
Total votes	104,343	100.00%

=== Runoff ===
No candidates received the required majority for the election. Therefore, a runoff election took place on September 10, 2015, between the two candidates receiving the most votes, Megan Barry and David Fox.

Democrat Megan Barry defeated Republican David Fox by a 9.8% margin.

2015 Nashville mayoral election results (runoff)
Candidate	Votes	%
Megan Barry	60,519	54.79
David A. Fox	49,694	44.99
Write-in	241	0.22
Total votes	110,454	100.00

== See also ==
- 2015 Knoxville mayoral election
- 2015 Memphis mayoral election
