= WeGo Public Transit =

Public transportation in Nashville, Tennessee

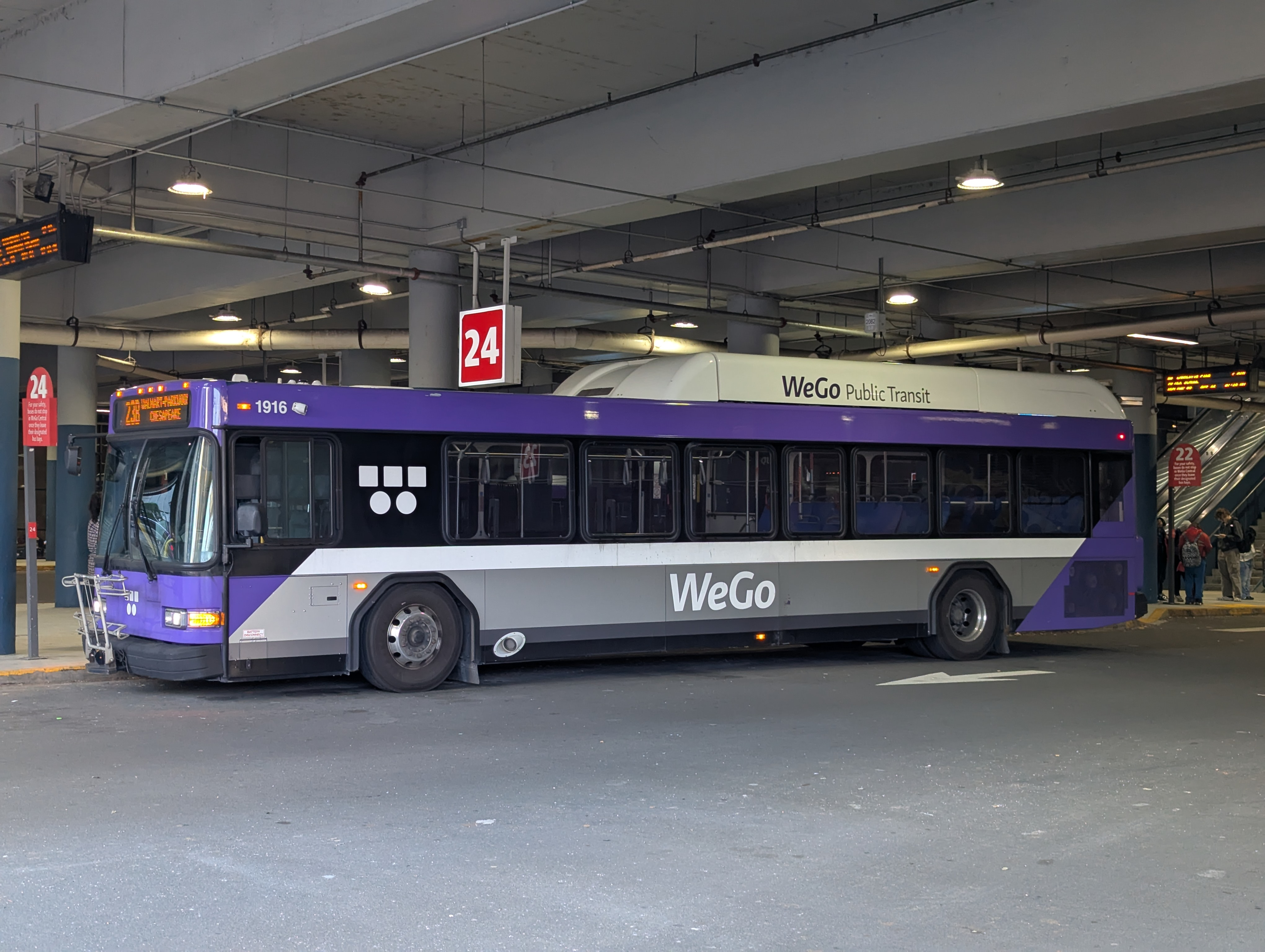
- A WeGo Gillig Low Floor at the Elizabeth Duff Transit Center in Nashville
- Founded: 1973
- Headquarters: 430 Myatt Drive
- Service area: Davidson County, Tennessee
- Service type: Bus; Paratransit; Park and ride
- Routes: 36
- Hubs: Elizabeth Duff Transit Center
- Fleet: 235-238 (bus), 120-125 (AccessRide)
- Daily ridership: 33,600 (weekdays, Q2 2026)
- Annual ridership: 9,319,000 (2025)
- Fuel type: Diesel; Diesel-electric; Electric
- Operator: Davidson Transit Organization
- Chief executive: Stephen G. Bland
- Website: wegotransit.com

WeGo Public Transit is a public transportation agency based in Nashville, Tennessee. Consisting of buses, commuter rail, and paratransit, the system serves Nashville and Davidson County. In 2025, the system had a ridership of about 33,600 per weekday as of the second quarter of 2026. For 2023, WeGo expected to collect $5.2 million in fare revenue and spend $99.3 million in operation. To make up most of the difference, WeGo expected to collect subsidies from the city, state, and national governments.

WeGo maintains camera systems aboard its buses for "onboard surveillance" and partnered with the Metro Arts Commission, which commissioned six artist-designed transit shelters are placed along the new 28th/31st Avenue Bridge.

== History ==
The first public transportation in Nashville began in 1860 when the McGavock and Mt. Vernon Horse Railroad Company and the South Nashville Street Railroad Company were joined to create a public transportation system using steam and mules to power rail cars. The first electric streetcar in Nashville came in 1889. Over the years, several different companies offered transit in Nashville. The first buses came in 1926, as a complement to the preceding rail lines. In 1930, Tennessee Electric Power Company took over the transit system and phased out streetcars by February 1941. In 1953, the company was reorganized and changed its name to Nashville Transit Company. The next 20 years saw the decline of public transportation in Nashville and the rise of the automobile. This led to higher fares and service cutbacks for the transit system. In order to keep public transportation in the city viable, Metro-Nashville government purchased the Nashville Transit Company and created the Metropolitan Transit Authority in 1973.

=== BRT Lite expansion projects ===
On September 27, 2009, the MTA implemented the first phase of its new bus rapid transit (BRT) light service on the Gallatin Road corridor, designated route 56 Gallatin Road BRT Lite. Covering 12 miles (19 km), this BRT service began operating from Music City Central to the edge of Sumner County just north of Rivergate Mall. The route has fewer stops and more frequently using new articulated buses with hybrid engines. During the second phase of BRT in spring 2010, more customer amenities and bus priority signals were added.

Due to a major flood in May 2010, the MTA suffered losses to their fleet and their maintenance/administration offices. The total losses amounted to 39 buses and 39 paratransit vans, various other support vehicles and severe damage caused to both their offices and Riverfront station on the Music City Star. The MTA had borrowed buses and other vehicles from surrounding transit agencies, including Memphis and Cincinnati to help restore transit service.

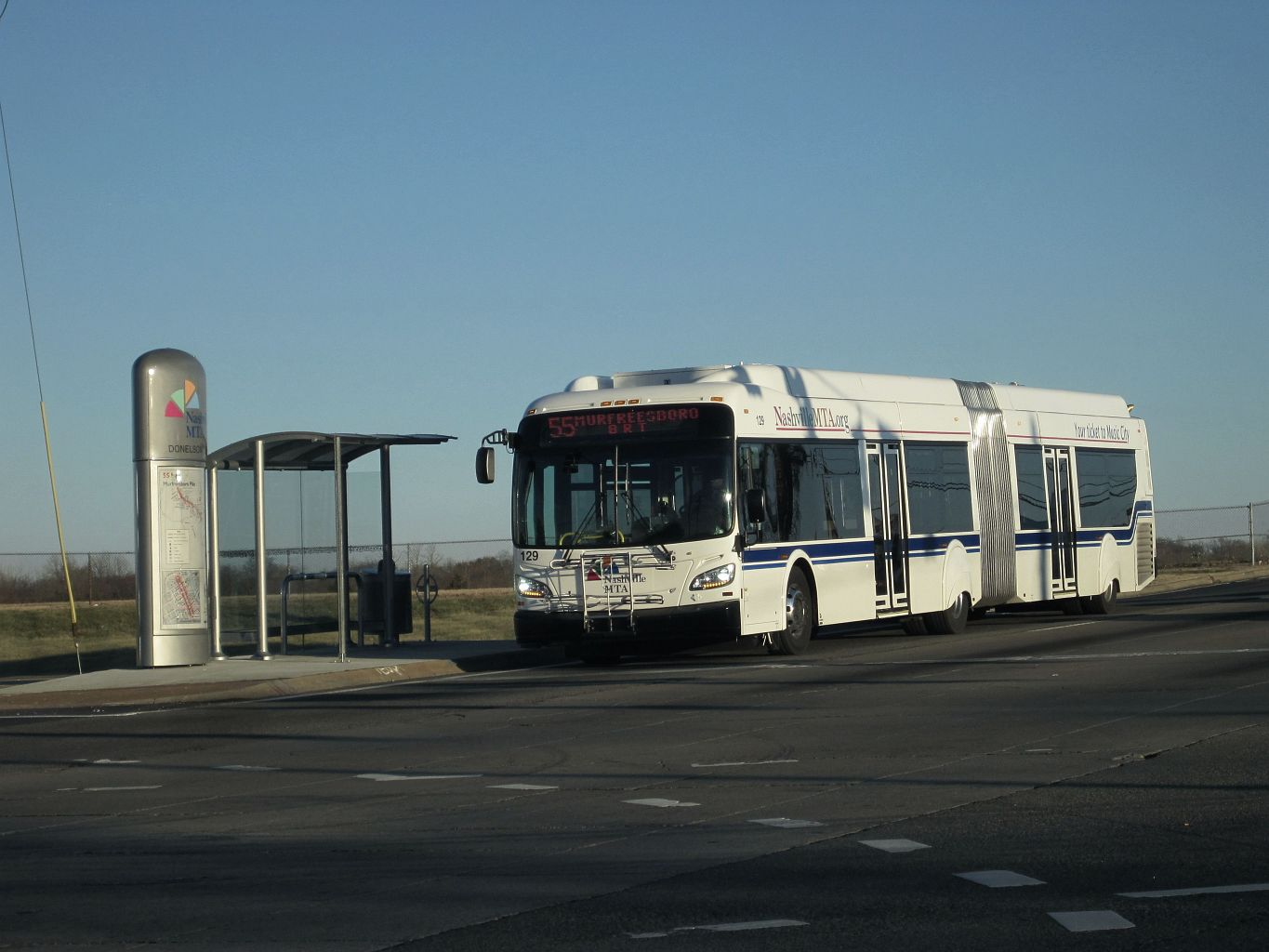
MTA articulated bus on Murfreesboro Pike in 2013.

Murfreesboro Pike was identified as the second corridor for BRT Lite implementation, with service beginning on April 1, 2013. The Murfreesboro Pike BRT Lite stretches from downtown to the Antioch area near the Global Mall at the Crossings.

Originally, Mayor Karl Dean had his eyes set on a full-fledged BRT route taking passengers from West End Avenue down Broadway, across the river to East Nashville's Five Points district with dedicated bus lanes instead of mixed traffic like the BRT Lite. On January 22, 2015, the MTA announced that it would "cease work on the Amp," to focus on planning for other projects.

Charlotte Pike became the third major corridor in Nashville to have BRT Lite service on March 30, 2015, with buses traveling between downtown and the Charlotte Walmart located off River Road. In March 2015, preliminary planning also started for a BRT Lite route on Nolensville Pike. Route 52, which began service on March 27, 2016, operates on Nolensville Pike and offers more frequent service and fewer stops. While the other previous BRT Lite corridors (Gallatin Pike, Murfreesboro Pike, and Charlotte Pike) all feature both a local service to supplement their respective BRT lite lines, the Nolensville Pike corridor only features route 52 which replaced route 12.

In October 2017, Mayor Megan Barry unveiled her $5.2 billion plans for expanding Nashville's transportation infrastructure including the addition of light rail service. The final mass transit system plan named "Let's Move Nashville", included 26 miles (42 km) of light rail and 25 miles (40 km) of bus rapid transit, was later rejected 64% to 36% in a local referendum in May 2018.

=== Rebranding and recent history ===
On July 12, 2018, the MTA announced that it was re-branding itself as WeGo Public Transit to reflect the changing landscape of public transit in the region and to also coincide with various recommendations from the 2016 nMotion plan. Despite the failure of the 2018 transit referendum, plans to re-brand the agency were already in place prior to the referendum being held, and the decision to re-brand was made independently of the referendum effort and its outcome.

== Bus service ==
WeGo's bus system serves all of Nashville and Davidson County with 27 local routes and nine regional routes. While no bus service is directly provided to the autonomous Davidson County incorporated community of Forest Hills, some service is provided, though, to Belle Meade, Berry Hill, Goodlettsville and Oak Hill.

Service to the autonomous Davidson County incorporated community of Lakewood began on Monday, April 30, 2012. Route 27 Old Hickory once provided weekday service in Old Hickory via Lakewood. Buses traveled to and from downtown Nashville and Madison. Park-n-rides once existed at the former City Hall in Lakewood and the WeGo Administrative Offices on Myatt Drive in Madison.

=== Frequent lines ===
WeGo, as of November 2023, offers 8 frequent bus lines. The service operates every 15 minutes or less on major corridors throughout Davidson County.

- 3 West End
- 7 Hillsboro
- 22 Bordeaux
- 23 Dickerson Pike
- 50 Charlotte Pike
- 52 Nolensville Pike
- 55 Murfreesboro Pike
- 56 Gallatin Pike

=== Access ===
WeGo offers a paratransit service operating specialized van services for people with disabilities unable to use regular bus routes. WeGo Access provides door-to-door paratransit service in Davidson County within 1.5 miles (2.4 km) from a regular bus route. This service also provides elderly people with a way to get to doctors' appointments and pick up medication. The fare price for this service is $3.70 per ride.

=== Elizabeth Duff Transit Center ===
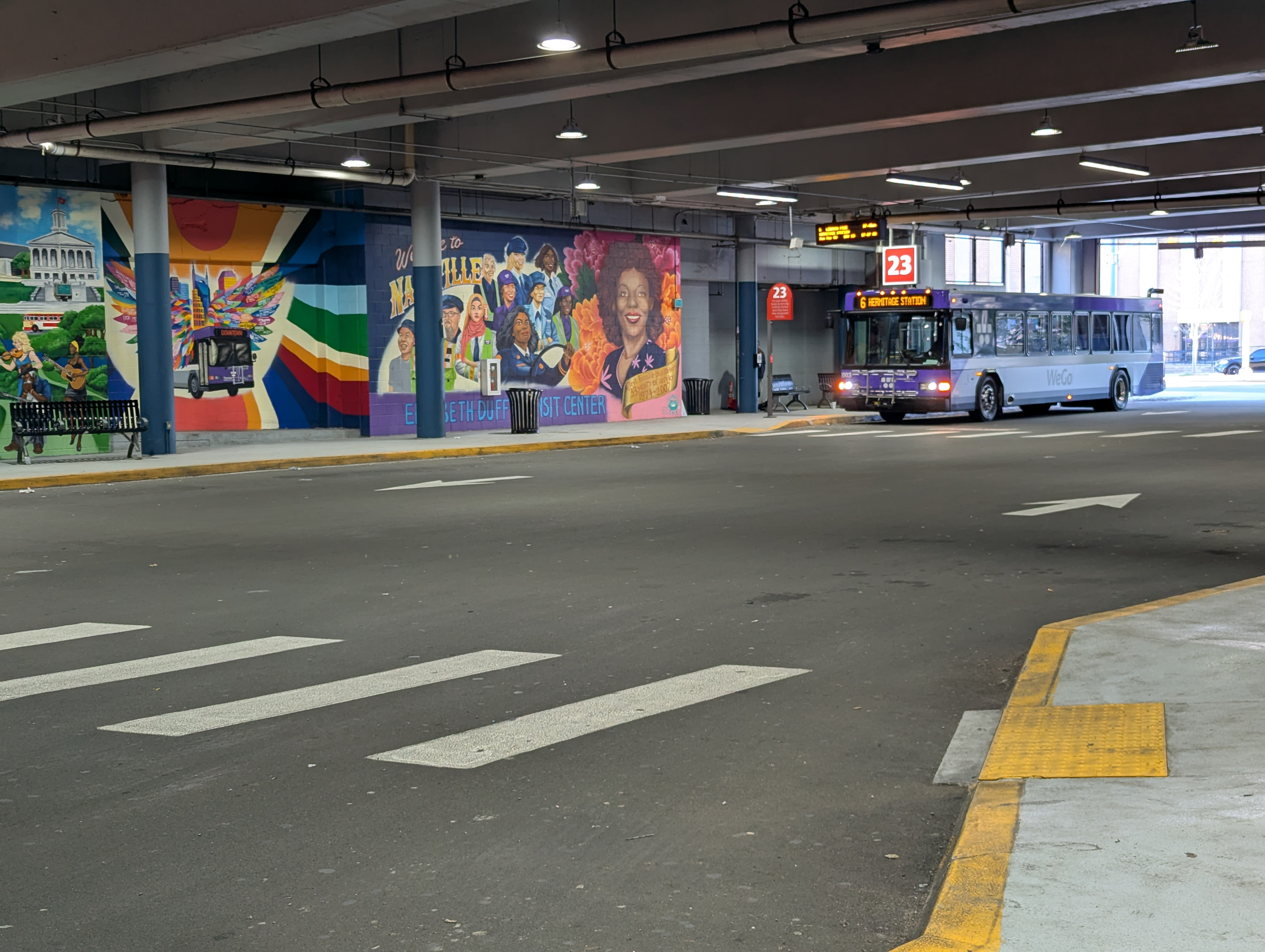
WeGo bus next to mural honoring Elizabeth Duff, on the lower level of the eponymous transit center.

In May 2007, the MTA began construction of Music City Central for $54 million, a downtown bus transfer station and hub next to the Nashville Municipal Auditorium. It replaced the outdoor Downtown Transit Mall on Deaderick Street. The facility opened to the public on Oct. 26, 2008. Many major lines operate as spokes meeting at this hub.

The transfer hub was renamed to WeGo Central along with the rebranding of the service in 2018. In 2023, it was renamed to the Elizabeth Duff Transit Center at WeGo Central, in honor of the first woman and the first African American woman to drive buses for Nashville MTA. A mural was painted at the transit center by Creative Girls Rock, featuring Duff's portrait, and unveiled in September 2024.

Elizabeth Duff Transit Center is a two-story facility with climate-controlled waiting areas. Each level has a U-shaped driveway with twelve bus bays, arranged with six lining each of the straight lengths of the driveways; the upper level opens onto Representative John Lewis Way, while the lower level opens onto 4th Avenue. Riders can buy tickets, check bus schedules, and shop at a convenience store (lower level) or donut shop (upper level), both located at the facility. A multi-story public parking garage is located above the transfer portion of the facility.

=== Neighborhood transit centers ===
WeGo Transit owns two additional neighborhood transit centers. Hillsboro Transit Center, located next to Hillsboro High School, opened in 2022 and serves two bus routes. Dr. Ernest Rip Patton, Jr. North Nashville Transit Center opened in 2024 and serves seven routes.

=== Active bus fleet ===
Manufacturer and Model	Image	Length	Year	Fleet numbers	Engines
New Flyer XDE60		60'	2013	120-141	Cummins ISL9
New Flyer XDE60		60'	2017	1760-1763	Cummins L9
Nabi 60-BRT HEV		60'	2008	180-185	Cummins ISL
Gillig Low Floor		40'	2011	700-724	Cummins ISL9
Gillig Low Floor		40'	2020	2001-2019	Cummins L9
Gillig Low Floor		40'	2023	2300-2319	Cummins L9
Gillig Low Floor		40'	2024	2400-2427	Cummins L9
Gillig Low Floor		40'	2025	2500-2510	Cummins L9
Gillig Low Floor HEV		40'	2012	725-736	Cummins ISL9
Gillig Low Floor HEV		40'	2017	1700-1703	Cummins L9
Gillig Low Floor HEV		40'	2018	1800-1830	Cummins L9
Gillig Low Floor HEV		40'	2019	1900-1920	Cummins L9
Gillig BRT HEV		40'	2015	737-740	Cummins ISL9
MCI D4500CT		45'	2019	2713-2723	Cummins X12
MCI D4500CT		45'	2022	2140-2149	Cummins X12
New Flyer XD60		60'	2021	2164-2168	Cummins L9
New Flyer XD60		60'	2023	2200-2213	Cummins L9
New Flyer XD60		60'	2026	2600-2624	Cummins L9

=== Fares ===
Local service fares are $2.00 for adults; $1.00 for youth aged 19 and under, seniors, people with disabilities, and Medicare card holders with a Discount ID. Daily and monthly fares are capped when using a fare card or contactless payment. Commuter buses cost $4.25. WeGo Transit finished implementing its QuickTicket fare card system in January 2022. Paper tickets were phased out in September 2023.

== WeGo Star ==
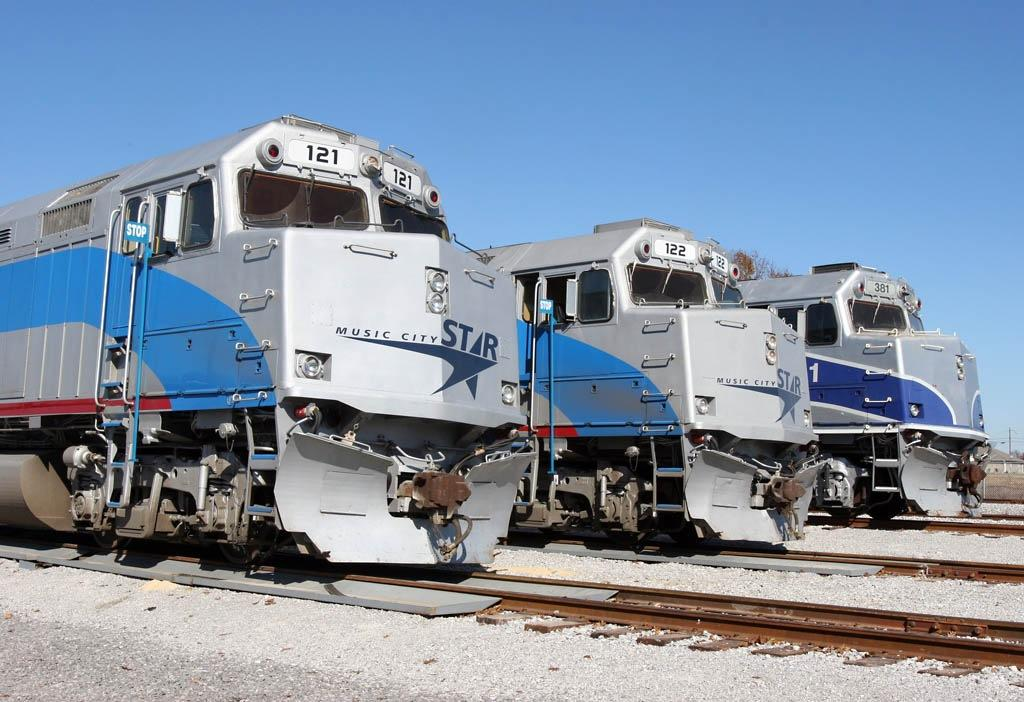
Three EMD F40PH locomotives in use by the WeGo Star lined up within the Lebanon, Tennessee yards in 2006. All three locomotives have since been repainted into the WeGo scheme.

The WeGo Star (reporting mark NRTX) is a commuter rail service running between Nashville and Lebanon, Tennessee. The service uses the existing track of the Nashville and Eastern Railroad. The line stops at seven stations: Riverfront, Donelson, Hermitage, Mt. Juliet, Martha, Hamilton Springs and Lebanon. The operation covers 32 miles (51 km) of rail line. The MTA took over operation of the commuter service in 2008 after initial service began on September 18, 2006. In 2025, the system had an annual ridership of 153,900.

In 2016, a proposed expansion of the system to Clarksville and Ashland City was unveiled. The project is estimated to cost $525 million.

== Expansion ==
WeGo and the RTA are conducting a strategic planning process called nMotion to find new and innovative ways to improve transportation in Nashville. nMotion is WeGo and the RTA's Strategic Plan, a 25-year comprehensive plan designed to meet the Nashville area's vision for transit. The plan will look at how the transit system works today and identify opportunities to enhance the transit system, improve service, attract and retain new riders and meet the growing needs of the Nashville region. Throughout the project, the public will engage in developing the blueprint of actions to make the best opportunities a reality.

In March 2016, WeGo and the RTA began asking for input on three future scenarios for the region's transit system at community meetings.

== See also ==
- List of bus transit systems in the United States
