= Marthe =

Marthe may refer to:

- Marthe (given name) a feminine given name
- Marthe (novel), an 1876 novel by Joris-Karl Huysmans
- Marthe, an 1877 play by Georges Ohnet
- Marthe (film), a 1997 film by Gérard Jugnot

== People with the surname ==
- William Marthé (1894–?), Swiss long-distance runner

== See also ==
- Sainte-Marthe (disambiguation)
- Martha (disambiguation)
- Marta (disambiguation)
- Marte (disambiguation)
- Marth (disambiguation)
