= Hermitage station =

Hermitage

General information
- Location: 4121 Andrew Jackson Parkway; Hermitage, Tennessee
- Coordinates: 36.18996°N 86.60587°W
- Line: Nashville and Eastern Railroad
- Platforms: 1
- Tracks: 1 side platform

Construction
- Parking: 280 spaces
- Accessible: yes

History
- Opened: September 18, 2006 (Music City Star)
- Closed: 1955 (Tennessee Central)

Services
| Preceding station | WeGo Star | Following station |
|---|---|---|
| Donelson toward Riverfront | East Corridor line | Mt. Juliet toward Lebanon |
Former services
| Preceding station | Tennessee Central Railway | Following station |
|---|---|---|
| Stone River toward Nashville | Eastern Division | Tulip Grove toward Harriman |
Location

Hermitage station is a train station in Nashville, Tennessee, serving the WeGo Star regional rail line. It serves Nashville's Hermitage area. Service began September 18, 2006.
