= Martha station =

Rail station in Martha, Tennessee

Coordinates: 36°13′48.46″N 86°25′31.15″W

Martha
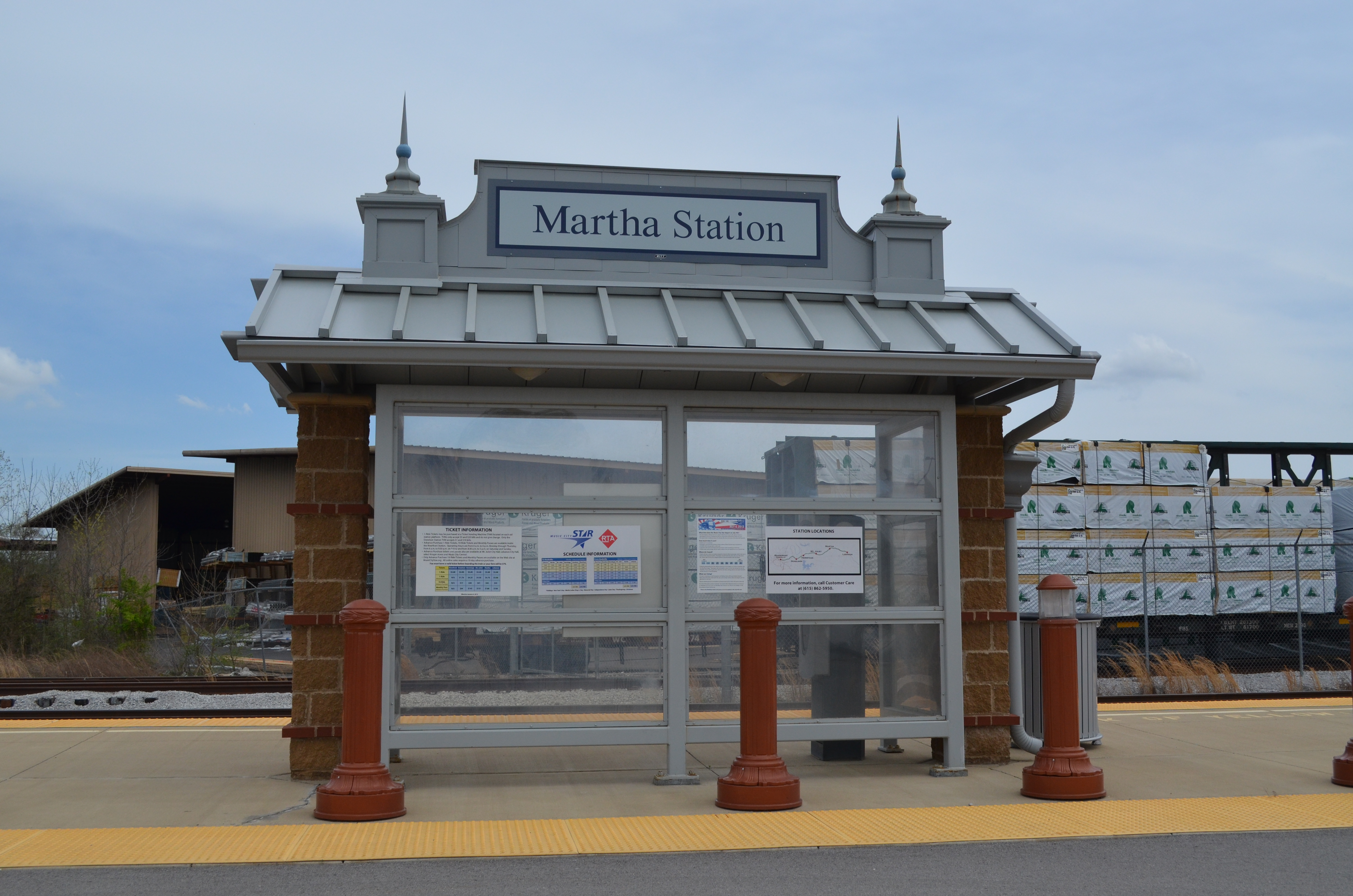

General information
- Location: 65 Martha Circle; Martha, Tennessee
- Line: Nashville and Eastern Railroad
- Platforms: 1 side platform
- Tracks: 2

Construction
- Parking: 75 spaces
- Accessible: yes

History
- Opened: September 18, 2006 (Music City Star)
- Closed: 1955 (Tennessee Central)

Services
Preceding station	WeGo Star	Following station
Mt. Juliet toward Riverfront	East Corridor line	Hamilton Springs toward Lebanon
Former services
Preceding station	Tennessee Central Railway	Following station
Beckwith toward Nashville	Eastern Division	Horn Springs toward Harriman
Location

Martha station is a train station in Martha, Tennessee, serving Nashville's commuter rail line, the WeGo Star. Service began September 18, 2006.
