= Hamilton Springs station =

Hamilton Springs
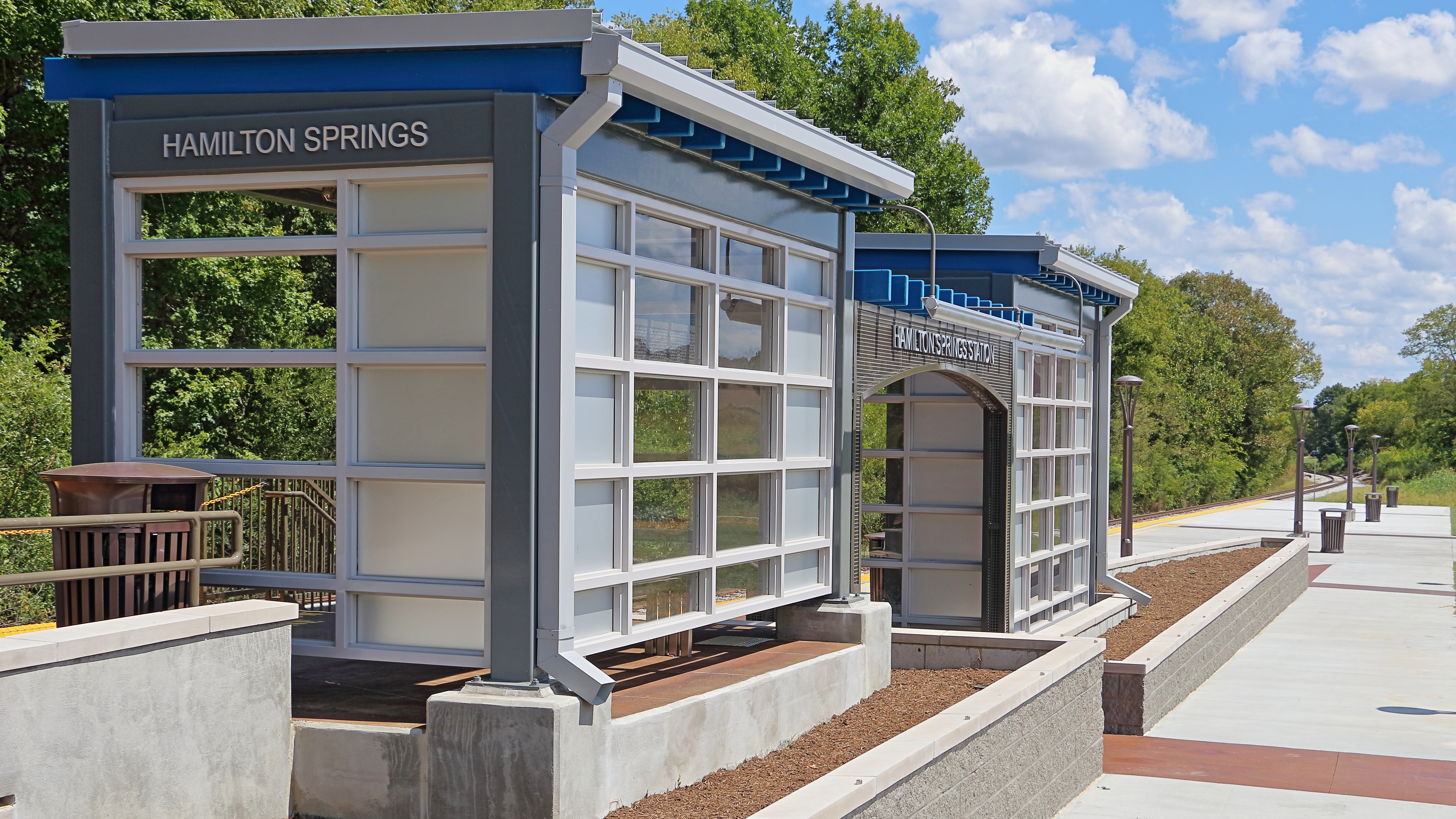
- Hamilton Springs station as viewed looking east

General information
- Location: 2801 State Route 24; Lebanon, Tennessee
- Coordinates: 36°14′04″N 86°22′04″W
- Owner: Tennessee Department of Transportation
- Operator: WeGo Public Transit
- Line: Nashville and Eastern Railroad
- Platforms: 1 side platform
- Tracks: 1

Construction
- Structure type: At-grade
- Parking: 163 spaces

History
- Opened: August 27, 2018
- Closed: 1955 (Tennessee Central)
- Former names: Horn Springs (–1955)

Services
Preceding station	WeGo Star	Following station
Martha toward Riverfront	East Corridor line	Lebanon Terminus
Former services
Preceding station	Tennessee Central Railway	Following station
Martha toward Nashville	Eastern Division	Egan toward Harriman
Location

Hamilton Springs station is a train station in Lebanon, Tennessee, serving Nashville's commuter rail service, the WeGo Star. It is a transit-oriented development (TOD) infill station and was completed in 2018, with service beginning on August 27 of that year.
