= Mt. Juliet station =

Train station in Mount Juliet, Tennessee

Mt. Juliet
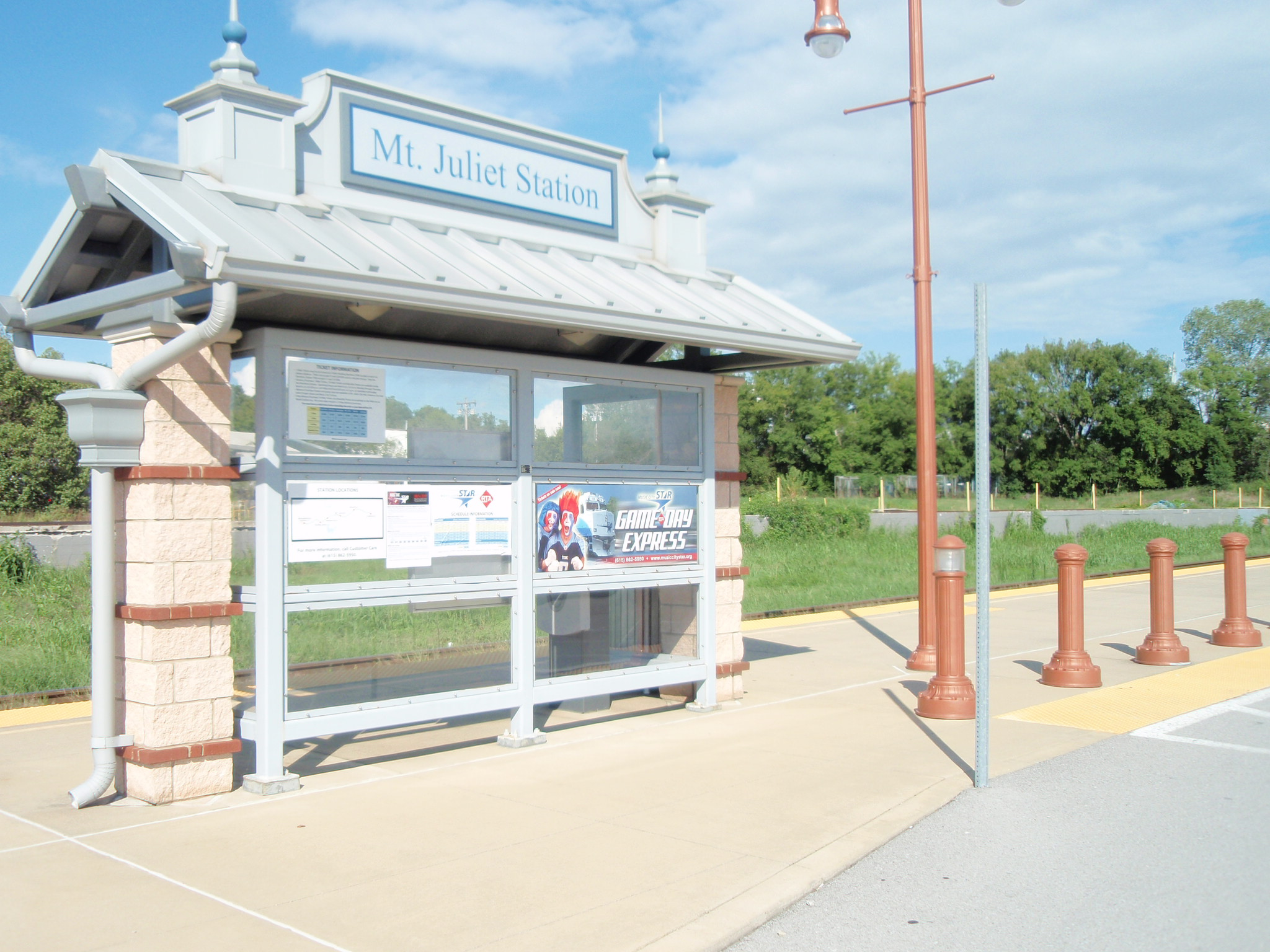

General information
- Location: 22 East Division Street; Mount Juliet, Tennessee
- Coordinates: 36.1994°N 86.517°W
- Line: Nashville and Eastern Railroad
- Platforms: 1 side platform
- Tracks: 1

Construction
- Parking: 220 spaces
- Accessible: yes

History
- Opened: September 18, 2006 (Music City Star)
- Closed: 1955 (Tennessee Central)

Services
Preceding station	WeGo Star	Following station
Hermitage toward Riverfront	East Corridor line	Martha toward Lebanon
Former services
Preceding station	Tennessee Central Railway	Following station
Green Hill toward Nashville	Eastern Division	Beckwith toward Harriman
Location

Mt. Juliet station is a train station in Mount Juliet, Tennessee, serving Nashville's commuter rail service, the WeGo Star. Service began September 18, 2006.
