= Donelson station =

Donelson

General information
- Location: 4706 Lebanon Pike; Nashville, Tennessee
- Coordinates: 36.16704°N 86.66655°W
- Line: Nashville and Eastern Railroad
- Platforms: 1
- Tracks: 1 side platform

Construction
- Parking: 230 spaces
- Accessible: yes

History
- Opened: September 18, 2006 (Music City Star)
- Closed: 1955 (Tennessee Central)

Services
Preceding station	WeGo Star	Following station
Riverfront Terminus	East Corridor line	Hermitage toward Lebanon
Former services
Preceding station	Tennessee Central Railway	Following station
Shops toward Nashville	Eastern Division	Stone River toward Harriman
Location

Donelson station is a train station in Nashville, Tennessee, serving the WeGo Star commuter rail service. It serves the neighborhood of Donelson. Service began September 18, 2006.

The station is the site of the Hip Donelson Farmers Market on Fridays from May through October.
