= Donelson, Nashville =

Neighborhood in Nashville, Tennessee

Donelson
- Neighborhood
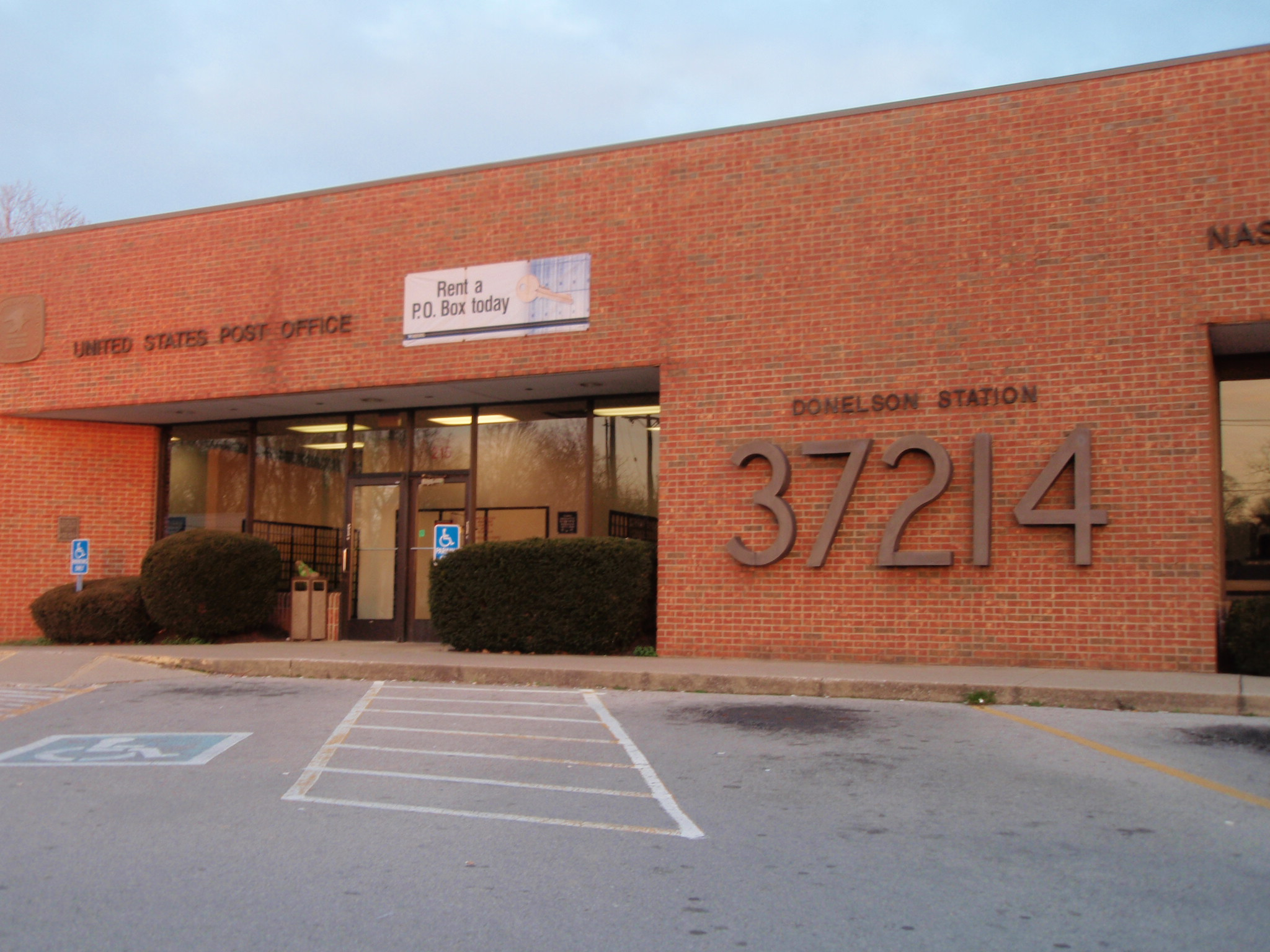
- Donelson, Tennessee Post office

- Location within Tennessee Location within the United States
- Coordinates: 36°09′45″N 86°40′12″W
- Country: United States
- State: Tennessee
- County: Davidson
- City: Nashville
- Time zone: UTC-6 (Central (CST))
  - Summer (DST): UTC-5 (CDT)
- Zip codes: 37076, 37214, 37229
- Area codes: 615, 629

Donelson is a neighborhood of Nashville, Tennessee, about six miles (10 km) east of downtown Nashville along U.S. Route 70. It is named in honor of John Donelson, co-founder of Nashville and father-in-law of Andrew Jackson, Nashvillian and seventh President of the United States. Donelson is governed by the Metropolitan Council of Nashville and Davidson County, because the government of Davidson County is consolidated with that of Nashville.

== History ==
Donelson encompasses the site of historic Buchanan's Station where settlers in the early Nashville settlements held off a major incursion into the area by a united Native American force comprising Lower Cherokee and Creek Indians hoping to destroy Nashville and drive the American frontiersman back across the Appalachian Mountains. The vastly outnumbered defenders held out, eventually driving the attackers away. Today, the only extant remains of the compound is the Buchanan cemetery on the northwest corner of Elm Hill Pike and Massman Drive.

Donelson was originally called "Spring Place" with the name not only referring to the former spring where Old Lebanon Road meets Lebanon Pike. But also the many mineral springs in the area. The spring was utilized as a stopping point for travelers to or from Nashville on what is today Lebanon Pike.

In the 1880s Donelson was a station on the Tennessee and Pacific Railroad just south of the former village of McWhirtersville on the Lebanon Pike. It began its modern development shortly after World War II, and its location next to Nashville's airport led to much of its later growth. It was also the site of an early example of what would later be called a shopping center or "strip mall", Donelson Plaza.

Donelson's oldest neighborhood is Bluefields. The development of the Bluefields subdivision began in 1929 by the Bransford Realty Company of Nashville, Tennessee. Home construction began in the early 1930s, with fifty to sixty homes built by the Bransford Realty Company by the end of 1938. The final phase of building, Bluefield Square, was developed in the 1970s on the property once occupied by the Swiss Farm Dairy within Bluefields proper. The Bluefields Historic District was added to the National Register of Historic Places listings in Davidson County, Tennessee on March 22, 2016.

Donelson is now an example of an early postwar suburb with a stock of mostly half-century-old, red brick, detached ranch-style homes. However, there has been some tendency for infill in recent years, largely tied into the expansion of sewers. The area's desirability was increased somewhat by the impoundment of Percy Priest Lake on the Stones River in the late 1960s which increased summertime recreational opportunities.

Donelson was the home of the Opryland USA theme park, which closed in 1997. This property is now the Opry Mills shopping mall and the Grand Ole Opry. It is usually considered as something of a unit along with the adjacent neighborhood of Hermitage just across the Stones River along U.S. 70; the two communities share a Chamber of Commerce.

Donelson is home to hundreds of small and medium-sized local businesses. Hip Donelson, a tax exempt 501(c)3 created to promote and develop the local community, lists over 100 Donelson, Tennessee businesses that operate in the neighborhood. Donelson is also home to the national headquarters of HarperCollins Christian Publishers, a new branch of Nashville State University, and over 40 hotels and motels that cater to tourists and business travelers using BNA International Airport.

In recent years, Donelson has shown high demand as a desirable place to live, and is commonly discussed as one of the next Nashville neighborhoods set for explosive growth. A 2016 article on Realtor.com cited Donelson as the 15th most desirable zip code in the United States. Donelson is one of about 26 suburban neighborhoods of Nashville.

As with most communities which are not census-designated places, making a realistic estimate of the community's population is very problematic. Donelson is generally considered to be coextensive with the United States Postal Service's ZIP code 37214, which is the ZIP code for the Nashville Post Office's Donelson Station. According to the US Census Bureau 2016 estimates the population for the zip code 37214 was 30,230.

The community has a station on the WeGo Star commuter rail line, which began operation in September 2006.

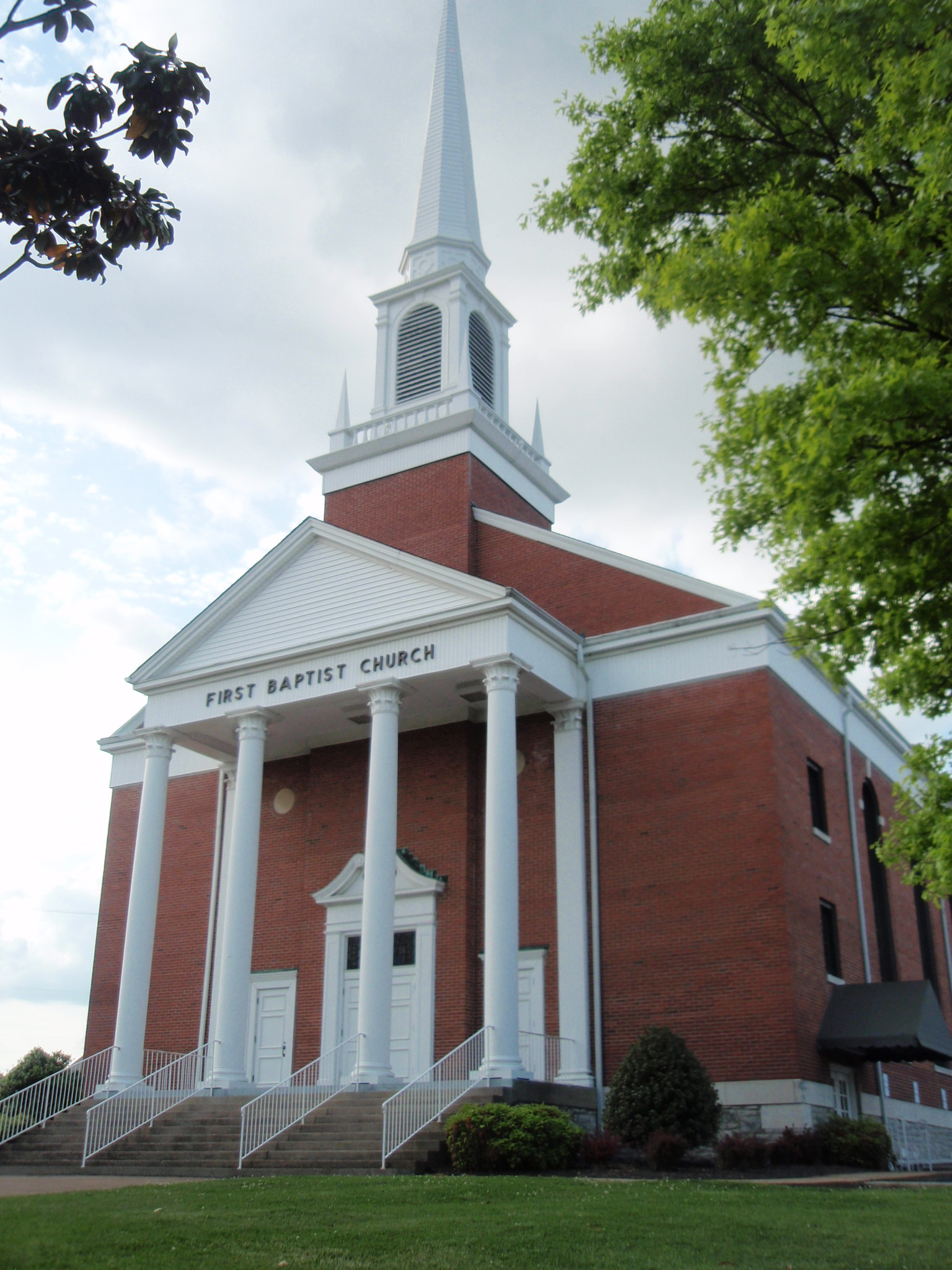
First Baptist Church of Donelson

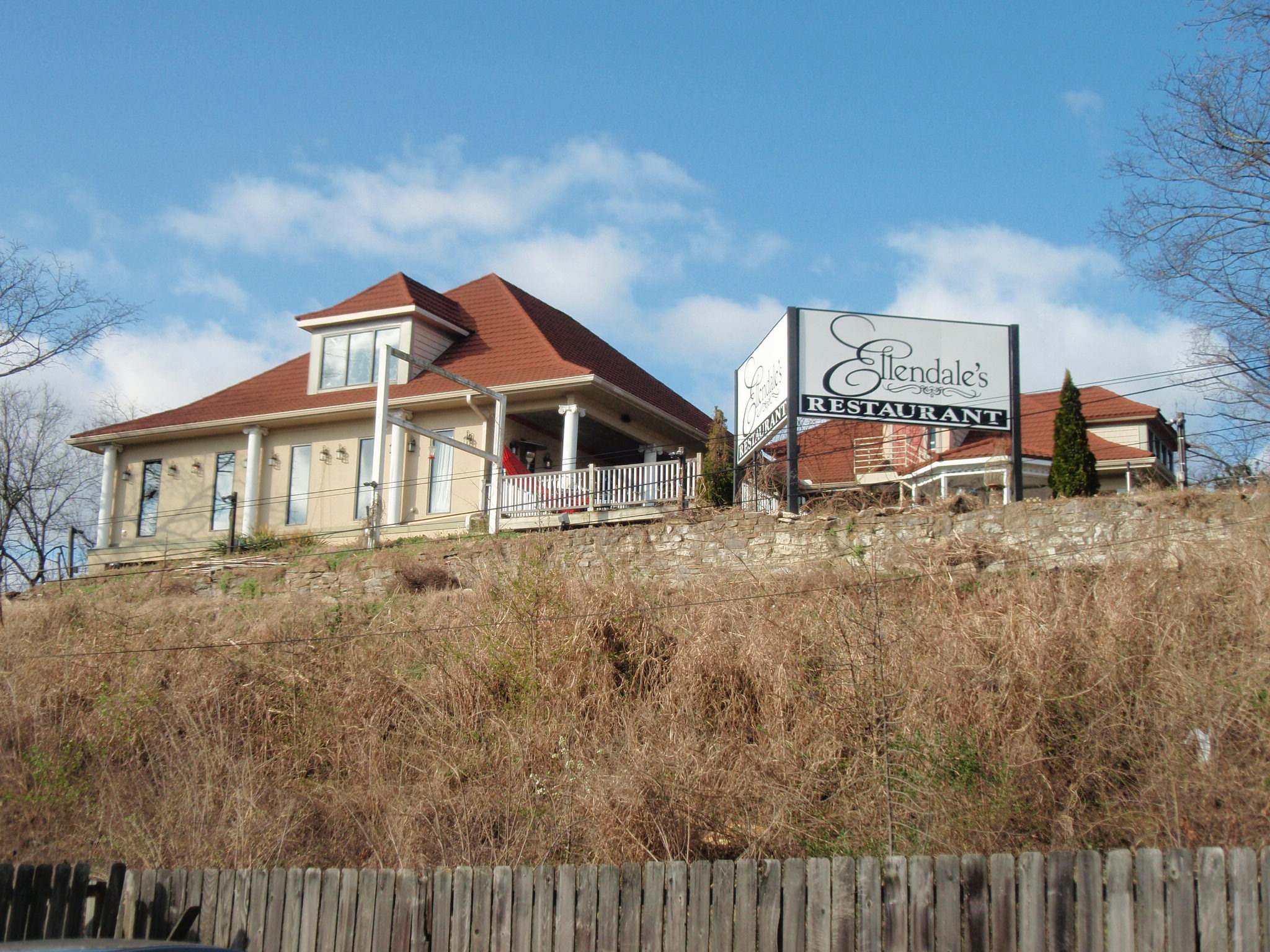
Ellendale's Restaurant in Donelson

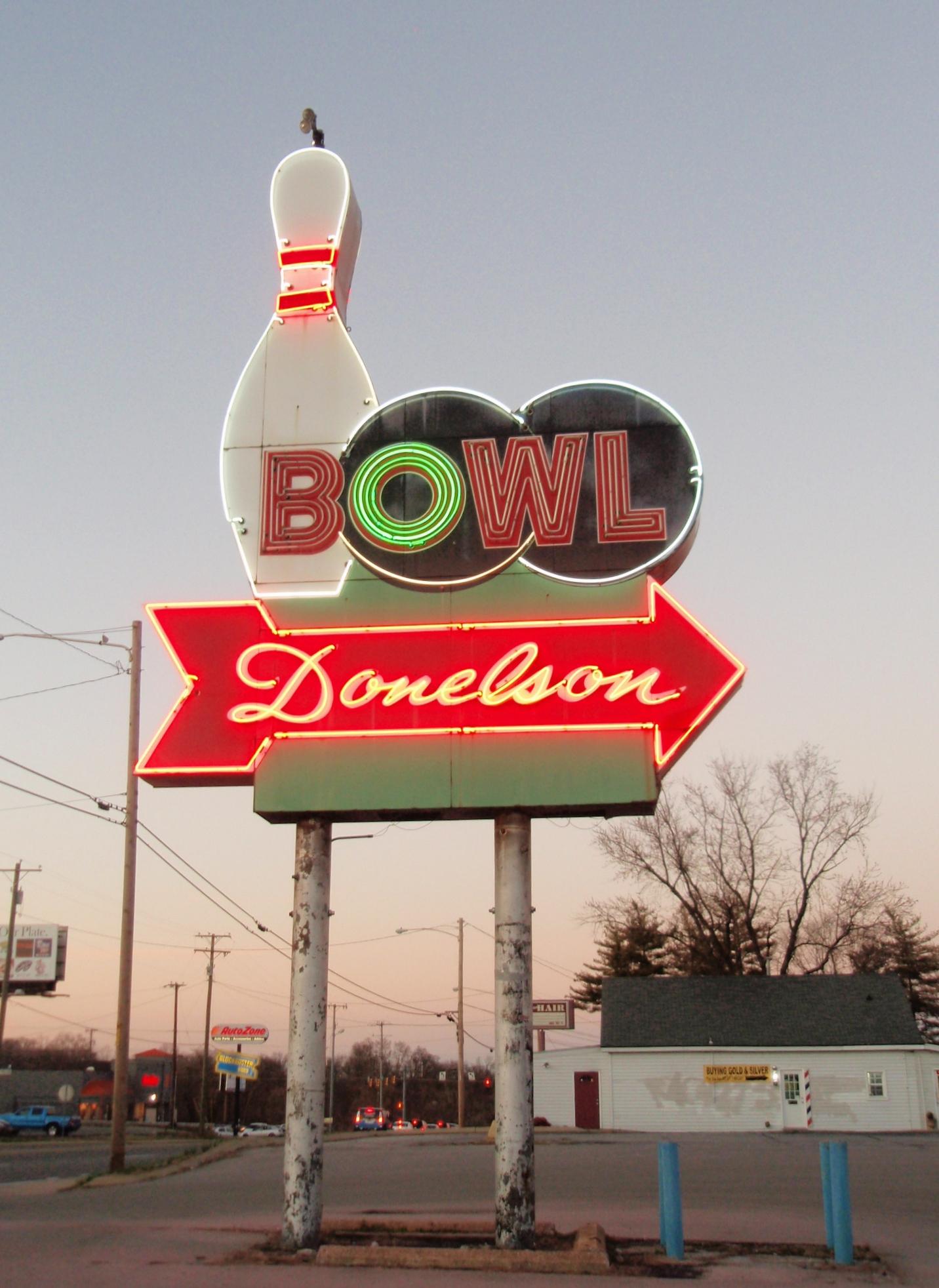
Donelson Bowl

== Geography ==
Donelson is located adjacent to Nashville International Airport.

=== Climate ===
The mean annual temperature at Nashville International Airport is 60.8 °F (16.0 °C). Monthly averages range from 39.6 °F (4.2 °C) in January to 80.7 °F (27.1 °C) in July, with a diurnal temperature variation of 18.9 to 23.7 °F (10.5 to 13.2 °C). Diurnal temperature variation is highest in April and lowest in December, but it is also relatively high in October and relatively low in January. Donelson's climate classifications are Köppen Cfa and Trewartha CFak thanks to its very hot summers (average over 71.6 °F (22.0 °C)), mild winters (average over 32.0 °F (0.0 °C)) and long (8+ months) growing seasons (average over 50.0 °F (10.0 °C)). Precipitation is abundant year-round without any major difference, but there is still slight variation. The wet season runs from February through July, reaching its zenith in May with 128 mm of rain. The dry season runs from August through January with an October nadir of 85 mm and secondary December peak of 113 mm.

Climate data for Nashville (Nashville Int'l), 1991–2020 normals, (Note: Mean monthly maxima and minima (i.e. the expected highest and lowest temperature readings at any point during the year or given month) calculated based on data at said location from 1991 to 2020.) extremes 1873−present (Note: Official records for Nashville were kept at downtown from December 1973 to December 1939, and at Nashville Int'l since January 1940. For more information, see Threadex)
| Month | Jan | Feb | Mar | Apr | May | Jun | Jul | Aug | Sep | Oct | Nov | Dec | Year |
|---|---|---|---|---|---|---|---|---|---|---|---|---|---|
| Record high °F (°C) | 78 (26) | 85 (29) | 89 (32) | 91 (33) | 96 (36) | 109 (43) | 107 (42) | 106 (41) | 105 (41) | 99 (37) | 88 (31) | 79 (26) | 109 (43) |
| Mean maximum °F (°C) | 68.5 (20.3) | 73.3 (22.9) | 80.1 (26.7) | 85.3 (29.6) | 89.9 (32.2) | 94.7 (34.8) | 97.1 (36.2) | 96.7 (35.9) | 93.4 (34.1) | 86.4 (30.2) | 78.1 (25.6) | 69.6 (20.9) | 98.5 (36.9) |
| Mean daily maximum °F (°C) | 49.1 (9.5) | 53.8 (12.1) | 62.7 (17.1) | 72.6 (22.6) | 80.4 (26.9) | 87.7 (30.9) | 90.9 (32.7) | 90.4 (32.4) | 84.4 (29.1) | 73.5 (23.1) | 61.4 (16.3) | 52.2 (11.2) | 71.6 (22.0) |
| Daily mean °F (°C) | 39.6 (4.2) | 43.4 (6.3) | 51.5 (10.8) | 60.8 (16.0) | 69.3 (20.7) | 77.1 (25.1) | 80.7 (27.1) | 79.7 (26.5) | 73.1 (22.8) | 61.7 (16.5) | 50.3 (10.2) | 42.7 (5.9) | 60.8 (16.0) |
| Mean daily minimum °F (°C) | 30.1 (−1.1) | 33.0 (0.6) | 40.2 (4.6) | 48.9 (9.4) | 58.3 (14.6) | 66.4 (19.1) | 70.5 (21.4) | 69.0 (20.6) | 61.8 (16.6) | 49.9 (9.9) | 39.2 (4.0) | 33.3 (0.7) | 50.1 (10.1) |
| Mean minimum °F (°C) | 11.2 (−11.6) | 15.4 (−9.2) | 22.7 (−5.2) | 32.7 (0.4) | 43.1 (6.2) | 55.2 (12.9) | 62.4 (16.9) | 60.2 (15.7) | 47.3 (8.5) | 33.3 (0.7) | 23.5 (−4.7) | 17.4 (−8.1) | 9.0 (−12.8) |
| Record low °F (°C) | −17 (−27) | −13 (−25) | 2 (−17) | 23 (−5) | 34 (1) | 42 (6) | 51 (11) | 47 (8) | 36 (2) | 26 (−3) | −1 (−18) | −10 (−23) | −17 (−27) |
| Average precipitation inches (mm) | 4.02 (102) | 4.47 (114) | 4.52 (115) | 4.72 (120) | 5.02 (128) | 4.36 (111) | 4.16 (106) | 3.79 (96) | 3.80 (97) | 3.36 (85) | 3.86 (98) | 4.43 (113) | 50.51 (1,283) |
| Average snowfall inches (cm) | 2.0 (5.1) | 1.5 (3.8) | 0.7 (1.8) | 0.0 (0.0) | 0.0 (0.0) | 0.0 (0.0) | 0.0 (0.0) | 0.0 (0.0) | 0.0 (0.0) | 0.0 (0.0) | 0.1 (0.25) | 0.4 (1.0) | 4.7 (12) |
| Average precipitation days (≥ 0.01 in) | 10.8 | 10.9 | 11.6 | 11.2 | 11.6 | 10.7 | 10.3 | 9.4 | 7.8 | 8.4 | 9.0 | 11.4 | 123.1 |
| Average snowy days (≥ 0.1 in) | 2.0 | 1.9 | 0.9 | 0.0 | 0.0 | 0.0 | 0.0 | 0.0 | 0.0 | 0.0 | 0.2 | 0.5 | 5.5 |
| Average relative humidity (%) | 70.4 | 68.5 | 64.6 | 63.2 | 69.5 | 70.4 | 72.8 | 73.1 | 73.7 | 69.4 | 70.2 | 71.4 | 69.8 |
| Average dew point °F (°C) | 26.4 (−3.1) | 29.5 (−1.4) | 36.9 (2.7) | 45.1 (7.3) | 55.9 (13.3) | 63.9 (17.7) | 68.0 (20.0) | 66.9 (19.4) | 61.2 (16.2) | 48.4 (9.1) | 39.4 (4.1) | 31.3 (−0.4) | 47.7 (8.7) |
| Mean monthly sunshine hours | 139.6 | 145.2 | 191.3 | 231.5 | 261.8 | 277.7 | 279.0 | 262.1 | 226.4 | 216.8 | 148.1 | 130.6 | 2,510.1 |
| Percentage possible sunshine | 45 | 48 | 52 | 59 | 60 | 64 | 63 | 63 | 61 | 62 | 48 | 43 | 56 |
| Average ultraviolet index | 2 | 4 | 6 | 7 | 9 | 10 | 10 | 9 | 7 | 5 | 3 | 2 | 6 |
Source 1: NOAA (relative humidity, dew point, and sun 1961−1990)
Source 2: Weather Atlas (UV index) WMO
