= Martha (disambiguation) =

Martha is a biblical figure.

Martha may also refer to:

== People ==
- Martha (given name), a given name (including a list of people and characters with the name)

== Places ==
=== United States ===
- Martha, Alabama, an unincorporated community now called "Hacoda"
- Martha, Kentucky, an unincorporated community
- Martha, New Jersey, an unincorporated community within Bass River Township
- Martha, Oklahoma, a town
- Martha, Tennessee, an unincorporated community

=== Other ===
- 205 Martha, an asteroid
- St Martha, Surrey, a civil parish in England
- St Martha's Hill, and St Martha's Church, Surrey, United Kingdom

== Arts, entertainment, and media ==
=== Fictional elements ===
- Marthas, a class of women in Margaret Atwood's novel The Handmaid's Tale and its television adaptation

=== Films ===
- Martha (1923 film), an American Disney short film
- Martha (1936 film), a German film directed by Karl Anton
- Martha (1967 film), a Danish film directed by Erik Balling
- Martha (1974 film), a German TV film written and directed by Rainer Werner Fassbinder
- Martha, a 2015 American short film directed by Sam Benenati and produced by Filippo Nesci
- Martha (2024 film), a documentary film about Martha Stewart

=== Music ===
- Martha (band), an English punk band from Durham
- Martha (opera), by Friedrich von Flotow
- Martha and the Muffins, a Canadian pop rock group known for their hit "Echo Beach"
- Martha and the Vandellas, an American pop vocal group
- "Martha My Dear", a song by The Beatles from their White Album (1968)
- "Martha", a song by Jefferson Airplane from their album After Bathing at Baxter's (1967)
- "Martha", a song by Tom Waits from his album Closing Time (1973)
- "Martha", a song by Rufus Wainwright from his album All Days Are Nights: Songs for Lulu (2010)

=== Television ===
- Martha Speaks (TV series), a 2008 children's animated sitcom
- Martha (TV series), a television talk show hosted by Martha Stewart

== Other uses ==
- Martha (grape), a grape cultivar
- Martha (passenger pigeon), the last passenger pigeon
- Martha (ship), several ships
- Martha organisation, a non-profit organisation based in Finland

== See also ==
- Marta (disambiguation)
