= Martha, Tennessee =

- Unincorporated community
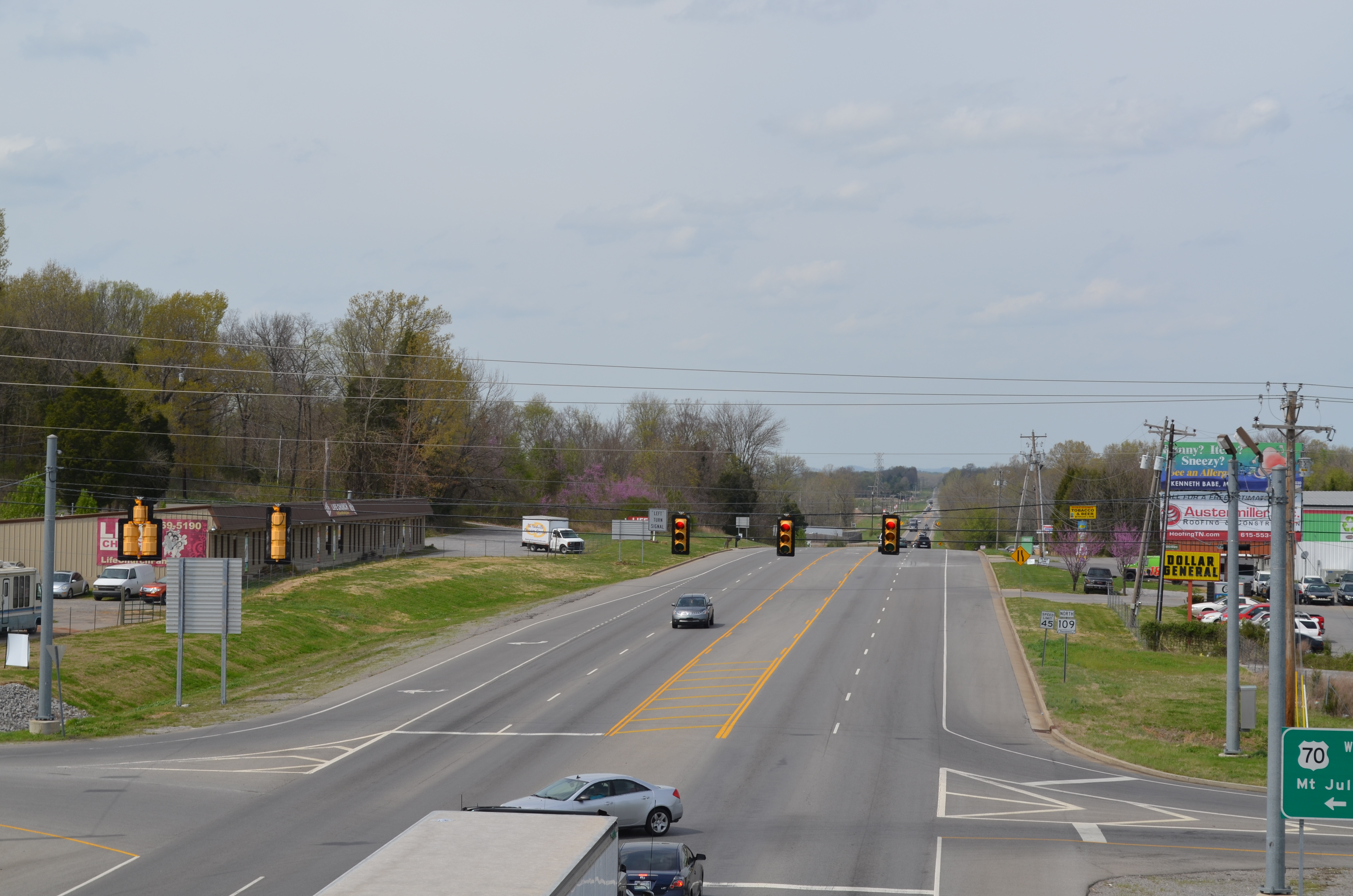
- Martha as seen from U.S. Route 70.

- Coordinates: 36°13′47″N 86°25′37″W
- Country: United States
- State: Tennessee
- County: Wilson
- Elevation: 518 ft (158 m)
- Time zone: UTC-6 (Central (CST))
  - Summer (DST): UTC-5 (CDT)
- Area code: 615
- GNIS feature ID: 1292781

Martha is an unincorporated community in Wilson County, Tennessee. It is located along State Route 109 and U.S. Route 70. The community has a handful of businesses and a station on the WeGo Star commuter rail service.

Some of Martha has been annexed by the city of Lebanon.
