= Marta =

Marta may refer to:

== People ==
- Marta (given name), a feminine given name
- Märta, a feminine given name
- Marta (surname)
- Marta (footballer) (born 1986), Brazilian professional footballer

== Places ==
- Marta (river), an Italian river that flows into the Tyrrhenian Sea
- Marta, Lazio, a comune in Italy
- Marta, Nepal, a village development committee

== Arts and entertainment ==
- Marta (1955 film), a Spanish drama film
- Marta (1971 film), a Spanish film
- "Marta" (Nena Daconte song), 2005
- "Marta" (Ricardo Arjona song), 2011
- "Marta", a song by Alejandra Guzmán, from the album Indeleble
- "Marta," a song composed by Moisés Simons
- "Marta, Rambling Rose of the Wildwood", a 1931 song by Arthur Tracy

== MARTA (abbr.) ==
- Metropolitan Atlanta Rapid Transit Authority, the principal public transit system in the Atlanta metropolitan area
- Mountain Area Regional Transit Authority, the third largest regional transit agency in San Bernardino County, California
- MARTa Herford, a contemporary art museum in Herford, Germany

== Other uses ==
- Battle of Marta, a Moorish victory over the Byzantines in North Africa in 547

== See also ==
- Martha (disambiguation)
