= List of ships named Martha =

Several ships have borne the name Martha:

- Martha was a merchant ship flying the British flag when USS Boston captured her on 10 March 1778.
- Martha (1796 ship) was built on the Thames River. The British East India Company chartered her for a voyage to Bengal, where she wrecked.
- Martha (1799 ship) was constructed in Sydney, the schooner was a sealer and merchant vessel that wrecked near Sydney, Australia, in August 1800.
- Martha (1810 ship) was launched at Quebec. In 1818 she transported convicts to New South Wales. She remained in the South Pacific as a whaler until she was condemned in 1820 as unseaworthy and then sold for breaking up.
- Martha was an American slaver, confronted by USS Perry in June 1860
