= Marta (surname) =

Marta is the surname of the following people:

- Eneida Marta, singer from Guinea-Bissau active since 1990s
- István Márta (born 1952), Hungarian composer and theater and festival director
- Jack Marta (1903–1991), American cinematographer
- Lynne Marta (born 1946), American actress
- Pyotr Marta (1952–2023), Soviet freestyle wrestler
- Robert Marta (1943–2017), American cameraman, Society of Operating Cameramen first president, son of Jack Marta
- Samer Al Marta (born 1972), Kuwaiti footballer
