= Marth =

Marth may refer to:

- Marth, Thuringia, Germany

== People with the surname ==
- Albert Marth (1828–1897), German astronomer
- Christophe Marth (born 1980), French rugby player
- Frank Marth (1922–2014), American actor
- Tommy Marth (1978–2012), American saxophonist who performed with The Killers

== Other uses ==
- Marth (Fire Emblem), a video game character
- Marth (lunar crater), a crater on the Moon
- Marth (Martian crater), a crater on Mars
