= Sainte-Marthe =

Sainte-Marthe (French for Saint Martha) may refer to:

== People ==
- Antoine André de Sainte-Marthe (1615–1679), French soldier, governor of Martinique
- Charles de Sainte-Marthe (1512–1555), French Protestant and theologian
- Scévole de Sainte-Marthe (1536–1623), French poet
- Scévole de Sainte-Marthe (1571–1650), French historian

== Places ==
=== Canada ===
- Sainte-Marthe, Quebec, in Montérégie region, Quebec
- Sainte-Marthe-de-Gaspé, a community in La Martre, Quebec
- Sainte-Marthe-du-Cap, former town in Quebec, now part of City of Trois-Rivières
- Sainte-Marthe-sur-le-Lac, in Laurentides, Quebec

=== France ===
- Sainte-Marthe, Eure département
- Sainte-Marthe, Lot-et-Garonne département

== See also ==
- Saint Martha (disambiguation)
