= Riverfront station =

Train station in Tennessee

Coordinates: 36.162°N 86.774°W

Riverfront
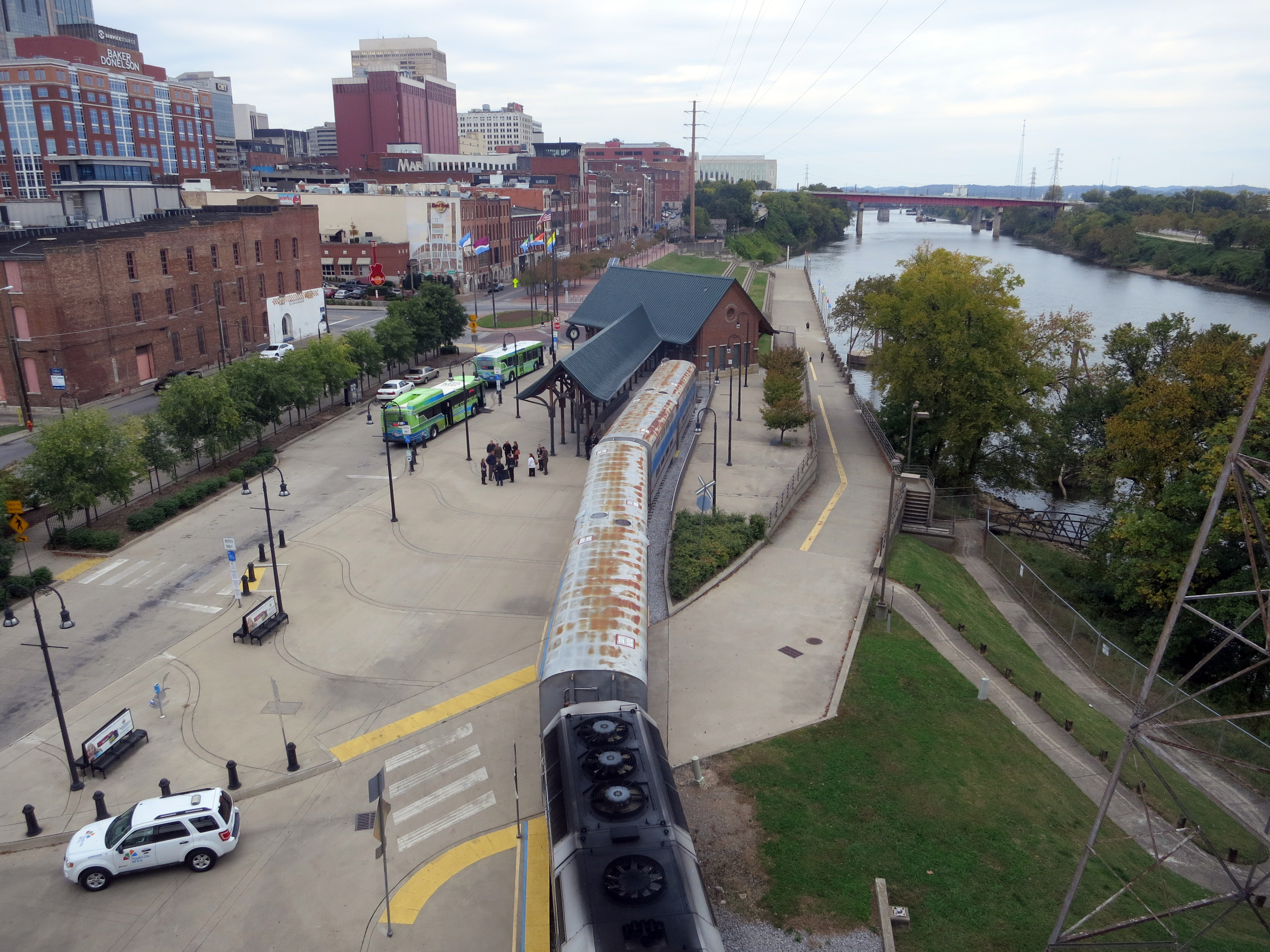
- A commuter train at Nashville Riverfront in 2013.

General information
- Location: 108 1st Avenue South; Nashville, Tennessee
- Owner: WeGo Public Transit
- Line: Nashville and Eastern Railroad
- Platforms: 1 side platform
- Tracks: 1
- Connections: WeGo Public Transit: 64, 93

Construction
- Accessible: Yes

History
- Opened: September 18, 2006
- Closed: 1955 (Tennessee Central)

Services
Preceding station	WeGo Star	Following station
Terminus	East Corridor line	Donelson toward Lebanon
Former services
Preceding station	Tennessee Central Railway	Following station
Terminus	Eastern Division	Shops toward Harriman
Location

Riverfront station is a train station in Nashville, Tennessee, serving the WeGo Star commuter rail service. Located at 108 1st Avenue South in Downtown Nashville near the John Seigenthaler Pedestrian Bridge, it serves as the western terminus for the line. No parking facilities are available at the station, however, connecting bus service is provided via WeGo Public Transit buses. It is within walking distance of Nissan Stadium via the previously mentioned John Seigenthaler Pedestrian Bridge.

The two bus lines servicing the station are Route 64 (Star Downtown Shuttle) and Route 93 (Star West End Shuttle).

== History ==
The site of the current station was originally home to a train depot built around 1902. The depot included a passenger station for the Tennessee Central Railway as well as several tracks used for freight service. Passenger service at the original station ended in 1955.

Site excavation for the new station began in 2004, but was delayed for several months due to the discovery of historic artifacts at the site, including the remains of a foundry. Construction of the new station began in August 2005. The design of the new station, which features post and beam architecture, was intended to evoke the feel of an Old World train station. Service at the station began on September 18, 2006, and still operates daily.
