= WeGo Star =

Commuter rail service between Nashville and Lebanon, Tennessee

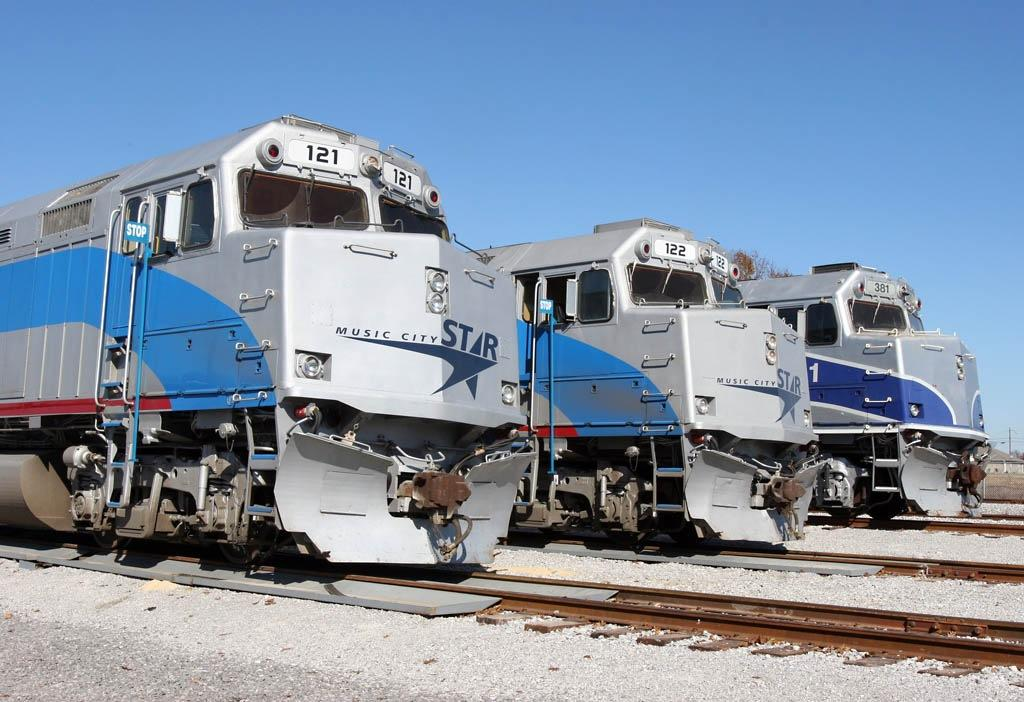
- Three ex-Amtrak EMD F40PH locomotives in use by the WeGo Star lined up within the Lebanon, Tennessee yards. The third F40PH on the far right is painted in its original Pacific Surfliner scheme; all three locomotives have since been repainted.

Overview
- Owner: Tennessee Department of Transportation
- Locale: Nashville Metropolitan Area
- Transit type: Commuter rail
- Number of stations: 7
- Annual ridership: 153,900 (2025)
- Website: wegotransit.com

Operation
- Began operation: September 18, 2006
- Operator: Tennessee Regional Transportation Authority
- Reporting marks: NRTX
- Number of vehicles: 4 locomotives 11 coaches
- Train length: 2-3 gallery cars

Technical
- System length: 32 mi (51 km)
- Track gauge: 4 ft 8 1/2 in (1,435 mm) standard gauge
- Average speed: 37 mph (60 km/h)
- Top speed: 79 mph (127 km/h)
System map
WeGo Star highlighted in purple

The WeGo Star (reporting mark NRTX), formerly the Music City Star, is a commuter rail service running between Nashville and Lebanon, Tennessee. The service uses the existing track of the Nashville and Eastern Railroad. The line stops at seven stations: Riverfront (Nashville), Donelson, Hermitage, Mt. Juliet, Martha, Hamilton Springs, and Lebanon. The operation covers 32 miles (51 km) of rail line. Service began on September 18, 2006. In 2025, the line had a ridership of 153,900.

The Star is considered a "starter" project to demonstrate the effectiveness of commuter rail service to the metro Nashville area. Expansion plans include as many as six more lines, terminating in Gallatin, Columbia, Murfreesboro, Dickson, Springfield, and Clarksville via Ashland City. All are planned to use existing CSX Transportation railroad lines. The planned seven lines meet in central Nashville in a star formation, hence the original name of the system, which also alludes to the city's many country music stars.

The Star is the first passenger train service of any kind for Nashville since the discontinuation of Amtrak's Floridian in 1979. The Nashville and Eastern line, part of the former Tennessee Central Railway, had not seen passenger service for many decades prior to the Star, with the exception of excursion trains operated by the Tennessee Central Railway Museum and the Broadway Dinner Train.

== History ==
The train began operations on September 18, 2006, becoming the 18th commuter rail system in the United States, with a projected daily ridership of 1,500 passengers. The service launched with an estimated annual cost of $3.3 million, of which $1.3 million was covered by revenues.

In the first month after service began, ridership failed to reach the projected goals, a situation which continued for several years, culminating with a financial shortfall of $1.7 million by the summer of 2008, of which the state of Tennessee covered $1 million in a bailout of the service. Financial difficulties continued into the next year; in June 2009, the service was nearly shut down for lack of funds until state and local authorities granted the service $4.4 million to continue service until 2011.

During 2010, a third passenger car was added to all WeGo Star trains to accommodate increasing ridership.

On May 2, 2010, the East Corridor line was closed because of damage related to the floods that hit Middle Tennessee. Flood waters pushed tracks off a concrete trestle over Sinking Creek in downtown Lebanon. This trapped Star trains at their Lebanon storage yard, causing RTA to suspend service until the trestle was repaired. MTA substituted chartered buses instead, picking up passengers at all stations except Martha. The line was repaired in one week.

Following the Nashville MTA rebranding to WeGo Public Transit in 2018, the Music City Star was renamed the WeGo Star.

The COVID-19 pandemic in Tennessee in 2020 briefly resulted in the shutdown of Star rail service, but service resumed on June 15, 2020, with eight trains each weekday — two each way in the morning and two more in the afternoon.

A proposed expansion of the system to Clarksville and Ashland City utilizing the Nashville and Western Railroad right of way is projected to cost $525 million.

== Operation ==
Currently, there is only one line, and this train service is the only public train in Tennessee. However there are six more planned to other satellite cities around Nashville in the future.

=== East Corridor line ===
The current line is 32 miles (51 km) long with seven stations. There are six round trips, although two of them only go as far as Mt. Juliet. The line is mostly single-track, so this limits arrivals and departures to how long each train has to wait for the other to pass. The first "starter line" cost $41 million, or just under $1.3 million per mile, which made it the most cost-efficient commuter rail start-up in the nation. The line was previously run by the Nashville, Chattanooga and St. Louis until 1930. It reopened 76 years later.

==== Stations ====
- Riverfront station
- Donelson station
- Hermitage station
- Mt. Juliet station
- Martha station
- Hamilton Springs station
- Lebanon station

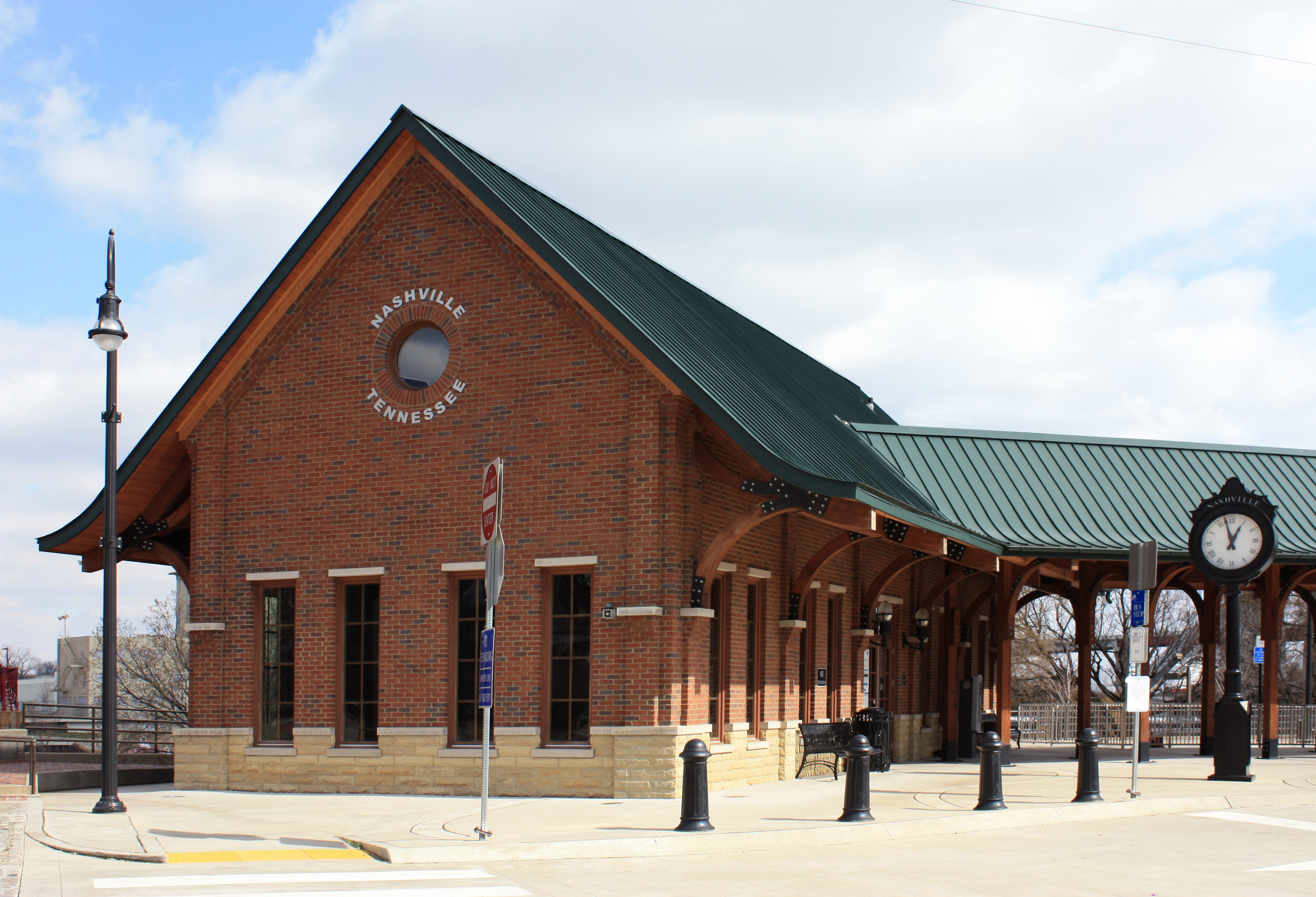
Riverfront station in downtown Nashville

== Rolling stock ==
=== Current locomotives ===
Models	Built	Number	Road Numbers
F40PH-2	1980-1985	3	120–122
F40PHR	1981	1	381

=== Coaches ===
Numbers	Type	Heritage	Built	Quantity	Builder	Disposition
500-504	Coach	Chicago and North Western	1961	5	Pullman-Standard	401 and 504 operating as backup set, remainder retired in 2020. 402 retained for fire department training. Still painted in Music City Star colors.
400-402	Coach/Cab	Chicago and North Western	1968	3	Pullman-Standard	401 and 504 operating as backup set, remainder retired in 2020. 402 retained for fire department training. Still painted in Music City Star colors.
701, 708, 712, 719, 723, 733	Coach	Burlington Route	1950-53	6	Budd	Acquired 2020 from MiTrain. Painted in WeGo Public Transit colors.
790 and 795	Coach/Cab	Burlington Route	1965	2	Budd	Acquired 2020 from MiTrain. Painted in WeGo Public Transit colors.

The WeGo Star regional rail service is currently served by four rebuilt ex-Amtrak EMD F40PH locomotives and eight former Chicago Metra coaches, standard gauge. The coaches are bilevel rail cars with seating on both levels.

Since 2022, all four F40PH locomotives have been rebuilt and repainted into the new WeGo paint scheme. 381 previously wore Amtrak's Pacific Surfliner paint scheme until late 2020. Almost all of the former Pullman-Standard coaches were withdrawn from service around 2020 and replaced with corrugated stainless steel Budd bi-level coaches; two of the older coaches remain in service and are still used on occasion.

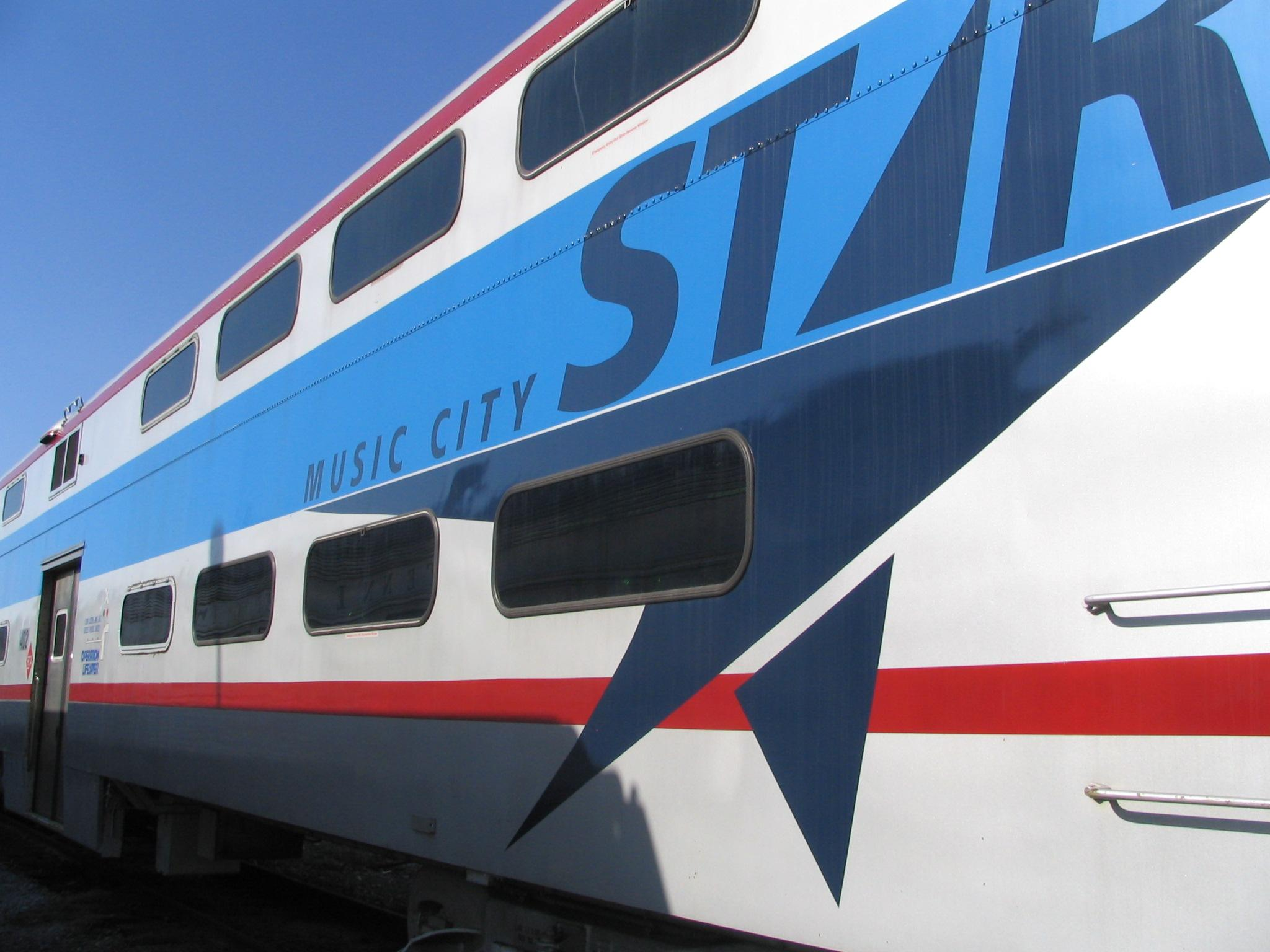
An original multi-level passenger car as used by the WeGo Star

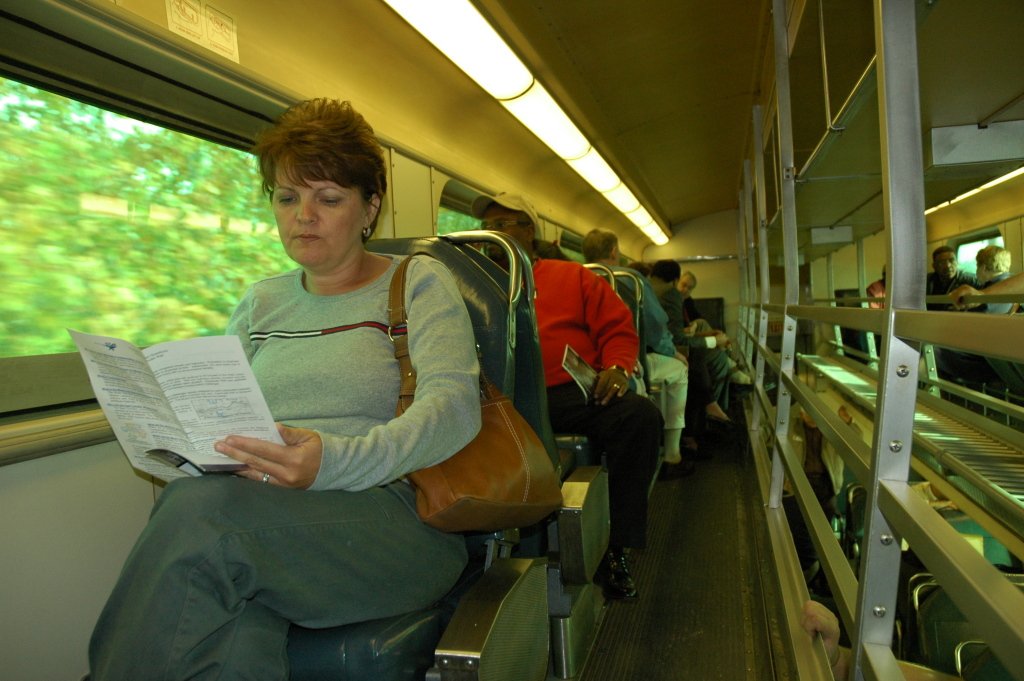
The interior view inside an original WeGo Star passenger coach

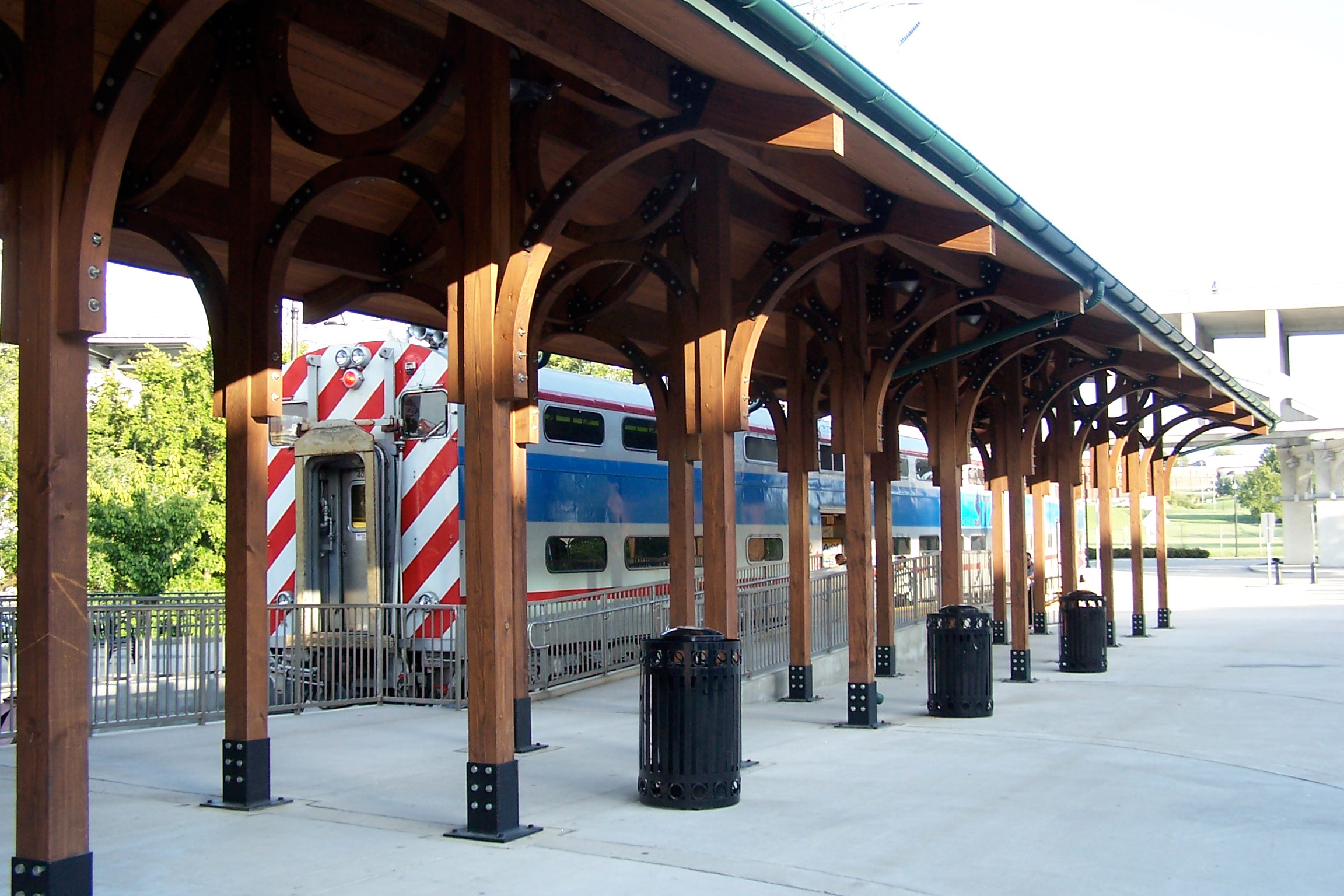
An original operating cab car end of a WeGo Star train at Riverfront station

== Ridership ==
WeGo Star ridership steadily increased from 104,785 passenger trips in 2007 to 277,148 trips in 2012. In 2013, ridership decreased to 253,421 trips, but then steadily increased to 298,800 passenger trips in 2018. In 2019 ridership slightly decreased to 292,500 passenger trips. During the 2020 pandemic, ridership plummeted to 77,200 with a majority of the rides being in the first quarter of the year, it fell further in 2021 to 57,500 although the 4th quarter saw immense improvement compared to the 4th quarter of 2020. 2022 saw a rebound in ridership, although not even half of pre-pandemic levels.

== See also ==
- List of United States railroads
  - List of Tennessee railroads
