= Lebanon station (Tennessee) =

Lebanon
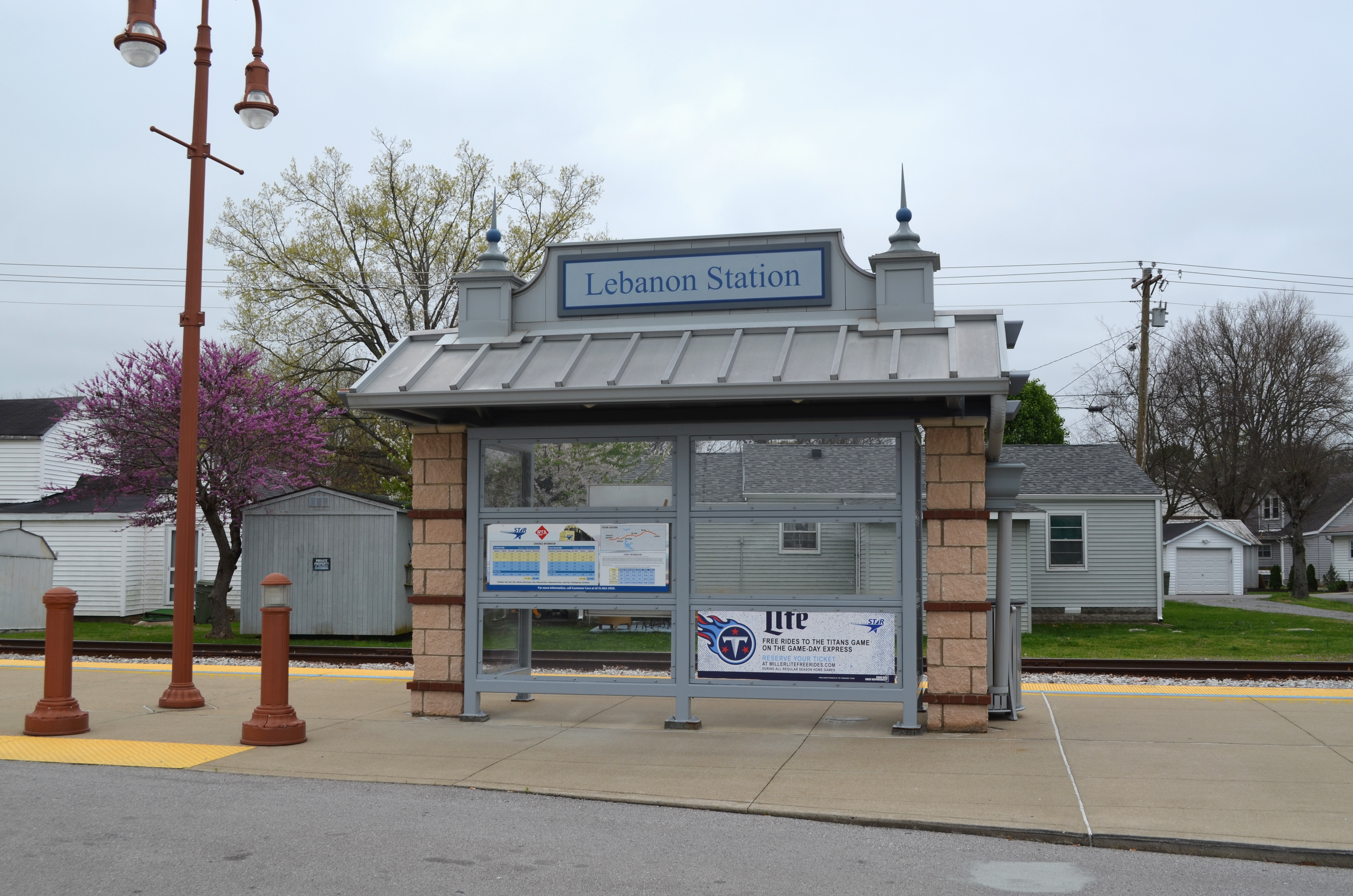

General information
- Location: 334 West Baddour Parkway; Lebanon, Tennessee
- Coordinates: 36.21211°N 86.29728°W
- Line: Nashville and Eastern Railroad
- Platforms: 1 side platform
- Tracks: 2

Construction
- Parking: 140 spaces
- Accessible: yes

History
- Opened: September 18, 2006 (Music City Star)

Services
| Preceding station | WeGo Star | Following station |
|---|---|---|
| Hamilton Springs toward Riverfront | East Corridor line | Terminus |
Location

Lebanon station is a train station in Lebanon, Tennessee, serving Nashville's commuter rail line, the WeGo Star. Service began September 18, 2006.
