= Tennessee Central Railway =

American railway

Overview
- Reporting mark: TC
- Locale: Tennessee
- Dates of operation: 1893–1968
- Successor: Nashville and Eastern Railroad (Nashville to Monterey)

Technical
- Track gauge: 4 ft 8 1/2 in (1,435 mm) standard gauge

The Tennessee Central Railway was founded in 1884 as the Nashville and Knoxville Railroad by Alexander S. Crawford. It was an attempt to open up a rail route from the coal and minerals of East Tennessee to the markets of the midstate, a service which many businessmen felt was not being adequately provided by the existing railroad companies. They also wanted to ship coal and iron ore to the Northeastern US over the Cincinnati Southern Railway, which was leased to the Southern and operated as the Cincinnati, New Orleans and Texas Pacific Railway (CNOTP), through their Cincinnati gateway. The N&K was only completed between Lebanon, where it connected to a Nashville, Chattanooga and St. Louis Railway branch from Nashville, and Standing Stone (now Monterey).

By the 1880s railroads were becoming a mature industry and it was not easy for a new competitor to break in. The firm and its successor companies would struggle for decades with both financial woes and hostility from the more established lines. (It was unable to use Nashville's ornate new Union Station terminal for instance, as that was controlled by the rival Louisville and Nashville Railroad and its subsidiary Nashville, Chattanooga & St. Louis.) The Tennessee Central linked Knoxville directly, by a link to the Southern Railway's subsidiary Harriman and Northeastern from Harriman to Knoxville, with Nashville via a route which ascended the Cumberland Plateau Escarpment at Walden's Ridge between Emory Gap and Crossville. The traditional major route for this passage had been made via Chattanooga.

In 1893, enter the likes of entrepreneur "Colonel" Jere Baxter. He was known as charismatic and regarded as ruthless. Although no money could be found in Tennessee to complete the property that was to be the Tennessee Central, he traveled to St. Louis and eventually found backing. For much of his construction financing, he issued bonds. He organized and constructed four lines that, together with the N&K acquired from the Crawford family, were to become the Tennessee Central. The lines were reorganized in 1902 and renamed the Tennessee Central Railroad. Several versions of this name were used over a period of some thirty years, until the final name, Tennessee Central Railway, was adopted in 1922.

The line expanded slowly and piecemeal to the west and north of Nashville during this period, falling into receivership twice, in 1897 and 1912, on the latter occasion operating in technical insolvency for ten years. Baxter died in 1904, leaving as his heritage the now completed TC, which was heavily burdened with debt. Although the company was operating "in the black", they were unable to meet their bonded indebtedness, which was incurred from the building of the line. In 1905, the TC was leased for three years to the Illinois Central Railroad west of Nashville and the Southern east of Nashville. Due to unprofitable operations, neither line opted to renew their lease. In 1922, a group of investors led by Paul M. Davis bought the railroad at a bankruptcy sale, thus abolishing the bonded indebtedness. They hired former president Hugh Wright Stanley, who operated the line profitably (except during 1932 and 1933) until 1945. The first diesel-electric locomotive switcher was brought to Nashville in 1939 by the TC.

== Early 20th century passenger service ==
The TC had passenger service from Nashville to Harriman, with through service to Knoxville in cooperation with the Southern Railway. In 1936 it had a day and a night train in each direction on the route. The night train served as a section of the Carolina Special, however, passengers would need to switch to other coaches or sleepers at Knoxville to continue the trip to Asheville and eastern North Carolina and southeastern South Carolina.

== Postwar years and decline ==
Wartime traffic in the early 1940s brightened the financial picture, but after that hard times returned. Despite losses in 1946, a group of investors led by J. L. Armstrong bought out the Davis group. The last of the steam engines were pulled from service in 1952 due to the arrival of four diesel locomotives (along with 200 coal hoppers) financed by a Reconstruction Finance Corporation loan in the amount of $2.2 million. 1954 saw the opening of the first unit of the Tennessee Valley Authority's Kingston coal-fired power generating plant, which was largely fed coal from TC's own on-line coal mines operators. The company dropped money-losing passenger service on July 31, 1955, which by post-war years had narrowed to a single trip from Nashville to Harriman and a reverse trip. Also in that year, the TC ended operations of their steam locomotives.

1956 saw the TC purchase more diesel locomotives and coal hoppers with another RFC loan. Brief profitability was restored from 1949 through 1956. In 1957 the TVA began awarding contracts to non-TC coal mine operators and their traffic boom went bust. Although the program of right-of-way improvement and new equipment acquisition had been carried out, the firm at length was unable to repay the RFC loans and fell into its third and final receivership in 1968. On 14 December 1967, the TC's petition for bankruptcy was approved and service ceased on 31 August 1968. Its assets were sold off. Much of the Nashville beltline south of Nashville had already been sold to the state to build I-440. The Western Division from the western end of the I-440 right of way in Nashville to Hopkinsville, KY was purchased by the Illinois Central Railroad. The eastern end of the line from Harriman to the siding just west of Crossville went to the Southern Railway. The remaining middle portion from Crossville to Nashville went to its old and not at all friendly rival, the Louisville & Nashville.

At the end of 1956 TC operated 286 miles of road and 377 miles of track; that year it reported 278 million net revenue ton-miles of freight and 1 million passenger-miles. The Tennessee Central endured for over 80 years in the face of very tough odds, and played a considerable part in the economic development of its service region. It is still remembered fondly by many people in the small towns it served as "The Route of Personal Service," and is commemorated by a namesake institution, the Tennessee Central Railway Museum, in its former master mechanic's shop, which also was its headquarters in its final years.

== Surviving portions ==
The trackage between Monterey and Crossville was dismantled by the L&N in the 1980s, which has proven problematic to recent advocates of the restoration of passenger train service between Nashville and Knoxville. The Nashville and Eastern Railroad was formed to revive operation of the line's freight service to Old Hickory and Lebanon, approximately 30 miles east of Nashville, with occasional runs to points somewhat further east over the former L&N owned TC trackage. The N&E once participated in the operation of the Broadway Dinner Train out of Nashville. Today it hosts the WeGo Star commuter rail service between Nashville and Lebanon.

In 2000, the Nashville and Western Railroad was formed as subsidiary of the Nashville and Eastern to take over the operation of the old TC from Nashville to Ashland City, which was on the portion originally sold to the IC, but later operated by numerous short lines. The Cumberland River Bicentennial Trail extends approximately 14 miles west from Ashland City on the old TC roadbed. Eventually the Dept. of Defense took over the operation of the old TC from Hopkinsville to Fort Campbell. The rest of the TC line between the Trail's end and Fort Campbell has been abandoned.

At the eastern end, the former Tennessee Central remains in use between Crab Orchard, Tennessee and Rockwood, on the opposite side of Walden's Ridge, by Lhoist North America for movement of industrial mineral products. At Rockwood, Lhoist interchanges traffic with Norfolk Southern, which uses the ex-TC the rest of the way from Emory Gap to handle this business.

== See also ==
- Cookeville Railroad Depot
