= Nashville and Eastern Railroad =

American shortline railroad

Overview
- Headquarters: Lebanon, Tennessee
- Reporting mark: NERR
- Locale: Greater Nashville, Tennessee area
- Dates of operation: 1986–present

Technical
- Track gauge: 4 ft 8 1/2 in (1,435 mm) standard gauge

Other
- Website: www.rjcorman.com/companies/railroad-company/our-short-lines/nashville-eastern-line-nerr

The Nashville and Eastern Railroad (reporting mark NERR) is a shortline railroad which administers 137 miles (220 km) of track between Nashville and Monterey, Tennessee, of which 130 miles (210 km) are currently operational. The company is based in Lebanon, Tennessee.

== Operations ==
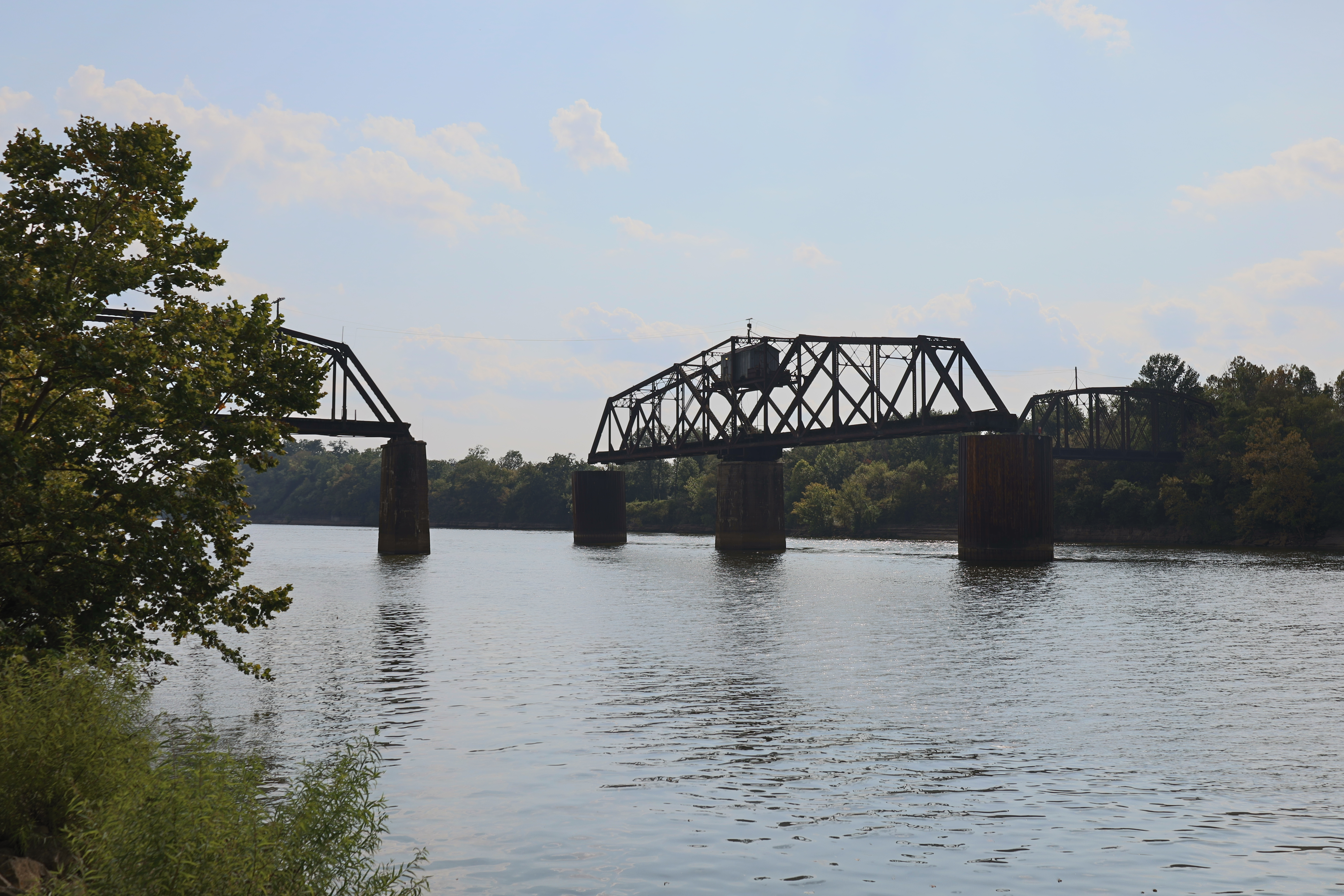
The Bordeaux Railroad Bridge carries the Nashville & Western Railroad over the Cumberland River in Nashville, Tennessee

The railroad spans between Nashville & Monterey with 3 smaller branch lines to Vine Hill, Old Hickory, and South Carthage respectively. The railroad notably serves Roger’s Group, serving their rock mine in Gordonsville, and sand mine in Monterey. The railroad provides freight shipping services to more than 30 other companies. It also runs occasional passenger excursion trains from Nashville to Watertown (formerly also Baxter and Monterey) in cooperation with the Tennessee Central Railway Museum in Nashville.

The railroad is the home of the WeGo Star commuter rail service between Nashville and Lebanon. Service began on September 18, 2006. The service is operated by the Regional Transportation Authority, Nashville's public transportation agency.

Here is N&E 573, a former Santa Fe B40-8W. It no longer retains its BNSF livery, now switched for the silver and red livery of the RJ Corman (with a special N&E decal applied to this specific unit).

NERR has a subsidiary, the Nashville & Western Railroad Corp. (reporting mark NWR), that operates between Nashville and Ashland City on the former western end of the Tennessee Central.

== History ==
The Nashville and Eastern was formed in the 1980s to reestablish freight service from Nashville to Lebanon and points east. The tracks that it operates were originally operated by the Tennessee Central Railway, which went out of business in 1968.

RJC 2596 and its sister unit, 2620 are seen leading the twice-weekly rock train from Gordonsville, Tennessee, to Nashville, Tennessee.

Here is N&E 5939, a former CSX B40-8 built in 1988. It and its sister unit, 5941 are commonly leased to the Tennessee Central Railway Museum for excursion trains.

On November 5, 2018, R.J. Corman Railroad Group announced that it had finalized an agreement to acquire both NERR and NWR as well as Transit Solution Group, operator of the WeGo Star commuter trains. Pending regulatory approval, R. J. Corman took over operations in January 2019.

=== Rolling stock ===
The Nashville & Eastern currently has 4 B40-8Ws (568, 573, 574, & 579), 2 CW40-8s (1776 & 2026), 2 SD70Ms indefinitely (2596 & 2620), 4 B40-8s (5938, 5939, 5940, & 5941), 1 B39-8E (8531), and 1 SW1500 (1503) as a shop switcher in Lebanon.

Former rolling stock includes U30B 'U-Boats', around 15 CF7s, a few B23-7s unknown amount of ALCO RSD-12, a few ALCO Century 420s, and recreational EMD E-units, some of which have not been seen, nor recorded for a few years. Note: 2 EMD SD40-2s were originally on rock train duty between 2022-2023, but have since gone to other short lines owned by the RJ Corman. Note: There may be more locomotives that have not been documented or are not known. 4 former N&E-painted locomotives are either preserved or are still known to exist in some way, U28B 5323 is preserved at the Southern Appalachia Railway Museum, part of U30B 5330’s cab still remains at Oak Ridge, TN, B30-7 805 is known to still be used as a switcher in Mexico (exact location currently is unknown), and Nashville & Western-painted U23B 3901 is still seen mostly intact at Larry’s Truck & Electric.

Former Nashville & Eastern U28B #5323 sits at the Southern Appalachia Railway Museum, this is the only N&E painted locomotive in preservation.

All N&E locomotives have been acquired by a variety of different means. B39-8Es were acquired from LMX, B40-8s were acquired from the CSX, B40-8Ws and early B23-7s were acquired from the Atchison, Topeka and Santa Fe Railway and BNSF Railway, SD70Ms were acquired from Norfolk Southern, CW40-8s were acquired from CSX, and most of their earlier locomotives were primarily also from CSX. Note: The SD70Ms and CW40-8s are owned by RJ Corman themselves and not by the N&E.
