= Absalom Lowe Landis House =

Historic house in Tennessee, United States

- U.S. National Register of Historic Places
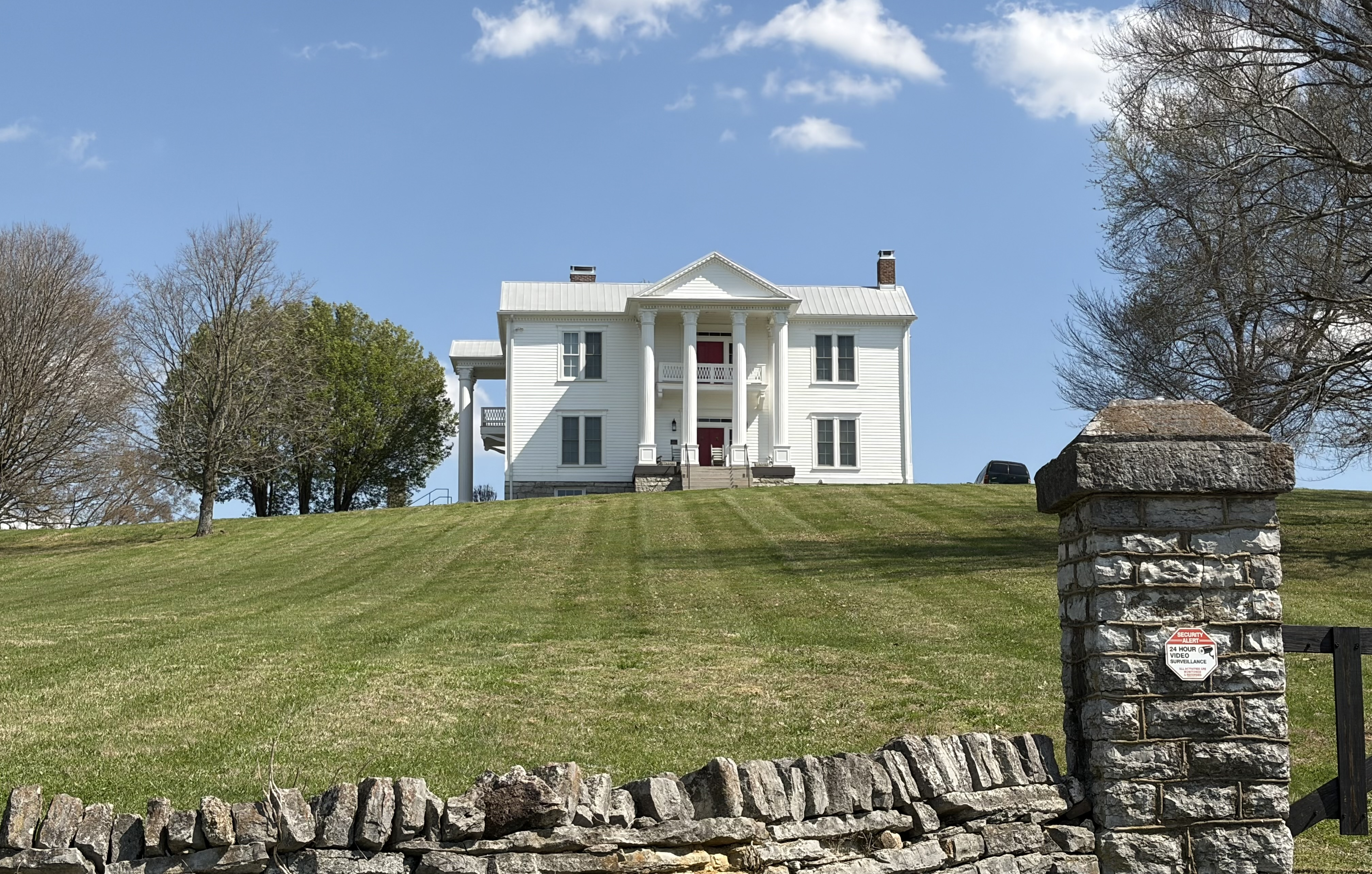
- The Absalom Lowe Landis House in 2026

- Location within Tennessee Location within the United States
- Nearest city: Normandy, Tennessee
- Coordinates: 35°26′51″N 86°19′25″W
- Area: 9.5 acres (3.8 ha)
- Built: 1866
- Architectural style: Greek Revival
- NRHP reference No.: 87001034
- Added to NRHP: June 25, 1987

The Absalom Lowe Landis House, also known as Beech Hall, is a historic house in Normandy, Tennessee.

== History ==
The house was built in 1866 for Absalom Lowe Landis, a veteran of the Confederate States Army during the American Civil War who served as a member of the Tennessee Senate. It was later acquired by his daughter Melissa and her husband J. M. Shoffner, followed by their granddaughter Argie and her husband William Prentice Cooper, who served as the mayor of Shelbyville, Tennessee. The Coopers also owned the Gov. Prentice Cooper House in Shelbyville, and they summered at Beech Hall. Their son, Prentice Cooper, served as the 39th Governor of Tennessee from 1939 to 1945, and redesigned the cellar in the 1950s. Their grandson, Jim Cooper, serves as a member of the United States House of Representatives.

== Architectural significance ==
The house was designed in the Greek Revival architectural style. It has been listed on the National Register of Historic Places since June 25, 1987.
