= 1938 Tennessee gubernatorial election =

- November 8, 1938
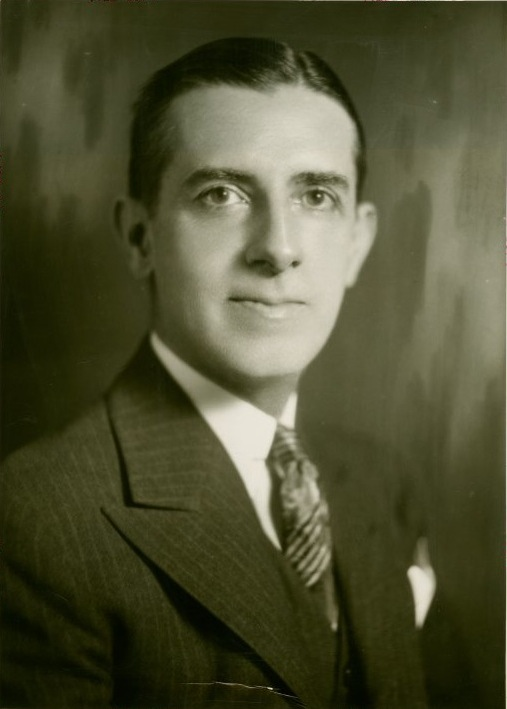

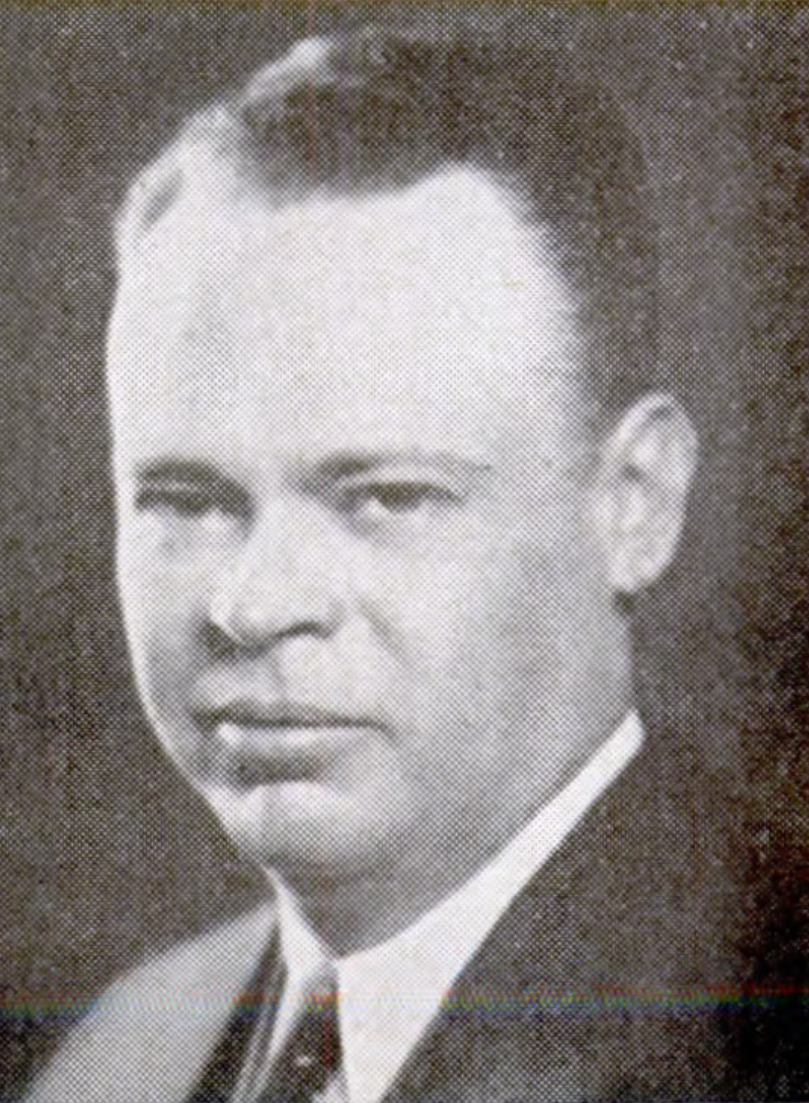
Nominee	Prentice Cooper	Howard Baker Sr.
Party	Democratic	Republican
Popular vote	210,567	83,031
Percentage	71.72%	28.28%
- County results Cooper: 50–60% 60–70% 70–80% 80–90% >90% Baker: 50–60% 60–70% 70–80% 80–90%
Governor before election
Gordon Browning
Democratic
Elected Governor
Prentice Cooper
Democratic

The 1938 Tennessee gubernatorial election was held on November 8, 1938. Incumbent Democratic governor Gordon Browning lost his re-election bid in the primary and was defeated by Democratic nominee Prentice Cooper. In the general election, Cooper defeated Republican nominee Howard Baker Sr. with 71.7% of the vote.

== Background ==
In 1937, Gordon Browning signed the Debt Reorganization Act, which consolidated the state's debt and enacted several new taxes. Over the next decade, these measures reduced the state's debt by roughly 40%. He also created the Department of Conservation (now the Tennessee Department of Environment and Conservation), implemented the state portions of several federal programs aimed at providing Depression-era relief, and established a civil service merit system. Browning was, according to one study, “a progressive Roosevelt supporter during his 1937–39 administration.”

In April 1937, Nathan L. Bachman (who had defeated Browning for the Senate seat in the 1934 special election) died in office. Browning devised a plan that would have allowed him to take Bachman's Senate seat while also helping E. H. Crump defeat Kenneth McKellar for Tennessee's other Senate seat, and enabling Lewis S. Pope to become governor. The plan never materialized, however, as Crump refused to run against his longtime friend McKellar. Furthermore, Browning had angered Crump by appointing several of Luke Lea's–the publisher of the Nashville Tennessean–former associates to government positions while ignoring Crump's own requests for appointments. Browning instead appointed George L. Berry to complete the remainder of Bachman's term.

In 1938, Prentice Cooper, with Crump's endorsement, challenged Browning for the Democratic nomination for governor. After learning that Crump had registered more than 100,000 voters in Shelby County, Browning sought to replace the primary system with a "county unit" system that would equalize votes by county, thereby reducing Shelby County's influence. The bill passed, but was declared unconstitutional by the Tennessee Supreme Court prior to the election. Browning also formed a commission to investigate voter fraud in Shelby County and managed to have more than 13,000 voters removed from the rolls. His efforts fell short, however, and he was defeated by Cooper, 237,853 votes to 158,854.

Following his defeat in the primary, Browning returned to Huntingdon to practice law.

== Primary elections ==
Primary elections were held on August 4, 1938.

=== Democratic primary ===
County results Cooper: 40–50%; 50–60%; 60–70%; 70–80%; 80–90%; Browning: 40–50%; 50–60%; 60–70%; 70–80%

==== Candidates ====
- Prentice Cooper, State Senator from Shelbyville
- Gordon Browning, incumbent governor
- Roy Wallace
- J. Bailey Wray

==== Results ====
Democratic primary results
Party	Candidate	Votes	%
Democratic	Prentice Cooper	237,853	59.45%
Democratic	Gordon Browning (incumbent)	158,854	39.70%
Democratic	Roy Wallace	2,385	0.60%
Democratic	J. Bailey Wray	1,012	0.25%
Total votes		400,104	100.00%

== General election ==
=== Candidates ===
- Prentice Cooper, Democratic
- Howard Baker Sr., Republican

=== Results ===
1938 Tennessee gubernatorial election
Party	Candidate	Votes	%	±%
Democratic	Prentice Cooper	210,567	71.72%	
Republican	Howard Baker Sr.	83,031	28.28%	
Majority		127,536		
Turnout				
Democratic hold		Swing		

== See also ==
- 1938 United States Senate special election in Tennessee
