= William Prentice Cooper =

US lawyer and politician

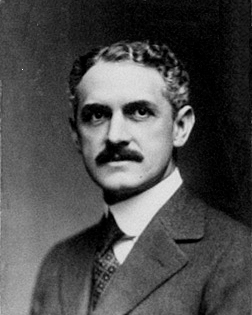
- Official portrait, 1915

59th Speaker of the Tennessee House of Representatives
- In office January 4, 1915 – January 1, 1917
- Preceded by: William M. Stanton
- Succeeded by: Clyde Shropshire

Member of the Tennessee House of Representatives from the 16th district
- In office January 4, 1915 – January 1, 1917
- Preceded by: A. A. Stone
- Succeeded by: J. R. Hart

Mayor of Shelbyville
- In office 1905–1907
- Preceded by: Ernest Coldwell
- Succeeded by: T. O. Tune

Personal details
- Born: William Prentice Cooper; September 27, 1870 Smith Mills, Kentucky, U.S.
- Died: July 3, 1961 (aged 90) Nashville, Tennessee, U.S.
- Resting place: Jenkins Chapel Cemetery
- Party: Democratic
- Spouse: Argentine Shofner (m. 1894; died 1954)
- Children: Prentice
- Relatives: Jim Cooper (grandson); John Cooper (grandson)
- Education: Vanderbilt University (LLB)
- Occupation: Lawyer; banker; politician

William Prentice Cooper (September 27, 1870 – July 3, 1961) was an American lawyer and politician. He served as the Speaker of the Tennessee House of Representatives.

== Early life ==
William Prentice Cooper was born on September 27, 1870. He graduated from Vanderbilt University in 1890, where he was a member of Sigma Alpha Epsilon.

== Career ==
Cooper was a lawyer. He served as the mayor of Shelbyville, Tennessee from 1905 to 1907. He also served as the Speaker of the Tennessee House of Representatives from 1915 to 1917.

Cooper served on the board of trustees of the University of Tennessee from 1915 to 1958.

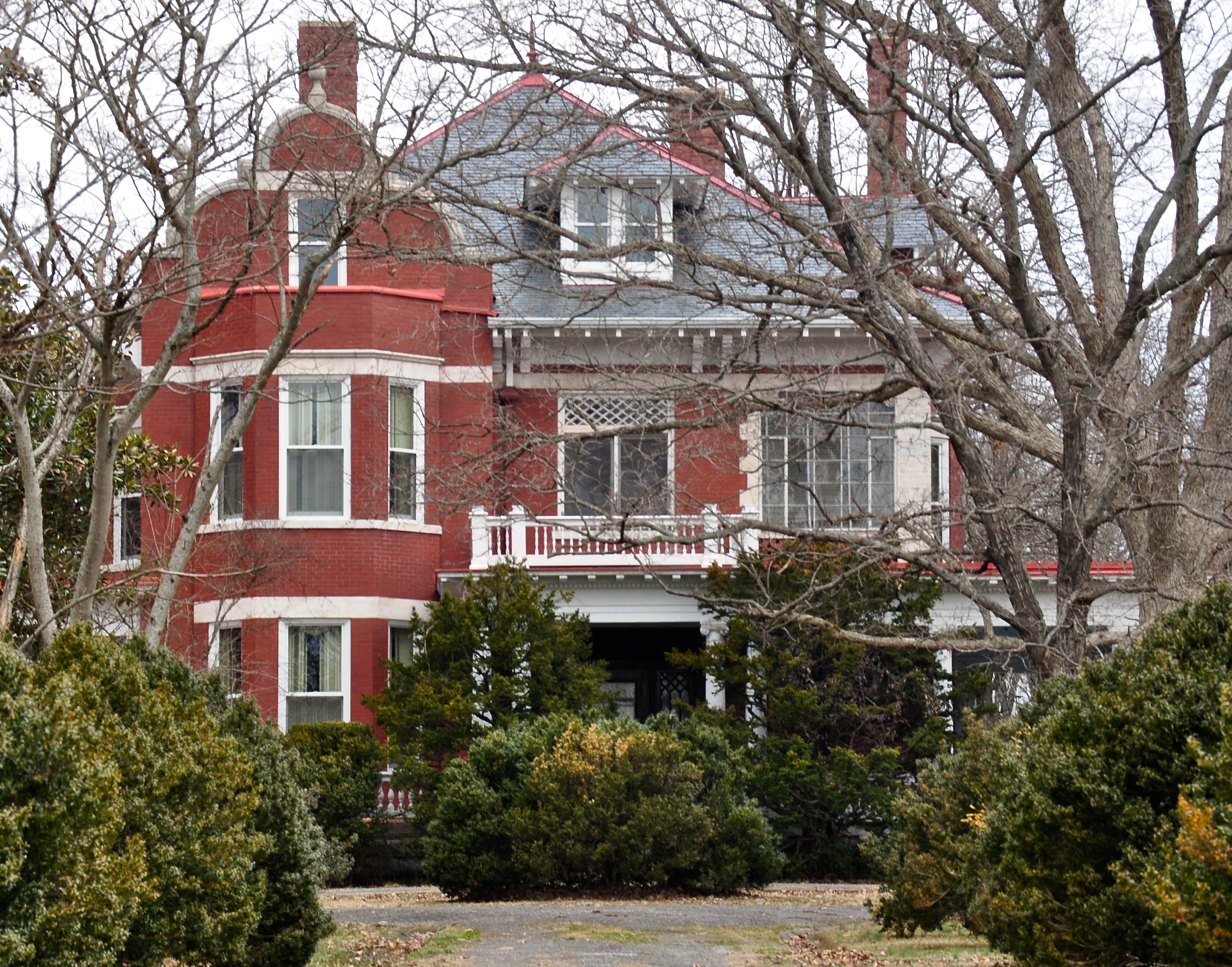
The Cooper home in Shelbyville.

== Personal life ==
Cooper married Argentine Shofner. Their son, Prentice Cooper, served as the 39th Governor of Tennessee from 1939 to 1945. They resided at the Gov. Prentice Cooper House in Shelbyville, built in 1904 for them, and based on the design of a house he owned in Henderson, Kentucky. His wife inherited the Absalom Lowe Landis House, also known as Beech Hall, in Normandy, Tennessee, where the Coopers summered.

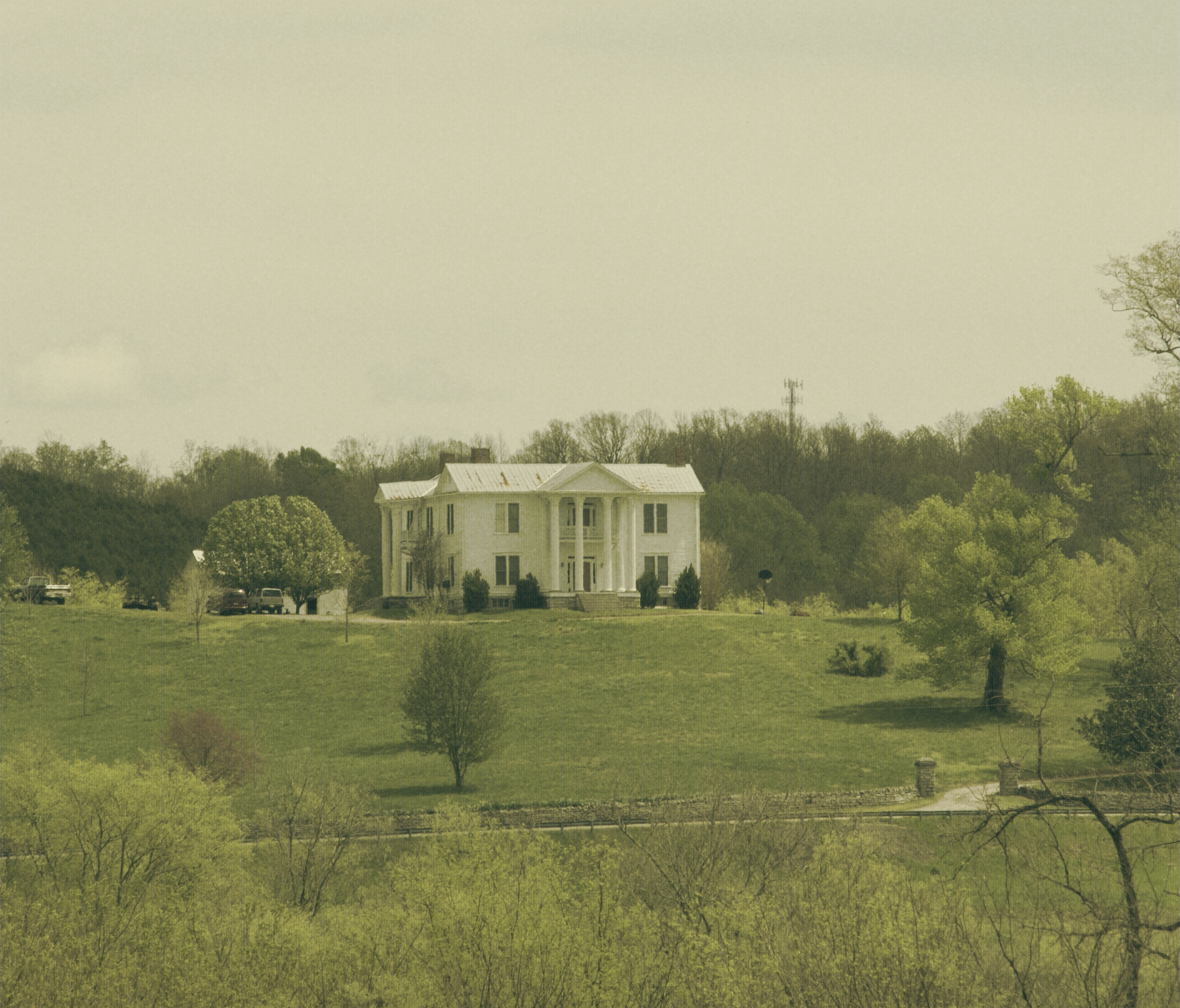
Beech Hall.

== Death and legacy ==
Cooper died on July 3, 1961. His grandson, Jim Cooper, was a member of the United States House of Representatives who retired from his seat in 2022.
