= Jim Cooper =

American politician (born 1954)

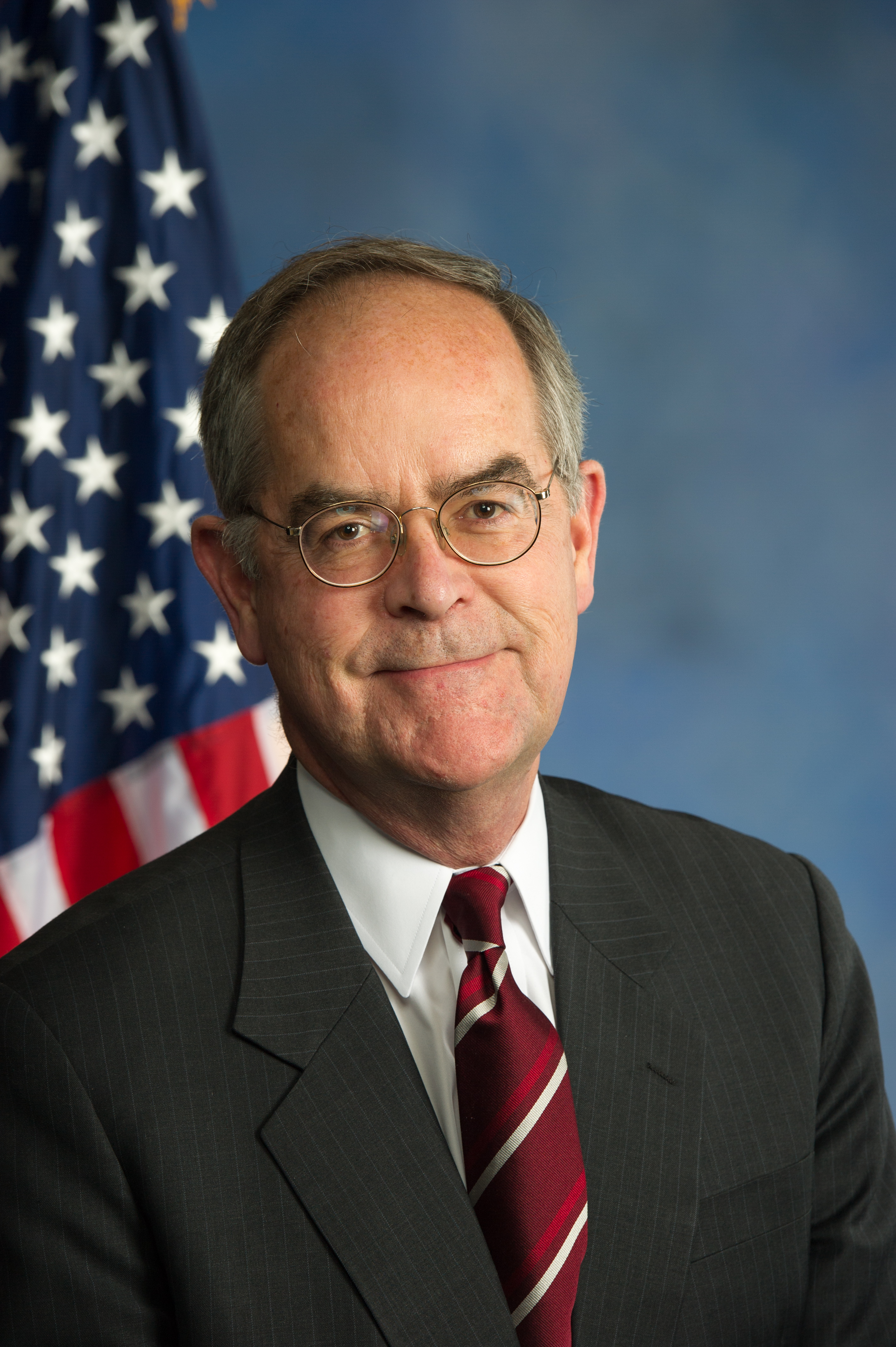
- Official portrait, 2013

Member of the U.S. House of Representatives from Tennessee
- In office January 3, 2003 – January 3, 2023
- Preceded by: Bob Clement
- Succeeded by: Andy Ogles
- Constituency: 5th district
- In office January 3, 1983 – January 3, 1995
- Preceded by: Al Gore (redistricted)
- Succeeded by: Van Hilleary
- Constituency: 4th district

Personal details
- Born: James Hayes Shofner Cooper; June 19, 1954 (age 72) Nashville, Tennessee, U.S.
- Party: Democratic
- Spouses: Martha Hayes (m. 1985; died 2021); Mary Falls (m. 2022)
- Children: 3
- Relatives: Prentice Cooper (father); John Cooper (brother)
- Education: University of North Carolina, Chapel Hill (BA); Oriel College, Oxford (MA); Harvard University (JD)
- Cooper's voice Cooper supporting the FY2019 National Defense Authorization Act. Recorded July 26, 2018

James Hayes Shofner Cooper (born June 19, 1954) is an American lawyer, businessman, professor, and politician who served as the U.S. representative for Tennessee's 5th congressional district (based in Nashville and containing parts of Davidson, Cheatham, and Dickson Counties) from 2003 to 2023. He is a Southern Democrat and was a member of the Blue Dog Coalition, and represented Tennessee's 4th congressional district from 1983 to 1995. His district included all of Nashville. He chaired the United States House Armed Services Subcommittee on Strategic Forces of the House Armed Services Committee, and sat on the Committee on Oversight and Reform, United States House Committee on the Budget, and the House Permanent Select Committee on Intelligence, more committees than any other member of Congress. At the end of his tenure, he was also the dean of Tennessee's congressional delegation. Cooper is the third-longest serving member of Congress ever from Tennessee, after Jimmy Quillen and B. Carroll Reece.

Due to Cooper's rare split tenure in Congress in two entirely different districts, his career was divided in two fields: regulatory and health care legislation in the rural 4th district and military affairs in the urban 5th.

Cooper built seniority and respect on two different sets of committees, becoming what The New York Times op-ed writer Joe Nocera called "the conscience of the House, a lonely voice for civility in this ugly era."

Cooper announced that he would not seek reelection in 2022 after accusing Tennessee's Republican-led state legislature of partisan gerrymandering in the redistricting cycle. The new congressional map, which split Davidson County into 3 separate districts, turned TN-5 from a Democratic-leaning seat into a Republican one. Cooper was succeeded by Republican Andy Ogles.

== Early life, education, and legal career ==
Cooper was born in Nashville and raised in Shelbyville, Tennessee. He is the son of former governor Prentice Cooper and his wife Hortense (Powell). His paternal grandfather, William Prentice Cooper, served as mayor of Shelbyville and speaker of the Tennessee House of Representatives. The Cooper family owns the River Side Farmhouse, built for his great-great-grandfather, Jacob Morton Shofner, in 1890; the Gov. Prentice Cooper House, built for his grandfather in 1904; and the 1866 Absalom Lowe Landis House in Normandy, Tennessee, all of which are listed on the National Register of Historic Places.

Cooper attended the Episcopal boys' boarding school Groton School in Groton, Massachusetts, and the University of North Carolina at Chapel Hill, where he was a member of the Alpha Sigma chapter of the Chi Psi fraternity, received the Morehead-Cain Scholarship, and earned a B.A. in history with highest honors and honors in economics in three years. He was awarded a Rhodes Scholarship to study at Oxford, where he was a member of Oriel College and earned a B.A./M.A. in philosophy, politics and economics in 1977. In 1980, he received a J.D. from Harvard Law School.

Cooper spent two years working for the law firm Waller Lansden Dortch & Davis, LLP in Nashville, and then ran for Congress in 1982.

== U.S. House of Representatives (1983–1995) ==
=== Elections ===
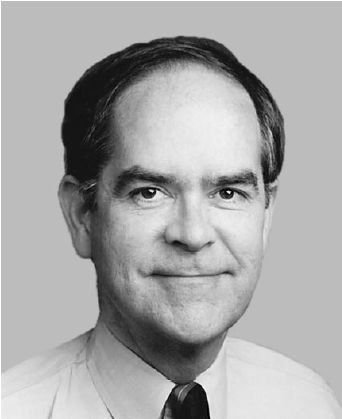
Cooper during the 108th Congress

==== 1982 ====
In 1982, Cooper won the Democratic primary for the 4th district, which had been created when Tennessee gained a district after the 1980 census. The new 4th ran diagonally across the state, from heavily Republican areas near the Tri-Cities, Knoxville and Chattanooga to the fringes of the Nashville suburbs. The district stretched across five media markets – the Tri-Cities (Kingsport, Johnson City, and Bristol), Knoxville, Chattanooga, Nashville and Huntsville, Alabama. The district touched four states – Virginia, Kentucky, Alabama, and Mississippi – and nearly touched North Carolina and Georgia.

Cooper defeated Cissy Baker, an editor in Washington for CNN and the daughter of U.S. Senate Majority Leader Howard Baker, with 66% of the vote, becoming the youngest member of Congress at age 28.

Cooper was reelected five more times with little substantive opposition, running unopposed in 1986 and 1988. Before Cooper's election, much of the eastern portion of the 4th had not been represented by a Democrat since the Civil War. However, the district's size and lack of unifying influences worked to his advantage.

=== Tenure ===
In 1992, Cooper co-authored a bipartisan health-care reform plan that did not include employer mandates compelling universal coverage. Called "Clinton-Lite", this initiative was strongly opposed by Hillary Clinton despite its strong backing from both parties.

In 1990, Cooper was one of only three House Democrats to vote against the Americans with Disabilities Act of 1990.

=== Committee assignments ===
During Cooper's first period in Congress, he served first on the Financial Services Committee and then on the Committee on Energy and Commerce.

With Representative Fred Grandy and Senator John Breaux, Cooper coauthored the Cooper-Breaux bipartisan health reform plan, which dramatically increased health insurance coverage with the support of the business community.

Cooper became the leading expert on rural electrical cooperatives, later authoring "Electric Co-operatives: From New Deal to Bad Deal?" in the Harvard Journal on Legislation.

== 1994 U.S. Senate election ==
Due to the 4th's size, Cooper became a statewide political figure, and was thus positioned to run for Senate in 1994. Cooper ran for the seat vacated by Al Gore's election to the Vice Presidency in 1992, but lost to Republican attorney and actor Fred Thompson. Cooper received just under 40% of the vote. He even lost his own district.

Cooper'a loss was part of a bad year overall for Democrats in Tennessee, as Republican Bill Frist won Tennessee's other Senate seat held by Jim Sasser and Don Sundquist was elected governor. The 4th district seat was also won by a Republican, Van Hilleary.

== Inter-congressional years (1995–2003) ==
After losing his Senate bid, Cooper moved to Nashville and became an investment banker at Equitable Securities. Later, he co-founded Brentwood Capital Advisors, a boutique investment bank based in Nashville. He also served as an adjunct professor at Vanderbilt University's Owen Graduate School of Management until 2015.

== U.S. House of Representatives (2003–2023) ==
=== Elections ===
==== 2002 ====
When Thompson opted not to run for reelection to the Senate in 2002, 5th district Congressman Bob Clement (with whom Cooper had served from 1988 to 1995) ran for Thompson's seat. Cooper entered the 5th district Democratic primary along with several other candidates, including Davidson County Sheriff Gayle Ray, Tennessee's first female sheriff, and state legislator John Arriola. Cooper won the primary with 47% of the vote. He won the general election against Republican nominee Robert Duvall (not the actor Robert Duvall), 64%-33%.

The 5th, based in heavily Democratic Nashville, has long been one of the South's most Democratic districts. It and its predecessors had been in Democratic hands without interruption since 1875, and no Republican had made a serious bid for it since 1972. Upon his return to Congress, the Democrats gave him back his seniority.

==== 2010 ====
Cooper defeated Republican nominee David Hall, 57%–42%. This is his smallest margin of victory during his time representing the 5th district.

==== 2012 ====
Republicans gained complete control of state government for the first time since Reconstruction. This led to speculation that the legislature might try to draw the 5th out from under Cooper in an effort to gain another Republican district. In the summer of 2011, Cooper and Nashville Mayor Karl Dean told The Tennessean that they had heard rumors that Nashville would be split among three Republican districts. Despite its size, Nashville has been entirely or mostly in a single district since Reconstruction. Cooper said he had seen a map that would have put his Nashville home in the heavily Republican 6th district. The 5th would have been reconfigured into a strongly Republican district stretching from Murfreesboro to the Alabama border, while the rest of Nashville would have been placed in the heavily Republican 7th district. Had it been implemented, the map would have left Cooper with only two realistic places to run—an incumbent-versus-incumbent challenge in the 6th against freshman Republican Diane Black, or the reconfigured 5th, which had reportedly been drawn for State Senator and Murfreesboro resident Bill Ketron, chairman of the redistricting committee. But the final map was far less ambitious, and made the 5th slightly more Democratic than its predecessor. Notably, Cooper picked up all of Nashville; previously, a sliver of southwestern Nashville had been in the 7th.

Cooper defeated Republican nominee Brad Staats, 65%–33%.

==== 2020 ====
Cooper was challenged in the Democratic primary by public defender Keeda Haynes, Justin Jones, and former Republican Joshua Rawlings, though Jones withdrew before the primary. Haynes was endorsed by state senator Brenda Gilmore and 2020 Democratic presidential candidate Marianne Williamson, among others. Cooper defeated Haynes and Rawlings with 57% of the vote to Haynes's 40% and Rawlings's 3%.

In the general election, Cooper did not face a Republican nominee. He received 99.99% of the vote, with 14 votes going to write-in candidates.

=== The Golden Goose Award ===
In 2012, Cooper created the Golden Goose Award to recognize the human and economic benefits of federally funded research. Each year, the award is given to scientists to highlight examples of seemingly obscure studies that have led to major breakthroughs and resulted in significant societal impact. Cooper's inspiration for the award came from his desire to reverse the legacy of former Senator William Proxmire's "Golden Fleece Award", which attacked federal spending he saw as wasteful, often federally funded scientific research. Cooper, known as "Father Goose", was honored at the 2022 Golden Goose Award Ceremony.

=== Retirement ===
On January 25, 2022, Cooper announced he would not run for reelection and would retire from Congress. Cooper made the decision due to the state legislature's controversial move to split Davidson County into three congressional districts in an attempt to gerrymander another Republican district.

The final map pushed the 5th into portions of heavily Republican counties to the east and south. Joe Biden easily won the old 5th with 60% of the vote, but Donald Trump would have carried the new 5th with 55%. At the same time, parts of Nashville were drawn into the heavily Republican 6th and 7th districts. Cooper's only options would have been running in the new 5th, which would have been almost two-thirds new to him, or challenging Republican incumbents John Rose in the 6th (which included the western portion of the area he had represented during his first congressional stint) or Mark Green in the 7th. Believing he had no realistic chance of staying in Congress, Cooper opted to retire.

=== Tenure ===
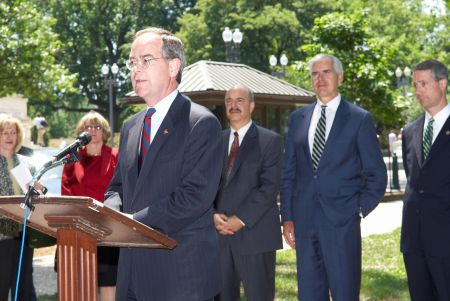
Cooper speaks at conference outside the U.S. Capitol

Cooper was a member of the Blue Dog Coalition and the New Democrat Coalition, and he had a generally moderate voting record. He also served on the Oversight and Government Reform Committee. Despite the different policy affiliation, he became one of Barack Obama's earliest Congressional endorsers. Cooper opposed an $819 billion economic stimulus plan that passed the House in 2009, but ended up voting for the revised $787 billion final package. He is one of only a few Blue Dog members not to seek earmarks. Cooper voted for the Patient Protection and Affordable Care Act in March 2010.

In 2006, Cooper persuaded Nelson Current publishers to issue The Financial Report of the United States: The Official Report the White House Does Not Want You to Read, for which he wrote the introduction.

In 2009 the Wall Street Journal wrote of Cooper's concerns about the national deficit, "It's even worse than most people think, he says, because of dodgy accounting used by the federal government. ... 'The U.S. government uses cash accounting,' he says. 'That is illegal for any enterprise of any size in America except for the U.S. government.'" He made similar remarks on PBS, saying, "The real deficit in America is at least twice as large as any politician will tell you. And it may be ten times larger."

In 2011, Cooper was one of five Democrats to vote for the Cut, Cap, and Balance Act, and co-sponsored the Stop Online Piracy Act.

In 2012, Cooper authored the No Budget, No Pay Act, which specified that members of Congress would not be paid unless they passed a budget by October 1, 2012. It became law in modified form in 2015. Also in 2012, Cooper and Representative Steve LaTourette forced the only congressional vote on the Simpson-Bowles deficit reduction package.

Cooper created the Golden Goose Award to honor the benefits of government-funded scientific research with an annual award ceremony at the Library of Congress. The award is intended to boost the morale of researchers who are often ridiculed by politicians for their work.

In January 2013, Cooper was the only Democrat in the House to vote against an emergency bill to provide additional disaster and recovery funds in the wake of Hurricane Sandy after supporting the initial $30 billion in relief.

In previous cycles, Cooper consistently voted for someone other than Nancy Pelosi for speaker. He cast his vote for Heath Shuler in 2011, Colin Powell in 2013, January 2015 and October 2015, and for Tim Ryan in 2017. He voted present in 2019. In 2021, Cooper broke his streak and voted for Pelosi.

In 2017, Cooper worked with Republican Representative Mike Rogers of Alabama on a proposal to establish a Space Corps under the Department of the Air Force. This proposal passed in the House and then failed in the Senate. Two years later, a bill with very similar language was signed into law, creating the United States Space Force.

On December 18, 2019, Cooper voted for both articles of impeachment against President Donald J. Trump.

On January 13, 2021, Cooper voted for the second impeachment of Donald Trump.

In January 2022, when the board of trustees of McMinn County Schools in Tennessee, in a 10-0 decision, removed the Pulitzer Prize-winning Holocaust graphic novel Maus from its curriculum for 8th grade English classes, overriding a State curriculum decision, Cooper was critical of the decision. He called the ban "outrageous" and "really shameful".

Cooper served on the Strategic Forces Subcommittee and was one of the top Democrats in charge of both nuclear weapons and military satellites for many years. Although most of the work was classified, he wrote an article for War on the Rocks titled "Updating Space Doctrine: How to Avoid World War III", which advocated for the weaponization of space as a deterrence. Cooper was one of few Democrats who supported the Space Development Agency, to build space-based deterrence. He and his Republican counterpart, Doug Lamborn, also wrote "Let's Correct a Misperception about Nuclear Modernization" for Defense One.

Criticism of Congress

In 2009, Cooper and his aide Russell Rumbaugh authored an article titled "Real Acquisition Reform", which was printed in Joint Forces Quarterly.

Cooper spoke with Harvard Law School professor Lawrence Lessig about reforming Congress. According to Lessig, Cooper said that members of Congress are so preoccupied with the question of what they will do after leaving Congress–the most obvious career path being lobbying–that they fall into the habit of thinking about how to serve special interests rather than how to serve the public. According to Lessig, Cooper called Congress a "Farm League for K Street". The Boston Review reprinted Cooper's Harvard lecture on "Fixing Congress."

In 2011, Cooper said, "Working in this Congress is deeply frustrating; in fact, it's enraging. My colleagues are misbehaving. They're posturing for voters back home. They're taking the cheap political hit instead of studying the problem that's before us." The same year, he "called the partisan posturing over the debt ceiling 'an extremely dangerous game of chicken,' and said he'd 'never seen politicians act more irresponsibly than they have been recently,' over the nation's debt."

Cooper was ranked the 20th most bipartisan member of the House during the 114th United States Congress (and the most bipartisan member of the U.S. House of Representatives from Tennessee) in the Lugar Center and McCourt School of Public Policy's Bipartisan Index, which ranks members of Congress by bipartisanship (by measuring how often each member's bills attract co-sponsors from the opposite party and each member's co-sponsorship of bills by members of the opposite party).

In 2022, Cooper was one of 16 Democrats to vote against the Merger Filing Fee Modernization Act of 2022, an antitrust package that would crack down on corporations for anti-competitive behavior.

=== Committee assignments ===
- United States House Committee on Armed Services
  - Subcommittee on Intelligence, Emerging Threats & Capabilities
  - Subcommittee on Seapower & Projection Forces
  - Subcommittee on Strategic Forces (Chair)
- United States House Committee on Oversight and Reform
  - Subcommittee on Environment
- United States House Committee on the Budget
- Permanent Select Committee on Intelligence

=== Caucus memberships ===
- Blue Dog Coalition
- New Democrat Coalition
- Congressional Skin Cancer Caucus (Co-Chair)
- Congressional Wire Products Caucus (Co-Chair)
- Fix Congress Now Caucus (Co-Chair)
- 21st Century Healthcare Caucus
- Bipartisan Disabilities Caucus/Disabilities Advisory Caucus
- Congressional Arts Caucus
- Congressional HBCU Caucus
- Kurdish American Caucus
- National Guard and Reserve Components Caucus
- Servicewomen and Women Veterans Congressional Caucus
- Bipartisan Task Force Combating Anti-Semitism
- Gun Violence Prevention Task Force

== Post-government career ==
As of 2024, Cooper serves on the advisory board of the National Security Space Association.

== Personal life ==
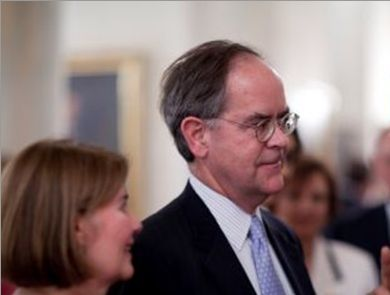
Cooper with his wife Martha

Cooper was married to Martha Bryan Hays, an ornithologist, from 1985 until her death from Alzheimer's disease in 2021 at age 66. They had three children. His daughter Mary was the student body president at the University of North Carolina at Chapel Hill. Cooper's son Jamie graduated from the University of Georgia, and his son Hayes graduated from the University of North Carolina at Chapel Hill and is completing his M.F.A. in poetry at Vanderbilt University.

Cooper's brother John served as mayor of Nashville from 2019 to 2023 and formerly served on the Metropolitan Council of Nashville and Davidson County.

Cooper married Mary Beltz Falls in March 2022.

Cooper is an Episcopalian.

== Electoral history ==
Election results
Year	Office	Subject	Party	Votes	%	Opponent	Party	Votes	%												
1982	U.S. Representative	Jim Cooper	Democratic	93,453	66.1	Cissy Baker	Republican	47,865	33.9%												
1984	U.S. Representative	Jim Cooper	Democratic	93,848	75.2%	James Beau Seigneur	Republican	31,011	24.8%												
1986	U.S. Representative	Jim Cooper	Democratic	86,997	100.0%																
1988	U.S. Representative	Jim Cooper	Democratic	94,129	100.0%																
1990	U.S. Representative	Jim Cooper	Democratic	52,101	67.4%	Claiborne Sanders	Republican	26,424	29.6%	Gene M. Bullington	Independent	3,793	3.0%								
1992	U.S. Representative	Jim Cooper	Democratic	98,984	64.6%	James Beau Seigneur	Republican	50,340	32.9%	Ginnia C. Fox	Independent	3,970	2.5%	Kieven Parks	Independent	1,210	1.0%				
1994	U.S. Senator	Jim Cooper	Democratic	565,930	38.6%	Fred Thompson	Republican	885,998	60.4%												
2002	U.S. Representative	Jim Cooper	Democratic	108,903	63.7%	Robert Duvall	Republican	56,825	33.3%	John Jay Hooker	Independent	3,063	1.8%	Jonathan Farley	Independent	1,205	1.0%	Jesse Turner	Independent	877	1.0%
2004	U.S. Representative	Jim Cooper	Democratic	168,970	69.3%	Scott Knapp	Republican	74,978	30.7%												
2006	U.S. Representative	Jim Cooper	Democratic	122,919	68.9%	Tom Kovach	Republican	49,702	28.0%	Virginia Welsch	Independent	3,766	2.1%	Scott Knapp	Independent	1,755	1.0%				
2008	U.S. Representative	Jim Cooper	Democratic	181,467	65.9%	Gerard Donovan	Republican	85,471	31.0%	Jon Jackson	Independent	5,464	2.0%	John Miglietta	Green	3,196	1.0%				
2010	U.S. Representative	Jim Cooper	Democratic	99,162	56.2%	David Hall	Republican	74,204	42.1%												
2012	U.S. Representative	Jim Cooper	Democratic	171,621	65.2%	Brad Staats	Republican	86,240	32.8%	John Miglietta	Green	5,222	2.0%								
2014	U.S. Representative	Jim Cooper	Democratic	96,148	62.3%	Bob Ries	Republican	55,078	35.3%	Paul Deakin	Independent	3,050	6.4%								
2016	U.S. Representative	Jim Cooper	Democratic	171,111	62.6%	Stacy Ries Snyder	Republican	102,433	37.4%												
2018	U.S. Representative	Jim Cooper	Democratic	177,923	67.8%	Jody Ball	Republican	84,317	32.2%												
2020	U.S. Representative	Jim Cooper	Democratic	50,752	57.1%	Keeda Haynes	Democratic	35,472	39.9	Joshua Rawlings	Democratic	2,681	3.0%								
2020	U.S. Representative	Jim Cooper	Democratic	252,155	100.0%																

U.S. House of Representatives
Preceded by Al Gore	Member of the U.S. House of Representatives from Tennessee's 4th congressional district 1983–1995	Succeeded by Van Hilleary
Preceded by Bob Clement	Member of the U.S. House of Representatives from Tennessee's 5th congressional district 2003–2023	Succeeded by Andy Ogles
Party political offices
Preceded by Al Gore	Democratic nominee for U.S. Senator from Tennessee (Class 2); 1994	Succeeded by Houston Gordon
Preceded by Charles Stenholm	Chair of the Blue Dog Coalition for Policy; 2005–2007; Served alongside: Jim Matheson (Administration), Dennis Cardoza (Communications)	Succeeded by Dennis Moore
Preceded by John Barrow	Chair of the Blue Dog Coalition for Policy; 2013–2017; Served alongside: John Barrow, Kurt Schrader (Administration), Kurt Schrader, Jim Costa (Communications)	Succeeded by Dan Lipinski
U.S. order of precedence (ceremonial)
Preceded by Tom Petri as Former U.S. Representative	Order of precedence of the United States as Former U.S. Representative	Succeeded by Lamar Smith as Former U.S. Representative
