= River Side Farmhouse =

Historic house in Tennessee, United States

- U.S. National Register of Historic Places
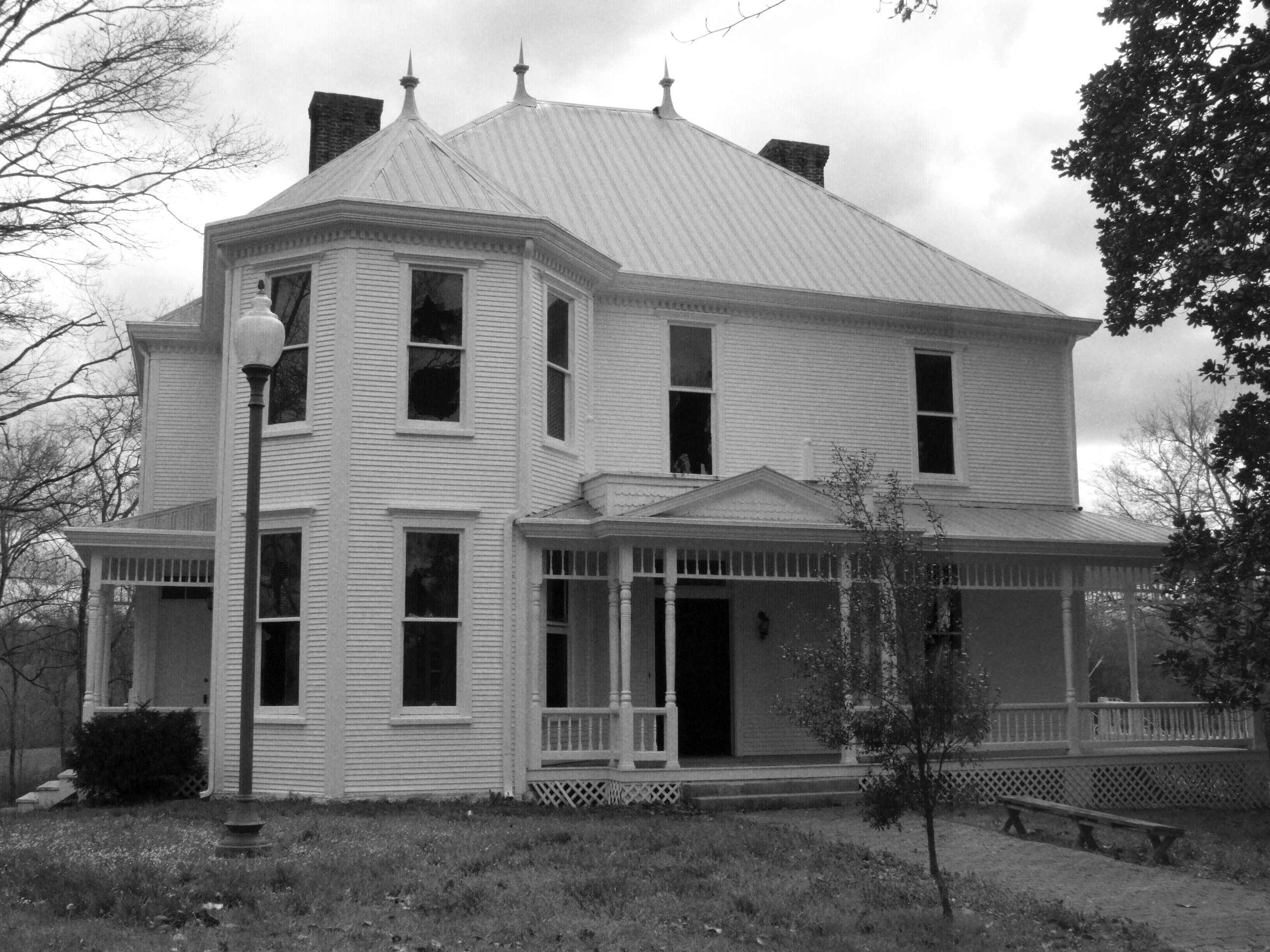
- River Side Farmhouse in 2006

- Location within Tennessee Location within the United States
- Nearest city: Shelbyville, Tennessee
- Coordinates: 35°26′58″N 86°22′53″W
- Area: 4 acres (1.6 ha)
- Built: 1890
- Architectural style: Queen Anne
- NRHP reference No.: 97001501
- Added to NRHP: December 1, 1997

River Side Farmhouse is a historic farmhouse in Shelbyville, Tennessee, U.S..

== History ==
The land was acquired by John Shofner, a settler from North Carolina, in 1815. Shofner built a loghouse, which was later demolished by his son Michael. A new house was built by Michael Shofner, but it was also demolished thereafter. By 1890, Michael's son, Jacob Morton Shofner, built this farmhouse. Jacob's grandson, Prentice Cooper, was born in this house; he went on to serve as the 39th Governor of Tennessee from 1939 to 1945. The house is still owned by the Cooper family, which includes Congressman Jim Cooper and mayor of Nashville John Cooper.

== Architectural significance ==
The house was designed in the Queen Anne architectural style. It has been listed on the National Register of Historic Places since December 1, 1997.
