= Turner Normal and Industrial School =

American private school in Tennessee (1886–1932)

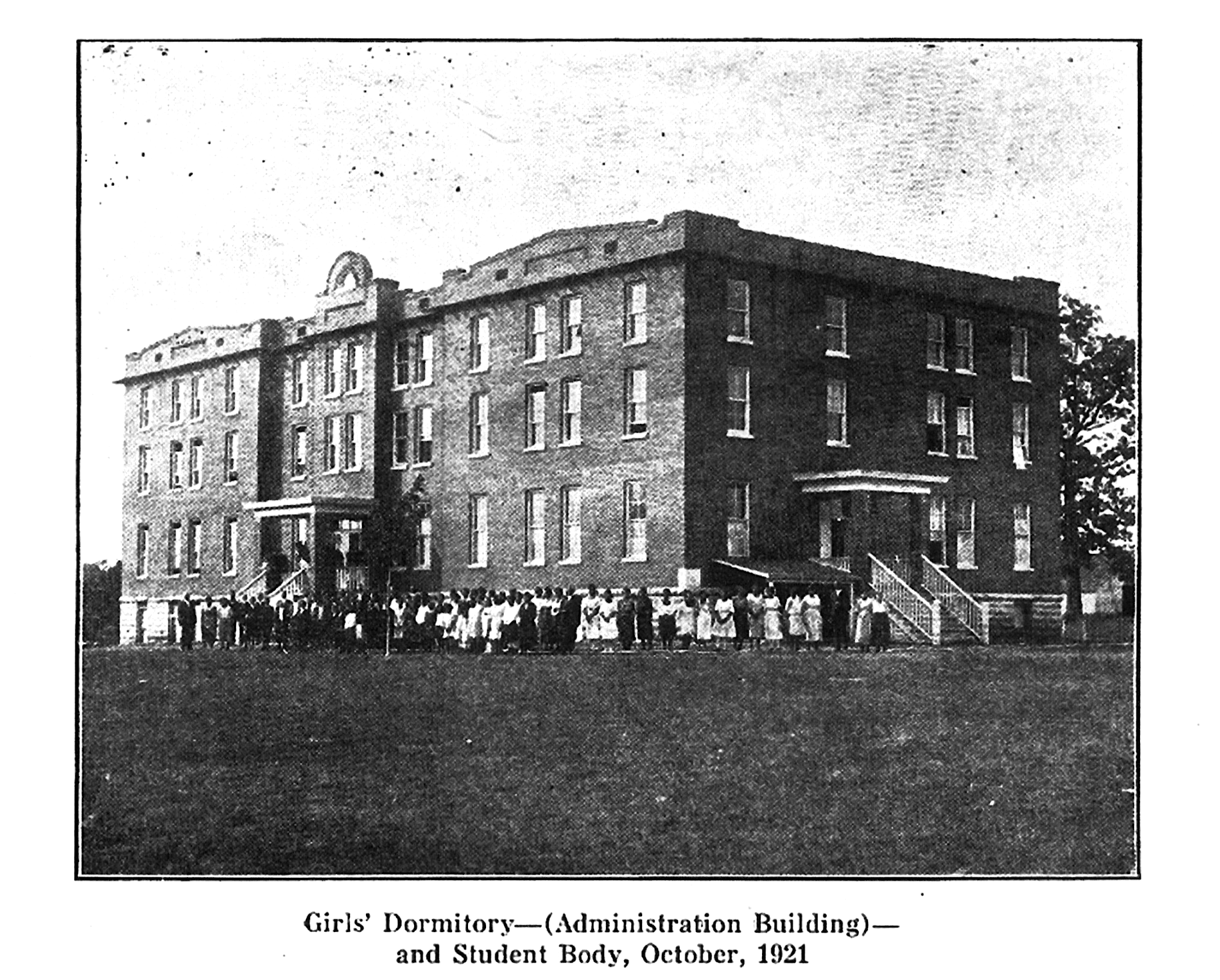
- Turner Industrial School (1921) main building

Location
- Shelbyville, Tennessee; Bedford County; United States; 35.4867°N 86.4711°W

Information
- Other names: Shelbyville High School (1886–), Turner Industrial School, Turner Normal School, Turner Normal and Industrial School (1896–), Turner College (–1932)
- School type: Private Secondary School, Theology School, Industrial School, Normal School, College Prep.
- Religious affiliation: African Methodist Episcopal Church
- Established: 1886
- Closed: 1932

The Turner Normal and Industrial School (1886–1932) was a private school affiliated with the AME Church, for African American students in Shelbyville, Tennessee, United States. It existed initially as a secondary school and school of theology, and later as an industrial school, normal school, and college preparatory school. For the last two years, the school was moved to Memphis, Tennessee. It was also known as the Shelbyville High School, Turner Industrial School, Turner Normal School, and Turner College.

== Pre-history and name ==
At the end of the 19th century, some twenty-seven schools for African American students that existed in Bedford County, Tennessee. Prior to the school opening in Shelbyville, Tennessee, there had been a different school also affiliated with the AME Church and also named Turner College was located in Hernando, Mississippi (near Memphis, Tennessee), which later was merged with Campbell College. These two schools were named after Bishop Henry McNeal Turner, who presided over the 1885 Tennessee Conference for the United Methodist Church.

== History ==
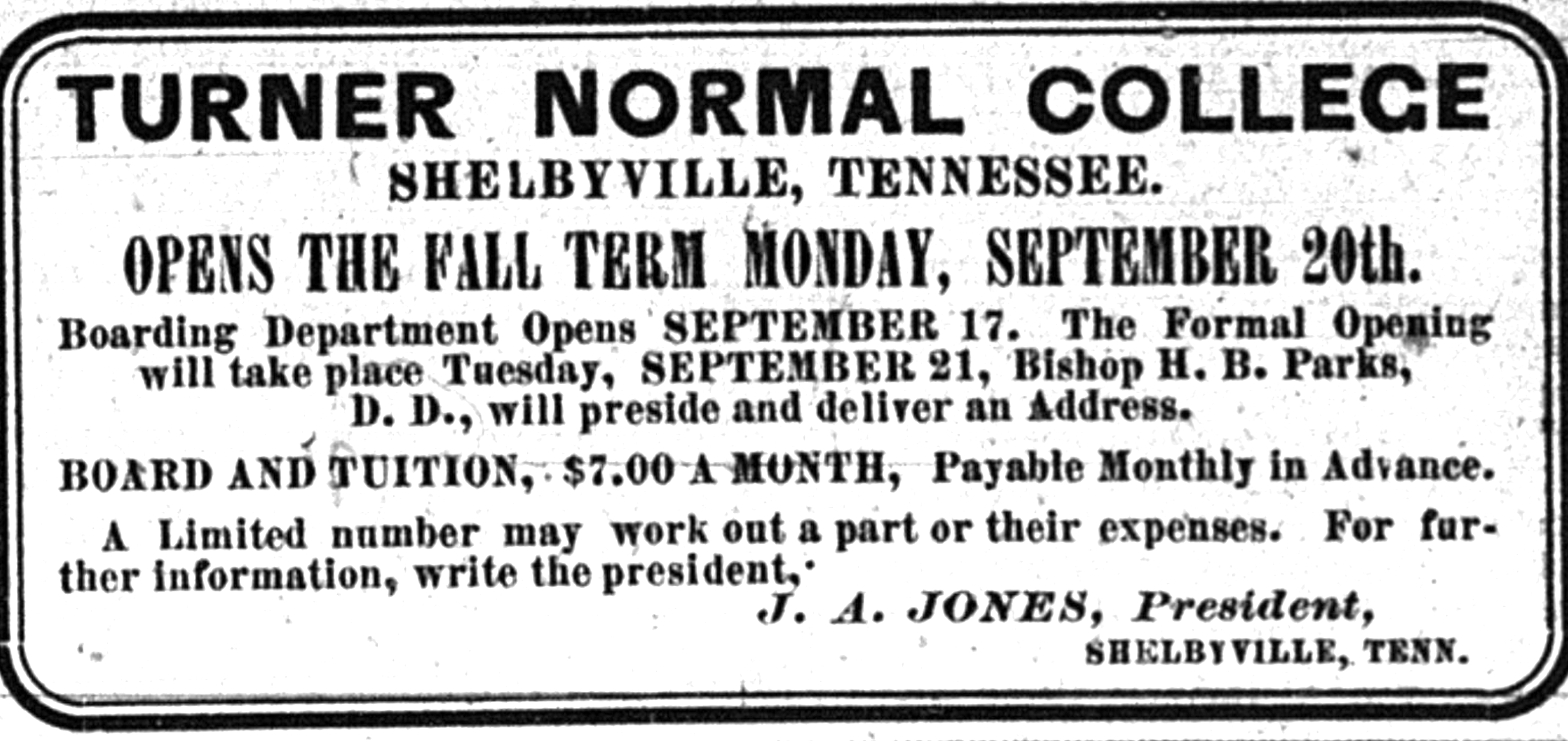
Advertisement (1909) in The Nashville Globe newspaper

The school in Shelbyville, Tennessee was initially established as Shelbyville High School in 1886, and was chartered in 1887. It was founded during a time of school racial segregation due to Jim Crow laws, and it was for African American students. The first principal was Rev. C.S. Bowman, who also pastored the local AME Church. Other presidents included Rev. B.A.J. Nixon, Rev. W.H. Shelby, Rev. C.H. Boone, Rev. J.H. Boone, and Rev. J.A. Jones. The school in the 1910s offered education in theological studies, English, normal (or education), college preparatory, as well as in commercial studies, music, sewing, and millinery.

This school often struggled for funding, and in June 1912 they had called to help from nearby churches including the Baptist Church, and Roger Williams University in Nashville, Tennessee. In 1912, Moses McKissack III (co-founder of the Black-owned architecture firm McKissack & McKissack) designed the three-story main campus building for Turner Normal and Industrial School, which also served as the girl's dormitory and administration building.

The name of the school changed over the years in part to reflect changes to the curricula, and it became Turner Normal, Turner Industrial, Turner Normal and Industrial Institute in 1896, and finally to Turner College. In 1930, the school was moved to Memphis, Tennessee, however it only existed in that city for two years. In 1932 after forty-three years in operations, the trustees announced the closure of what was then Turner College.

== See also ==
- Bedford County Training School for Negroes (1923–1967), a public school for blacks in the same county
- George Washington Carver High School (Brownsville, Tennessee)
