= Ernest A. Pickup =

American printmaker (1887–1970)

- Born: Ernest Alexander Pickup; April 19, 1887; Shelbyville, Tennessee, U.S.
- Died: February 24, 1970 (aged 82); Nashville, Tennessee, U.S.
- Occupation: Printmaker

Ernest Alexander Pickup (April 19, 1887 – February 24, 1970) was an American printmaker.

== Early life ==
Ernest Alexander Pickup was born April 10, 1887, in Shelbyville, Tennessee, the son of George Alexander Pickup and Rebecca Cannon. As a young man he moved with his family to Brooklyn, New York, in 1894, where he attended school before moving to Baltimore, Maryland.

When Ernest completed the fifth grade (age 12), the family moved back to Brooklyn where Ernest was enrolled as an apprentice at the Organ Printing Company along with his father to learn the printing business.

In 1904, the Pickups returned to Tennessee where they established a rubber stamp business, G. A. Pickup and Son.

== Career ==
In 1912, he began a career as a commercial artist, and over the next 18 years built a successful business in Nashville, Tennessee. During the Depression, however, Pickup's business, like most in America, began to suffer.

With time on his hands, Pickup began experimenting with wood engraving in the early 1930s. He studied the work of other artists – primarily Claire Leighton, Rockwell Kent and Thomas Nason and to a lesser extent Thomas Hart Benton and Grant Wood. Leighton's book on wood engraving and woodcuts became his Bible on making woodcuts, but it was Nason's simple architectural themes and pastoral renderings that inspired his subject matter. Pickup and Nason shared a common view of nature and the countryside, and the majority of his prints reflected his love of nature as well as his appreciation for the historical places and the rural area in and around Nashville.

Pickup was one of only a handful of artists in Tennessee who worked with wood engraving. He exhibited nationally throughout the 1930s, and became nationally recognized for his work. In January 1937, his prints were exhibited in the National Exhibition of Lithographs, Woodcuts, and Block Prints New York City, and from that exhibition one of his prints was selected by The Society of American Etchers for a tour of European galleries, beginning in Stockholm, Sweden.

His work was included in the "Sixth International Exhibition of Lithography and Wood Engraving" at the Art Institute of Chicago, November 5, 1937, to January 10, 1938. From that exhibition, his print was chosen as one of the best-100 works for a traveling show throughout America.

With America's entry in World War II there was an increased demand for commercial artwork, and as a result Pickup's printmaking suffered. By the late 1940s, he had returned full-time to his commercial artwork. He remained, however, connected to the arts community well into the 1950s. He still exhibited his work occasionally and gave occasional lectures on woodblock printing to local organizations.

In 1962, at age seventy-five, he closed his business with the intention of retiring. Before he was able to move out of his studio, he was enticed to work another five years for a printing company for which he had done art work for many years. He died February 24, 1970, in Nashville.

His work was included in an exhibition at the Georgia Museum of the University of Georgia, Athens, Georgia, in Summer 2007 and was scheduled for Summer 2008 to be held at the Auburn University Art Museum in Alabama.

Little has been written on print making in Tennessee, and in Fall 2009 a catalogue raisonné of Pickup's oeuvre was published providing a prime source of information on this long p-neglected period of art history. Besides a biographical overview and memoirs by the artist's daughter, this work also includes over fifty reproductions of rare prints, many of which have not been seen in over a half a century.

He was better known to family by the nickname of "Bockie" – the name that his first grandchild, Susan, gave to him when he reached into his pocket for a "surprise". She would run up to him and say "bockie" and reach for his pocket. That name "Bockie" stood for dear grandfather.
