= Bedford County Schools =

School district in Tennessee, United States

Address
- 500 Madison Street Shelbyville, Bedford, Tennessee, 37160; United States
- Coordinates: 35.488001°N 86.453559°W

District information
- Type: Public
- Grades: PreK–12
- Schools: 15
- NCES District ID: 4700180

Students and staff
- Students: 9,042 (2024–25)
- Teachers: 641.14 (on an FTE basis)

Other information
- Website: www.bedfordk12tn.com

Bedford County School District (BCSD) or Bedford County Schools is a school district headquartered in Shelbyville, Tennessee, United States.

== History ==
The first class of African-American students graduated from the district in May 1890. In 1964 African-American students became admitted to schools previously reserved for white children due to the Civil Rights Act of 1964.

== Schools ==
High schools:

- Cascade High School
- Community High School
- Shelbyville Central High School
- Bedford County Virtual High School (currently only 9th and 10th grades)

Middle schools:

- Cascade Middle School
- Community Middle School
- Harris Middle School
- Liberty Middle School
- Bedford County Virtual Middle School

Elementary schools:

- Bedford County Learning Academy
- Cascade Elementary School
- Community Elementary School
- Eakin Elementary School
- East Side Elementary School
- Learning Way Elementary School
- Liberty Elementary School
- Southside Elementary School
- Thomas Magnet School
- Bedford County Virtual Elementary School

The district previously operated East Bedford School and Bedford County Training School for Negroes, the latter previously John McAdams High School and also Harris High School for Negroes. These schools were reserved for black students. In 1967 it merged into Shelbyville Central.

== Demographics ==
In the Jim Crow period, circa 1930s to 1960s, the district had around 700 African-American students.

== Notable alumni ==
- Sondra Locke (1944–2018), actress and film director; graduated from SCHS in 1962 as valedictorian
- Gordon Anderson, widower of Sondra Locke
