= Joyce Paul =

American country music singer (1937–2016)

Joyce Marie Paul (May 3, 1937 – February 15, 2016) was an American country music singer. She is best known for her 1968, #36 hit on the Billboard Hot Country Songs charts, "Phone Call to Mama" from her album Heartaches, Laughter & Tears.

She was born in Shelbyville, Tennessee and raised in Nashville, Tennessee.

Paul's other singles were "Do Right Woman – Do Right Man", "I’ve Loved Him Much Longer Than You", "I'm the Girl on the Billboard". Among her producers were Bob Montgomery and Kelso Herston on United Artists Records.

She died in 2016 in Roseville, Minnesota, at the age of 78.
