= Bedford County Training School for Negroes =

American school in Tennessee (1923–1967)

- Shelbyville, Tennessee; Bedford County; United States

Information
- Other names: Bedford County Training School, John McAdams High School, Harris High School for Negroes
- School type: Public
- Opened: 1923
- Closed: 1967
- School district: Bedford Public Schools

Bedford County Training School for Negroes was a public high school for African-American students in Shelbyville, Tennessee, and was a part of Bedford County Schools. It was notable for their football team, which between 1942 and 1949 had won 52 consecutive shutout football games. It was also known as John McAdams High School and Harris High School for Negroes.

John McAdams High, as the school was initially called when it was founded in 1923, was originally classes until grade 10, but they received grades 11 and 12. From 1935 to 1965, Sidney W. Harris was the principal. Shelbyville Central High School absorbed the students in 1967, as desegregation was initiated after 1964.

== See also ==
- Turner Normal and Industrial School (1886–1932), a private black school in the same county
