= Gov. Prentice Cooper House =

Historic house in Tennessee, United States

- U.S. National Register of Historic Places
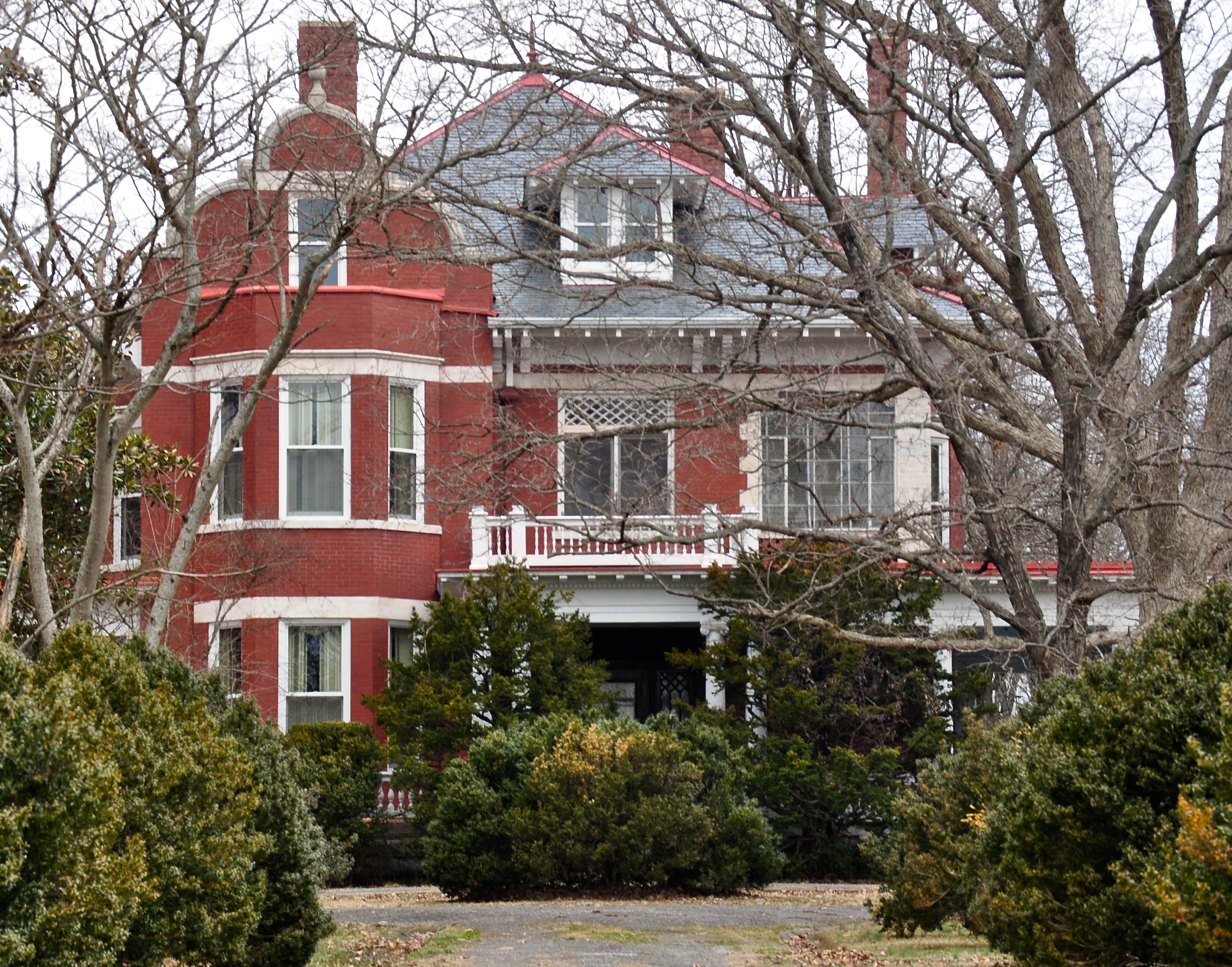

- Location within Tennessee Location within the United States
- Location: 413 East Lane Street, Shelbyville, Tennessee
- Coordinates: 35°29′6″N 86°27′12″W
- Area: 2.5 acres (1.0 ha)
- Built: 1904
- Architectural style: Late Victorian
- NRHP reference No.: 75001729
- Added to NRHP: June 5, 1975

The Gov. Prentice Cooper House is a historic house in Shelbyville, Tennessee, United States.

== History ==
The house was built in 1904 for William Prentice Cooper, based on the design of a house he owned in Henderson, Kentucky. Cooper Sr. served as a member of the Tennessee House of Representatives from 1915 to 1916. His son, Prentice Cooper, served as a member of the Tennessee House of Representatives from 1923 until 1925 and in the Tennessee Senate from 1937 to 1939, and as the Governor of Tennessee from 1939 to 1945; he was appointed as the United States Ambassador to Peru in 1946, and he served in this capacity until 1948. By 1950, Cooper Jr still lived in the house with parents and his wife, although a new guesthouse was built for them by Peruvian builders in 1952. By the 1970s, the house still belonged to the Cooper family, including his son Congressman Jim Cooper.

== Architectural significance ==
The house was designed in the Victorian architectural style. It has been listed on the National Register of Historic Places since June 5, 1975.
