= Shelbyville, Tennessee =

Shelbyville
- City
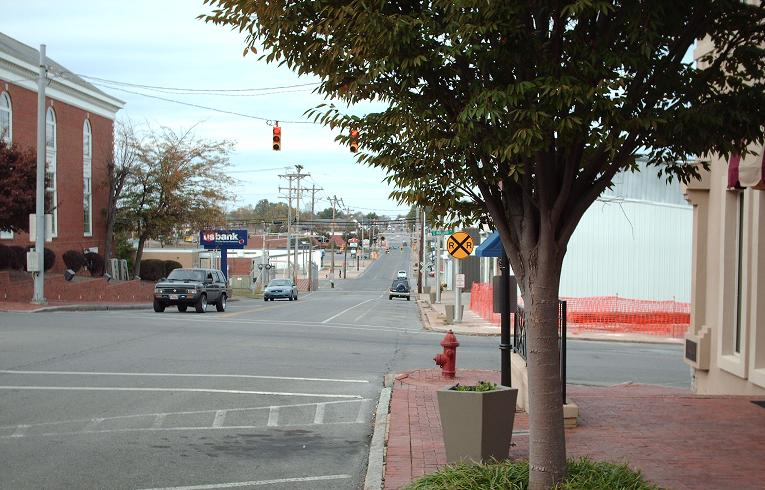
- Downtown Shelbyville
- Nicknames: The Walking Horse Capital of the World and The Pencil City
- Location of Shelbyville in Bedford County, Tennessee.
- Coordinates: 35°29′20″N 86°27′8″W
- Country: United States
- State: Tennessee
- County: Bedford
- Platted: 1810
- Incorporated: 1819
- Named for: Isaac Shelby

Government
  - Mayor: Randy Carroll

Area
  - Total: 18.44 sq mi (47.76 km^{2})
  - Land: 18.44 sq mi (47.76 km^{2})
  - Water: 0 sq mi (0.00 km^{2})
- Elevation: 750 ft (230 m)

Population (2020)
  - Total: 23,557
  - Density: 1,277.6/sq mi (493.27/km^{2})
- Time zone: UTC-6 (Central (CST))
  - Summer (DST): UTC-5 (CDT)
- ZIP codes: 37160-37162
- Area code: 931
- FIPS code: 47-67760
- GNIS feature ID: 1269993
- Website: www.shelbyvilletn.org

Shelbyville is a city in and the seat of government of Bedford County, Tennessee, United States. The city was laid out in 1810 and incorporated in 1819. As of the 2020 census, Shelbyville had a population of 23,557. The city is a hub of the Tennessee Walking Horse industry and has been nicknamed "The Walking Horse Capital of the World".

== Geography ==
Shelbyville is in Middle Tennessee on a Highland Rim limestone bluff upon the banks of Duck River, which flows around the southern and eastern sides of town.

According to the United States Census Bureau, the city has a total area of 18.6 square miles (48.2 km^{2}), all land.

=== Climate ===
Climate data for Shelbyville, Tennessee (1991–2020 normals, extremes 1951–present)
Month	Jan	Feb	Mar	Apr	May	Jun	Jul	Aug	Sep	Oct	Nov	Dec	Year
Record high °F (°C)	78 (26)	82 (28)	85 (29)	92 (33)	96 (36)	108 (42)	107 (42)	105 (41)	105 (41)	98 (37)	87 (31)	77 (25)	108 (42)
Mean maximum °F (°C)	67.5 (19.7)	71.2 (21.8)	78.8 (26.0)	84.1 (28.9)	89.1 (31.7)	94.0 (34.4)	95.9 (35.5)	95.7 (35.4)	93.1 (33.9)	85.7 (29.8)	77.5 (25.3)	69.0 (20.6)	97.5 (36.4)
Mean daily maximum °F (°C)	49.4 (9.7)	53.8 (12.1)	62.5 (16.9)	72.0 (22.2)	79.5 (26.4)	86.4 (30.2)	89.4 (31.9)	89.0 (31.7)	83.9 (28.8)	73.4 (23.0)	61.6 (16.4)	52.4 (11.3)	71.1 (21.7)
Daily mean °F (°C)	39.1 (3.9)	42.7 (5.9)	50.6 (10.3)	59.5 (15.3)	67.8 (19.9)	75.4 (24.1)	78.8 (26.0)	77.8 (25.4)	71.8 (22.1)	60.6 (15.9)	49.3 (9.6)	42.0 (5.6)	59.6 (15.3)
Mean daily minimum °F (°C)	28.9 (−1.7)	31.7 (−0.2)	38.7 (3.7)	47.1 (8.4)	56.2 (13.4)	64.3 (17.9)	68.3 (20.2)	66.6 (19.2)	59.7 (15.4)	47.9 (8.8)	37.1 (2.8)	31.7 (−0.2)	48.2 (9.0)
Mean minimum °F (°C)	9.7 (−12.4)	14.9 (−9.5)	21.3 (−5.9)	30.1 (−1.1)	40.4 (4.7)	52.9 (11.6)	59.4 (15.2)	57.4 (14.1)	44.6 (7.0)	31.6 (−0.2)	21.7 (−5.7)	16.0 (−8.9)	7.7 (−13.5)
Record low °F (°C)	−20 (−29)	−7 (−22)	3 (−16)	21 (−6)	30 (−1)	38 (3)	49 (9)	47 (8)	32 (0)	18 (−8)	9 (−13)	−9 (−23)	−20 (−29)
Average precipitation inches (mm)	5.29 (134)	5.63 (143)	5.79 (147)	4.99 (127)	5.05 (128)	5.03 (128)	5.07 (129)	4.24 (108)	4.22 (107)	3.65 (93)	4.35 (110)	6.05 (154)	59.36 (1,508)
Average snowfall inches (cm)	0.1 (0.25)	0.2 (0.51)	0.7 (1.8)	0.0 (0.0)	0.0 (0.0)	0.0 (0.0)	0.0 (0.0)	0.0 (0.0)	0.0 (0.0)	0.0 (0.0)	0.0 (0.0)	0.1 (0.25)	1.1 (2.8)
Average precipitation days (≥ 0.01 in)	11.6	11.8	12.4	11.1	11.7	11.3	11.3	9.3	7.8	8.4	9.6	12.1	128.4
Average snowy days (≥ 0.1 in)	0.2	0.3	0.3	0.0	0.0	0.0	0.0	0.0	0.0	0.0	0.0	0.2	1.0
Source: NOAA

== Demographics ==
Historical population
Census	Pop.	Note	%±
1850	1,708		—
1860	776		−54.6%
1870	1,719		121.5%
1880	1,869		8.7%
1890	1,823		−2.5%
1900	2,236		22.7%
1910	2,869		28.3%
1920	2,912		1.5%
1930	5,010		72.0%
1940	6,537		30.5%
1950	9,456		44.7%
1960	10,466		10.7%
1970	12,262		17.2%
1980	13,530		10.3%
1990	14,049		3.8%
2000	16,105		14.6%
2010	20,335		26.3%
2020	23,557		15.8%
2025 (est.)	26,146	▲	11.0%

=== 2020 census ===
As of the 2020 census, Shelbyville had a population of 23,557 and 5,025 families. The median age was 33.3 years, 27.9% of residents were under the age of 18, and 12.8% of residents were 65 years of age or older. For every 100 females there were 96.6 males, and for every 100 females age 18 and over there were 94.7 males age 18 and over.

There were 8,293 households in Shelbyville, of which 38.3% had children under the age of 18 living in them. Of all households, 37.6% were married-couple households, 19.7% were households with a male householder and no spouse or partner present, and 33.3% were households with a female householder and no spouse or partner present. About 28.2% of all households were made up of individuals and 12.2% had someone living alone who was 65 years of age or older.

94.7% of residents lived in urban areas, while 5.3% lived in rural areas.

There were 8,896 housing units, of which 6.8% were vacant. The homeowner vacancy rate was 2.0% and the rental vacancy rate was 5.7%.

Racial composition as of the 2020 census
Race	Number	Percent
White	14,286	60.6%
Black or African American	3,005	12.8%
American Indian and Alaska Native	314	1.3%
Asian	176	0.7%
Native Hawaiian and Other Pacific Islander	19	0.1%
Some other race	3,758	16.0%
Two or more races	1,999	8.5%
Hispanic or Latino (of any race)	6,166	26.2%

=== 2000 census ===
As of the census of 2000, there was a population of 16,105, with 6,066 households and 4,155 families residing in the city. The population density was 1,041.3 inhabitants per square mile (402.0/km^{2}). There were 6,550 housing units at an average density of 423.5 per square mile (163.5/km^{2}). The racial makeup of the city was 77.14% White, 14.98% African American, 0.70% Asian, 0.35% Native American, 0.05% Pacific Islander, 5.02% from other races, and 1.78% from two or more races. Hispanic or Latino residents of any race made up 14.55% of the population.

Of the 6,066 households, 31.7% had children under the age of 18 living with them, 46.0% were married couples living together, 16.6% had a female householder with no husband present, and 31.5% were non-families. A total of 26.5% of all households were made up of individuals, and 12.4% had someone living alone who was 65 years of age or older. The average household size was 2.59 and the average family size was 3.05.

In the city, 25.2% of the population was under the age of 18, 11.9% was from 18 to 24, 28.9% from 25 to 44, 18.8% from 45 to 64, and 15.2% was 65 years of age or older. The median age was 34 years. For every 100 females, there were 94.4 males. For every 100 females age 18 and over, there were 91.5 males.

The median income for a household in the city was $27,593, and the median income for a family was $30,465. Males had a median income of $23,754 versus $16,065 for females. The per capita income for the city was $11,260. About 14.4% of families and 25.2% of the population were below the poverty line, including 18.4% of those under age 18 and 22.1% of those age 65 or over.

== Economy ==
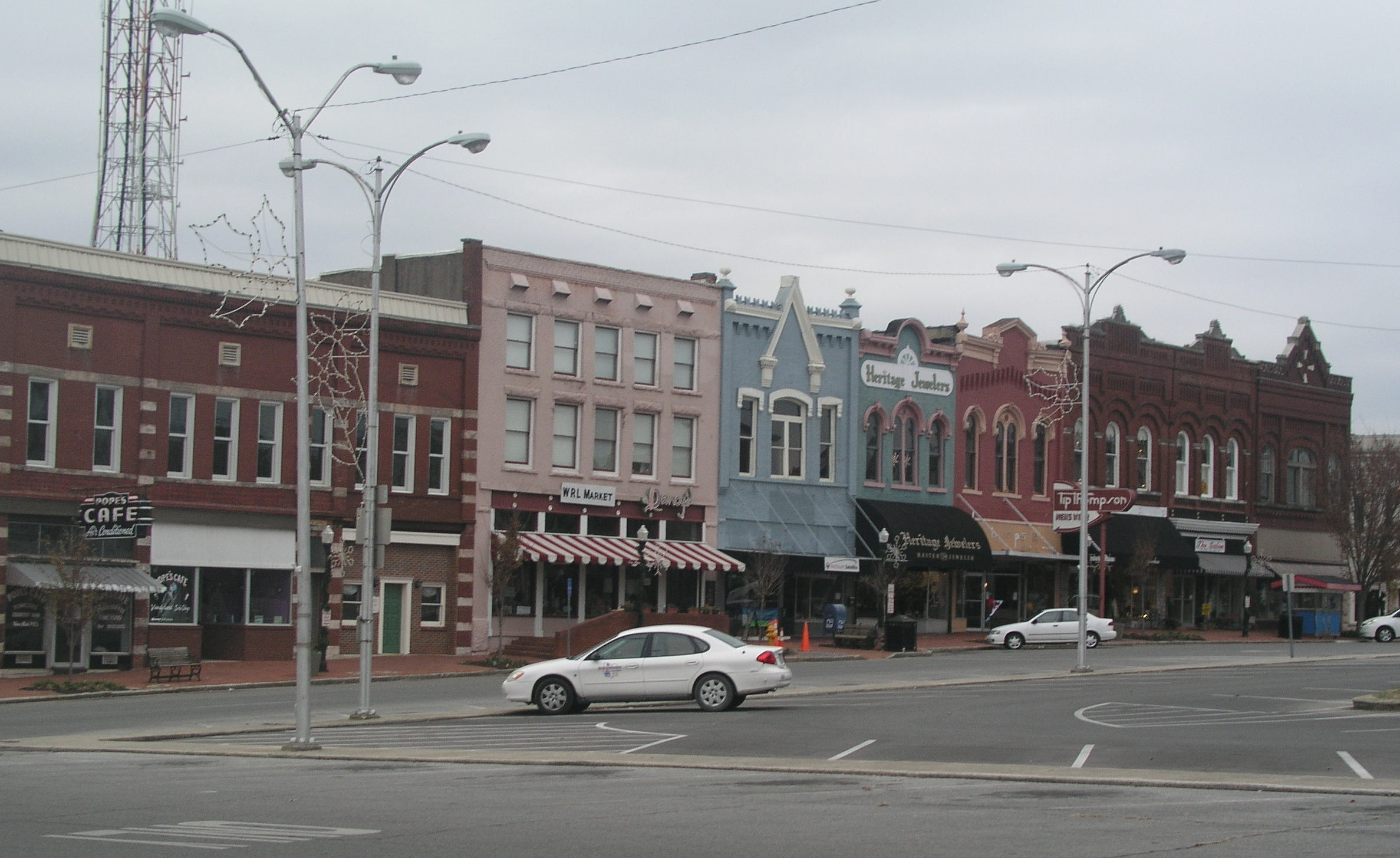
Town Square of Shelbyville

Shelbyville is known as "The Pencil City" because of its historical importance as a center of wood-cased pencil manufacturing. It is still a site for manufacture of writing instruments. In 1982, National Pen Corporation purchased its largest competitor, U.S. Pencil and Stationery Company. Sanford Corporation produced the Sharpie, the world's top-selling writing instrument, in the city. It was in Shelbyville in 1991 that the world's longest pencil was produced, a plastic-cased pencil 1,091 feet (333 m) long, weighing 27 pounds (12 kg).

One of last four pencil manufacturers in the United States, Musgrave Pencil Company, is located in Shelbyville.

Other major business operations in Shelbyville include manufacturers Calsonic Kansei, Newell Rubbermaid, Cebal America, and Jostens; it is also home to a Tyson Foods facility and a distribution center for Wal-Mart, as well as several nationwide trucking businesses.

== Transportation ==
Shelbyville is at the intersection of U.S. Route 231 and U.S. Route 41A. It was the terminus of a branch line (from Wartrace), located along what is now known as Railroad Avenue, connecting with what was once known as the Saint Louis, Nashville and Chattanooga Railroad.

== Tennessee Walking Horse National Celebration ==
The Tennessee Walking Horse National Celebration takes place each year during the 11 days and nights prior to Labor Day. It is the largest show for the Tennessee Walking Horse, during which the breed's World Grand Champion and over 20 World Champions are named. The Celebration is a festival event where more than $650,000 in prizes and awards are given. The Celebration began in 1939, and the first winner was Strolling Jim.

== Education ==
=== K-12 education ===
Bedford County School District operates primary and secondary schools. Shelbyville Central High School is the local public high school.

After the end of non-penal slavery in the United States the AME Church opened a school for African-American children. The public school system graduated its first black class in 1890. The schools for African-American children operated by the district were East Bedford School and Bedford County Training School for Negroes (a.k.a. John McAdams High School and also Harris High School for Negroes). Schools racially integrated after 1964.

=== Higher education ===
The Tennessee College of Applied Technology - Shelbyville is one of 46 institutions in the Tennessee Board of Regents System, the seventh largest system of higher education in the nation. This system comprises six universities, fourteen community colleges, and twenty-six technology centers. More than 80% of all Tennessee students attending public institutions are enrolled in a Tennessee Board of Regents institution.

Shelbyville was the home of Turner College, a HBCU established in October 1885 with support from the Kentucky Annual Conference AME Church. Bishop Henry M. Turner was its founding leader, and eventually the school was renamed for him. A private school supported by local people, there was a high school, a normal school, an "industrial institute," and a Bible study institute included in the institution. Located in two brick buildings, between 1920 and 1924 the institution had 385 students. Apparently the fiscal support for the school didn't continue though, and in the late 1920s the "starving little school" was permanently closed.

== Local government ==
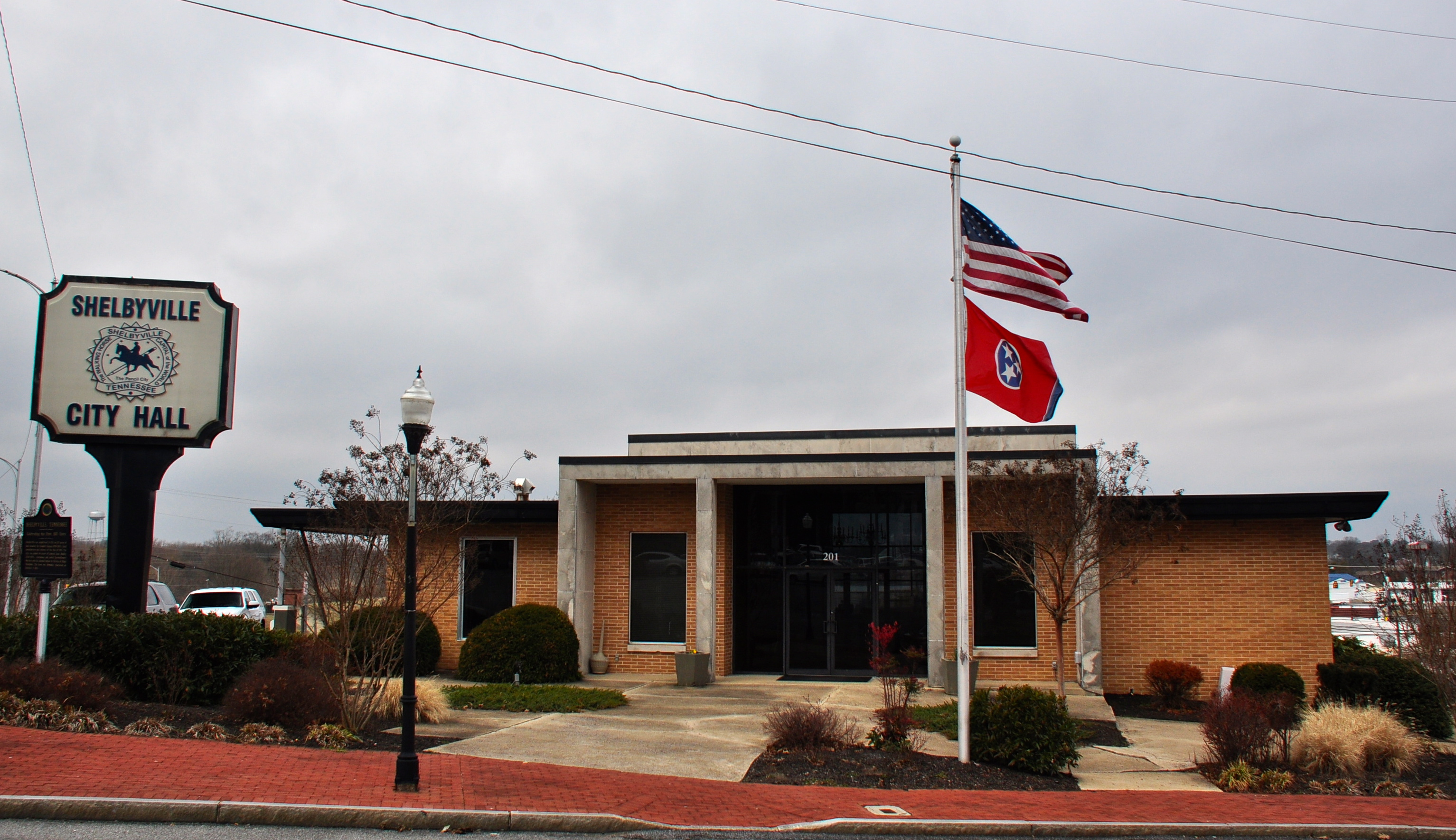
Shelbyville City Hall

The City of Shelbyville, Tennessee Government consists of an elected mayor, six member elected city council, and appointed city manager.

- Mayor – Randy Carroll
- Council Members:
  - Henry Feldhaus
  - Marilyn Ewing
  - Betsy Noel
  - William Christie
  - Josh Blevins
  - Bobby Turnbow
- City Manager – Scott Collins
- City Recorder – Lisa Smith

== Public media and news outlets ==
The Bedford County Post launched in August 2023 when the Shelbyville Times-Gazette closed its doors.

Shelbyville has three news media outlets, Bedford County Post, Shelbyville Times-Gazette and Shelbyville Now.

== Notable people ==
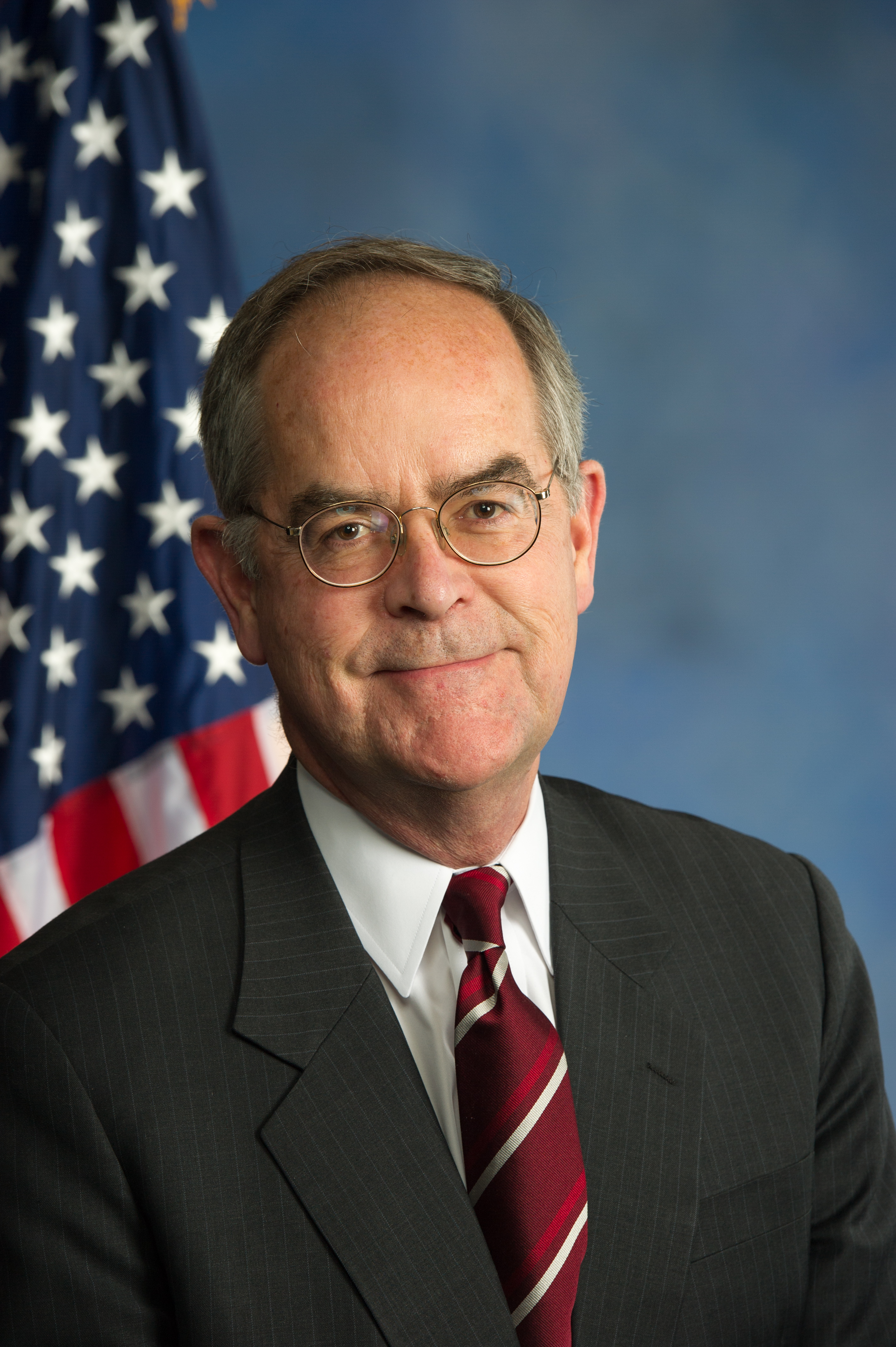
Congressman Jim Cooper

- Gordon Anderson (born 1944), sculptor
- Democratic Congressman Jim Cooper (born 1954). In Shelbyville, his family owns the historic River Side Farmhouse, built for his great-great-grandfather, Jacob Morton Shofner, in 1890, and the Gov. Prentice Cooper House in Shelbyville, built in 1904 for his grandfather, William Prentice Cooper, who served as the mayor of Shelbyville. His father, Prentice Cooper, who was born in the River Side Farmhouse, was the Governor of Tennessee from 1939 to 1945.
- Sumner Archibald Cunningham (1843–1913), founding editor of the Confederate Veteran, buried in Shelbyville's Willow Mount Cemetery.
- Dickie Gardner, horse trainer
- Daryl Holton Convicted Murderer
- Joe Jenkins, Major League Baseball player
- Harold A. Katz (1921–2012), Illinois state representative and lawyer
- Sondra Locke (1944–2018), actress/director
- Judy and Joe Martin, a married couple who trained horses together
- Joyce Paul (1937–2016), country music singer
- Ernest A. Pickup (1887–1970), printmaker
- Samuel Escue Tillman (1847–1942), U.S. Army officer and superintendent of the United States Military Academy at West Point, New York

== In popular culture ==
Shelbyville was featured in Miranda Lambert's video "Famous in a Small Town".

The city was also profiled in the film Welcome to Shelbyville, as part of the PBS documentary film series Independent Lens. The film spotlights recent demographic changes in the community, with a focus on the growing number of immigrants from Latin America and Somalia (both Somalis and people from the Bantu minority ethnic group).

Shelbyville was also featured in GADA film's Our Very Own (2005), directed by Cameron Watson. The film, dubbed "a love story to Shelbyville", highlighted some of the peculiar and humorous memories of Shelbyville in the 1970s.
