= Prentice Cooper =

American politician (1895–1969)

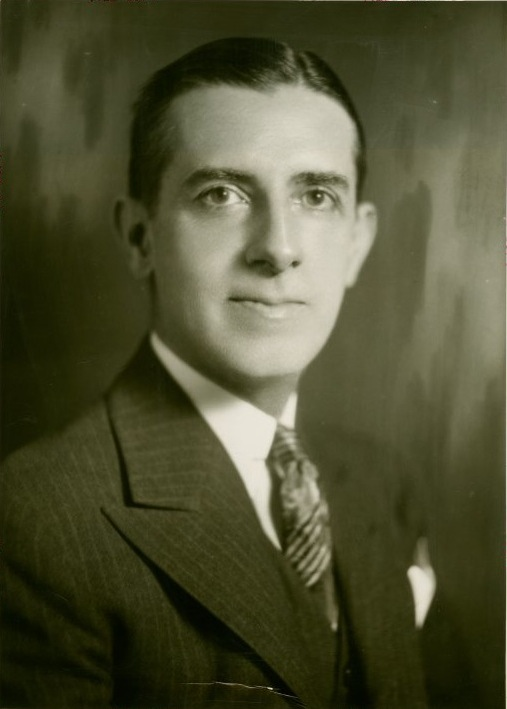
- Cooper circa 1940

United States Ambassador to Peru
- In office July 1, 1946 – June 29, 1948
- President: Harry S. Truman
- Preceded by: William Pawley
- Succeeded by: Harold H. Tittmann, Jr.

39th Governor of Tennessee
- In office January 16, 1939 – January 16, 1945
- Preceded by: Gordon Browning
- Succeeded by: Jim Nance McCord

Member of the Tennessee Senate from the 18th district
- In office 1936–1939
- Preceded by: Leighton Ewell
- Succeeded by: Lem Motlow

Personal details
- Born: William Prentice Cooper Jr. September 28, 1895 Bedford County, Tennessee, U.S.
- Died: May 18, 1969 (aged 73) Rochester, Minnesota, U.S.
- Resting place: Jenkins Chapel Cemetery, Shelbyville, Tennessee
- Party: Democratic
- Spouse: Hortense Powell (m. 1950)
- Children: 3, including Jim and John
- Parent: W. P. Cooper Sr. (father)
- Education: Princeton University (BA); Harvard Law School (LLB)
- Profession: Attorney

Military service
- Allegiance: United States
- Branch/service: United States Army
- Years of service: 1917–1919
- Rank: Second Lieutenant
- Unit: 307th Field Artillery
- Battles/wars: World War I

William Prentice Cooper Jr. (September 28, 1895 – May 18, 1969) was an American politician and diplomat. A conservative Democrat, he served as the 39th governor of Tennessee from 1939 to 1945. He led the state's mobilization efforts for World War II, when over 300,000 Tennesseans joined the armed forces, and numerous defense-related facilities were established across the state. He later served as United States Ambassador to Peru (1946–1948) and chaired Tennessee's 1953 constitutional convention.

== Early life ==
Cooper was born at the home of his maternal grandparents, River Side Farmhouse, along the Duck River in Bedford County, Tennessee. He was the son of William Prentice Cooper, an attorney and businessman, and Argentine (Shofner) Cooper. He attended private schools in nearby Shelbyville and graduated in 1913 from the Webb School in Bell Buckle, where he was president of the debate team.

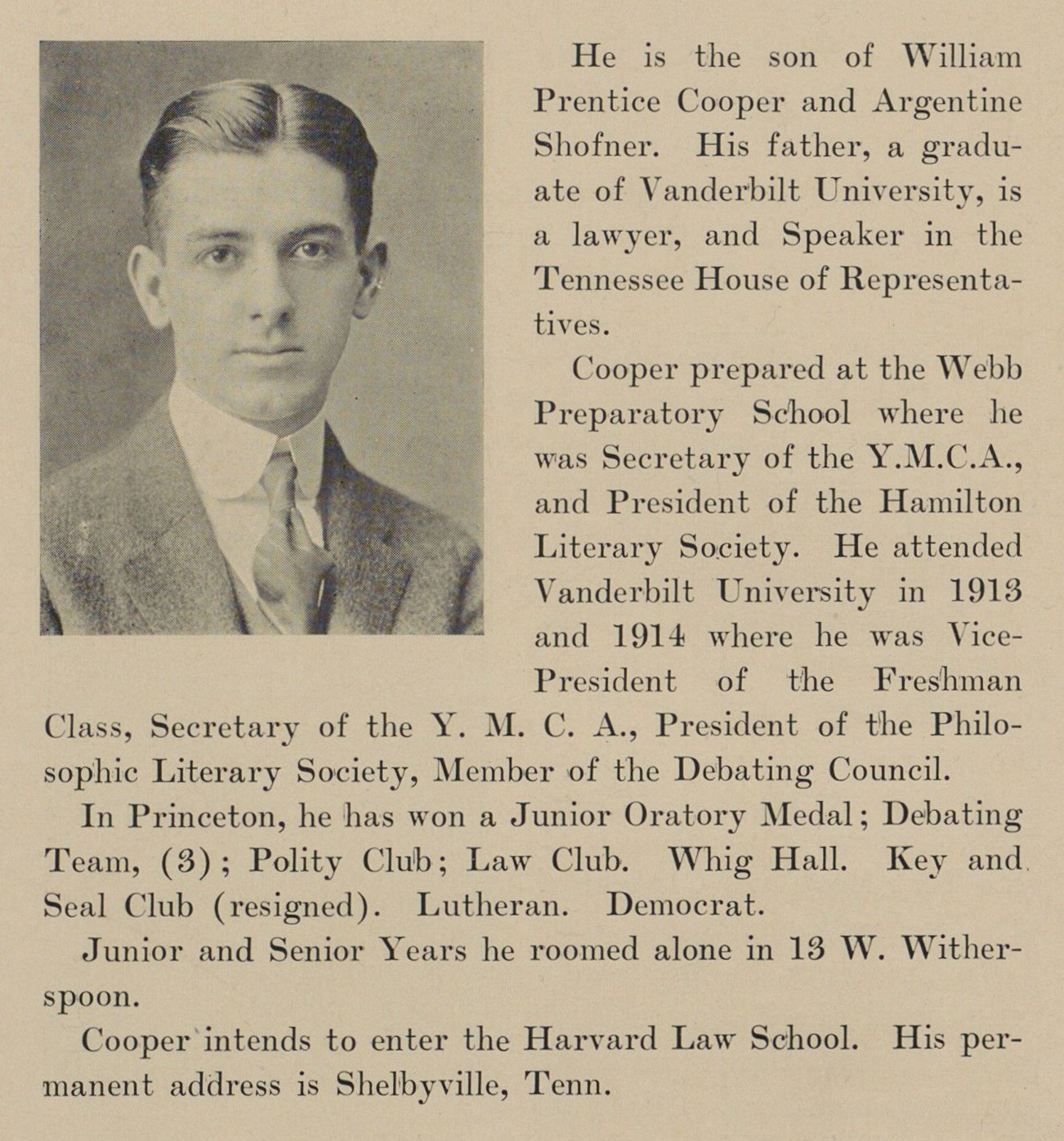
Cooper in the Princeton University yearbook, 1917

In 1914, Cooper enrolled in Vanderbilt University, where he was a member of Phi Delta Theta and vice president of the freshman class. After two years, he transferred to Princeton University, from which he graduated in 1917 with a Bachelor of Arts. Following the U.S. entry into World War I, he enlisted in the Army, initially serving with the 307th Field Artillery before being transferred to Fort Monroe in Virginia. He was discharged in January 1919 with the rank of second lieutenant.

Cooper enrolled in Harvard Law School in February 1919 and graduated with an LL.B in 1921. He was admitted to the bar in 1922 and began practice in Shelbyville. That same year he was elected to the Tennessee House of Representatives, where he secured passage of the state's Uniform Declaratory Judgments Act.

Cooper left the house after one term and was elected district attorney of the state's Eighth Judicial District in 1925. He later served as a city attorney for Shelbyville. In the 1930s, he helped organize the Duck River Electric Membership Corporation, an electric cooperative.

== Governor ==
In 1936 Cooper was elected to the Tennessee Senate, representing Bedford, Coffee, and Moore counties. In 1938, he ran for his party's nomination for governor with the support of Memphis political boss E. H. Crump. Crump was at the height of his power in state politics and had had a falling out with the incumbent, Gordon Browning, over state appointments. He spent thousands of dollars on ads to boost Cooper's image and assail Browning, and Cooper won the nomination, 231,852 votes to 158,854. In the general election, he defeated the Republican candidate, Howard Baker, Sr., 210,567 votes to 83,031.

In the 1940 governor's race, Cooper defeated Knoxville inventor George Roby Dempster in the Democratic primary, and he defeated C. Arthur Bruce by a more than 2-to-1 margin in the general election. In the 1942 race, Judge J. Ridley Mitchell, who despised Crump, sought the party's nomination for governor but was defeated by Cooper, 171,259 votes to 124,037. Cooper easily defeated Republican candidate C.N. Frazier in the general election. Constitutional term limits prevented Cooper from seeking reelection in 1944.

Cooper was Tennessee's governor during World War II. In 1940, anticipating the U.S. entry into the war, he organized the Tennessee State Defense Council, which many other states would later imitate. He also coordinated the establishment of draft boards, organized a state guard to replace the National Guard (which had been called up to active service), and established a model Home Food Supply Program. Large defense-related facilities were built throughout the state, including Fort Campbell, most of which is in Tennessee despite its Kentucky address, a naval training base in Millington, and Sewart Air Force Base in Smyrna. Defense-related plants, employing thousands of Tennesseans, were also built, among them a gunpowder plant at Millington, a shell-loading factory in Milan, and an aircraft factory in Nashville.

In 1942, the federal government appropriated land in what is now Oak Ridge, Tennessee, for the top secret Manhattan Project which was developing the world's first atomic bomb. Cooper was not informed of the purpose of the project. When Anderson Countians complained to Cooper of land appropriations, Cooper accused the federal government of stealing the land for a "socialist" project. When officially notified in July 1943 by an Army lieutenant of the presidential proclamation making the area a military district not subject to state control, he angrily ripped it to pieces. The new MED District Engineer Lieutenant Colonel Kenneth Nichols had to placate him.

Along with defense mobilization, Cooper increased funding for state schools and implemented a program that provided free textbooks for children in grades 1 through 3. He increased aid to the elderly, established a system of tuberculosis hospitals, and acquired land for state parks and state forests. He cut the state payroll and placed taxes on alcohol, and he managed to reduce the state debt by $21 million. In January 1941, a Cooper-supported bill calling for a repeal of the state's poll tax was introduced in the state legislature but was defeated. In 1943, the repeal passed but was thrown out by the Tennessee Supreme Court.

== Later life ==
Cooper was among 12 nominated at the 1944 Democratic National Convention to serve as Franklin D. Roosevelt's running mate in the presidential election that year, receiving 26 votes. In 1946, Cooper was appointed U.S. Ambassador to Peru by President Harry Truman. He convinced Peru to repay an outstanding loan to the United States and had a reputation as a frugal entertainer. An Argentine newspaper accused Cooper of inciting a rebellion by APRA members in Callao in October 1948 (the rebellion took place several months after Cooper had left office), but Cooper adamantly denied any involvement.

Cooper was chairman of the limited state constitutional convention of 1953 which proposed eight amendments to the Tennessee State Constitution, all of which were subsequently adopted by voters. The most notable of these amendments included the repeal of the poll tax and the extension of the gubernatorial term from two years to four years.

Encouraged by pro-segregation interests, Cooper challenged freshman U.S. Senator Albert Gore Sr., in the 1958 Democratic primary but lost handily, with Gore taking about 60% of the vote. Cooper remained an active participant in Democratic Party events until his death from cancer on May 18, 1969, at the Mayo Clinic in Rochester, Minnesota.

== Family and legacy ==
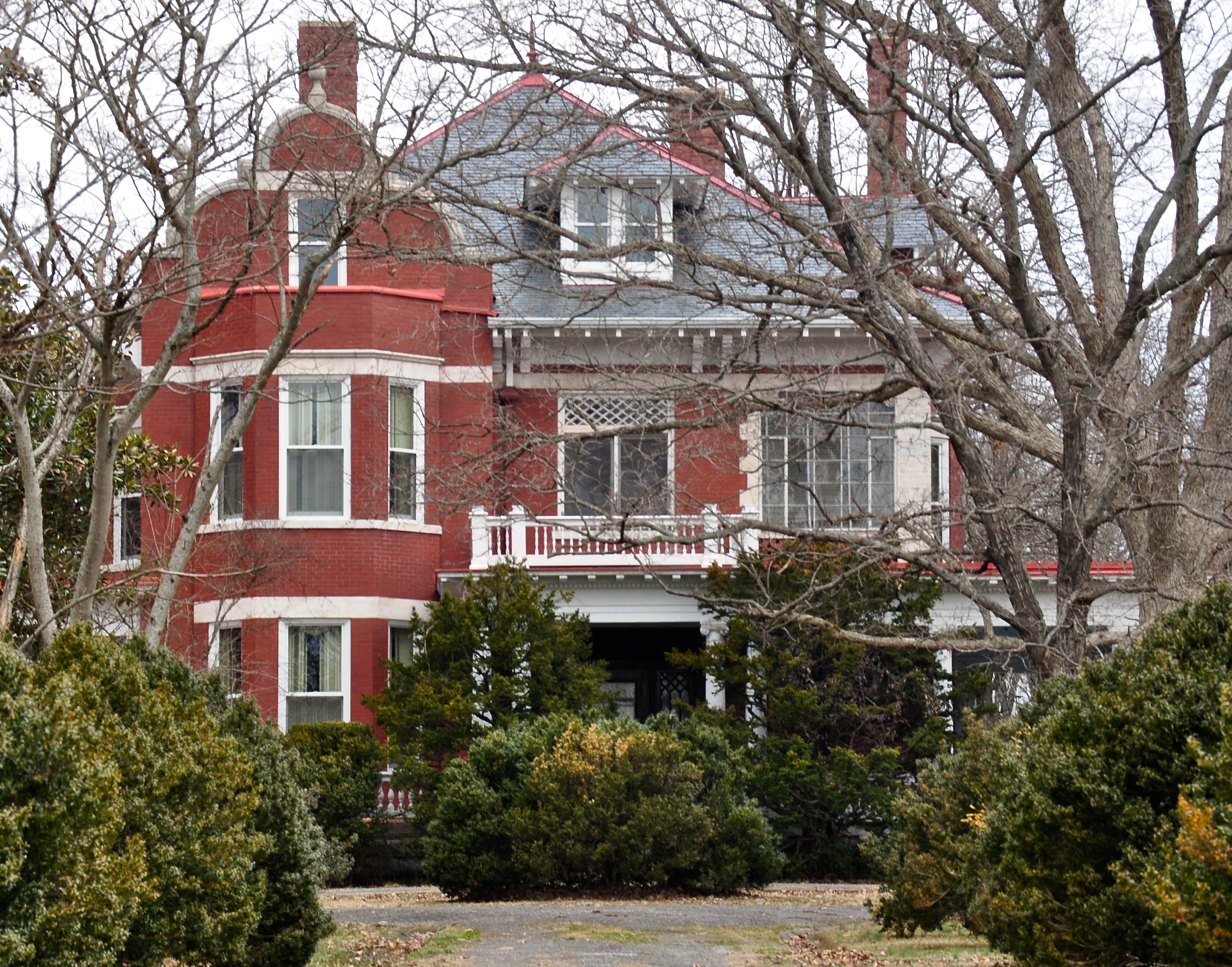
Cooper's house located at Shelbyville, Tennessee.

Cooper married Hortense Hayes Powell (1919–2017) in 1950. They had three sons: William Prentice Cooper, III, Jim Cooper, John Cooper. Since Cooper was a bachelor during his tenure as governor, his mother served as the state's first lady. Jim is a former U.S. congressman, while John was mayor of Metro Nashville.

Prentice Cooper State Forest, located west of Chattanooga, is named for Cooper. Most of the land for the forest was acquired during Cooper's tenure as governor. Residence halls at Tennessee Tech and the University of Tennessee at Martin have also been named for Cooper. Cooper's house stands in Shelbyville and is listed on the National Register of Historic Places.

== See also ==
- List of governors of Tennessee

Party political offices
Preceded by Gordon Browning	Democratic nominee for Governor of Tennessee; 1938, 1940, 1942	Succeeded by Jim Nance McCord
Political offices
Preceded by Gordon Browning	Governor of Tennessee; 1939–1945	Succeeded by Jim Nance McCord
Diplomatic posts
Preceded by William D. Pawley	United States Ambassador to Peru; July 1, 1946 – June 29, 1948	Succeeded by Harold H. Tittmann, Jr.
