= Normandy, Tennessee =

Normandy
- Town
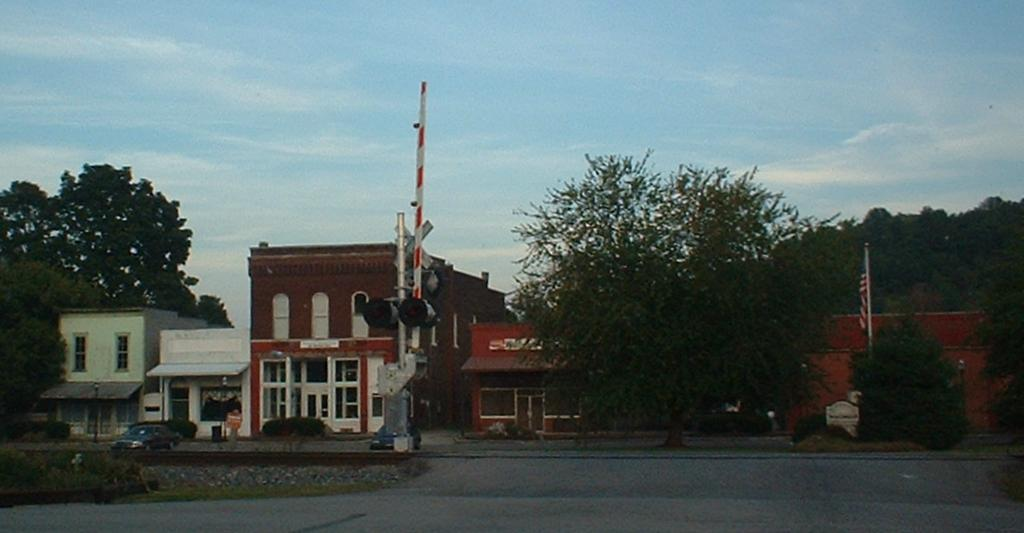
- Downtown Normandy

- Location of Normandy in Bedford County, Tennessee.
- Coordinates: 35°27′8″N 86°15′31″W
- Country: United States
- State: Tennessee
- County: Bedford

Government
  - Mayor: Cody Sharrock

Area
  - Total: 0.24 sq mi (0.63 km^{2})
  - Land: 0.24 sq mi (0.63 km^{2})
  - Water: 0 sq mi (0.00 km^{2})
- Elevation: 830 ft (253 m)

Population (2020)
  - Total: 108
  - Density: 441.3/sq mi (170.39/km^{2})
- Time zone: UTC-6 (Central (CST))
  - Summer (DST): UTC-5 (CDT)
- ZIP code: 37360
- Area code: 931
- FIPS code: 47-53580
- GNIS feature ID: 1295828

- Normandy Historic District
- U.S. National Register of Historic Places
- U.S. Historic district
- Location within Tennessee Location within the United States
- Location: Roughly bounded by Maple and Poplar Sts., Tullahoma Rd., College St., and Old Manchester Rd.
- NRHP reference No.: 85002786
- Added to NRHP: November 7, 1985

Normandy is a town in Bedford County, Tennessee. The population was 108 at the 2020 census. Normandy Dam is located just northeast of the town. The town is listed on the National Register of Historic Places as the Normandy Historic District. The historic Beech Hall is also located near Normandy.

== History ==
Normandy was established in 1852 as a railroad town on the old Nashville & Chattanooga Railroad Line later the Nashville, Chattanooga, & St. Louis Railroad.

The Normandy lake is also a fishing hot spot in Bedford county.

== Geography ==
According to the United States Census Bureau, the town has a total area of 0.2 square miles (0.52 km^{2}), all of it land and some of it water.

== Demographics ==
Historical population
Census	Pop.	Note	%±
1880	76		—
1930	207		—
1940	163		−21.3%
1950	159		−2.5%
1960	119		−25.2%
1970	122		2.5%
1980	118		−3.3%
1990	118		0.0%
2000	141		19.5%
2010	141		0.0%
2020	108		−23.4%

As of the census of 2000, there were 141 people, 53 households, and 35 families residing in the town. The population density was 615.1 inhabitants per square mile (237.5/km^{2}). There were 60 housing units at an average density of 261.7 per square mile (101.0/km^{2}). The racial makeup of the town was 98.58% White, 0.71% Native American, and 0.71% from two or more races. Hispanic or Latino of any race were 0.71% of the population.

There were 53 households, out of which 34.0% had children under the age of 18 living with them, 45.3% were married couples living together, 13.2% had a female householder with no husband present, and 32.1% were non-families. 32.1% of all households were made up of individuals, and 11.3% had someone living alone who was 65 years of age or older. The average household size was 2.66 and the average family size was 3.19.

In the town, the population was spread out, with 27.0% under the age of 18, 13.5% from 18 to 24, 29.8% from 25 to 44, 23.4% from 45 to 64, and 6.4% who were 65 years of age or older. The median age was 34 years. For every 100 females, there were 110.4 males. For every 100 females age 18 and over, there were 98.1 males.

The median income for a household in the town was $40,938, and the median income for a family was $48,125. Males had a median income of $31,429 versus $18,036 for females. The per capita income for the town was $17,729. There were 3.2% of families and 8.8% of the population living below the poverty line, including 18.6% of under eighteens and none of those over 64.
