= Lillie Keenan =

American show jumping rider (born 1996)

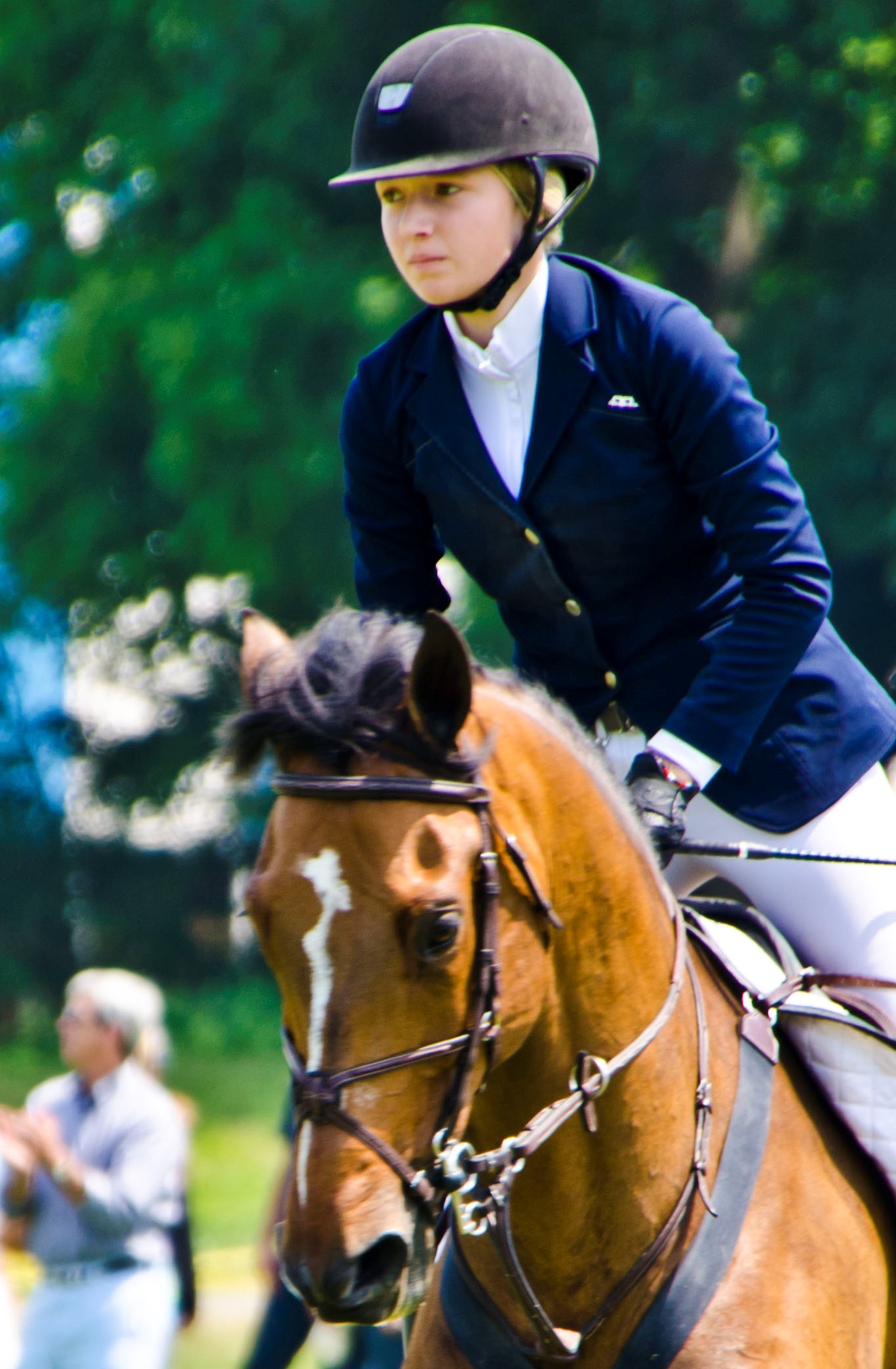
- Lillie Keenan riding Londinium

Personal information
- Nationality: American
- Discipline: Show Jumping
- Born: October 4, 1996 (age 29)
- Home town: New York, NY (USA)

Lillie Carmichael Keenan (born 4 October 1996) is an American show jumping rider. As a junior rider she won the ASPCA Maclay Finals, the USEF Medal Finals, and the Washington International Horse Show Equitation championship, as well as the USHJA International Hunter Derby Finals and double gold at the North American Young Rider Championship.

As a professional, Keenan has been part of many Nations Cup teams for the United States, most notably at the Dublin Horse Show where the Aga Khan Trophy was won by an all female team for the first time.

== Early life ==
Keenan began riding at the age of six after discovering photos of her mother who rode as a junior. She first rode at a small stable in New York City called Claremont Stables, and moved to train at Heritage Farm and worked under the guidance of Andre Dignelli and Patricia Griffith where she began competing. Keenan trained with Heritage for the entirety of her junior career.

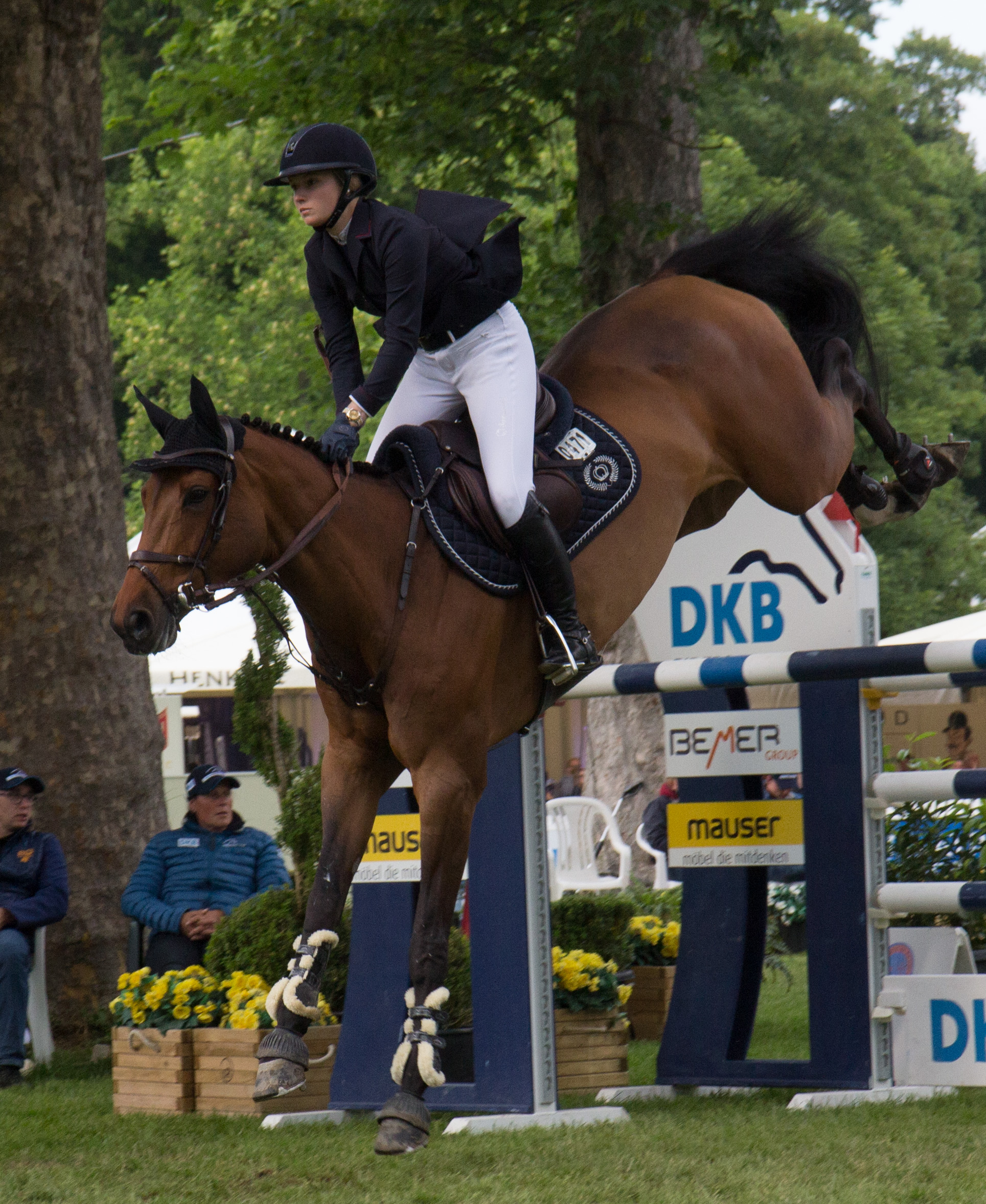
Keenan and Chaccolette

After moving her training to Heritage Farm, Keenan quickly began showing. She spent a few months competing in the children's pony hunters before moving up to the regular pony hunters. At her first attendance at the USEF Pony Finals in 2005, Keenan and the small pony, Dreamworks, were reserve champion in the regular small division, while in 2006 she was reserve champion in the Washington International Horse Show Pony Equitation Final. In 2007, Keenan won all the championships in the regular pony hunter divisions at Pony Finals, winning the small championship on Blackberry, the medium championship and overall grand championship on Enchanted Forest, and the large championship and overall reserve grand championship on Vanity Fair. The following year, Keenan won five out of the six championships at Pony Finals, taking championships home in every division except the regular small pony hunters. She claimed overall grand champion on Neverland, and overall green grand champion on Sparkle Plenty. She was also reserve champion in the USEF Pony Medal Finals on High Cotton.

She graduated from Harvard College in 2019.

== Junior career ==
After a successful year at Pony Finals, Keenan moved to competing on horses. In her second year competing in the equitation, Keenan won the Washington International Horse Show Equitation Finals at the age of 13, and she did so on Uno, a horse she'd ridden for two weeks beforehand due to her horse coming up with an injury shortly before the finals. In 2011, at Junior Hunter Finals, she won in the small junior hunters on Confidential and in the large junior hunters on Madison, also claiming the grand overall champion and reserve on the two horses, respectively. Keenan defeated the professional riders to win the USHJA International Hunter Derby Championship on C Coast Z at 14 years old. She was also champion with C Coast Z at both The National Horse Show and the Washington International Horse Show and won classes in the High Junior Jumpers at The National Horse Show on Vanhattan.

In 2012, Keenan was part of the Zone 2 team to the gold medal in the junior division at the North American Junior and Young Rider Championship. That year, she also won the North American Equitation Championship at the Capital Challenge Horse Show, and was reserve champion at both the USEF Medal Finals and the ASPCA Maclay Finals, all on Clearway.

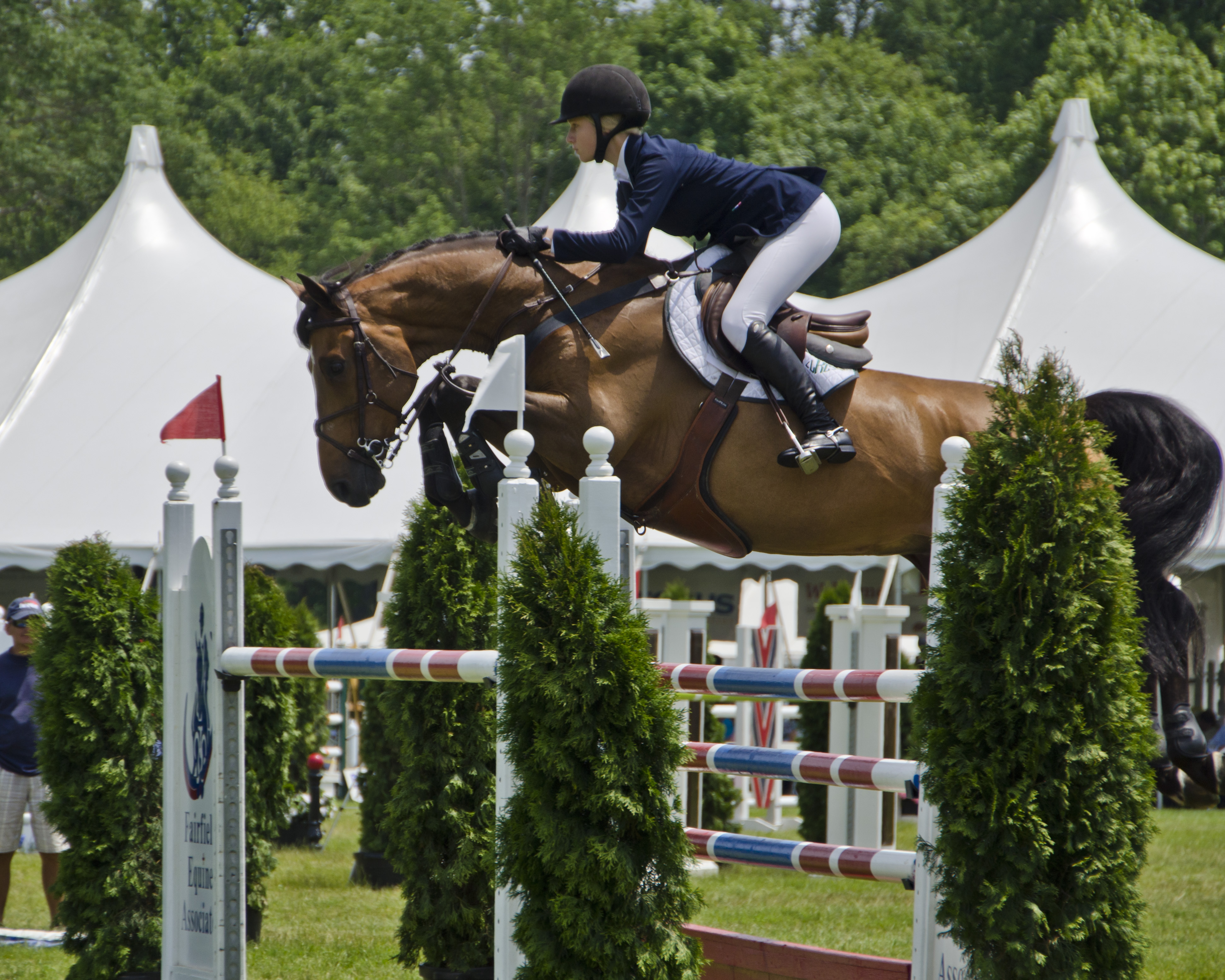
Keenan and gold medal-winning mount Londinium

In 2013, Keenan rode Londinium to both team and individual gold at the North American Young Riders Championship, and she followed it up with individual gold at the USEF National Junior Jumper Championship. In the equitation, Keenan topped both the USEF Medal Finals and the ASPCA Maclay Finals, once again on Clearway, giving her championship honors in three out of the four major equitation finals. She also won the USHJA Hunterdon Equitation Cup. Keenan also won the Grand Junior Hunter Championship at The Devon Horse Show aboard Walk The Line, and won championships at the Pennsylvania National on Walk The Line and Brodeur. She won style awards for her riding at both horse shows. Keenan was awarded Junior Equestrian of the Year by the USEF.

== Professional career ==
In 2014, she was given the opportunity to jump her first Nations Cup at the age of 17 at competitions in Ascona (SUI) and Bratislava (SVK). That year she also jumped at major shows such as world cup qualifier events and The Hampton Classic. In 2015, while a freshman at Harvard University, Keenan declared as a professional rider, and also moved her training to Cian O'Connor's Karlswood Stables. O'Connor was brought on to help Keenan learn the European system, how to train horses up and manage her own stable. She was awarded the Lionel Guerrand-Hèrmes Trophy, given to a young rider in an Olympic discipline that exhibits sportsmanship and horsemanship, in 2015, as well as the Maxine Beard award in 2016, an award given to a rider that shows great potential to represent the United States in international competition.

In 2017, Fibonacci 17 was added to Keenan's stable. That year, Keenan was also part of the team that won the Aga Khan Trophy at The Dublin Horse Show, the first time an all-female team had won the event. In 2018, Keenan rode for the New York Empire, a Global Champions League team. That spring she was shortlisted for the World Equestrian Games. In September, following the World Equestrian Games, Keenan moved her training to McLain Ward's Castle Hill Farm.

In 2019, Keenan had top placings at The Devon Horse Show. In 2020, she had several top finishes in Wellington, Florida before the shows were halted due to the COVID-19 pandemic.

Her current horses include Fasther, Cazaan, Skyhorse, Agana Van Het Gerendal Z, Be Gentle, Chaccolette, and Super Sox.

She resides in Wellington, Florida.

== Major results ==
Major Professional Results
Year	Place	Horse	Event	Rating	Show	Location
2020	3	Fasther	Douglas Elliman Grand Prix	CSI5*	Winter Equestrian Festival	Wellington, FL (USA)
2020	1	Fasther	Martha Jolicoeur Leading Lady Rider	CSI2*	Winter Equestrian Festival	Wellington, FL (USA)
2019	2	Skyhorse	Friends of the Meadow Cup	CSI5*	Spruce Meadows Pan American	Calgary (CAN)
2018	1	Fibonacci 17	Champion Sentower Grand Prix	CSI2*	Opglabbeek	Opglabbeek (BEL)
2018	2	Super Sox	Great American $1 million Grand Prix	NAT	HITS Saugerties	Saugerties, NY (USA)
2017	1	Fibonacci 17	Nations Cup of Spruce Meadows	CSIO5*	Spruce Meadows Masters	Calgary (CAN)
2017	1	Super Sox	Nations Cup of Dublin	CSIO5*	Dublin Horse Show	Dublin (IRL)
2017	1	Super Sox	Lotto Hessen-Preis 1.50m	CSI4*	Wiesbaden	Wiesbaden (GER)
2017	Bronze	Super Sox	FEI Nations Cup Final	CSIO5*	Nations Cup Final	Barcelona (ESP)
2016	3	Super Sox	King George V Cup	CSIO5*	Hickstead	Hickstead (GBR)

Major Junior Results
Year	Place	Horse	Event	Show	Location
2013	1	Clearway	ASPCA Alfred B. Maclay Finals	The National Horse Show	Lexington, KY
2013	1	Clearway	USEF Hunter Seat Medal Finals	Pennsylvania National Horse Show	Harrisburg, PA
2013	1	Clearway	USHJA Hunterdon Cup	USEF Junior Hunter Finals	Saugerties, NY
2013	1	Pumped Up Kicks	$125,000 Purina Grand Prix	HITS Saugerties	Saugerties, NY
2013	Gold	Londinium	Young Riders - Team & Individual	North American Young Riders Championship	Lexington, KY
2013	Gold	Londinium	Junior Jumper Championship - Individual	Pennsylvania National Horse Show	Harrisburg, PA
2013	1	Walk The Line	Grand Junior Hunter Champion	The Devon Horse Show	Devon, PA
2012	Gold	Vanhattan	Junior Rider - Team	North American Junior Riders Championship	Lexington, KY
2012	1	Clearway	North American Equitation Championship	Capital Challenge Horse Show	Upper Marlboro, MD
2011	1	C Coast Z	$100,000 USHJA International Derby Finals	International Derby Finals	Lexington, KY
2011	Champion	Confidential	Grand Junior Hunter Champion	USEF Junior Hunter Finals	Saugerties, NY
2011	Reserve	Madison	Reserve Grand Junior Hunter Champion	USEF Junior Hunter Finals	Saugerties, NY
2010	1	Uno	WIHS Equitation Finals	Washington International Horse Show	Washington, D.C.
2008	Champion	Neverland	Grand Pony Hunter Champion	USEF Pony Finals	Lexington, KY
2008	Champion	Sparkle Plenty	Grand Green Pony Hunter Champion	USEF Pony Finals	Lexington, KY
2007	Champion	Enchanted Forest	Grand Pony Hunter Champion	USEF Pony Finals	Lexington, KY
