= Sydney Shulman =

Israeli showjumper

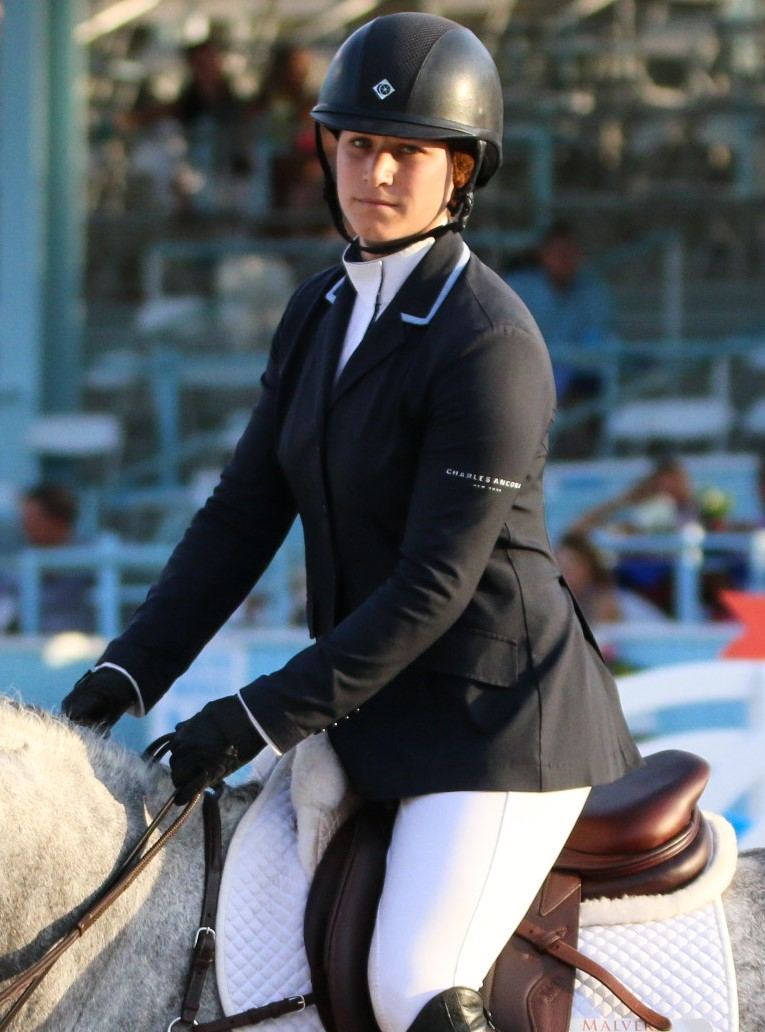

Personal information
- Native name: סידני שולמן
- Nationality: Israeli
- Discipline: Show Jumping
- Home town: Greenwich, CT

Sydney Shulman (Hebrew: סידני שולמן) represents Israel in show jumping competitions, primarily in the United States and Europe. She is known for running a hunter jumper training and sales business, Syd Shulman LLC, which is based in Wellington, Florida, as well as working with her family business, Back Country Farms, of Greenwich, Connecticut.

== Early life ==
Sydney, a third generation horsewoman, is the daughter of Jill Shulman, a trainer in Greenwich, Connecticut. Her mother owns and operates a training program for aspiring equestrians, called Back Country Farm, established in 1990. Being around horses at an early age, Sydney began riding at four years old under the teachings of her mother.

She first began competing in the pony hunters at age 7 and had many wins at notable shows across the country, including Pennsylvania National Horse Show, Washington International Horse Show, and Devon Horse Show. Making USEF Pony Finals history, Sydney won an Individual and Team Gold Medal two years in a row in the pony jumper championship with her pony, Set Sail, who produced all faultless rounds at the Kentucky Horse Park.

== Junior Years ==
Expanding her training from her mother, Sydney received instruction from John Roche, Brianne Goutal, Stacia Madden, Max Amaya and Frank Madden throughout her junior years. Her well rounded training lead to collecting wins across hunter, jumper, and the equitation rings.

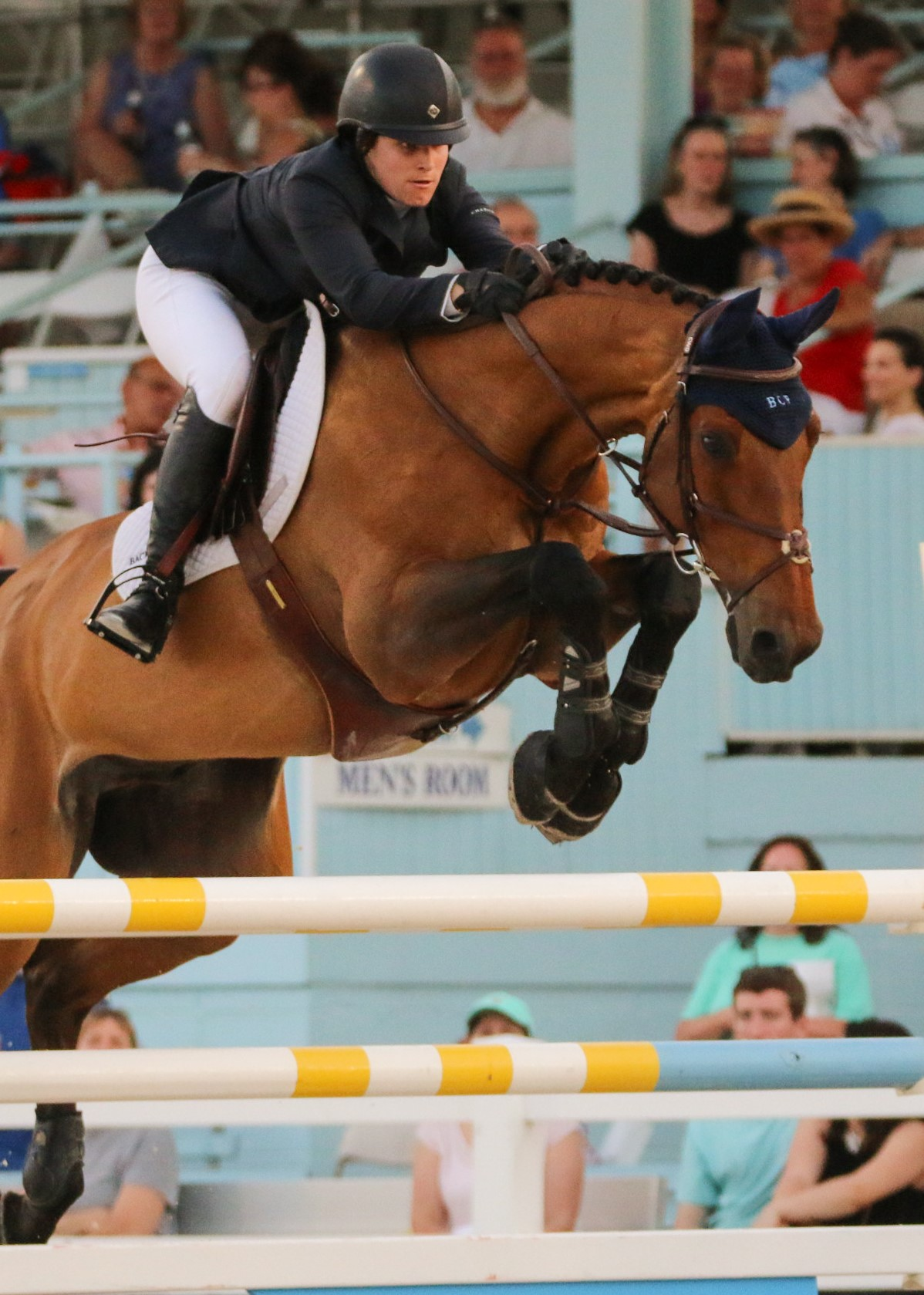
Sydney Shulman competing at The Devon Horse Show

In 2013, Sydney was awarded the Ronnie Mutch Equitation Challenge Trophy, which is given to the high point earning rider in equitation classes at the Devon Horse Show. Her accomplishments continued in the equitation ring by placing in the top six at every East Coast equitation finals over the years.

Sydney highlighted her junior career by winning the Individual Bronze Medal at the North American Young Riders Championship in 2013.

== Professional career ==
Turning professional at the age of 18, Sydney continued to compete all over the United States and occasionally in Europe. Having many success in her career early on, Sydney competed in the USHJA International Hunter Derby Championships, hosted by the Kentucky Horse Park.

Sydney began representing the United States of America in 2018 for show jumping. After a year, she switched to representing Israel in show jumping in January 2019. Her first win for the country was at Tryon International Equestrian Center in North Carolina, winning the Ingles Grand Prix CSI2*, in June 2019. Villamoura, the winning horse, produced many other wins with Shulman including topping the $36,000 International Jumper Accumulator Costume Class featured at the Washington International Horse Show, and later the same week winning, the $50,000 FEI 4* Speed Final, which caused Sydney to be named the Leading International Open Jumper Rider and Leading U25 Rider for 2019 at the event.

In 2020, Sydney won the $37,000 Hermès Under 25 Grand Prix Series Semi-Final CSIO4*, hosted in Wellington, FL (USA), by the Winter Equestrian Festival. She continually has been ranked in the top 100 of the Rolex/USEF Show Jumping Ranking List since turning professional.

While to continuing to compete at the top levels of Show jumping, Sydney offers training and sales services through her company Syd Shulman LLC, based in Wellington, FL, as well as helping her mother run Back Country Farms in Greenwich, CT.
