= Capital One Arena =

Multi-purpose indoor arena in Washington, D.C., U.S.

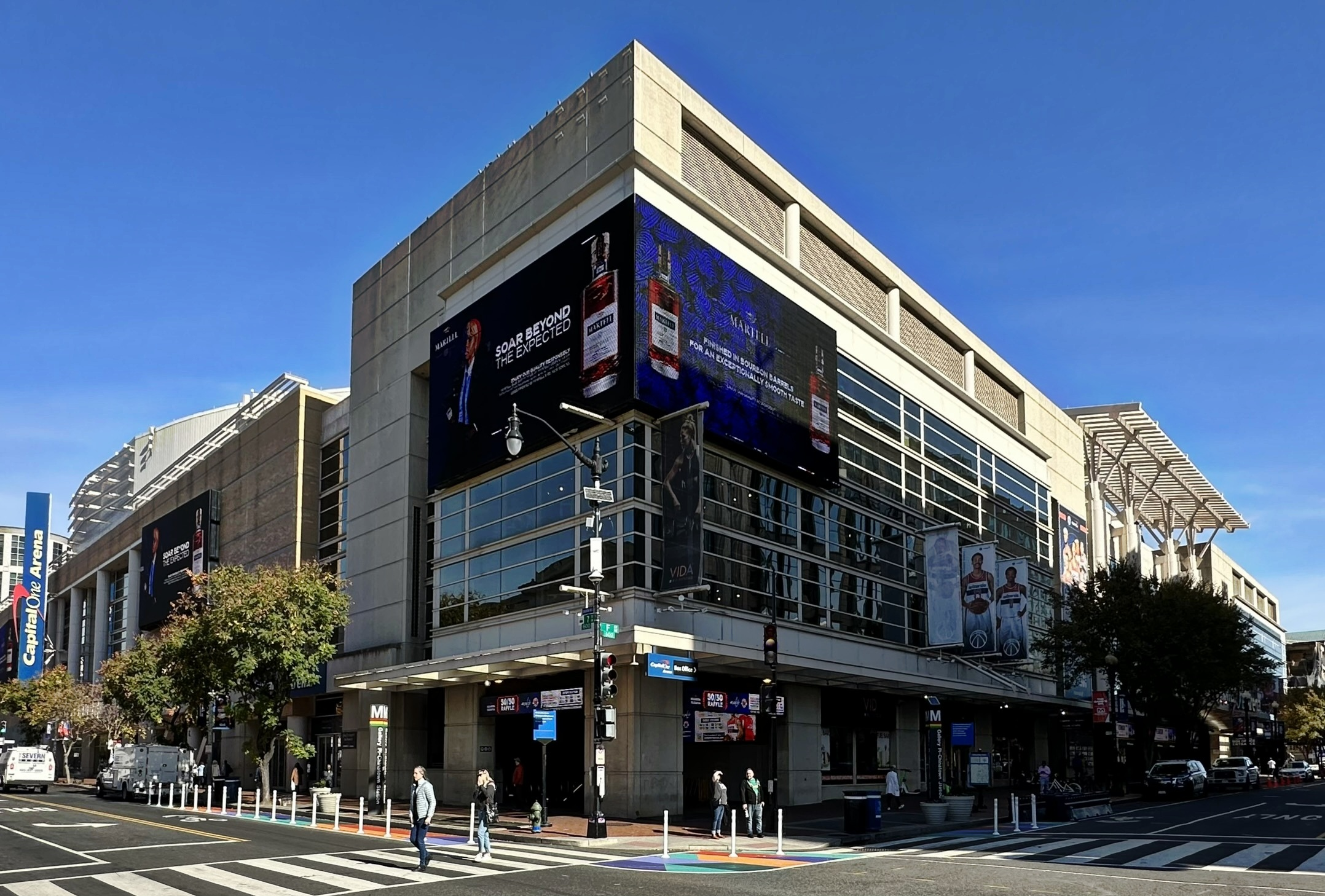
- Capital One Arena in November 2023

- Location within Washington, D.C. Location within the United States
- Former names: MCI Center (1997–2006); Verizon Center (2006–2017)
- Address: 601 F Street NW
- Location: Washington, D.C., U.S.
- Coordinates: 38°53′53″N 77°1′15″W
- Owner: Monumental Sports & Entertainment
- Capacity: Basketball: 20,356; Pro wrestling: 19,300; Ice hockey: 18,573
- Public transit: Washington Metro at Gallery Place

Construction
- Groundbreaking: October 18, 1995
- Opened: December 2, 1997
- Cost: US$260 million (US$501 million in 2025 dollars)
- Architects: Ellerbe Becket; Devrouax & Purnell; KCF-SHG Architects
- Project managers: John Stranix and Seagull Bay Sports, LLC
- Structural engineers: Delon Hampton & Associates
- Services engineer: John J. Christie Associates
- General contractor: Clark/Smoot

Tenants
- Washington Wizards (NBA) (1997–present); Washington Capitals (NHL) (1997–present); Georgetown Hoyas (NCAA) (1997–present); Washington Mystics (WNBA) (1998–2018); Washington Power (NLL) (2001); Washington Valor (AFL) (2017–2019)

Website
- capitalonearena.com

Capital One Arena is a multi-purpose indoor arena in Washington, D.C., United States. Located in the Chinatown section of the larger Penn Quarter neighborhood, the arena sits atop the Gallery Place rapid transit station of the Washington Metro. The arena opened on December 2, 1997, as MCI Center, and was renamed Verizon Center in 2006 after MCI was acquired by Verizon Communications. The name was changed to Capital One Arena in 2017 when Capital One bank, headquartered in nearby Tysons, Virginia, purchased the naming rights.

Owned and operated by Monumental Sports & Entertainment, it is the home arena of the Washington Capitals of the National Hockey League (NHL), the Washington Wizards of the National Basketball Association (NBA), and the Georgetown University men's basketball team. It was also home to the Washington Mystics of the Women's National Basketball Association (WNBA) from 1998 to 2018, after which they moved to the CareFirst Arena in southeast Washington for the 2019 season.

== History ==
The block where the arena was built, between 6th and 7th and F and G Streets, historically held a mix of residences and small businesses. By the 1960s, it was suffering from urban decay, like much of the eastern end of Downtown Washington. In 1973, while the Gallery Place Metro station was being developed below it, the District government bought the land in hopes of redeveloping it. Capital Landmark Associates was selected in 1979 to develop the site with a planned mixed-use complex including retail, offices, apartments, and a hotel. Most of the remaining buildings on the site were demolished in 1985. The project languished for many years but never materialized, and was finally canceled in 1992.

Before the arena's opening, the Capitals and the Wizards (then known as the Washington Bullets) played at USAir Arena in the Washington suburb of Landover, Maryland. The teams experienced subpar attendance because the location was inconvenient for both Washington and Baltimore residents, and their arena, though only 20 years old, was not up to the standards of other NBA and NHL venues. In December 1993, Abe Pollin, the owner of both teams, began studying options to move the teams to a new arena to be built with public financing, with possible locations including Baltimore, downtown Washington, and Laurel, Maryland.

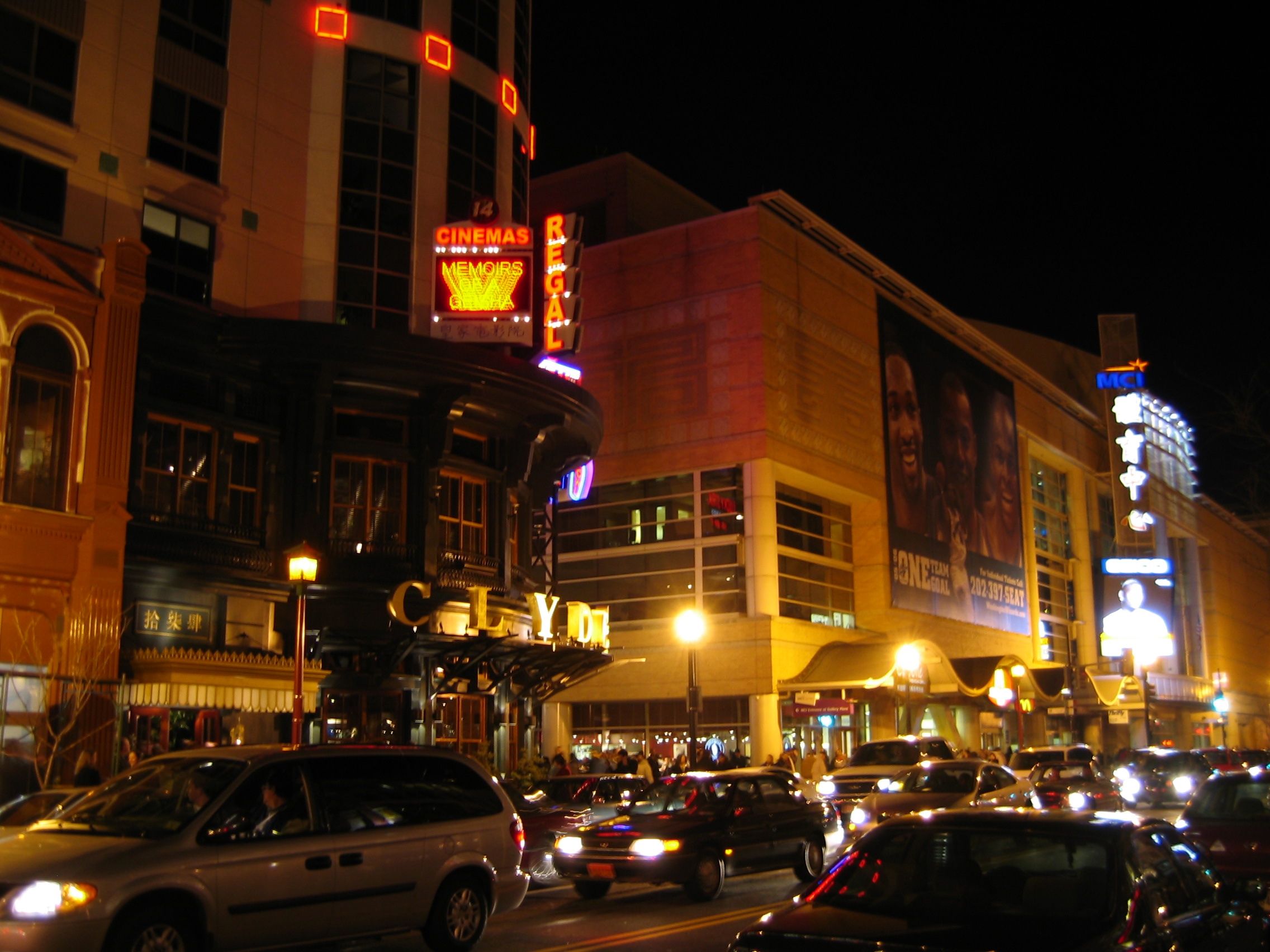
The arena in January 2006, then known as MCI Center

A group of Washington business leaders brokered a deal between Pollin and the District government to build an arena at the Gallery Place site, with the District paying for the $150 million project, which was envisioned to have shopping, food, and exhibitors for daily use even when there was no arena event. The D.C. Council approved a special tax on businesses to finance the deal. However, a competing proposal soon emerged, when Robert Johnson, head of Black Entertainment Television, offered to build the arena with mostly private financing. With the arena deal facing criticism amid the District's budget crisis, Pollin eventually agreed to privately fund the construction of the building, which ultimately came to $200 million (US$385 million in 2025 dollars). The District would pay for other costs, including purchasing the portion of the land it did not already own, preparing the site, and expanding the Metro station; these eventually amounted to $79 million (US$145 million in 2025 dollars). The District leased the land to Pollin at a below-market rate of $300,000 per year.

A naming rights deal was struck with MCI Communications to name the arena as the MCI Center. The groundbreaking ceremony for the project was held in October 1995. On December 2, 1997, the arena held its first event, a game between the Wizards and the Seattle SuperSonics, with President Bill Clinton in attendance. The arena had a 25,000-square-foot (2,300 m^{2}) Discovery Channel Store from 1998 to 2001 and the MCI National Sports Gallery, an interactive sports museum with interactive games, memorabilia, and the American Sportscasters Hall of Fame inside from 1998 to 2000 or 2001 which was repurposed for office space. Clinton toured the gallery before the game, playing the museum games. A block of F Street NW between 6th and 7th Street NW outside the arena was declared Fun Street, complete with signage. This block later was declared Abe Pollin Way in 2007. The arena was noted for building spectator seats vertically rather than out, creating better views for all attending albeit with limited leg room in the upper levels, as well as spacious quarters for players and coaches with advanced competitive research technology. The arena concourse featured multimedia arenaNet stations where fans could check scores, watch highlights, and send digital postcards over email. These replaced an abandoned idea to have smart seats with televisions and technology that was scrapped due to technological challenges. Arena technology was powered by a virtual LAN software and switching technology called ArenaNET from Cabletron Systems.

In 1999, a group led by technology executive Ted Leonsis bought a 36% stake in Pollin's holdings, including the MCI Center, as well as full ownership of the Capitals. The Leonsis group increased its stake to 44% in 2000.

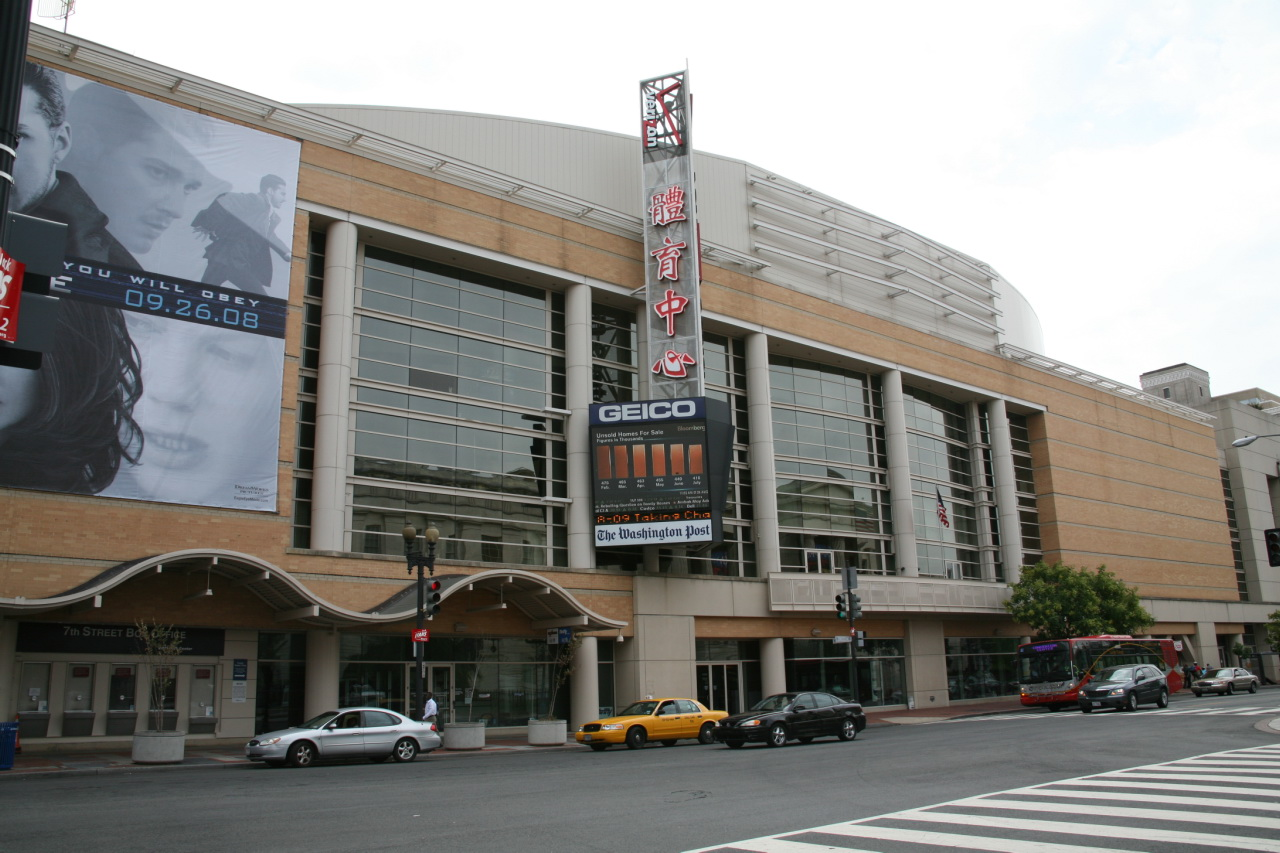
Capital One Arena, then the Verizon Center, in August 2008

In January 2006, Verizon Communications purchased MCI and the arena's name was changed accordingly to Verizon Center. VIDA Fitness opened its first location in the arena that same year. The following year, in 2007, the "first true indoor high-definition LED scoreboard" was installed in the arena. In May 2024, VIDA Fitness announced that they would close their Gallery Place location. Gallery Place, a 14-screen movie theater, opened at Capital One Arena in 2004.

In June 2010, following Pollin's death in November 2009, the Leonsis group, newly organized as Monumental Sports & Entertainment, bought out Pollin's interests, gaining full ownership of the arena and the Wizards.

A report emerged in May 2015 that Verizon would not renew its naming rights to the Verizon Center when its agreement with Monumental was to end in 2018. In the same week, it was announced that Etihad Airways signed a deal to become the official airline of the arena, sparking speculation that Etihad might be the leading contender to assume naming rights in 2017. However, on August 9, 2017, it was announced that the Tysons, Virginia-based bank Capital One had purchased the rights, renaming the venue Capital One Arena. In October 2024, it was revealed that Etihad Airways is no longer the official airline for Capital One Arena as United Airlines (which operates a hub at Dulles International Airport) was chosen as the new official airline.

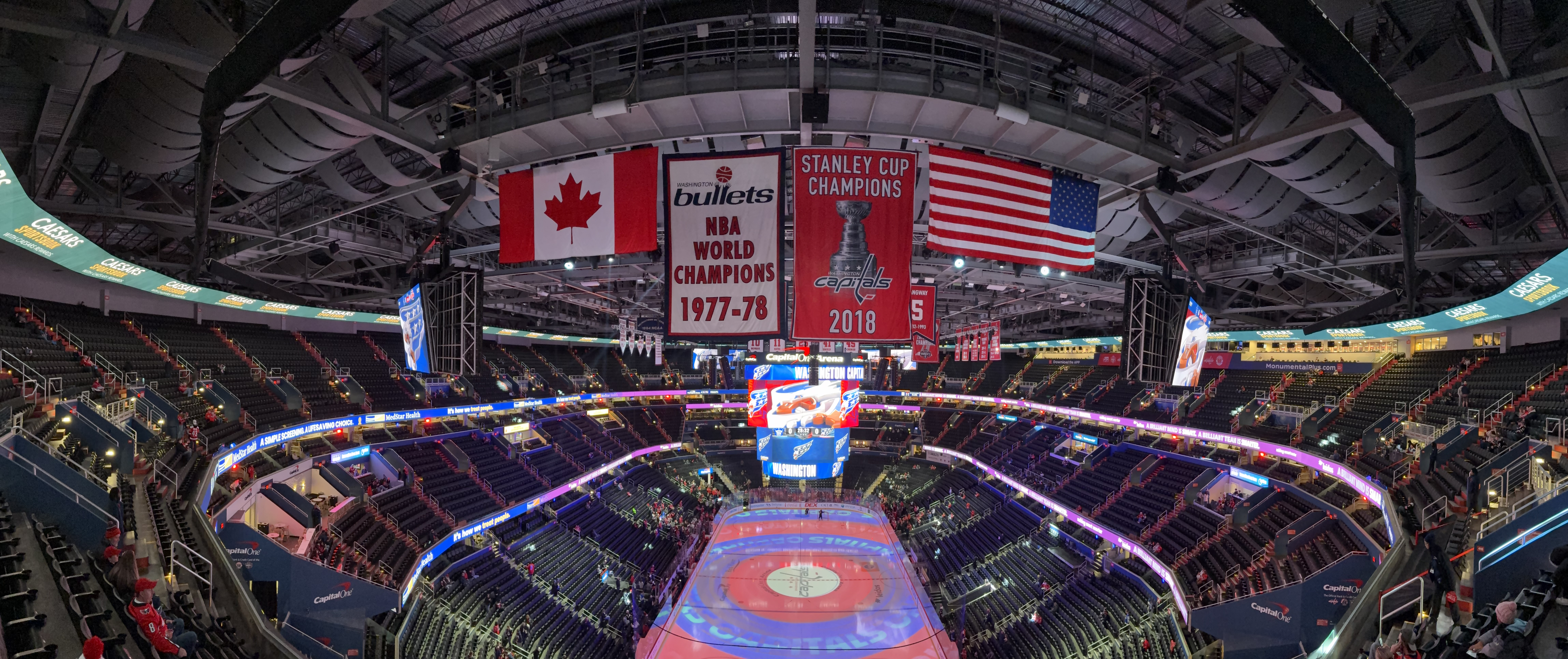
Panorama of the Capital One Arena before the Toronto Maple Leafs @ Washington Capitals matchup on Black Friday 2025.

In 2019 and 2020, Monumental Sports undertook a $30 million renovation of the arena. This included completely replacing the arena's seating, improving the concourse, and altering many of the arena's dining options. A new, larger overhead video board was also added as well as a new SkyRing video screen that goes around the top of the arena.

In July 2020, bookmaker William Hill opened a sportsbook at the arena, following the 2018 legalization of sports betting in Washington. It was the first brick-and-mortar sportsbook in the District, and the first to open at a professional sports venue in the United States.

On June 23, 2023, The Washington Post reported that Monumental Sports was considering moving the Capitals and Wizards to a new arena in the National Landing area of Arlington in Northern Virginia if the Washington, D.C. government did not invest in upgrades to the arena and surrounding area. Despite this, the article outlined that the city intended on continuing its dialogue with the company to keep both teams in Capital One Arena. Monumental later pivoted to a part of the National Landing area lying in a different Northern Virginia jurisdiction, announcing on December 13, 2023, that it planned to build the new arena in the Potomac Yard area of Alexandria, Virginia Under the revised plan, Capital One Arena would have remained in use as a concert and event venue during the NBA and NHL seasons, and also become the permanent home of Monumental's Women's National Basketball Association (WNBA) team, the Washington Mystics. In March 2024, after officials in Alexandria announced that the $2 billion entertainment and sports complex plans were scrapped, Washington, D.C. mayor Muriel Bowser announced that she had signed a deal with both teams' majority owner, Ted Leonsis, to keep the Capitals and Wizards in the District "at least until 2050." The deal will see a massive renovation to the arena which will be completed by 2028 in six phases, changing the exterior and interior that will include new technology and improved fan experiences.

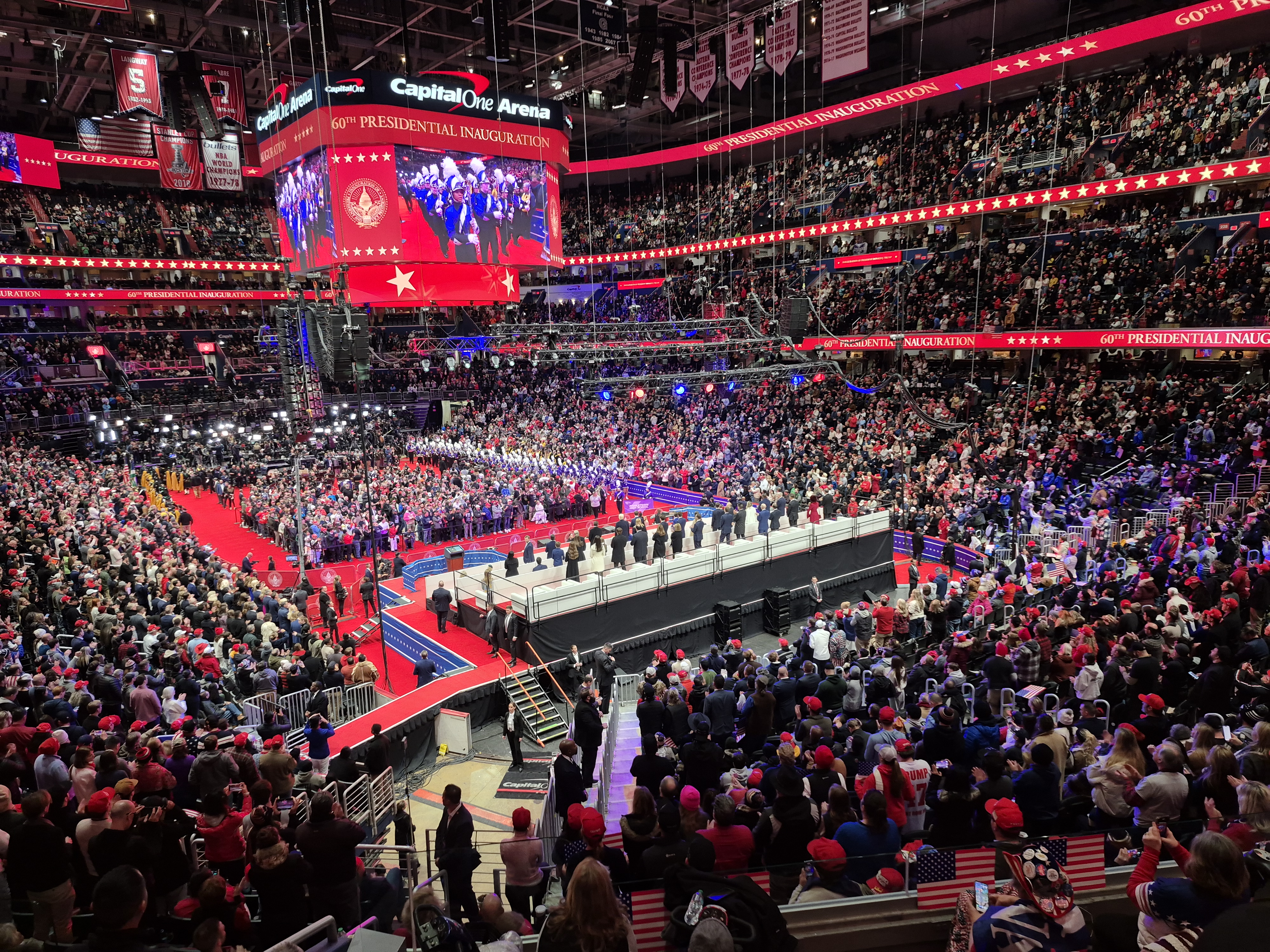
Students from Middletown High School in Ohio march at an indoor Presidential Inauguration parade event in Washington on Monday, January 20, 2025.

Capital One Arena is undergoing a multi-year $1 billion renovation that will completely alter the exterior and parts of the interior of the arena. $515 million is coming from the District of Columbia government, while the rest is being paid for by Monumental Sports and Entertainment, which owns the teams. The renovation is expected to be completed in time for the start of the 2027–28 NHL and NBA seasons. In August 2026, Capital One agreed to a 20-year extension to their naming rights deal.

The indoor parade of the second inauguration of Donald Trump took place in the arena on January 20, 2025.

== Sports ==
=== Ice hockey ===
The Capitals playing the Pittsburgh Penguins in May 2017 during the 2017 Stanley Cup playoffs at Capital One Arena, then known as the Verizon Center

The arena has been home to the Capitals NHL team since its opening. As a result, numerous memorable moments in franchise history have occurred in the arena. The arena hosted games three and four of the 1998 Stanley Cup Final, when the Capitals lost to the Detroit Red Wings in four games. The Red Wings hoisted the namesake Stanley Cup in the arena on June 16, 1998, after winning game four by a score of 4–1. On April 5, 2008, the Capitals won the Southeast Division in the last game of the regular season, after beating the Florida Panthers 3–1. Game 2 of the 2009 Eastern Conference semifinals between the Capitals and the Pittsburgh Penguins, played on May 4, 2009, saw dueling hat tricks from Ovechkin and rival Sidney Crosby of the Pittsburgh Penguins, culminating in a 4–3 victory for Washington thanks to an additional goal from David Steckel. The arena also hosted games three and four of the 2018 Stanley Cup Final. The Capitals won both games and then went on to win game five in Las Vegas to capture the Stanley Cup for the first major sports championship for a Washington, D.C. team since the 1991 Washington Redskins. The Capitals had their Stanley Cup banner installation ceremony in the arena before their first game of the next season, which took place on October 3, 2018.

On April 4, 2025, with Wayne Gretzky and commissioner Gary Bettman in attendance, Ovechkin scored goals 893 and 894 in a 5-3 Capitals win over the Chicago Blackhawks. This tied him with Gretzky for the all-time goals record.

==== Non-NHL hockey events ====
The arena hosted the 2009 "Frozen Four", the final round of the 2009 NCAA Division I men's ice hockey tournament Boston University took Miami OH in overtime 4–3.

The inaugural 2024 Capital Hockey Classic took place on December 12, 2024, This event marked the first full-fledged college hockey event since the 2009 D1 Finals. It featured military and club collegiate ice hockey teams.

The Capital Hockey Classic aimed to capture attention, especially since it occurred just two days before the Army-Navy game at the nearby Northwest Stadium. The event included two matches: the first game featured Army vs Navy Club hockey at 5PM, followed by the Army Black Knights vs. the Penn State Nittany Lions D1 match at 7PM.

On January 18, 2026, the Professional Women's Hockey League (PWHL) played their first game in Washington, D.C. between the Montreal Victoire and New York Sirens. The Sirens won 2–1 against the Victoire in front of 17,228 fans, setting a then-attendance record for women's hockey in the United States. The PWHL returned on January 2, 2027 for a game against the Boston Fleet and Ottawa Charge and on March 10, 2027 for a game between the Vegas Vanguards and Detroit Clutch.

=== Basketball ===
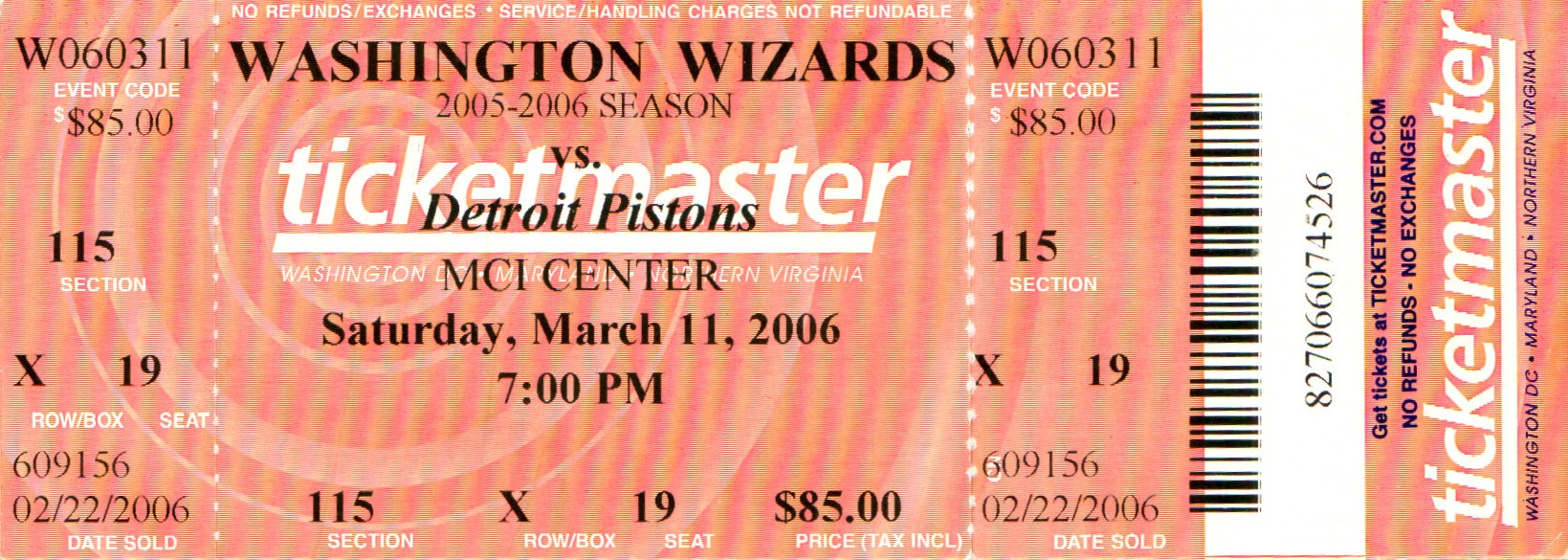
A ticket from a 2006 game at the then-MCI Center between the Wizards and Detroit Pistons

The arena has been home to the Wizards NBA team since its opening and was home to the Washington Mystics WNBA team from 1998 to 2018, when the Mystics moved to a new, smaller arena in the Congress Heights area of southeast Washington. In 2024, the Mystics played their June 7 and September 19 games against the Indiana Fever at Capital One Arena, citing rising demand to see Fever star Caitlin Clark. The Georgetown Hoyas men's basketball team has also played there since the arena's opening. The arena has hosted three basketball all-star games: the 2001 NBA All-Star Game and the 2002 and 2007 WNBA All-Star Games. The arena has been home to many playoff games, but has yet to host an NBA Finals.

The arena has hosted games for the NCAA Division I men's basketball tournament several times. It hosted first- and second-round games in 1998, 2002, 2008 and 2011, and hosted the regional finals (sweet sixteen and elite eight) in 2006, 2013, 2019, and 2026. Most notably the 2005–06 George Mason Patriots men's basketball team from nearby Fairfax, Virginia advanced to the Final Four in the arena. The arena also hosted the Atlantic 10 men's basketball tournament in 2018 and 2022. It hosted the ACC men's basketball tournament in 2005, 2016, and 2024. In 2017 the arena hosted the Big Ten men's basketball tournament.

The Harlem Globetrotters play in the arena annually, often against the Washington Generals, a team named for President Dwight Eisenhower.

=== Combat sports ===
Mike Tyson's final non-exhibition fight (Mike Tyson vs. Kevin McBride) was held at the arena on June 11, 2005. On October 1, 2011, UFC Live: Cruz vs. Johnson was held at the arena. On December 7, 2019, UFC on ESPN: Overeem vs. Rozenstruik was held at the arena.

=== Arena football ===
In 2017, the Washington Valor began play at the arena for their inaugural season in the Arena Football League. The Valor folded in 2019 and the arena has not hosted an Arena League game since.

=== Gymnastics and figure skating ===
The arena hosted the 2003 World Figure Skating Championships and the 2016 Kellogg's Tour of Gymnastics Champions.

== Music, entertainment, and other events ==
The arena is a major location for concerts and cultural events in the D.C. region. Among the musical performers, cultural figures, and entertainment shows that have performed at the arena are Beyoncé, Destiny's Child, Alicia Keys, Missy Elliott, Olivia Rodrigo, Duran Duran, Ricardo Arjona, Kylie Minogue, Janet Jackson, Mariah Carey, Muse, Paul McCartney, Queen, U2, Iron Maiden, Shakira, Lady Gaga, Madonna, Britney Spears, The Three Tenors, Drake, Barbra Streisand, Bon Jovi, Prince, Tim McGraw, Faith Hill, the Dalai Lama, Tina Turner, Keith Urban, Paul Simon, Sting, The Police, Taylor Swift, Tame Impala, Coldplay, Tyler, the Creator, Elton John, Usher, Green Day, Blink-182, The Who, Bad Bunny, Billie Eilish, Dua Lipa, Harry Styles, Gorillaz, Trans-Siberian Orchestra, Cage the Elephant, Monster Jam, Disney on Ice, Ateez, Seventeen, NCT Dream, Jonas Brothers, Doja Cat, Gracie Abrams, LE SSERAFIM, AJR, Katseye, IU, Howard University graduation speech by U.S. president Joe Biden, and a Michelle Obama book tour event.

The Washington International Horse Show took place every October in the arena for more than 20 years through 2019, after which it was moved out because of the COVID-19 pandemic.

The arena served as the venue for U.S. president Donald Trump's inaugural parade on January 20, 2025. The day before, Trump held a rally in the arena.

=== Professional wrestling ===
The arena has hosted various professional wrestling events; it hosted the final four editions of WCW's Starrcade pay-per-view, followed by WWE's Backlash in 2000, SummerSlam in 2005, Cyber Sunday in 2007, Survivor Series in 2009, Capitol Punishment in 2011, and Battleground in 2016. The arena frequently hosts Raw and SmackDown episodes as well.

On October 2, 2019, the Capital One Arena hosted the first episode of Dynamite, the first weekly television series of All Elite Wrestling (AEW).

On December 13, 2025, the Capital One Arena hosted WWE's Saturday Night's Main Event XLII, featuring John Cena's final match in his 26-year wrestling career.

== Criticism ==
=== Gentrification ===
When the arena opened, there was concern that it would lead to the displacement of Chinese businesses and culture in the city's Chinatown. The surrounding area has indeed been dramatically gentrified, and most of the Chinese residents and businesses who lived and operated in the neighborhood when the arena first opened have been displaced because of the spike in real estate prices. 2011 estimates hold that the number of Chinese in the neighborhood is down to around 400 to 500. The Chinese-owned restaurants and businesses in the Chinatown area are largely gone and there has not been a full-service Chinese grocery in the neighborhood since 2005.

A similar stadium project proposed for Philadelphia's Chinatown drew comparisons in 2023 to the Washington arena; it was cancelled amid community backlash.

=== Ice quality ===
In December 2007, then-Capitals captain Chris Clark said he believed the arena had the worst ice in the NHL. "There's a lot of ruts in the ice. It's soft. It's wet half the time. I could see a lot of injuries coming from the ice there. It could cost [players] their jobs... Even guys on other teams say the same thing. When we're facing off, they say, 'How do you guys play on this?'" More than two years later, Capitals owner Ted Leonsis wrote, "As to the conditions of the ice at the arena, we are working with all parties to improve the quality and consistency". In 2018, WJLA reported that during playoff games, which take place during warm months, the arena adds portable refrigeration units outside the arena to improve the ice.

== Gallery ==
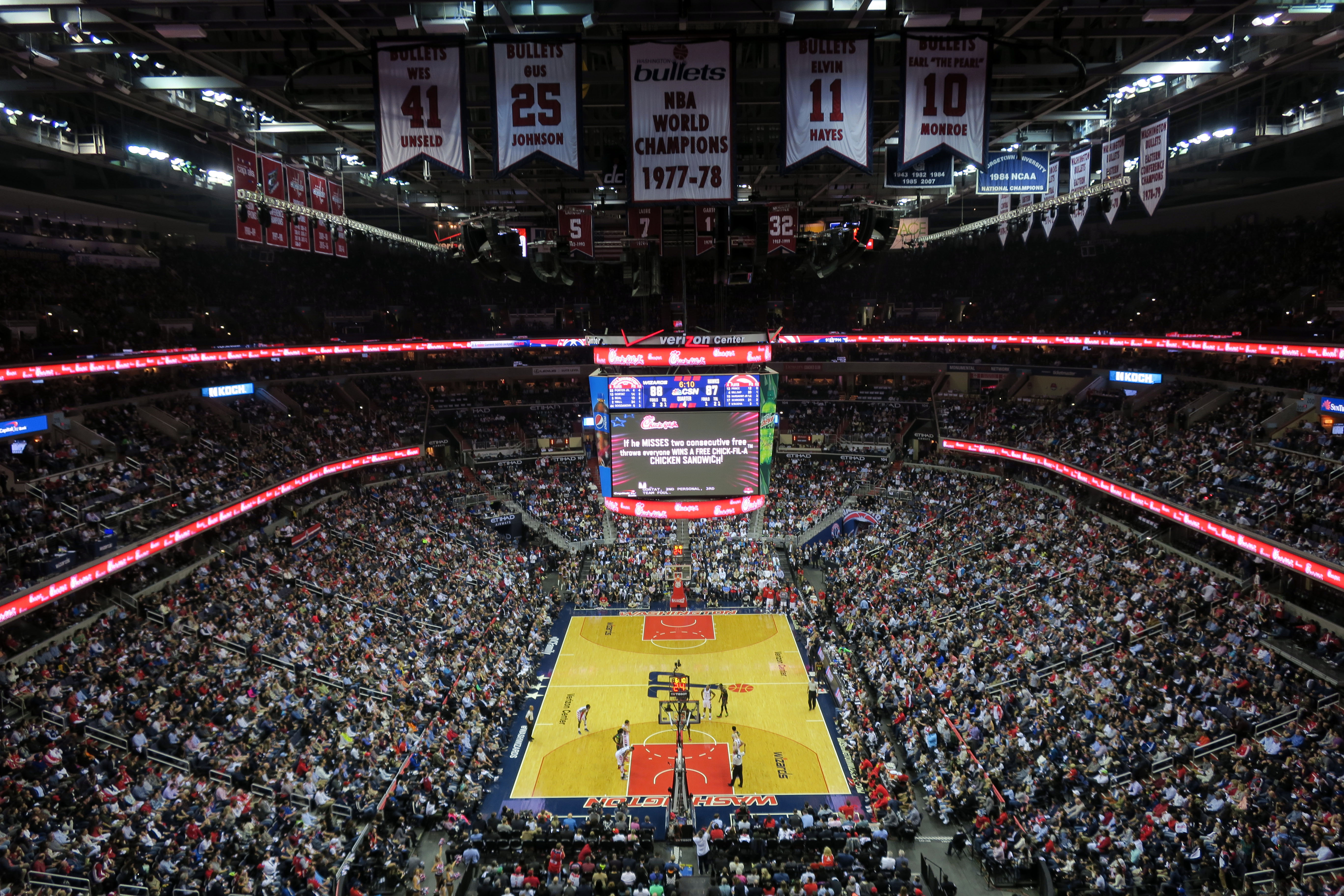
A Washington Wizards game in 2017

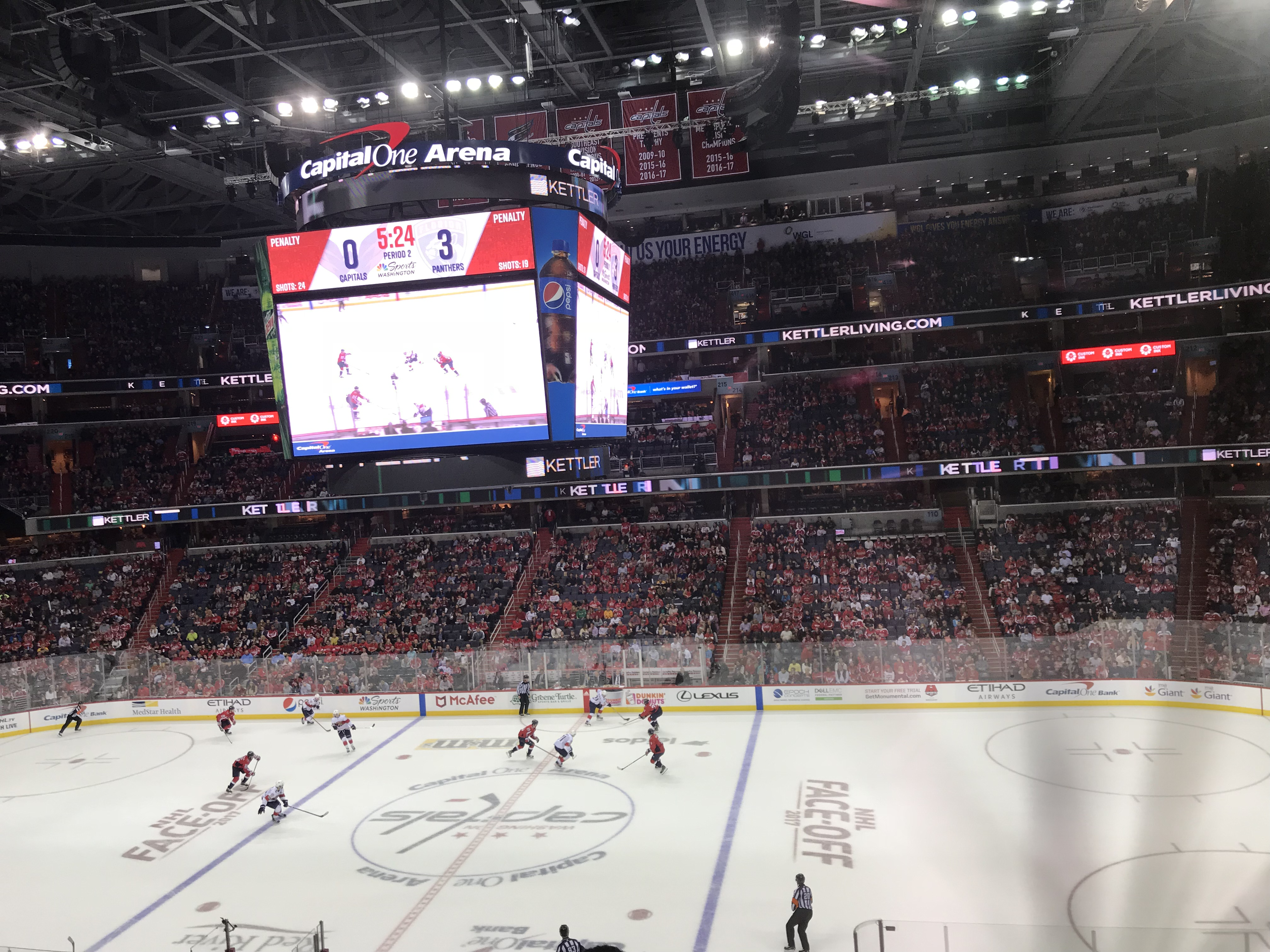
A Washington Capitals game in 2017

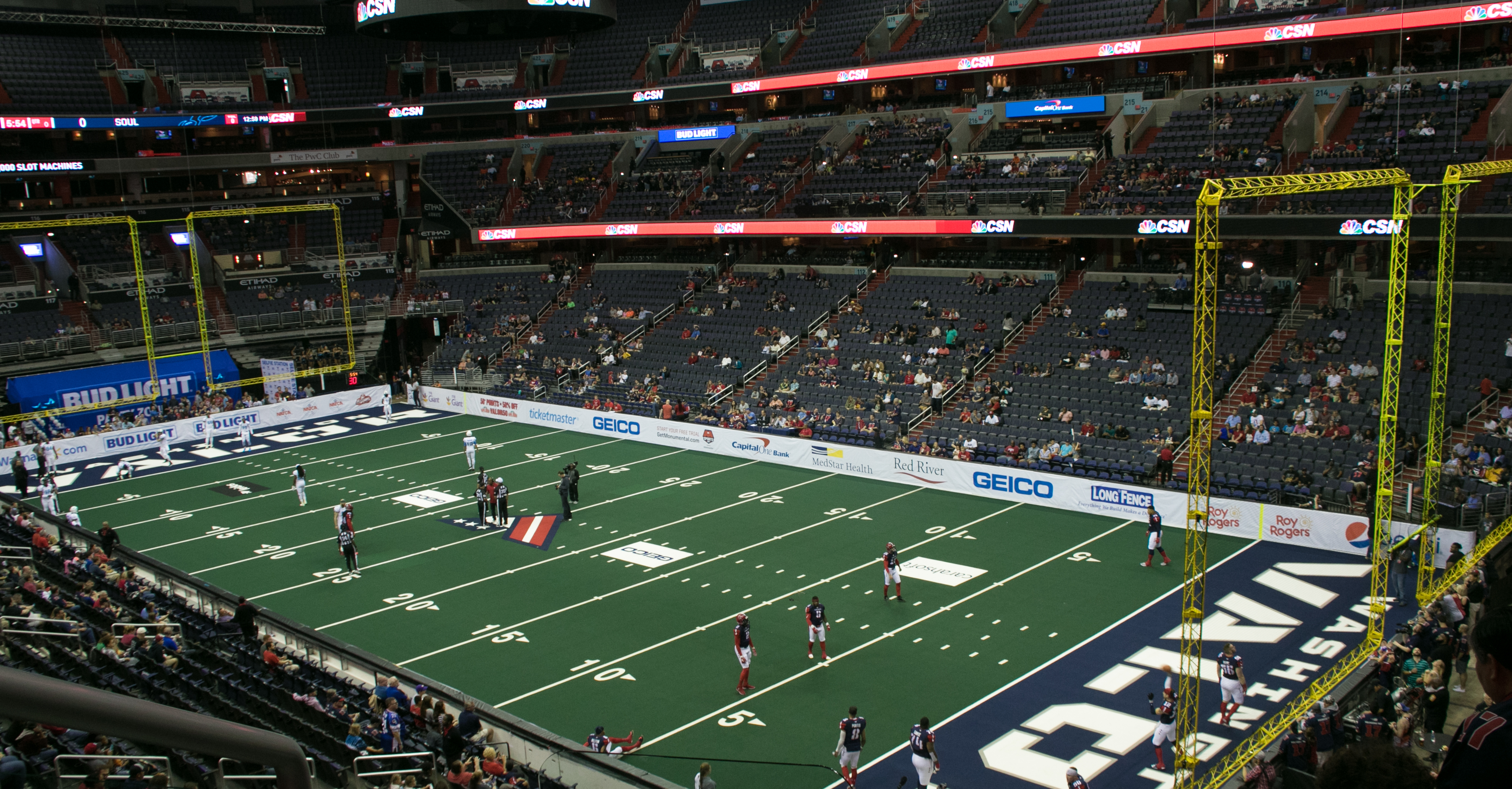
A Washington Valor game in 2017

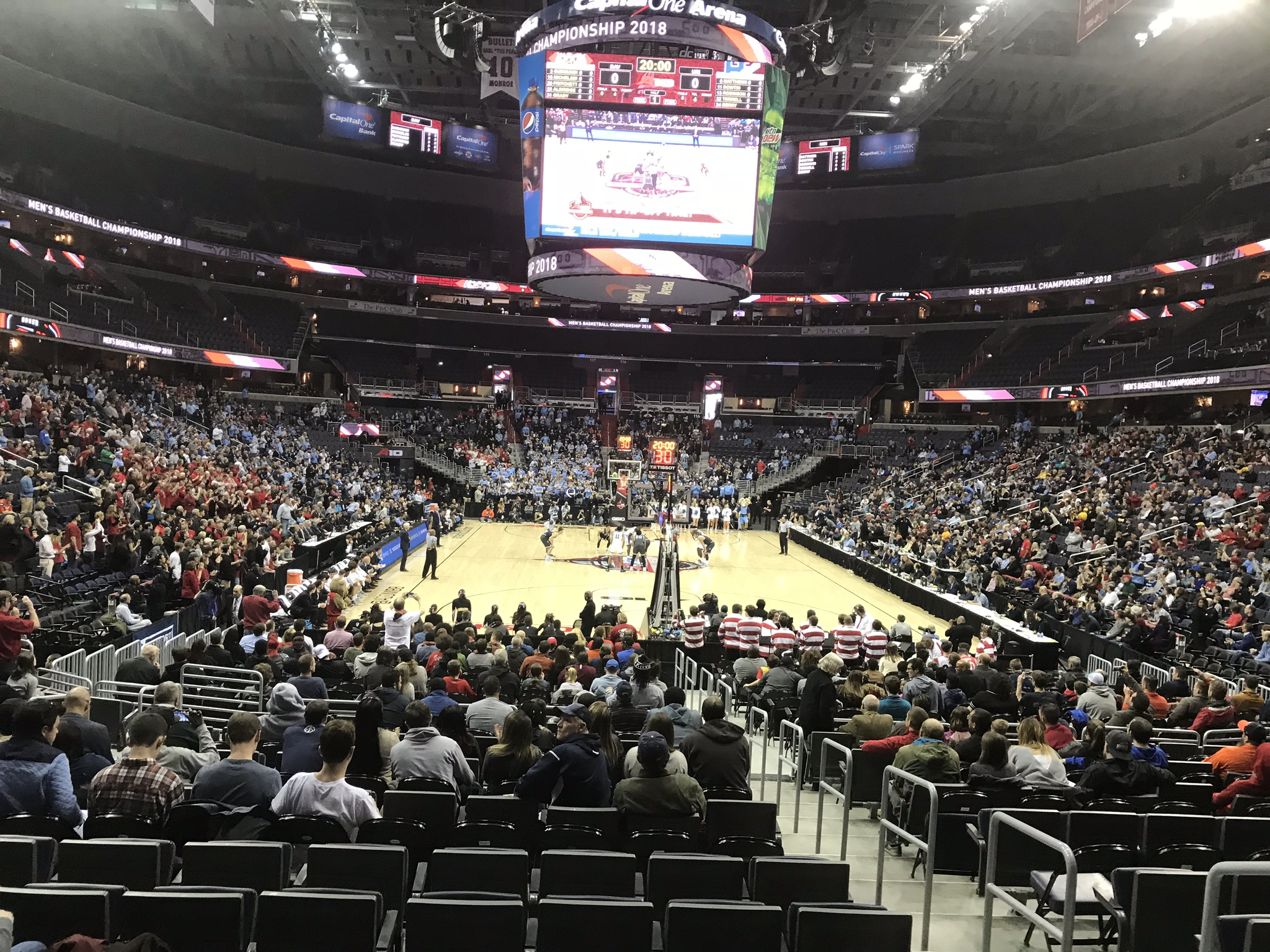
The final of the Atlantic 10 men's basketball tournament in 2018

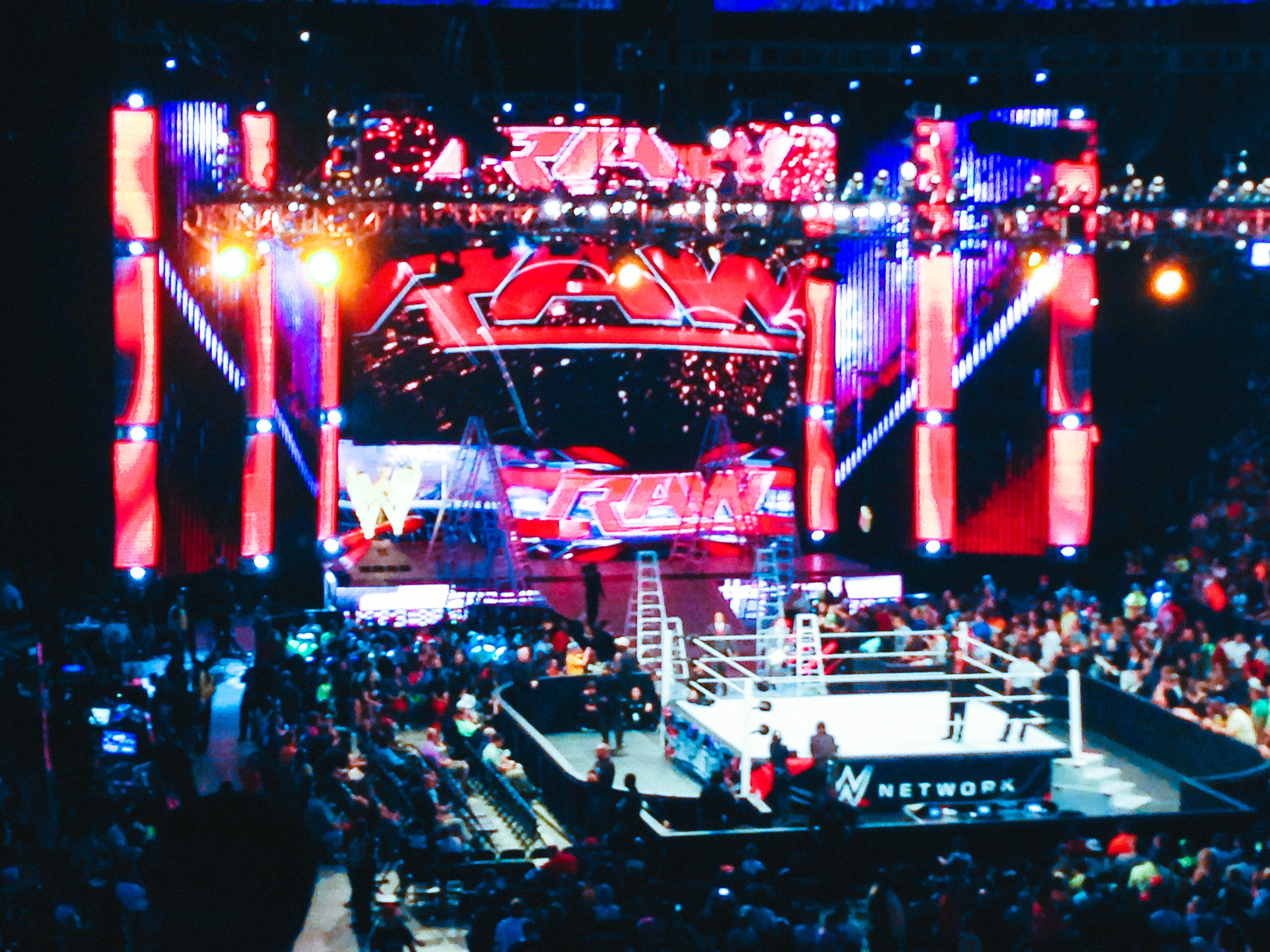
A WWE Monday Night Raw episode in 2014

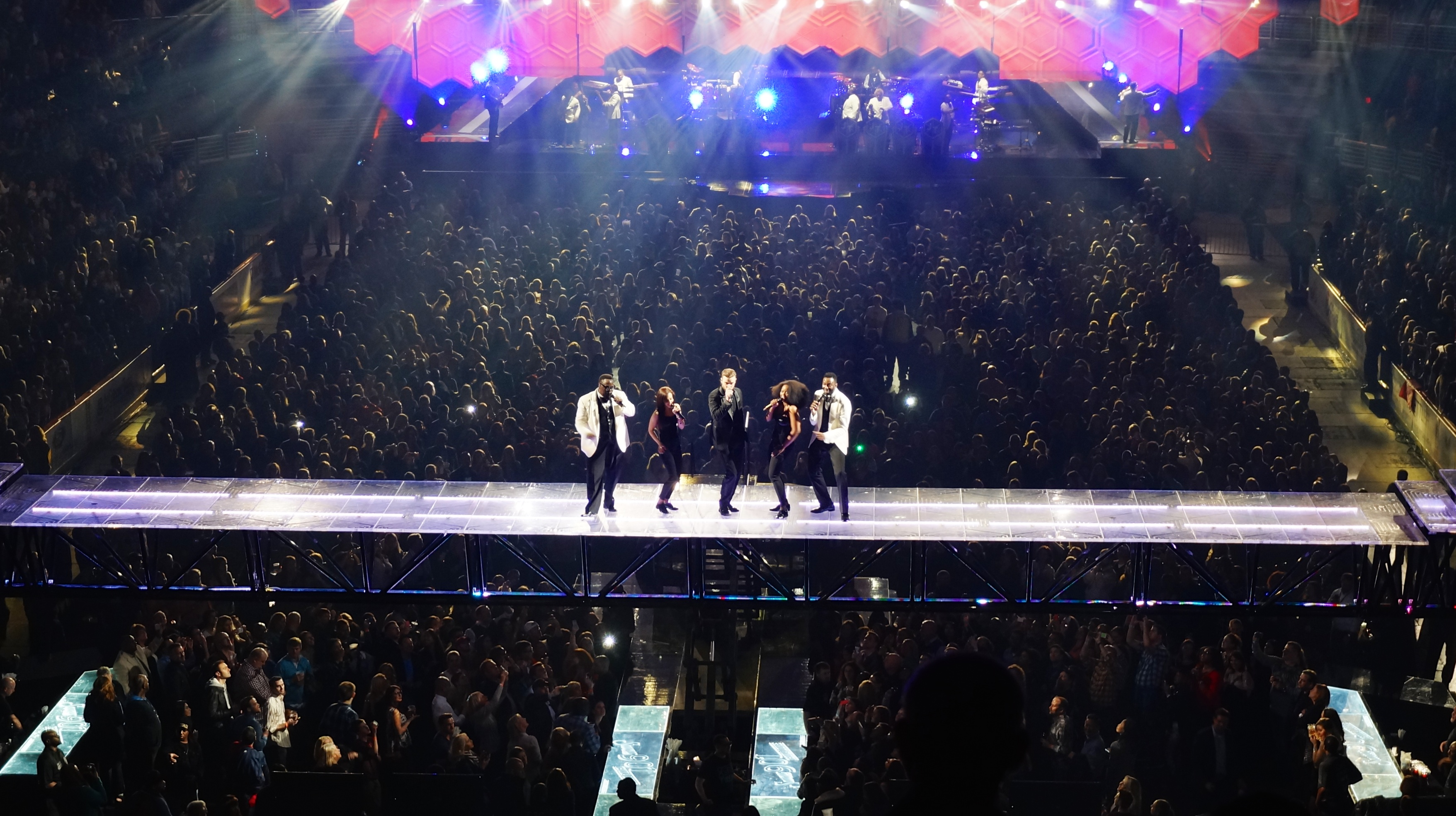
A Justin Timberlake concert in 2014

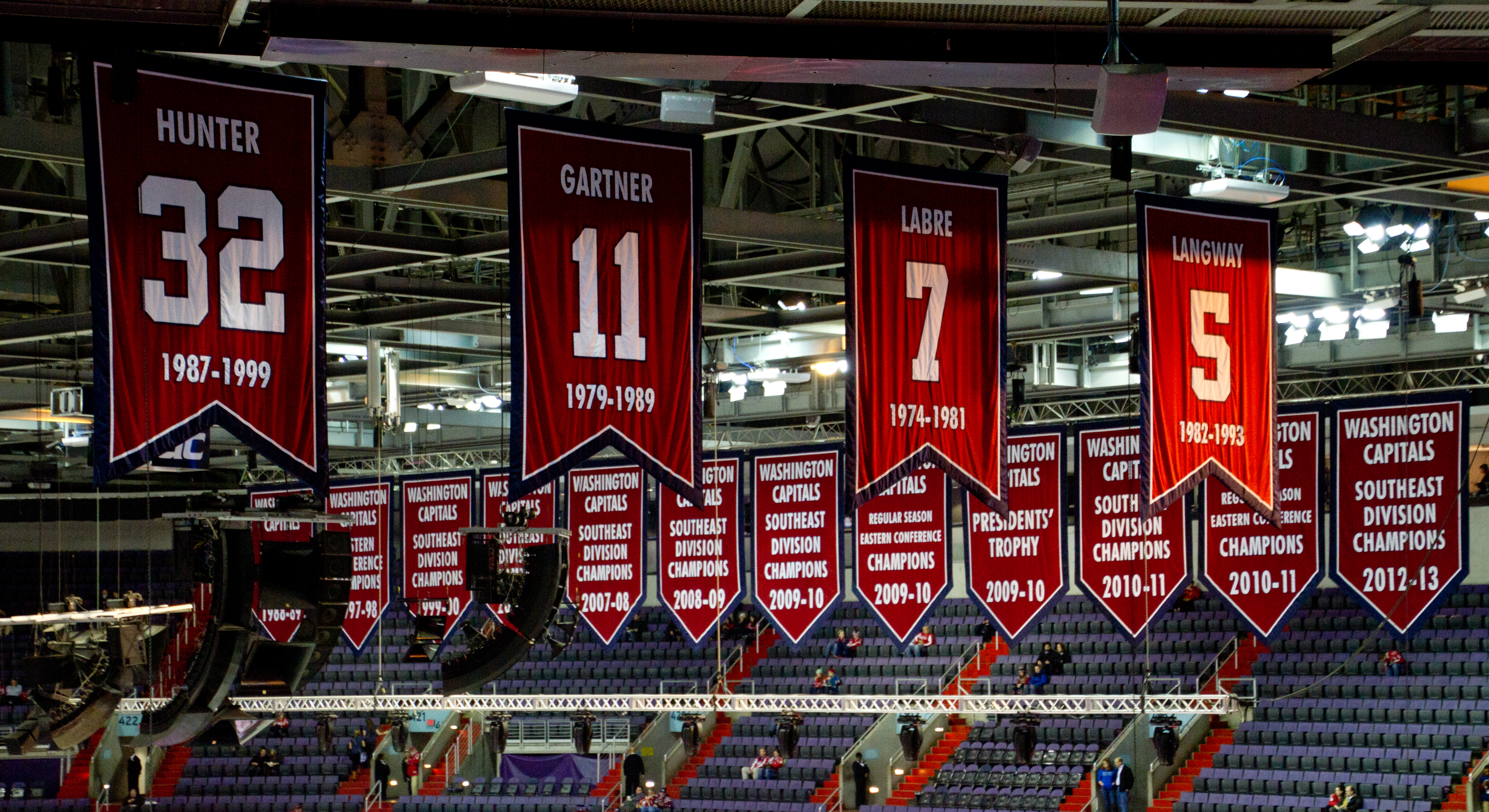
Banners of retired numbers and team accomplishments for the Capitals

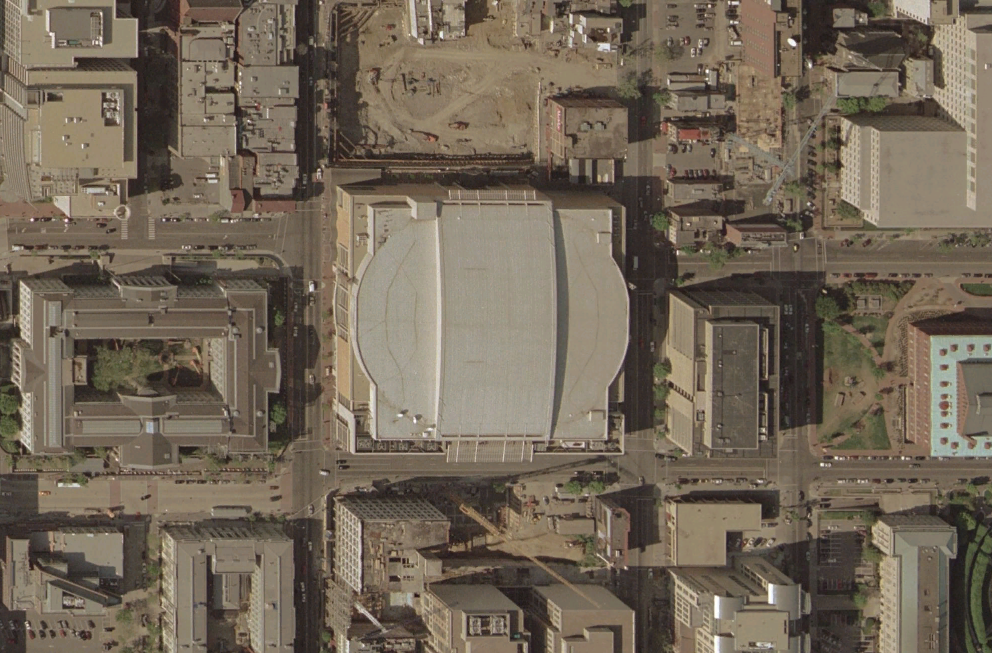
A satellite view of the arena in 2008

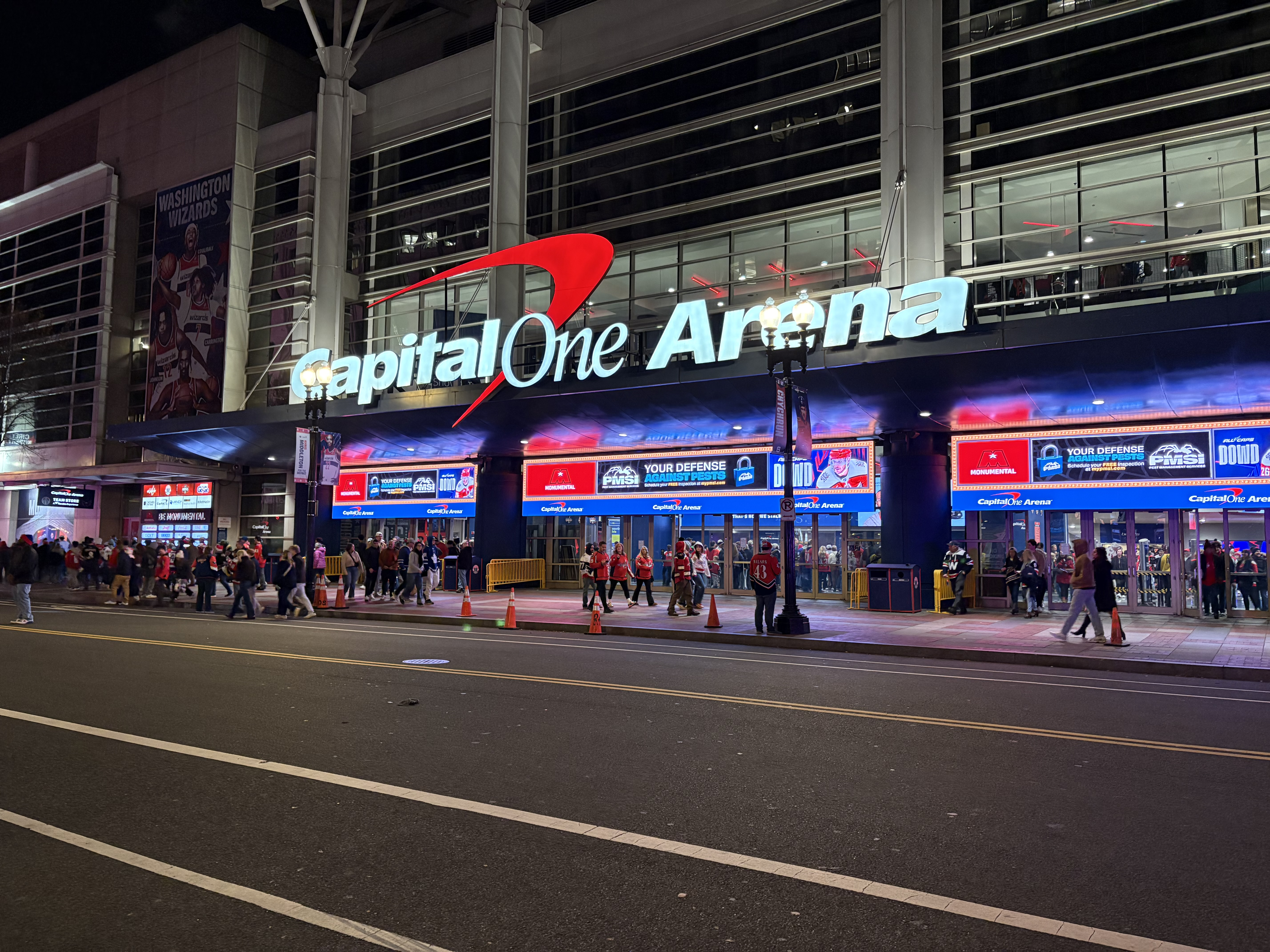
Capital One Arena at Night following a Capitals game on Black Friday 2025

== See also ==
- List of NCAA Division I basketball arenas
- List of National Hockey League arenas
- List of National Basketball Association arenas
- Sports in Washington, D.C.

Events and tenants
| Preceded by first arena | Home of the Washington Mystics; 1998–2018 | Succeeded by CareFirst Arena |
| Preceded by Capital Centre | Home of the Washington Capitals; 1997 – present | Succeeded by current |
| Preceded by Capital Centre | Home of the Washington Wizards; 1997 – present | Succeeded by current |
| Preceded by Pepsi Center; Denver, Colorado | Host of the Frozen Four; 2009 | Succeeded by Ford Field; Detroit, Michigan |
| Preceded by TD Banknorth Garden | Host of the Survivor Series; 2009 | Succeeded by American Airlines Arena |
| Preceded by U.S. Bank Arena | Host of WWE Cyber Sunday; 2007 | Succeeded by US Airways Center |
