= UST Inc. =

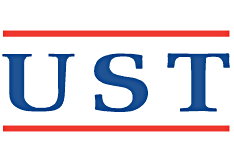
- Industry: Tobacco products
- Founded: 1986
- Defunct: 2009
- Successor: Altria
- Headquarters: Stamford, Connecticut, USA
- Key people: Murray S. Kessler, Executive Chairman, CEO, President, & COO
- Products: Smokeless tobacco, wine
- Revenue: ▲$1.48 billion USD (2007)
- Number of employees: 4,610 (2007)

UST Inc. was a holding company, the biggest producer of snuff and chewing tobacco, whose subsidiaries included U.S. Smokeless Tobacco Company and International Wine & Spirits Ltd., which in turn is a holding company of Chateau Ste. Michelle Wine Estates, a vintner of premium wines. On January 6, 2009, UST Inc. was purchased by Altria.

== History ==
United States Tobacco Co. existed before the American Tobacco Co. acquisition. UST was founded as the United States Tobacco Co. in 1911, Richmond, Va., after the US Supreme Court dissolved the American Tobacco Company trust as a monopoly and in violation of the Sherman Anti-Trust Act of 1890. Weyman-Bruton Company incorporates in 1911, acquires the United States Tobacco Company in 1921 and becomes the United States Tobacco Company in 1922, relocates from New York City to Greenwich, Connecticut in 1970, later creating the holding company in 1986. The company is incorporated in Delaware, and in the fall of 2006 announced it would move its headquarters from Greenwich, Connecticut to Stamford, Connecticut.

In 1959, United States Tobacco Company bought Circus Foods, Inc. of San Francisco, which, in 1956, acquired the Euclid Candy Company, whose candy bars were Love Nest, Full of Almonds, Red Cap and Cardinal.

It operated a video company Cabin Fever Entertainment, which was in existence for ten years from 1988 to 1998, as well as a video branch Razzmatazz Entertainment, which was in operation from 1996 to 1998 mostly to release kids videos, and feature film distributor Cabin Fever Films, which was mainly used to distribute feature films for the theatrical market. In 1998, both video subsidiaries were folded into Hallmark Home Entertainment.

In 2005, UST was among 53 entities that contributed the maximum of $250,000 to the second inauguration of President George W. Bush.

UST reported having an average of 5,111 employees in 2005. That year, UST had a $534 million profit on sales of $1.85 billion.

On November 2, 2006, UST promoted president and chief operating officer Murray S. Kessler to chief executive officer effective January 1, 2007. Vincent Gierer Jr., who had been CEO since 1993, remained chairman of the board of directors.

UST manufactures smokeless tobacco in Nashville, Tennessee; Hopkinsville, Kentucky; and Franklin Park, Illinois. It also owns vineyards in Washington state and California.

UST held 62.4 percent of the smokeless tobacco market as of the third quarter of 2006, according to an Oct. 26, 2006 report by Morningstar. UST's primary competitors include the American Snuff Company subsidiary of Reynolds American, and Swedish Match.

Effective January 6, 2009, Altria acquired all outstanding shares of UST Inc. (UST), shareholders of UST are entitled to receive $69.50 in cash without interest and less any applicable withholding tax, for each share of common stock held at the effective time of the merger.
