= Junior Hunter Finals =

Equestrian sports championship

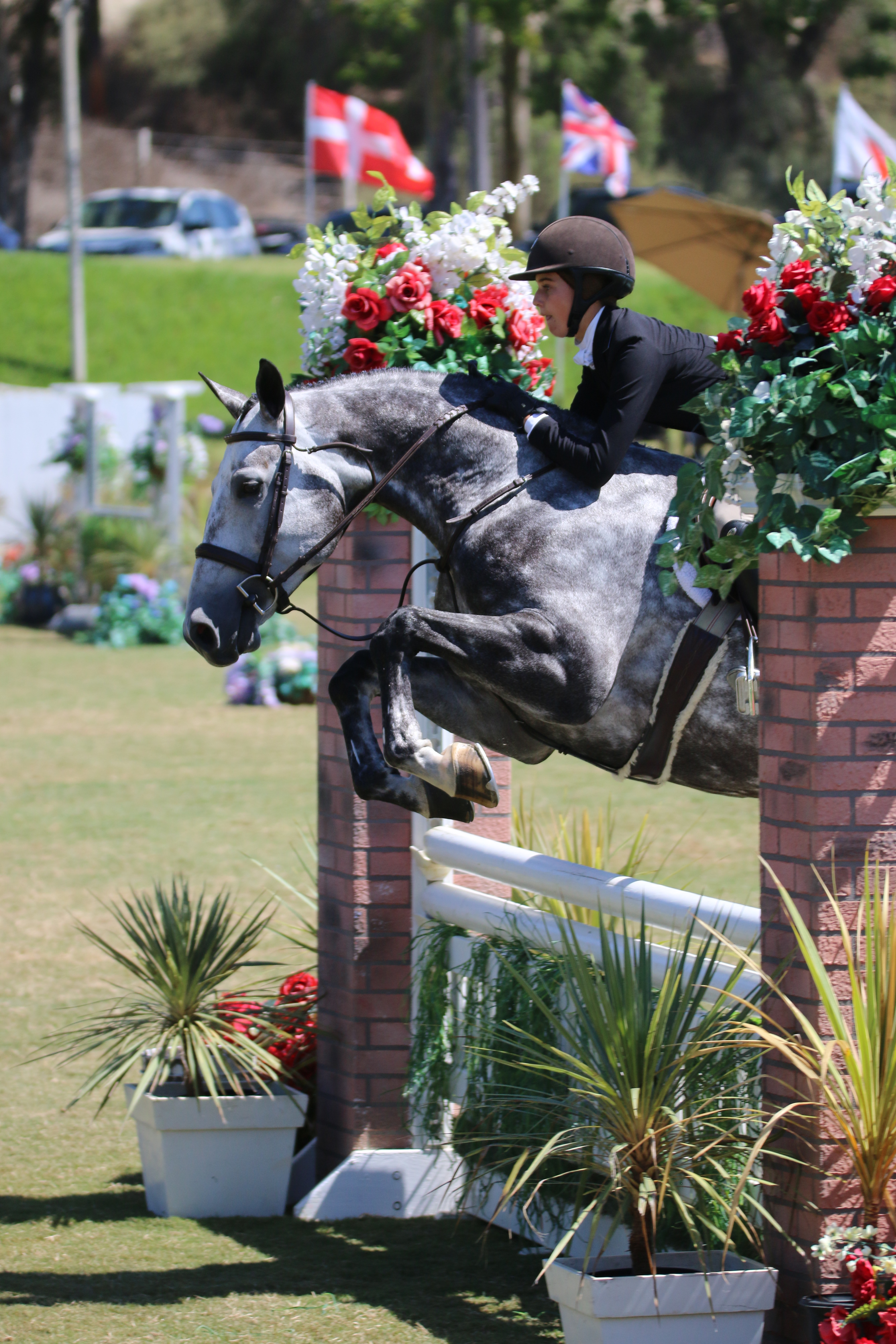
- Sanctioning body: USEF
- Held: East Coast & West Coast
- Length: Two days
- Divisions: 3'6" Small Junior 15 and under & 16-17 3'6" Large Junior 15 and under & 16-17 3'3" Small Junior 15 and under & 16-17 3'3" Large Junior 15 and under & 16-17 Hunterdon Cup
- Qualifying: Top 10 in USEF Zone or Reserve Champion or Champion in a USEF rated show
- Number of entries: 700+

Junior Hunter Finals is a two-day national championship held by the United States Equestrian Federation at two different coasts of the United States (East Coast and West Coast) in the summer of every year. It is held for qualifying Junior Hunter riders who show at either the 3'3" or 3'6" height.

== Competition ==
The USEF Junior Hunter Finals was established in 2001 as a way to showcase talent from across the country. In 2014, the 3'3" section was added due to its growing popularity throughout the states.

To show at Junior Hunter Finals, a rider must either be ranked among the top ten in their United States Equestrian Federation (USEF) Zone–which is accomplished by earning points through competition–or win either a Reserve Champion or Champion title in their respective Junior Hunter division at a USEF rated "AA" "A" "B" or "C" show. Around 700+ horses qualified in 2016 to show at either coast's finals.

Although a rider may qualify for either the 3'3" or 3'6" division, they must pick one to show in during finals if they choose to attend. A rider also must choose between the East Coast and the West Coast finals as they cannot compete in both.

The competition itself consists of three phases (similar to USEF Pony Finals): under saddle, classic round, and handy round. The under saddle is a typical hunter flat class that counts for 20% of the overall score. The classic round is a typical hunter course and the handy hunter is reminiscent of trappy sections of hunt country; each count for 40% of the overall score. Each section is awarded ribbons to tenth place, as well as the overall top ten. An overall championship is awarded for both the 3'3" and 3'6" sections.

The USHJA Gladstone Cup Equitation Classic (formerly the Hunterdon Cup) also takes place during Junior Hunter Finals. Riders qualify by being an active USHJA member and winning at least one USEF Medal, ASPCA Maclay, WIHS Equitation Overall, or USEF Show Jumping Talent Search class. The class consists of three rounds, starting with a classic hunter round that each participant completes and is given a score following the round. The top twenty riders from the classic round complete a second handy hunter round. Scores are combined for the two rounds and 4-10 riders are called back at the judges discretion for final testing. Riders switch horses and are allowed a short warm up before completing a shortened test.

== Recent Champions ==
Overall Grand Junior 3'6" Hunter Champions
Year	Location	Horse	Rider	Owner
2024	East Coast	Babylon	Paige Walkenbach	Marnell Sporthorses
2022	East Coast	Arabesque	Clara Propp	Aquitaine Equine
2022	West Coast	Aventus	Avery Glynn	Jennifer Cancellieri
2021	East Coast	Grand Remo	Kat Fuqua	Kat Fuqua
2021	West Coast	Princeton	Stella Wasserman	A.F.M. Investments
2020	East Coast	Small Occasion	Augusta Iwasaki	Elizabeth Reilly, Chris Iwasaki, Augusta Iwasaki
2020	West Coast	KT Lansini	Cameron Brown	Cameron Brown
2019	East Coast	Cleopatra's Smile	Ellie Ferrigno	Wolfstone Stables & Sales Inc.
2019	West Coast	Small Occasion	Jordan Allen	Elizabeth Reilly, Chris Iwasaki, & Augusta Iwasaki
2018	East Coast	Style	Daisy Farish	Take The High Road, LLC
2018	West Coast	Boceclli	Ava Stearns	Laura Wasserman
2017	East Coast	Di Samorano	Taylor St. Jacques	Taylor St. Jacques
2017	West Coast	Boss	Hunter Siebel	Laura Wasserman
2016	East Coast	Emma Kurtz	Caldwell	Scott Stewart
2016	West Coast	Giavanna Rinaldi	Social Hour	Laura Strasburg

Overall Grand Junior 3'3" Hunter Champions
Year	Location	Horse	Rider	Owner
2019	East Coast	Lalique	Caroline Passarelli	Elite Equines LLC
2019	West Coast	Crowd Pleaser	Grace McReynolds	Alexander Miller
2018	East Coast	Cupido Z	Nicole Dorwart	Nicole Dorwart
2018	West Coast	Harvard Grad	Alexis Sokolov	Dynamic Sporthorses LLC
2017	East Coast	Park Place	Isha Swani	Shadowfax Equestrian LLC
2017	West Coast	Maldini	Hailey Link	Star Lane Farms, LLC
2016	East Coast	Dress Balou	Devin Seek	Donald Stewart
2016	West Coast	Luisant	Stella Buckingham	Q of E Farms, LLC

Hunterdon Cup Winners
Year	Location	Rider	Horse
2019	East Coast	Madeline Schaefer	Correndo
2019	West Coast	Violet Lindemann-Barnett	Cantoblaco
2018	East Coast	Daisy Farish	Capital Hamilton
2018	West Coast	Kaitlyn Lovingfoss	Caracas 89
2017	East Coast	Taylor St. Jacques	Charisma
2017	West Coast	Augusta Iwasaki	Vanderpump
2016	East Coast	Maya Nayyar	Connaro
2016	West Coast	Kayla Lott	Vancouver
