= Washington International Horse Show =

The Washington International Horse Show (WIHS) is one of America's most elite horse shows, founded in 1958. The event took place every October for more than 20 years in the Capital One Arena in downtown Washington, D.C. for two decades. The 2022 event took place at The Show Place Arena, in neighboring Prince George's County, Maryland. The event is highlighted by international level show jumping, top show hunters, and two equitation championships. The event is currently ranked as a CSI-5*-W International show jumping event, as well as a USEF Premier Hunter and USEF 6* Jumper show.

== History ==
The Washington International Horse Show was founded in 1958 and quickly became a prestigious event for riders of all ages. Over the years, many breeds and disciplines participated including Arabians, Cutting, Dressage, Walkers, Quarter Horses and Hunter/Jumper. Additionally, the show was featured in the movie The Horse in the Gray Flannel Suit in which scenes were filmed at the show, and premiered in 1968. Due to the COVID-19 pandemic the 2020 and 2021 (62nd and 63rd) WIHS was hosted at Tryon International Equestrian Center in Mill Spring, N.C. The 2022 event returned to the DC area and was the first one in Prince George's County for more than 20 years when it took place at The Show Place Arena.

The event has been closely involved with the American presidency over the years, with the Presidential seal being given to the President of the United States Perpetual Cup by President John F. Kennedy in 1961. Honorary Chairmen have included First Ladies Jacqueline Kennedy, Lady Bird Johnson, Pat Nixon, Betty Ford, Nancy Reagan, Barbara Bush, and Laura Bush. Ambassadors and other notable persons have also been honorary chairmen.

== Event Details ==
The WIHS is a six day event that completely transforms the Capitol One Arena. The hockey rink is melted and the walls are removed, making way for carpeting and arena footing. Horse stables are erected on F and 6th streets, closing motor traffic down for the duration of the event. Horses are gathered at the nearby Prince George's Equestrian Center in Upper Marlboro, MD where they can train and are then shuttled into the city for the specific days that they will be competing.

Qualifying is required for this event. Hunter and national jumpers are selected by USEF National points acquired throughout the qualifying period, while international jumpers are selected using the FEI standard process.

Hunter classes take up much of the daytime competition, with professional and amateur divisions running on Tuesday and Wednesday, and junior and pony classes taking place on Thursday, Friday and Saturday. National championships for Child and Adult Hunter and Jumper classes are held. The WIHS Equitation Final takes place over Friday and Saturday, while the Pony Equitation Final occurs on Sunday. National and International show jumping are highlighted Thursday through Saturday in the afternoons and evening classes.

The WIHS also features the WIHS Regional Championships allowing for regional riders to compete at their home show without accumulating the points necessary to compete in the elite divisions.

== WIHS Equitation Championships ==
The WIHS Equitation Championship is one of the most prestigious equitation finals in North America. It is considered one of the four major finals in the United States alongside the USEF Medal, ASPCA Maclay, and USEF Show Jumping Talent Search. Riders compete in a two-phase qualifying class throughout the qualifying period in which points are given based on the placing and the number of people in the class. The top 30 riders on the East Coast and top 10 riders on the West Coast are invited to the championship.

The final consists of three phases. The hunter phase is a hunter-style course while the jumper phase is a more technical jumper-style course. After each phase scores are given for each rider. The top ten riders with the most points across the two phases are invited back for the third round in which riders switch horses and complete a third course. Scores are not given for the final round until after awards are announced.

The WIHS Pony Equitation Finals is one of the two major pony equitation championships alongside the USEF Pony Medal Finals. The top 25 pony riders from around the country based on points accumulated are invited to the show. Riders can choose any pony of any height to compete on. Small ponies jump at 2'3", mediums at 2'6", and large ponies jump at 3'0". The class consists of one round followed by a work-off round.

== Recent Winners ==
President's Cup Grand Prix
Year	Horse	Rider	Owner
2019	Fleurette	Laura Kraut	St. Bride's Farm
2018	Breitling LS	Beezie Madden	Elizabeth Wexner
2017	Dsarie	Beat Mändli	Grant Road Partners GmbH
2016	Ohlala	Lauren Hough	Lauren Hough
2015	Emerald	Harrie Smolders	Axel Verlooy/Eurohorse BVBA
2014	HH Carlos Z	McLain Ward	Double H Farm
2013	Blue Angel	Kent Farrington	Robin Parsky
2012	Cylana	Reed Kessler	Reed Kessler
2011	Carlo 273	Nick Skelton	Beverley Widdowson
2010	Sapphire	McLain Ward	McLain Ward & Blue Chip Bloodstock

WIHS Equitation Final
Year	Rider	Horse
2021	Dominic Gibbs	Cent 15
2020	Tessa Brown	Davide
2019	Sam Walker	Waldo
2018	Elli Yeager	Copperfield 39
2017	Taylor St. Jacques	Di Samorano
2016	Hunter Holloway	Any Given Sunday
2015	Victoria Colvin	Patrick
2014	Michael Hughes	Finnick
2013	Meredith Darst	Soldier
2012	Elizabeth Benson	San Remo VDL
2011	Chase Boggio	Massimo
2010	Lillie Keenan	Uno

Overall Grand Hunter Champion
Year	Horse	Rider	Owner
2019	Cameo	Scott Stewart	Betsee Parker
2018	Bastogne	Hunt Tosh	Ceil Wheeler
2017	Private Life	Scott Stewart	Betsee Parker
2016	Catch Me	Scott Stewart	David Gochman
2015	Boss	John French	Laura Wasserman
2014	Mindful	Kelley Farmer	Glefke and Kensel, LLC
2013	Quotable	Kelley Farmer	D. Larry Glefke & Dr. Kenneth Garber
2012	Enjoy	Scott Stewart	Rose Hill Farm
2011	Garfield	Scott Stewart	Alexandra Crown
2010	Francesca	Maggie Jayne	Pony Lane Farm
