= Devon Horse Show =

Annual horse show in Pennsylvania

Devon Horse Show and Country Fair
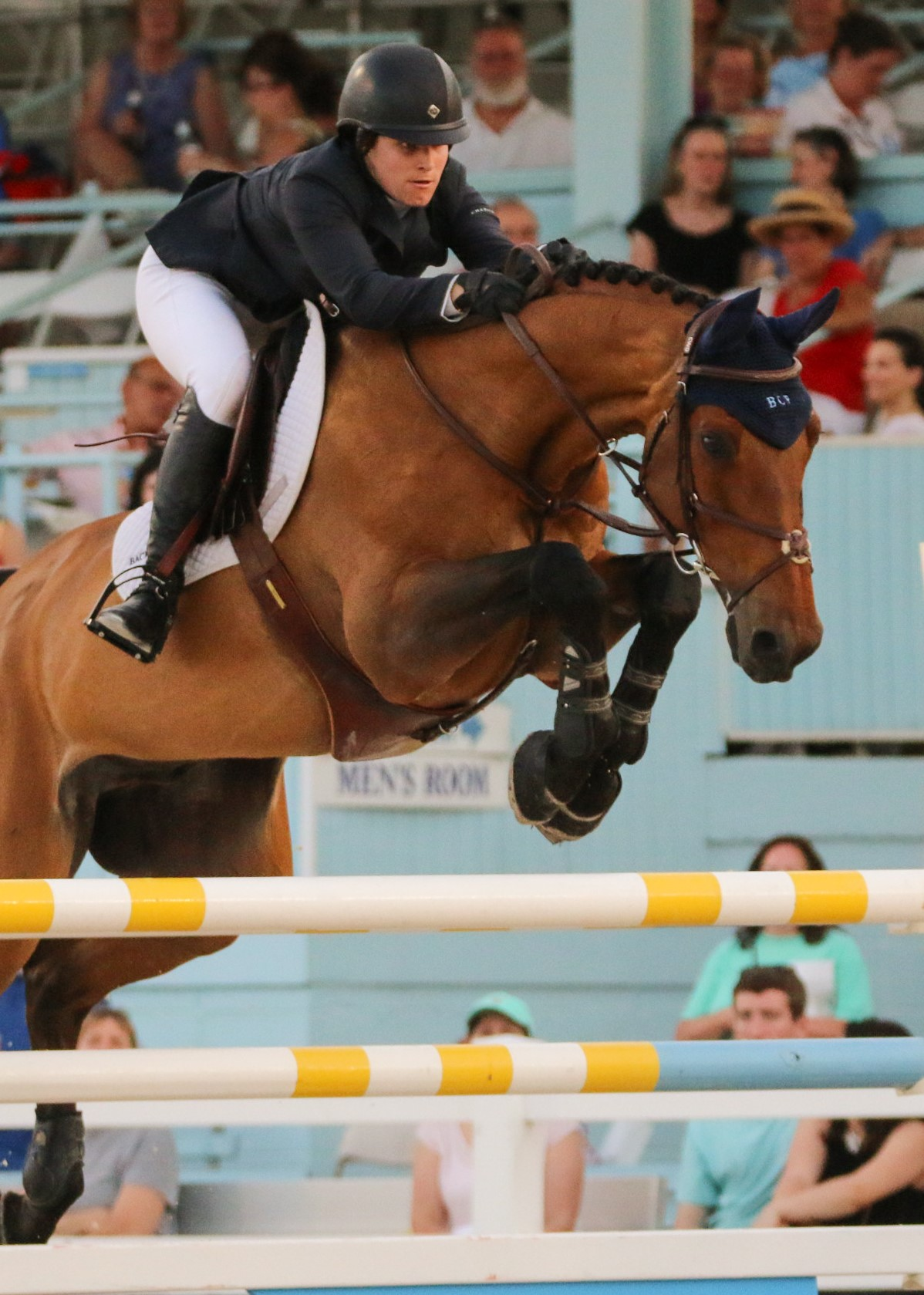
- Sydney Shulman competing at the Devon Horse Show in 2016
- Location: Devon, Pennsylvania, U.S.
- Held: Annually, late May–early June
- Inaugurated: 1896
- Breeds shown: Multi-breed
- Total purse: $1 million
- Attendance: 120,000
- Slogan: Where Champions Meet
- Website: devonhorseshow.net

The Devon Horse Show, also known as The Devon Horse Show and Country Fair, is an annual horse show held late May through early June in Devon, Pennsylvania, since 1896. It is the oldest and largest outdoor multi-breed horse show in the United States. It serves as a fundraiser for Bryn Mawr Hospital.

== Description ==
Founded in 1896, the Devon Horse Show is the oldest and largest outdoor multi-breed horse competition in the United States. The event promotes horsemanship and horse breeding for conformation, performance and speed. The original ideas and activities of the show have changed dramatically over the decades. The show attracts people from all over the world, as both competitors and spectators. The horse show features in-hand, jumpers, hunters, carriages, and gaited events. Prize money totals almost $1 million.

The Devon Horse Show grounds hosts two main rings, the Dixon Oval and the Wheeler Ring. The Dixon Oval is the main arena surrounded by the grandstands with an inscription, "Where Champions Meet," over the gateway. The smaller Wheeler Ring hosts the more populous classes such as pony breeding classes, USEF Medal, Regular Pony Hunters, as well as Local Hunters. An international dressage event, Dressage at Devon, is also held on the show grounds, taking place annually from September 26–30.

Devon features 2,000 volunteers and attracts 8,000 to 14,000 daily visitors over the course of the event, which spans ten to twelve days. The 2023 show brought 100,000 visitors to the grounds.

The horse show is live-streamed to 57 countries through the USEF Network and ESPN.

== History ==
Rider jumping in a sidesaddle class at the Devon Horse Show

The first horse show was held on July 2, 1896, as a one-day event held at the Devon Race Track and Polo Grounds. The show consisted of thirty classes, the largest class having only ten entries. The fenced-in show ring was covered with grass, and judges and officials sat in a gazebo in the center. A country fair was added to the event in 1919. The fair features vendors, a carousel, a Ferris wheel, carnival games, and other attractions. The Devon Tea Cart, which serves tea and sandwiches, is a century-old show tradition.

In October 2015, the Pennsylvania Historical and Museum Commission marked the Devon Horse Show's centennial by installing a commemorative state historical marker on East Lancaster Avenue, outside the show grounds in Devon.

== Cause ==
The show and fair are the largest fundraising event for Bryn Mawr Hospital, founded in 1893. Since 1919, Devon has raised more than $18 million for the hospital, supporting programs and services such as the emergency department, maternal-fetal medicine program, and outpatient diagnostic center. In December 2017, the Devon Country Fair delivered the fourth and final installment of a $2 million, five-year pledge to Bryn Mawr Hospital to support its modernization project.
