= Winter Equestrian Festival =

Annual horse show

Coordinates: 26.633716°N 80.273066°W

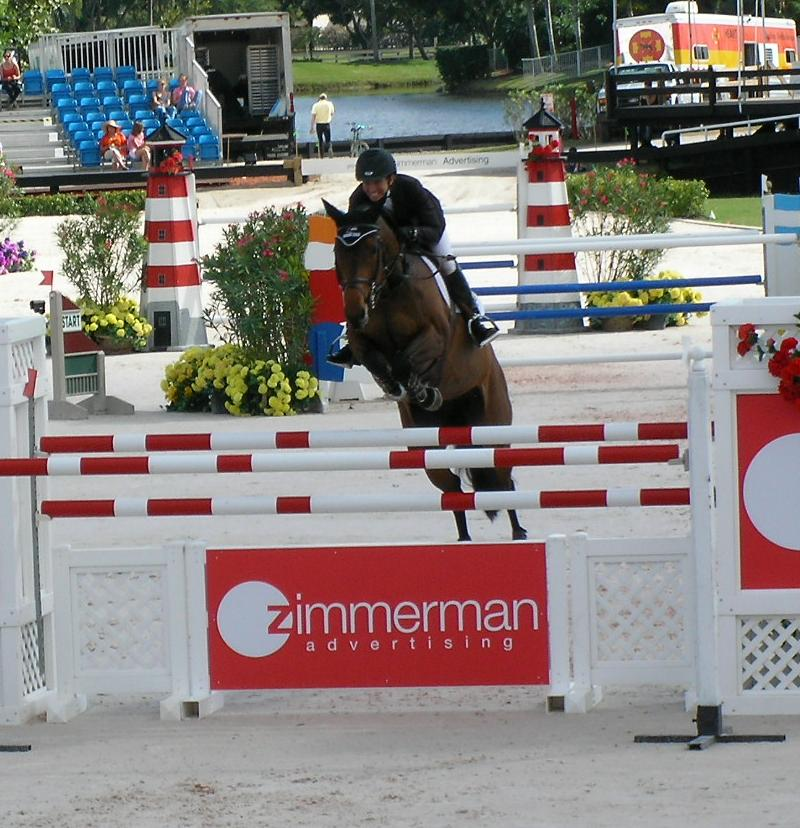
Beezie Madden and Onlight, Grand Prix competition at the FTI Winter Equestrian Festival, Wellington, Florida.

The Winter Equestrian Festival (WEF) is an annual equestrian festival running for 13 weeks between January and March in Wellington, Florida. Each of the 13 weeks is considered its own horse show, with separate competitions, as well as competitions that run throughout the festival. It is the largest and longest-running equestrian competition in the world. The Winter Equestrian Festival is known for its stunning grounds and villages, stiff competition, and wealth of its participants.

Wellington International, which hosts the equestrian festival, is a 111-acre (45 ha) venue in Wellington that consists of 18 competition arenas and 400 permanent horse stalls. The Winter Equestrian Festival (WEF) is known for its sprawling grounds and horse themed streets. Competitors and residents can access over 57 miles of trails surrounding the equestrian facility.

WEF holds competitions for children, junior, adult amateur, and professional equestrians in over 70 divisions.

WEF initially began to attract the equestrian community the 1970s, following in the footsteps of the well established International Polo Club. In 2022, WEF awarded over $13 million in prize money.

In 2026, the CEO of Wellington International, Murray S. Kessler, was accused of battery by an employee.
