= Murray S. Kessler =

American businessman

- Education: Villanova University (BS); New York University Stern School of Business (MBA)
- Occupation: Business executive
- Spouse: Sarah Kessler (m. 2019)
- Children: Reed Kessler
- Website: murraykessler.com

Murray S. Kessler is an American business executive with more than 35 years of leadership experience across the consumer goods, tobacco, and healthcare industries. He has served as president, chairman of the board, and chief executive officer of three Fortune 500 companies: UST Inc., Lorillard, Inc., and Perrigo Company plc. He also served as the 14th president of the United States Equestrian Federation (USEF), the national governing body for equestrian sports in the United States, from January 2017 to January 2021.

== Early life and education ==
Kessler received a Bachelor of Science in Business Administration from Villanova University and a Master of Business Administration in marketing and finance from the New York University Stern School of Business.

== Career ==
=== Early career ===
Kessler began his career in consumer packaged goods, accumulating more than 18 years of experience across several well-known companies. He held roles at Campbell's (NYSE: CPB) and Clorox (NYSE: CLX). Specifically, he served as vice president of sales and marketing of Pace Foods, a division of Campbell Soup, from September 1995 to October 1997, and as general manager of the Swanson Division of Campbell Soup from October 1997 to March 1998. He subsequently served as vice president of Pinnacle Foods (NYSE: PF) from March 1998 to December 1999, and held positions at Vlasic Foods International.

=== UST Inc. / Altria ===
Kessler joined UST Inc. in April 2000 as President of the U.S. Smokeless Tobacco Company. He subsequently served as president and chief operating officer from November 2005 to December 2006, and as president and chief executive officer from January 2007 to 2009. He additionally served as chairman of UST from 2008 to 2009. Following the acquisition of UST by Altria (NYSE: MO), Kessler served as vice chair of Altria (formerly Philip Morris Companies Inc.) from 2009 to 2010.

=== Lorillard, Inc. ===
In September 2010, Kessler joined Lorillard, Inc. as president and chief executive officer and member of its board of directors, succeeding Martin L. Orlowsky. He was appointed chairman of the board effective January 1, 2011. During his tenure, Lorillard was acquired by Reynolds American in 2015, at which point Kessler served as a director on the Reynolds American board of directors.

=== Perrigo Company plc ===
On October 8, 2018, Kessler was appointed president, chief executive officer, and member of the board of directors of Perrigo Company plc (NYSE: PRGO), a leading global provider of over-the-counter consumer self-care products. He was brought in to lead the company's strategic transformation from a pharmaceutical-focused business to a pure-play consumer self-care company. During his tenure, Kessler oversaw fourteen merger and acquisition transactions, the near-complete elimination of a significant tax and legal overhang, and the repositioning of Perrigo's global portfolio around consumer-driven OTC healthcare products.

On May 9, 2023, Kessler announced his intention to retire as president and CEO, with an effective date of July 31, 2023, after nearly five years leading the company. In a statement, he noted: "After 18 years as a public company CEO, I have decided that this is the right time for me to retire." Perrigo Board Chairman Orlando D. Ashford credited Kessler with orchestrating the company's transformation into a diversified consumer self-care organization.

== United States Equestrian Federation ==
On June 21, 2016, Kessler was elected as the 14th President of the United States Equestrian Federation (USEF) by the USEF Board of Directors at its Mid-Year Meeting in Gladstone, New Jersey, succeeding Chrystine Tauber. He officially took office at the USEF Annual Meeting in January 2017. The position was an unpaid volunteer role. During his tenure, Kessler oversaw significant organizational changes including membership growth from approximately 82,000 to more than 100,000 members, the implementation of Safe Sport compliance programs, the relocation of USEF headquarters, and an improved performance by U.S. teams in international competition. In January 2020, Kessler announced he would not seek a second term, citing his concurrent professional commitments as CEO of Perrigo. His term concluded in January 2021.

== Wellington International ==
In October 2024, Kessler was appointed chief executive officer of Equestrian Sports Production, LLC and its affiliated entities, which operate Wellington International, a premier equestrian competition venue in Wellington, Florida.

In March 2026, Wellington International announced the termination of Kessler from his roles at the organization following an internal investigation. Kessler denied the allegations underlying the investigation. His attorney stated: "Murray Kessler strongly denies the allegations against him and will vigorously defend his name and reputation." No criminal charges were filed in connection with the matter.

== Personal life ==
Kessler has been an active equestrian competitor for more than four decades, competing in the hunter/jumper disciplines at the national level. His daughter, Reed Kessler, represented the United States as a show jumper at the 2012 London Olympic Games, becoming the youngest equestrian to compete at that edition of the Games. Kessler married Sarah Kessler in 2019.
