= USEF Pony Finals =

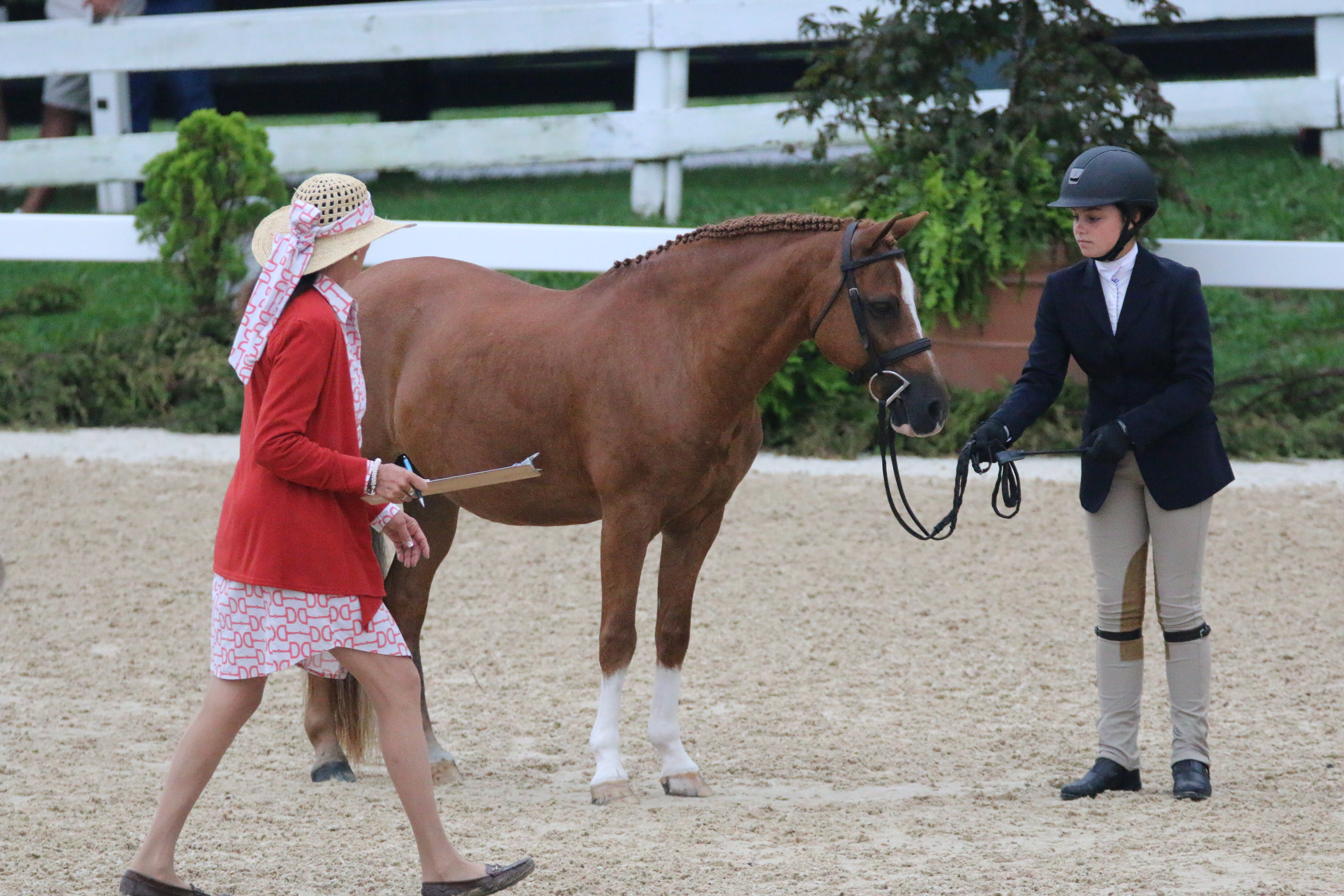
- Sanctioning body: United States Equestrian Federation
- Location: Kentucky Horse Park in Lexington, KY
- Held: August
- Sponsors: Marshall & Sterling
- Number of entries: 600+

The United States Equestrian Federation Pony Finals is an annual championship for pony hunters, jumpers, and equitation. The event takes place over six days and is typically held at the Kentucky Horse Park in Lexington, KY. More than 600 ponies compete at the championship every year.

== History ==
The American Horse Show Association created the hunter pony division in 1951, and shortly after, the International Pony Competition was created for American ponies to compete against British counterparts. The first American Pony Finals took place in 1967 in Deep Run, Virginia after the dissolution of the International Pony Competition. The first event featured only two divisions: the small pony hunters (ponies 12.2 hands and under) and large pony hunters (ponies 12.2-14.2 hands). In 1976, the medium pony division was created for ponies 12.2-13.2 hands in height, shifting large ponies to being 13.2-14.2 hands. The green pony hunter division was created in 1978, and was further divided into two sections (small/medium and large) in 1983.

Over the years the event has always taken place every August and has moved locations several times. It was held five times at the Fairfield County Hunt Club in Connecticut, and also was hosted at the Lamplight Equestrian Center in Wayne, Illinois, the Virginia Horse Center, and The Andrews Osborne Academy in Willoughby, Ohio before finding its permanent home at the Kentucky Horse Park in 2005.

Many top American riders have competed and won at Pony Finals, including Gregory Best in 1975, Lauren Hough in 1985, and Reed Kessler in 2006.

== Competition ==
Three main sub-divisions take place at Pony Finals: hunters, jumpers and the pony medal. Each require qualification and have a different format.

=== Hunter Divisions ===
There are six hunter divisions that compete separately, although all have the same format and qualifying requirements. The divisions include a regular and green division for each of the three heights (small, medium, and large). The green division is for ponies in their first year competing at the pony hunter height and are judged separately from the regular ponies. Ponies can only compete in one hunter division at the finals. To qualify, ponies must be registered with both the USEF and USHJA and have a current measurement card that states their height, which determines which height they will compete as. They also must receive champion or reserve champion at an "A" or "AA" rated USEF show within the qualifying period. Ponies who were champion the previous year at Pony Finals are automatically qualified for the championship.

Each division is made up of three phases: the model, the under saddle, and the over fences. The model is judged in-hand, with the rider presenting the ponies from the ground and where the pony's conformation, way of moving, and soundness is judged. The under saddle is a standard flat class where ponies are judged on their movement, manners, and soundness at the walk, trot, and canter. Ponies are divided into sections of up to 12 for both the model and under saddle phases. Both phases make up 25% each of the total score for the overall competition. The over fences phase is the final phase where ponies are judged on performance and soundness over a course of jumps, and makes up 50% of the overall score. Ribbons are given through 20th place for each phase, as well as the overall championship. Overall grand championships are given to the pony with the highest total overall score across the three regular divisions and the three green divisions.

Riders may compete only one pony per division and the same rider must ride the pony in all three phases. Riders may not be over the age of 12 to ride a regular small pony, or over the age of 14 to ride a regular medium pony. All pony riders must be under the age of 18 to compete on ponies. Green ponies of any height may be ridden by any junior under age 18.

=== Jumper Championship ===
The USEF Pony Jumper Championships includes several rounds of competition similar to the format of senior championship events. On Thursday, all riders compete in an individual welcome class at a maximum height of 1.05m, followed by two identical rounds on Friday that makes up the team championship, and an individual championship class on Saturday where fences can reach a maximum height of 1.15m. Those that do not qualify for the individual final may compete in the farewell class on Saturday where fences are up to 1.05m.

Riders qualify their ponies through either pony jumper classes or children's jumper classes at USEF rated shows. Individual and team medals are given out for the competition.

=== Pony Medal Finals ===
Pony Medal riders qualify for the finals by earning 30 points in qualifying classes during the qualifying period. Points are awarded for the top three placings and the exact number of points is based on the number of riders entered in the class.

The championship is made up of two rounds and an optional test. All riders compete in the first round and up to 30 are called back to complete a second round. Further testing is at the judge's discretion and aids in determining the winner. The rider may choose any pony to compete on in the final, although the same age rules as the hunter divisions apply.

== Recent Champions ==
Overall Grand Pony Hunter Champion
Year	Pony	Rider	Owner
2023	Celebration	Kathryn Padilla	Highland Farm, LLC
2022	Goldmark	Aundrea Hillyard	Take 3 LLC
2021	D’Artagnan	Emma Dyson	Simply Ponies, LLC
2019	Bit of Love	Maddie Tosh	Betsee Parker
2018	Brighton	Kat Fuqua	Kat Fuqua
2017	News Flash	Augusta Iwasaki	Tessa Downey
2016	Storyteller	Mimi Gochman	Fair Play Farm
2015	Bit of Laughter	Augusta Iwasaki	Chris Iwasaki, Elizabeth Reilly, & Augusta Iwasaki
2014	Blueberry Hill	Natalie Jayne	Natalie Jayne
2013	Sassafras Creek	Daisy Farish	Redfield Farm
2012	Hi Lite	Madeline Schaefer	Madeline Schaefer
2011	Enchanted Forest	Meredith Darst	Betsee Parker
2010	For The Laughter	Victoria Colvin	Betsee Parker

Individual Gold Pony Jumper
Year	Pony	Rider	Owner
2023	Air Force One	Reagan Voxman	Reagan Voxman
2022	Magic Dragon	Aundrea Hillyard	Hidden Ridge
2021	Miracles Happen	Alexis Bauman	Alexis Bauman
2019	Sky Miles	Hallie Rush	Hallie Rush
2018	The Girl Next Door	Zacko Hardin	Patty Arnett
2017	Spoot De La Jourlais	Tabitha Okitsu	Tabitha Okitsu
2016	Wishlea Star Dasher	Bailey Doloff	Brigid McMurtie
2015	Knock My Sox Off	Elizabeth McDougald	Elizabeth McDougald
2014	Bluebelle	Genevieve Munson	Carlie Beisel
2013	American Hero	Cooper Dean	Cooper Dean
2012	Larger Than Life	Keely Laughlin	Keely Laughlin
2011	The Waterboy	Julia Curtis	Julia Curtis
2010	Set Sail	Sydney Shulman	Sydney Shulman

Pony Medal Finals Champion
Year	Rider	Pony
2023	Samantha Smith	Sports Illustrated
2022	Chandler Wilks	Orchard Hills Bouie
2021	Olivia Sweetnam	On Your Mark
2019	Kat Fuqua	Prestige
2018	Tessa Downey	Hallelujah
2017	Ada Catherine Hays	Center Field
2016	Caroline Passarelli	News Flash
2015	Sophie Gochman	Rico Suave
2014	Taylor St. Jacques	Happy Feet
2013	Olivia Woodson	Butterfly Kisses
2012	Lucy Deslauriers	Center Field
2011	Madison Goetzmann	Denmark
2010	Isabella Caccamise	Better Than Good
