= Reed Kessler =

Former American show jumper

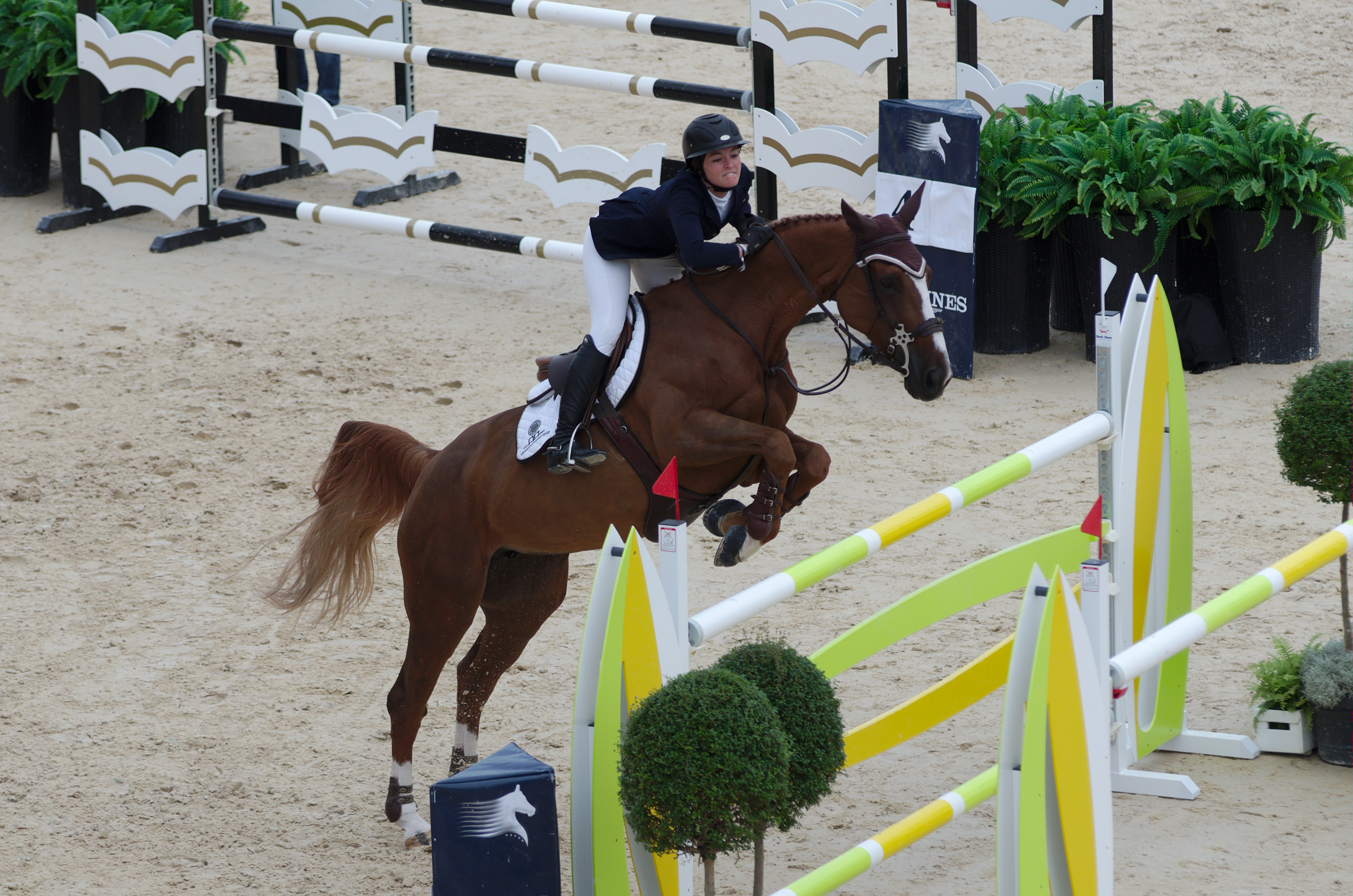
- Reed Kessler and Soraya de l'Obstination

Personal information
- Discipline: Show Jumping
- Born: July 9, 1994 (age 32); Armonk, New York, U.S.
- Height: 5 ft 5 in (1.65 m)
- Weight: 119 lb (54 kg; 8 st 7 lb)

Reed Catherine Kessler (born July 9, 1994) is a former American show jumping competitor previously based in Europe. At 18 years old, Kessler qualified for the 2012 London Olympics, becoming at the time, the youngest rider to compete in show jumping at the Olympic Games. In 2013, she won the Longines Rising Star Award after winning the 2012 USEF National Jumping title and won the 2013 ATCO Power Queen Elizabeth II Cup at Spruce Meadows.

== Personal life ==
She is the daughter of Murray Kessler, former President of the United States Equestrian Federation and former CEO of Lorillard Tobacco Company.

After competing in the Olympics, she continued showjumping for several years. Kessler's last international showjumping competition was in 2018. Kessler later pursued studies at Columbia University's School of International and Public Affairs. She received a master's degree in International Security Policy, Conflict Resolution, and Russia and the Post-Soviet States.

After graduate school, Kessler worked for the Ronald Reagan Institute, where she served as Associate Director of Policy from 2023 to 2025. She now works as a research assistant for the House Armed Services Committee.
