= Dover Harbor =

Dover Harbor may refer to:

- Dover Harbor (Pullman car), a passenger railroad car
- Port of Dover, a cross-channel port situated in Dover, Kent, south-east England
