= Private car =

Private car may refer to:

- A class of small motor vehicle (e.g. for car registration, driving licence)
- Private railroad car
