= McCormick-Stillman Railroad Park =

Railway museum in Maricopa County, Arizona

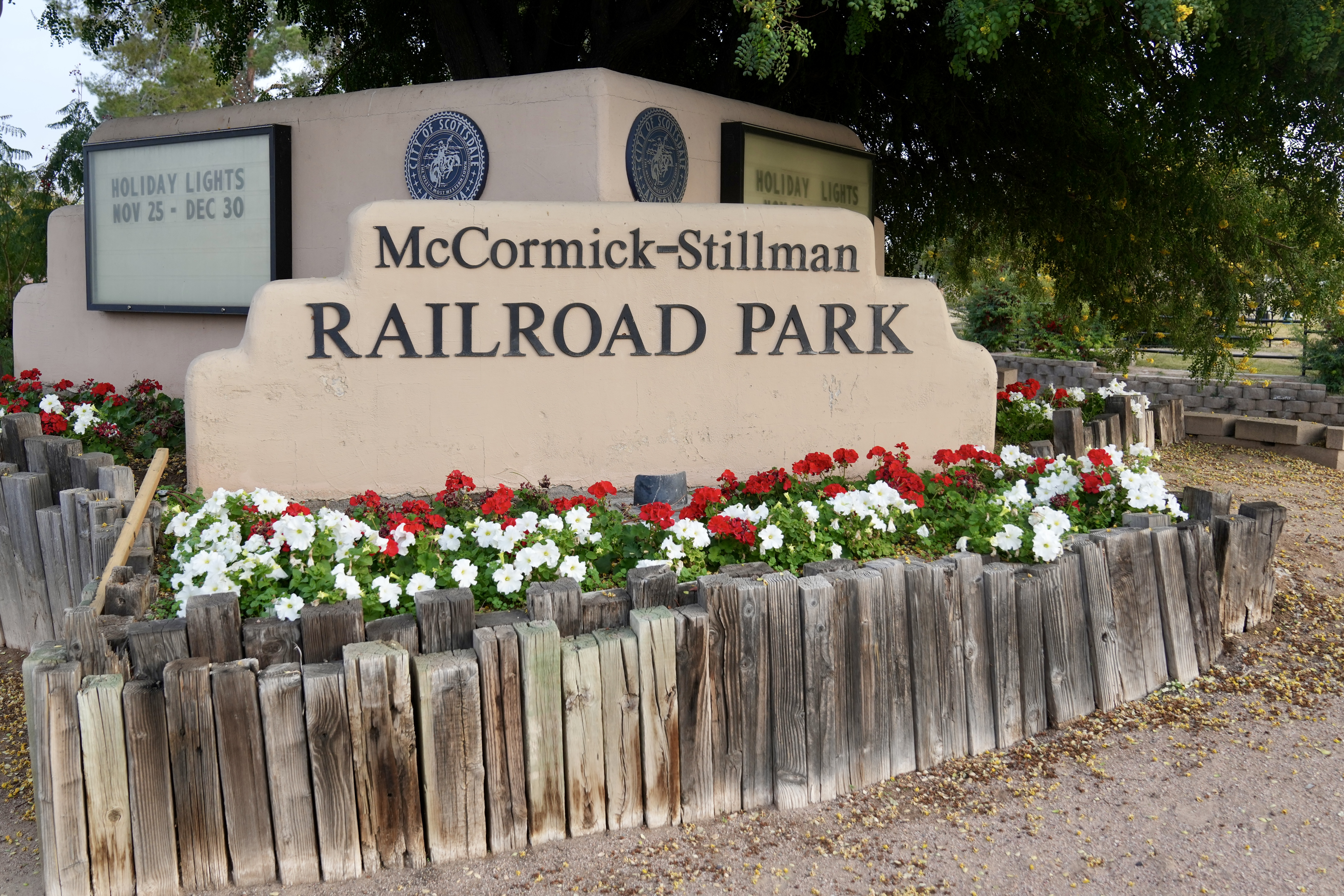
- McCornick-Stillman Railroad Park entrance
- Interactive map of McCormick-Stillman Railroad Park
- Location: Scottsdale, Arizona
- Coordinates: 33°32′15″N 111°55′24″W
- Area: 30-acre (12 ha).
- Operator: City of Scottsdale
- Website: www.therailroadpark.com

McCormick-Stillman Railroad Park is a 30-acre (12 ha) railroad park located in Scottsdale, Arizona. It features a 15 in (381 mm) gauge railroad, a Magma Arizona Railroad locomotive, a railroad museum, three model railroad clubs and a 7 1/2 in (190.5 mm) gauge live steam railroad.

== History ==
In 1967, the Fowler McCormicks donated 100 acres (40 ha) of McCormick Ranch to the City of Scottsdale stipulating that it be used as a park for all people to enjoy. The son of Anne and James A. Stillman, Guy Stillman, assembled his 15 in (381 mm) gauge narrow gauge railroad replica in the property. He called it the "Paradise & Pacific Railroad" and was offered to the city in 1971. The U.S. Marines, with the backing of Senator Barry Goldwater, contributed to the railroad's expansion by supplying manpower for the laying of tracks. The park officially opened on October 4, 1975. Originally named McCormick Railroad Park, it was renamed McCormick-Stillman Railroad Park in 1996 in recognition of its founder, Guy Stillman.

The City of Scottsdale sold 60 acres (24 ha) of the donated land to a developer several years ago.

== Attractions ==
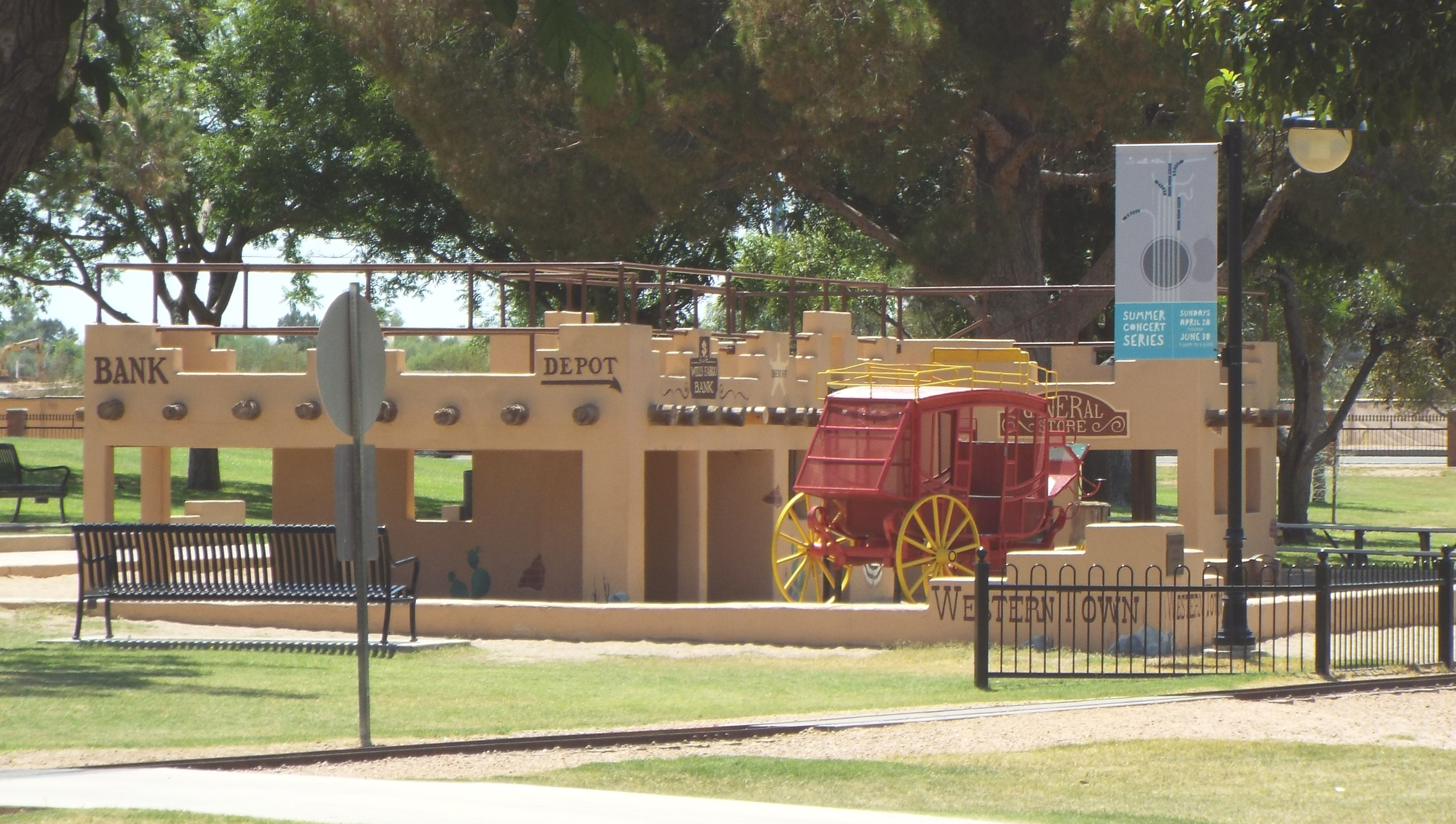
Children's Western Town Playground

- Paradise & Pacific Railroad: Created by Stillman, the Paradise & Pacific Railroad is the oldest and the first attraction to operate in the park. This 15 in (381 mm) gauge ridable miniature railway has a route of 3,800 feet (1,158 m) of track and 1,400 feet (427 m) of sidetrack, including two trestles, a tunnel, 2 water tanks, loading platform, turntable, two crossing signals and an extensive train shed and workshop. The railroad has three steam locomotives (two operational), three diesel locomotives, two cabooses, a coach car, a trolley car (in the model RR building), three stock cars and a large number of gondola cars.
- Charro Carrousel: This merry-go-round was built in 1950 by The Allan Herschell Company and was purchased and restored by the Scottsdale Railroad & Mechanical Society.
- Playgrounds: The park has two children's playgrounds, one of them Southwestern-themed in an adobe construction.
- Statue of Bil Keane: Mr Keane was the creator of the newspaper comic The Family Circus.

== Exhibits ==
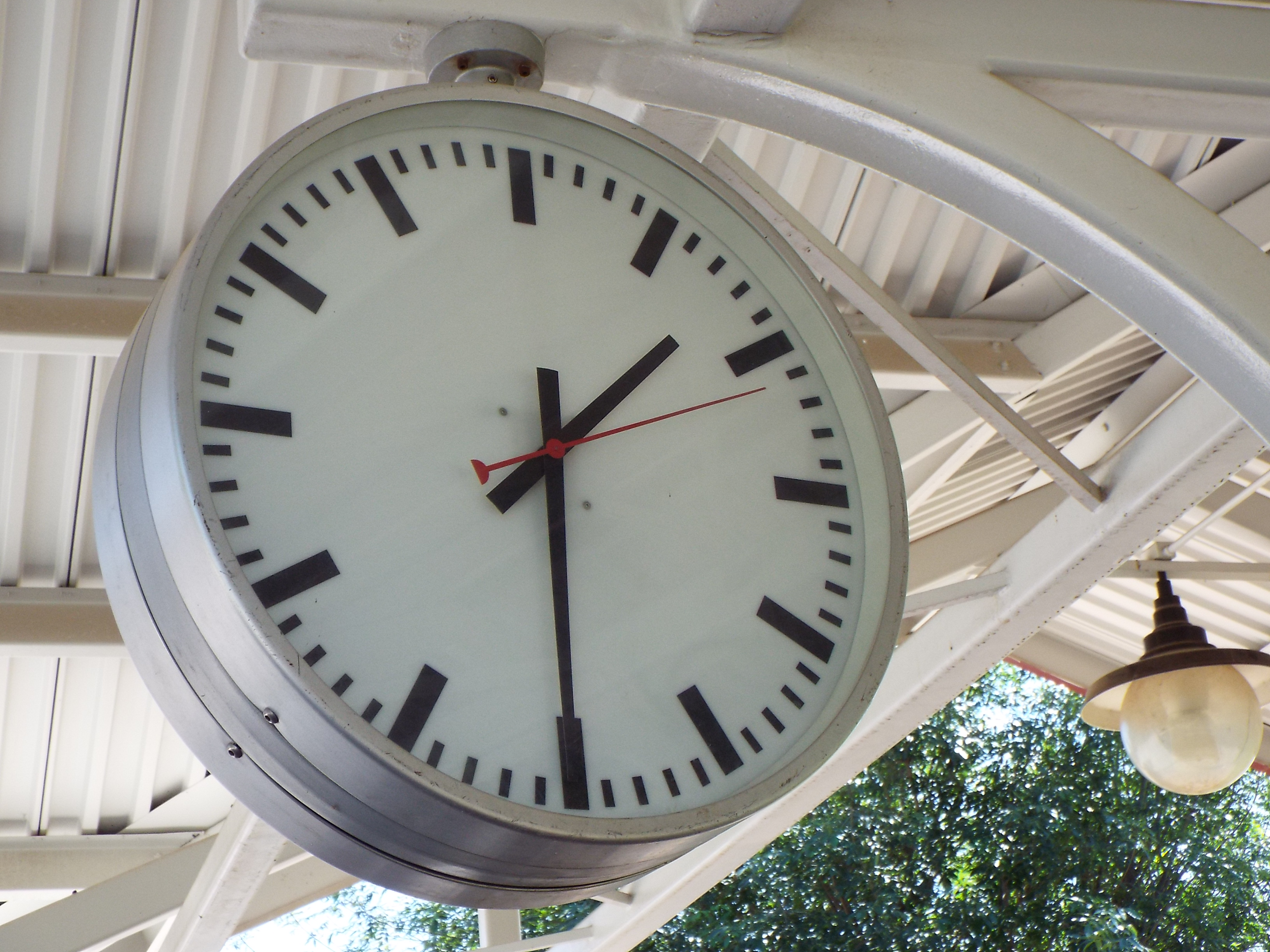
The Swiss Railway Clock

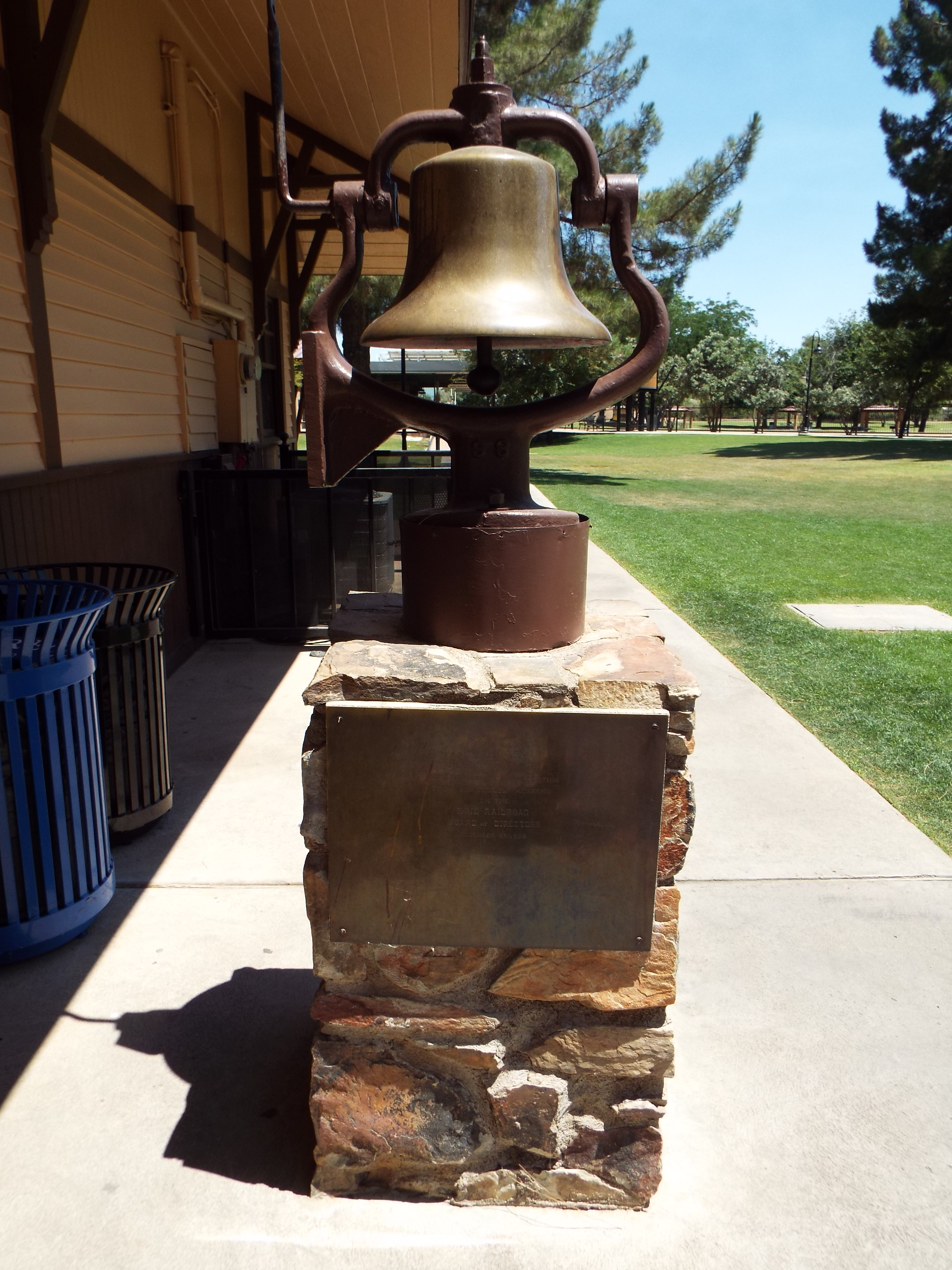
Antique Railroad Bell

- Magma Arizona Railroad Engine #6: This locomotive was built in 1907 by the Baldwin Locomotive Works and operated in the Magma Arizona Railroad for 54 years. It was purchased by the Scottsdale Railroad & Mechanical Society in 1977 and is the only Arizona & New Mexico engine remaining in Arizona.
- Railroad Museum
- Roald Amundsen Pullman car: Donated to the Scottsdale Railroad and Mechanical Society by Mr. and Mrs. Franz Talley, it is one of six cars built by the Pullman Company in 1928. It was constructed at a cost of $205,000 and used by Presidents Herbert Hoover, Franklin Roosevelt, Harry Truman, and Dwight Eisenhower. President Eisenhower used the car exclusively during the whistle-stop campaign in 1952. It was on this car on August 18, 1940, that President Roosevelt and Canadian Prime Minister W.L. McKenzie King met and mutually agreed to the Ogdensberg Declaration, a declaration that provided for the joint defense of North America in the event of foreign invasion. That was the beginning of the North American Air Defense, also known as N.O.R.A.D. It was donated to the park in 1971.
- The Swiss Railway Clock: The clock was donated to the McCormick-Stillman Railroad Park by the City of Interlaken, Switzerland. This was done in commemoration of the sister cities partnership of the cities of Interlaken and Scottsdale. The Swiss Railway Clock was designed in 1944 by Hans Hilfiker and was used by the Swiss federal Railways as a station clock.
- Gabe Brooks Machine Shop: Built in 1930 by Gabe Brooks, who was considered the finest machinist in the United States during World War II. It still contains original machining equipment.
- Navajo Hogans: These are two of the only three Indian hogans that exist off the Northern Arizona Navajo Indian Reservation. The other hogan is located at the Heard Museum in Phoenix, Arizona.
- Xeriscape Arboretum: This desert arboretum has been growing since 1980 and has different species of plants from different regions.
- The Antique Railroad Bell: This bell was presented to Henry S. Sturgis in 1958. Mr. Sturgis was the vice president of the First National Bank who played an active part in railroad finances. He served as chairman of the executive committee of the Erie Railroad.

== Railroad clubs ==
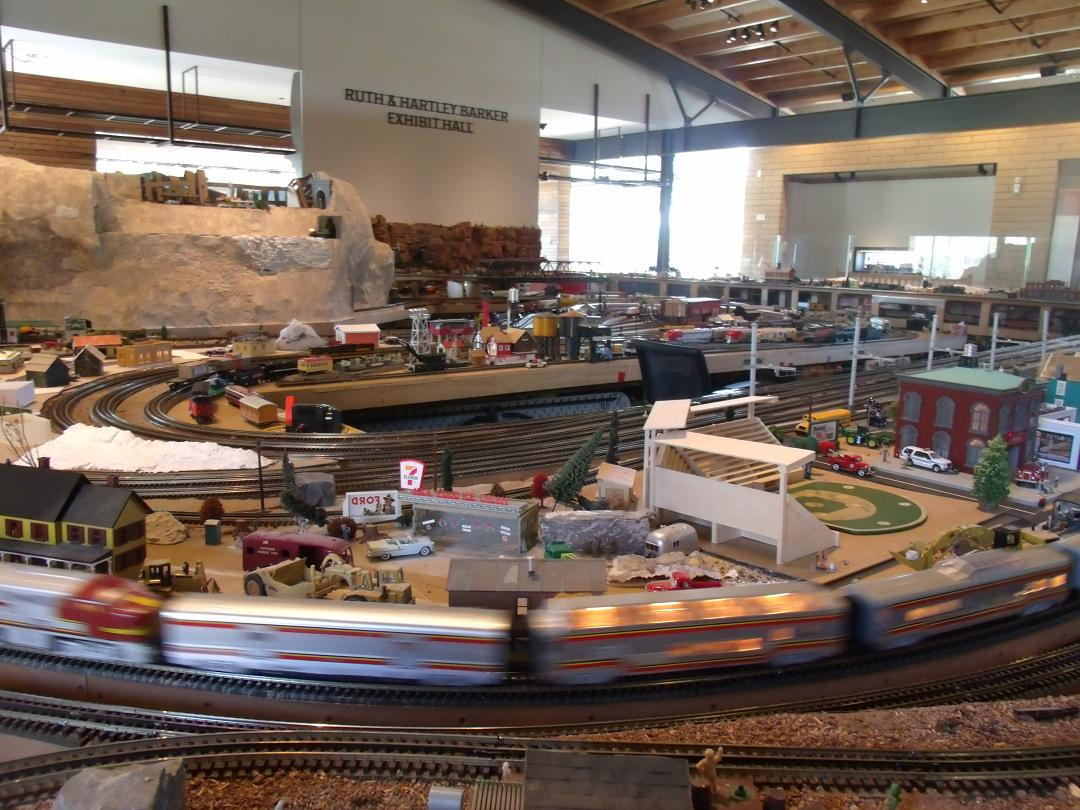
Scottsdale Model Railroad Club O scale model train layout housed in the McCormick Ranch Bunkhouse

Scottsdale Live Steamers: The Scottsdale Live Steamers is a 7 1/2 in (190.5 mm) gauge miniature railroad which surrounds the Xeriscape Arboretum and was the former home of the Maricopa Live Steamers. The track is 3,000 feet (914 m) long and has a loading platform, a train shed, a transfer table, a tunnel and one trestle. The layout has two main loops: the outer loop passes over the tunnel and the inner through it.

The following three railroad clubs are housed in the McCormick Ranch Bunkhouse:

- Scottsdale Model Railroad Historical Society: This club features a HO scale model train layout.
- Paradise & Pacific Tinplate Club: This club features an O scale model train layout.
- Sun-N Sand Club: This club features an N scale model train layout.

== Gallery ==
Attractions in McCormick-Stillman Railroad Park

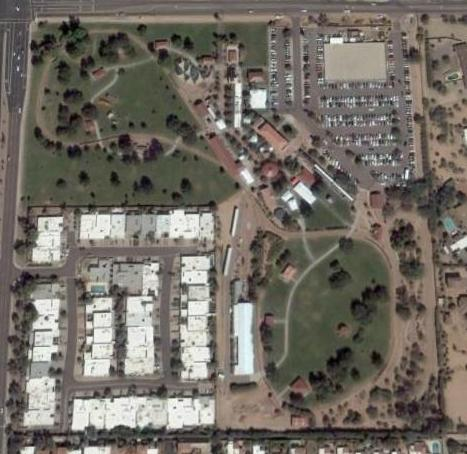
Aerial view of the McCormick-Stillman Railroad Park in 2006.

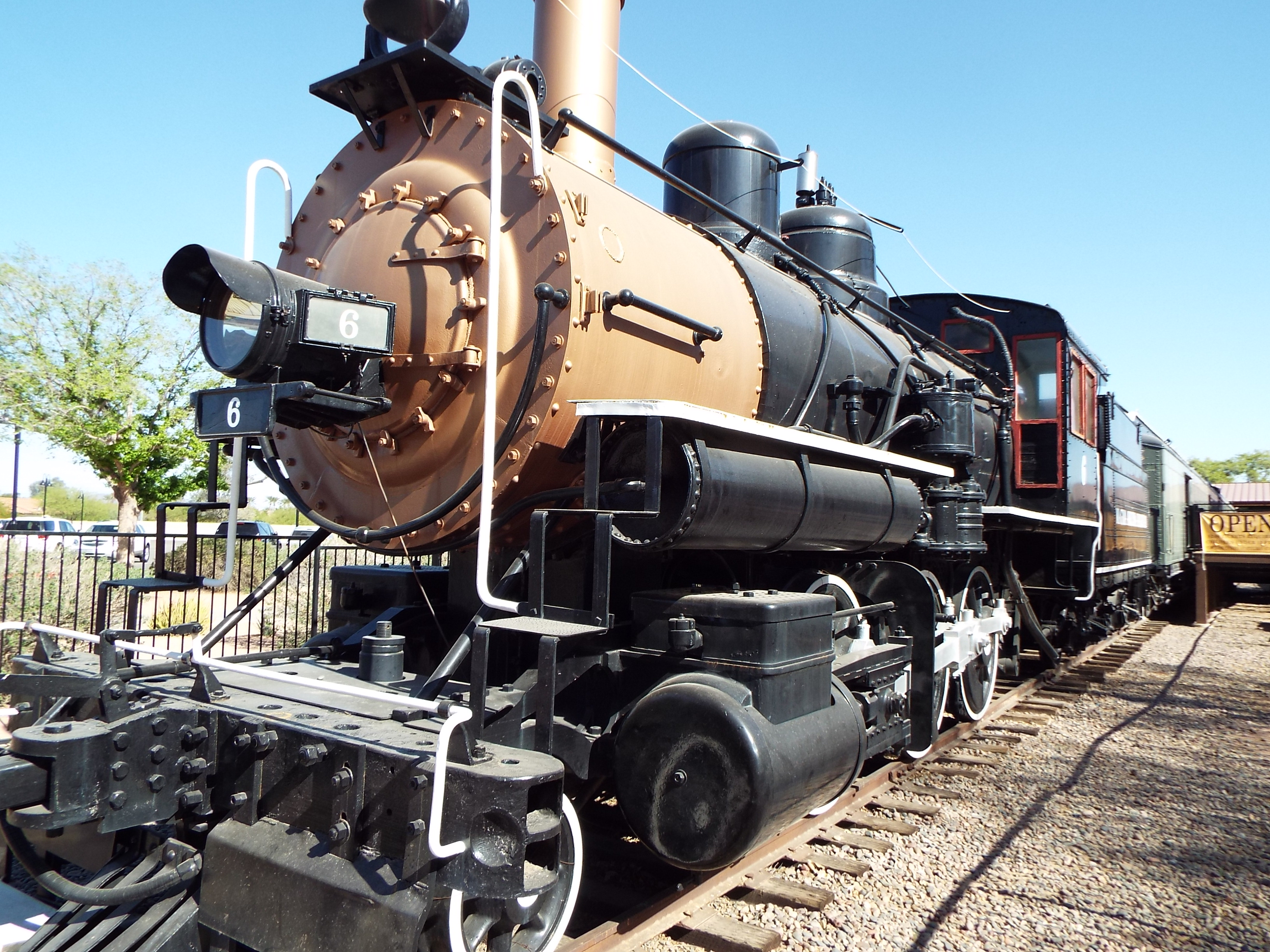
Historic Magma Arizona Railroad Engine No. 6, built in 1906

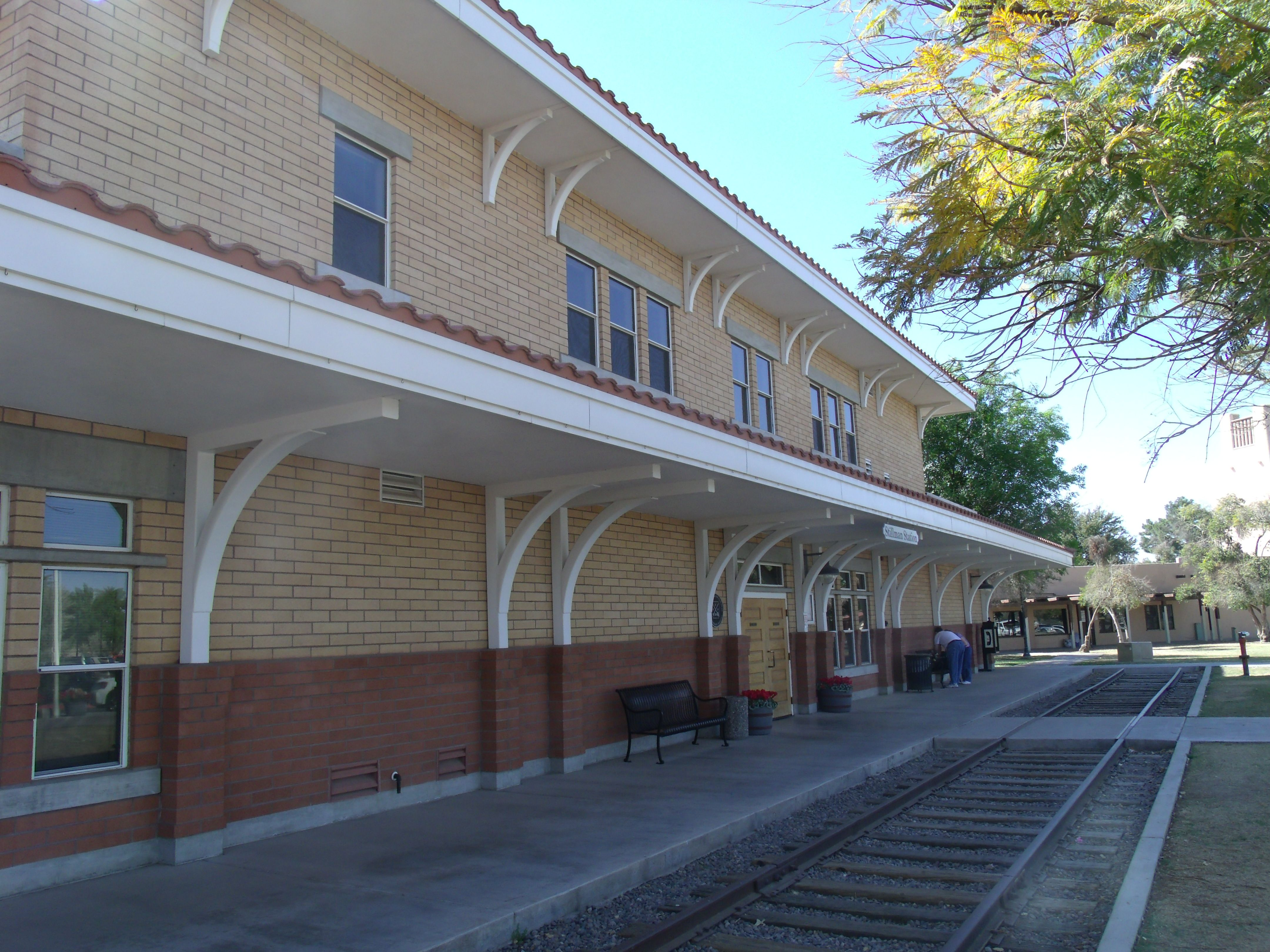
Front view of Stillman Station, a replica of the Clifton Station (Clifton Az.) built in 1901

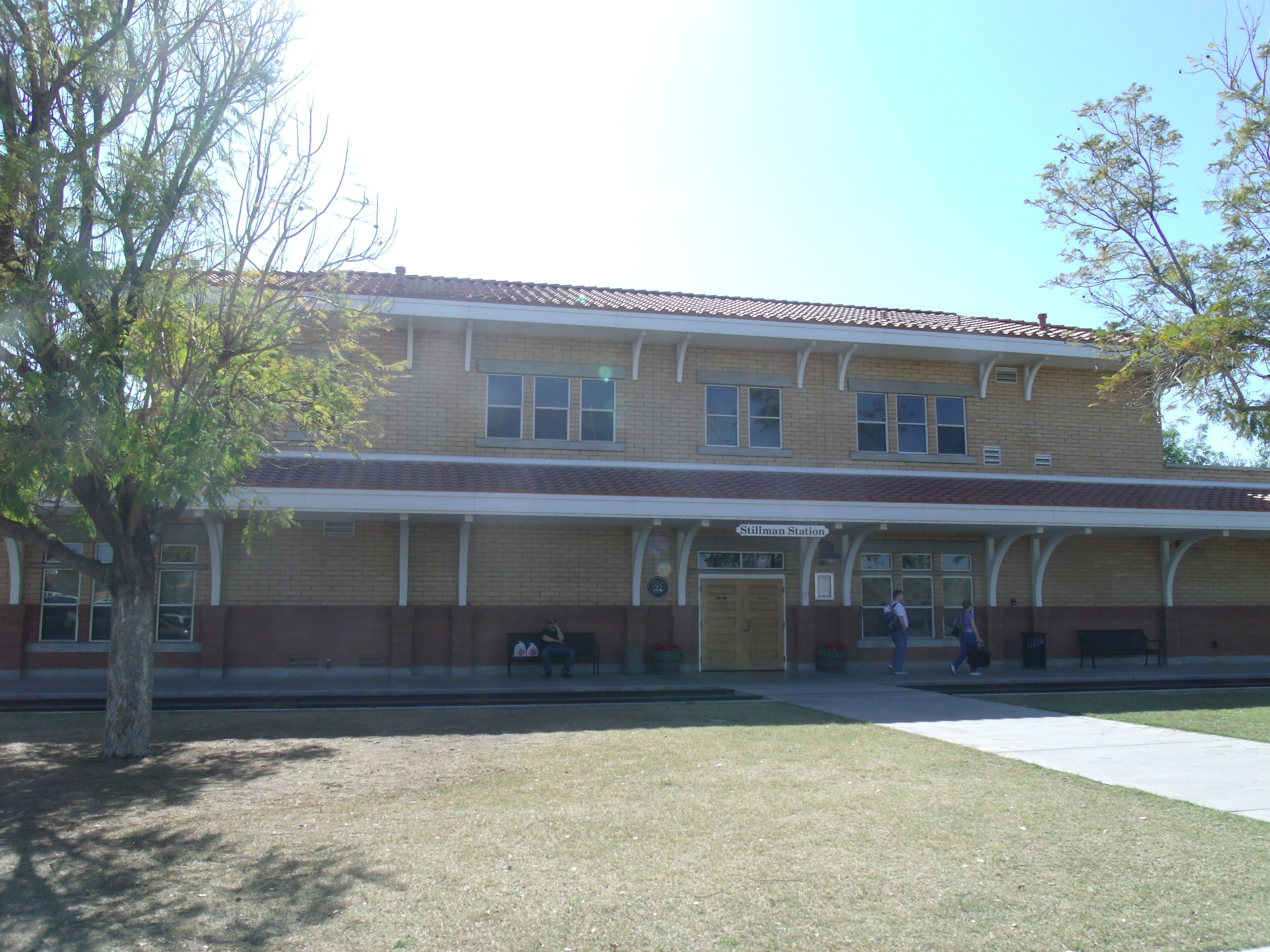
Rear view of the Stillman Station.

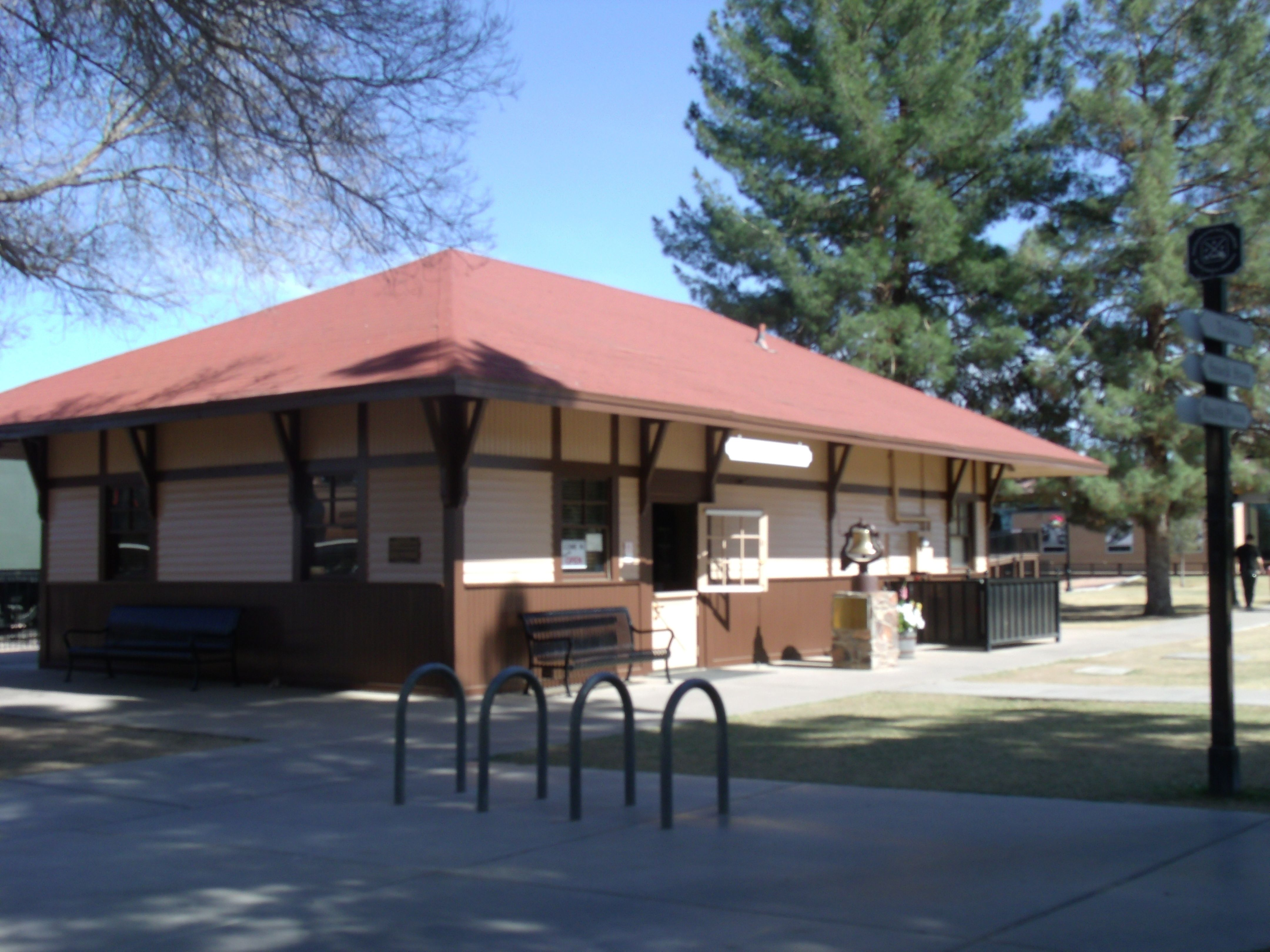
Peoria Railroad Depot – built in 1895 in Peoria, Az., was dismantled and rebuilt at the park

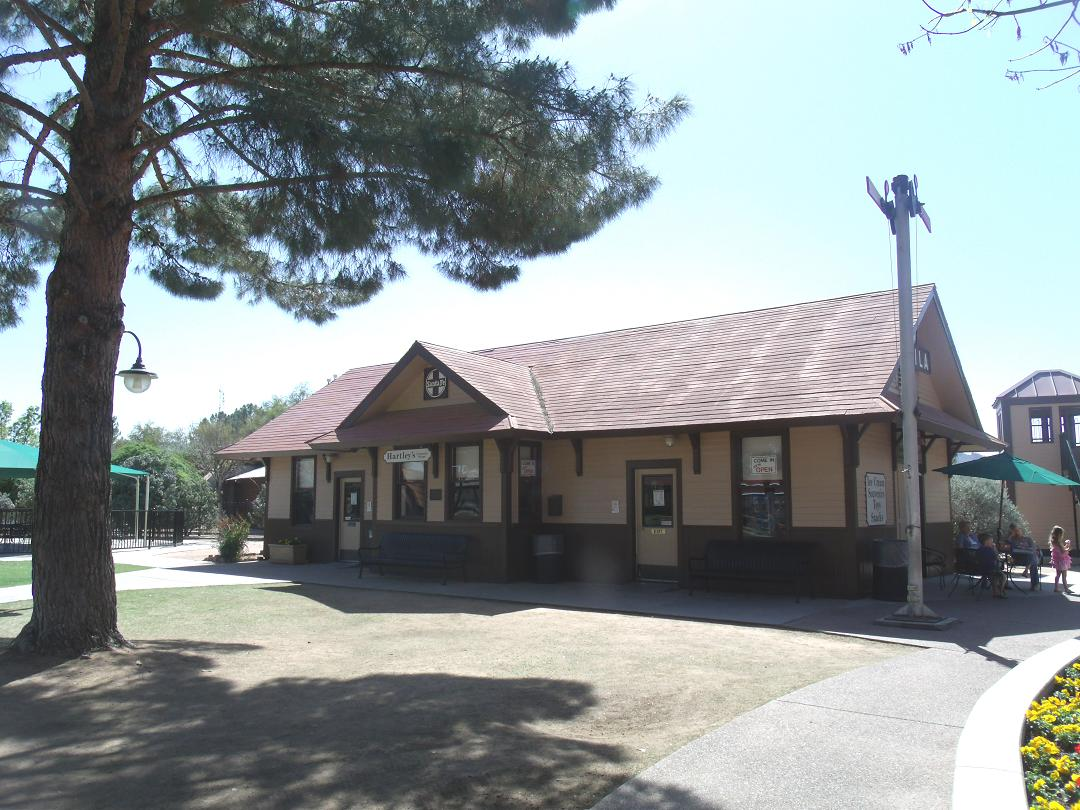
The Aguila Depot, built in 1907 by the Santa Fe, Prescott and Phoenix Railway and moved to the McCormick-Stillman Railroad Park in Scottsdale, Arizona.

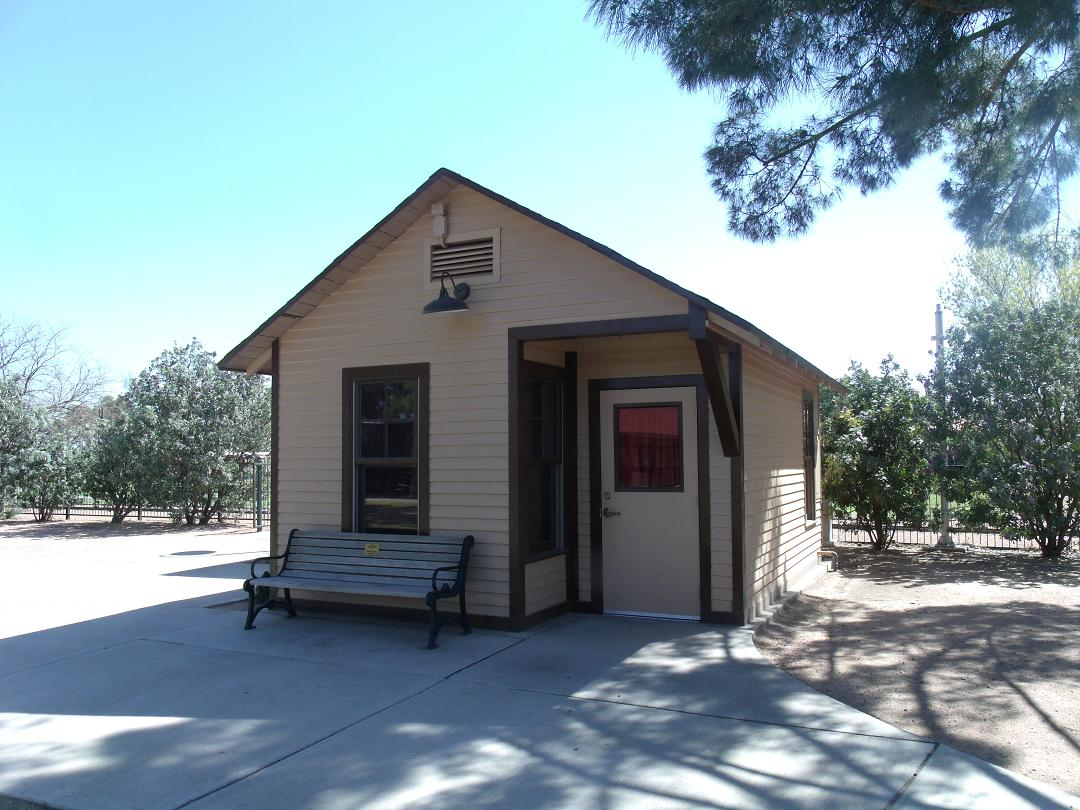
The Maricopa Depot, built in 1930s by the Southern Pacific Railroad and moved to the McCormick-Stillman Railroad Park in Scottsdale, Arizona.

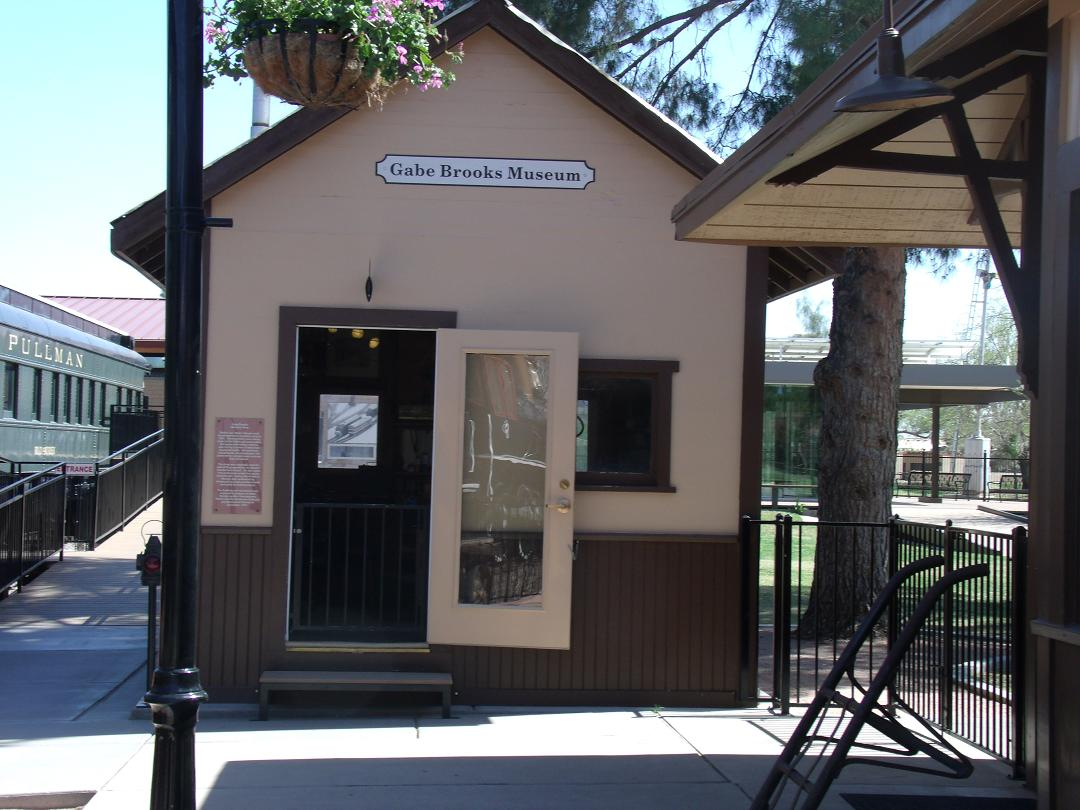
Walter "Gabe" Brooks Machine Shop built in 1930. The shop, which was Scottsdale first machine shop, was moved to the McCormick-Stillman Railroad Park in Scottsdale, Arizona and is now the "Gabe Brooks Museum".

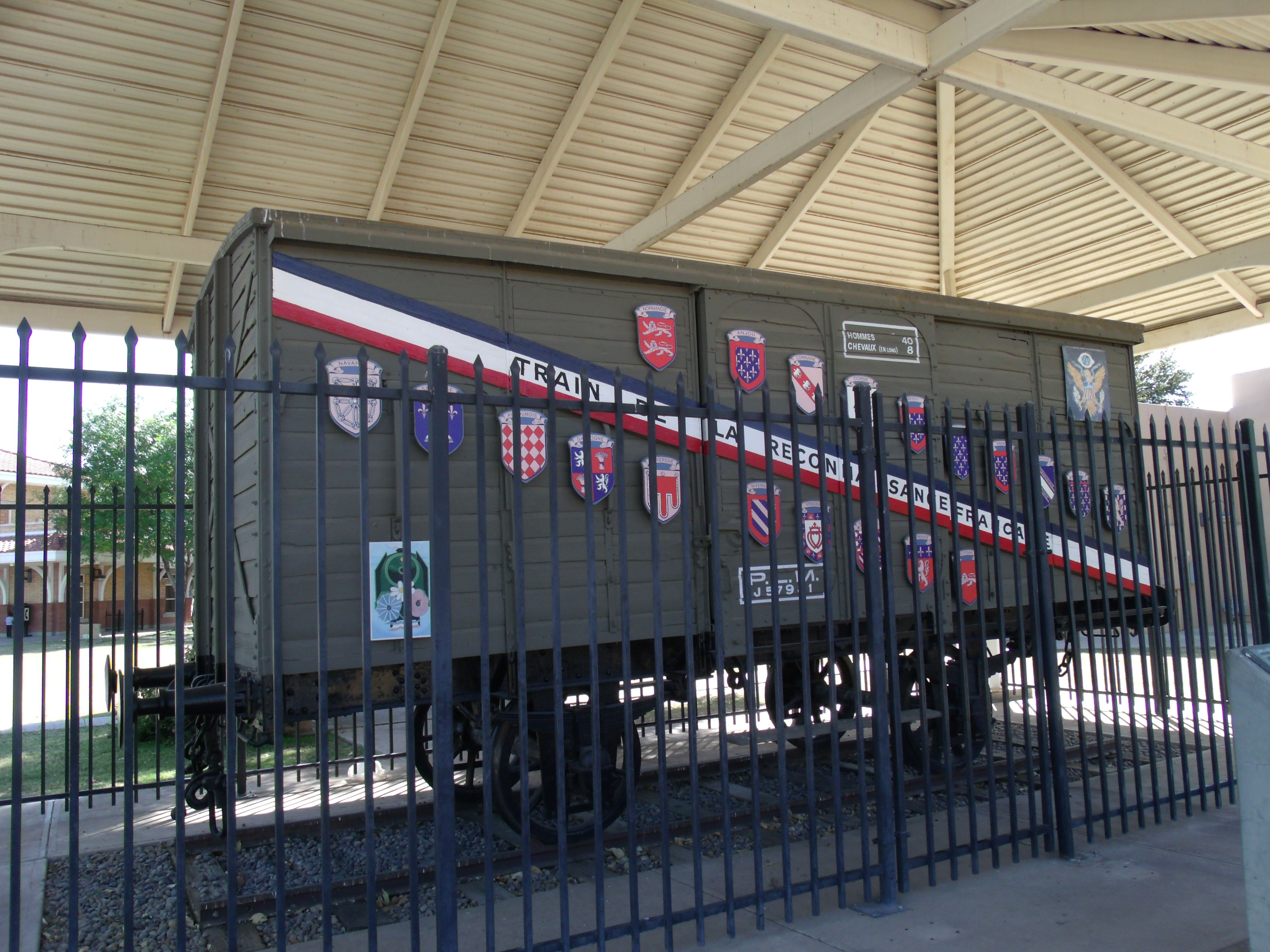
Boxcar of a "Merci Train" a.k.a. the "French Gratitude Train" (one of 49), built in 1949

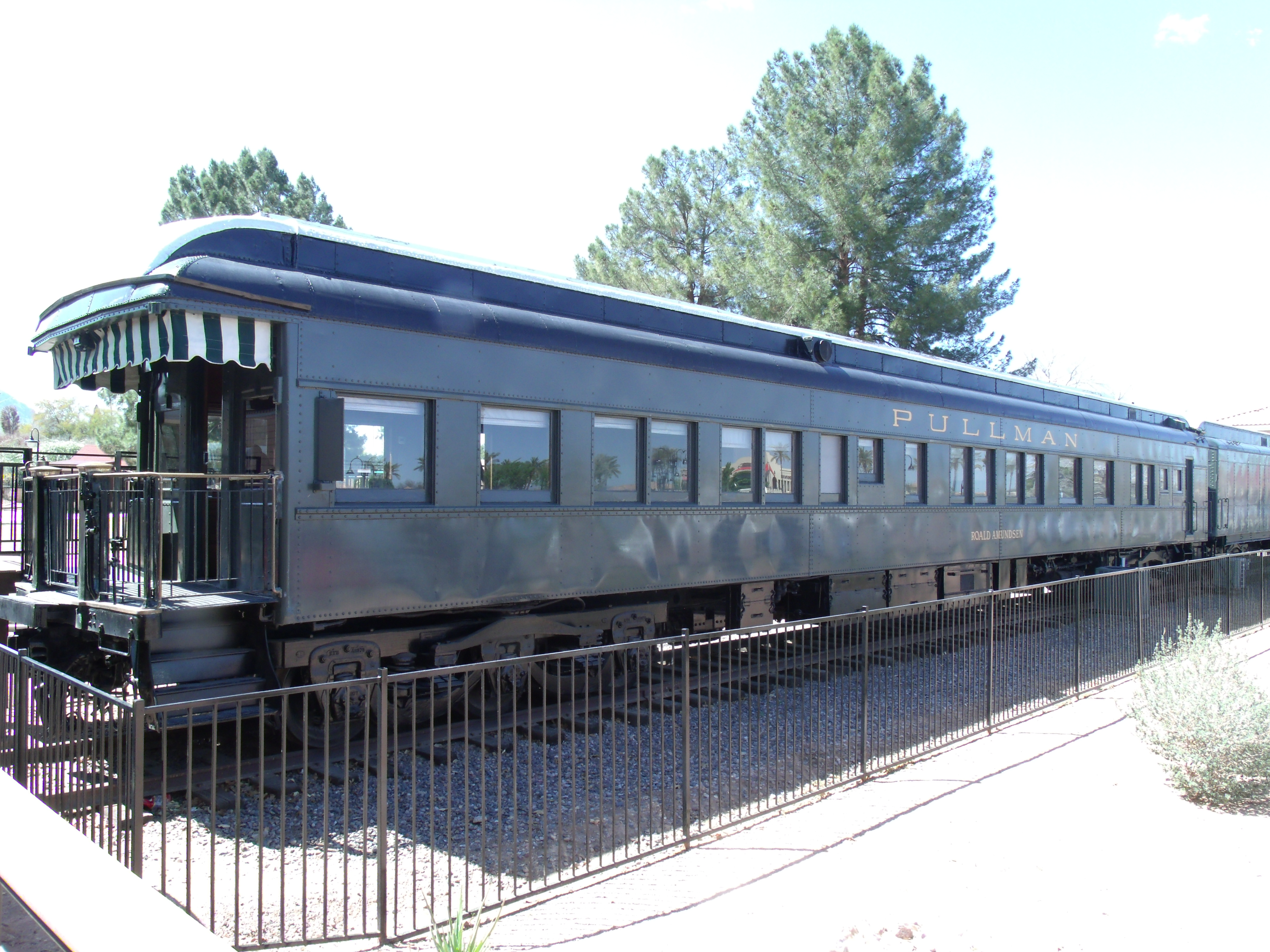
Historic (NRHP) Roald Amundsen Pullman Private Railroad Car built in 1928

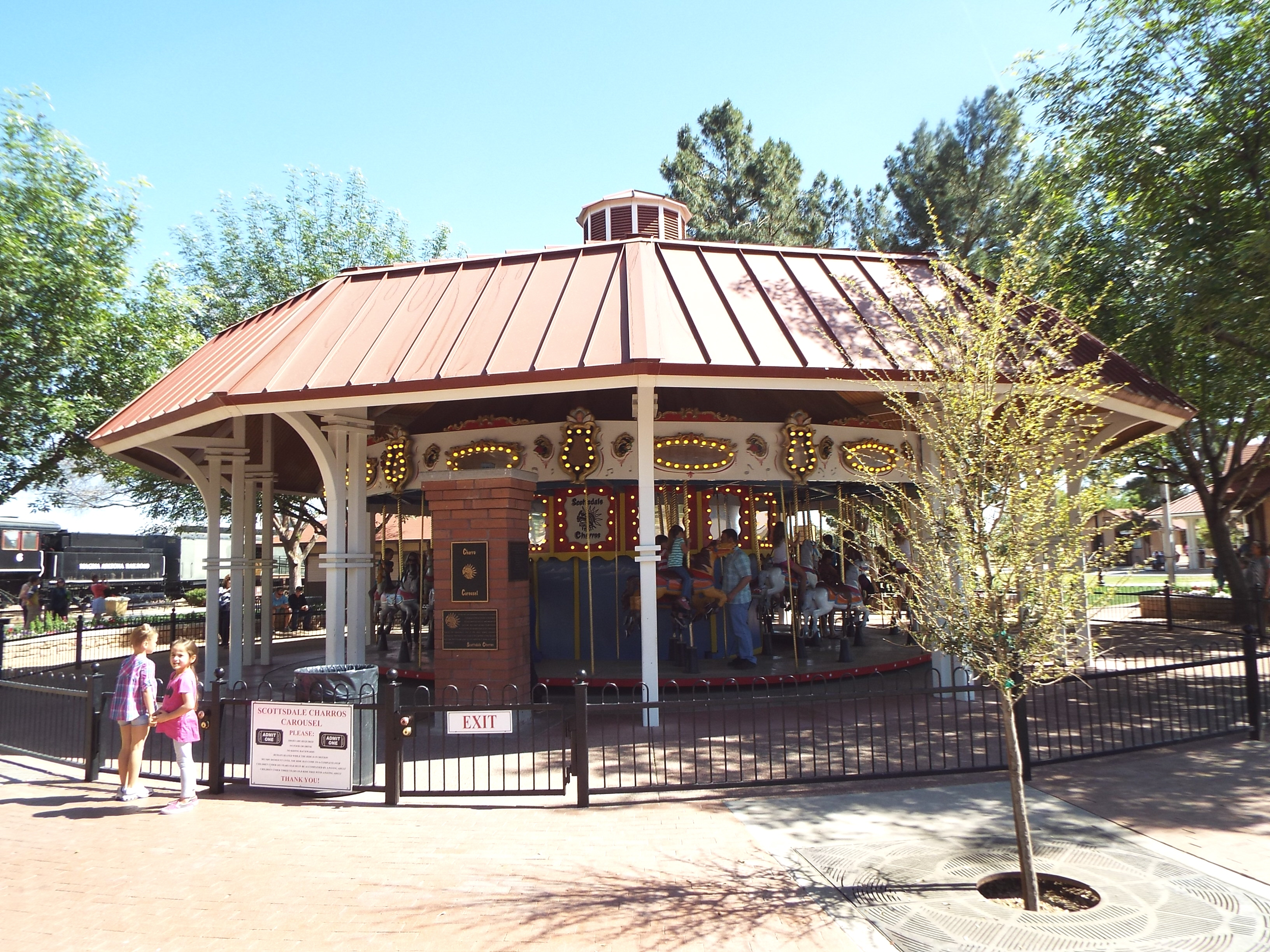
The Charro Carousal, built in 1950 and located in the McCormick-Stillman Railroad Park in Scottsdale, Arizona.

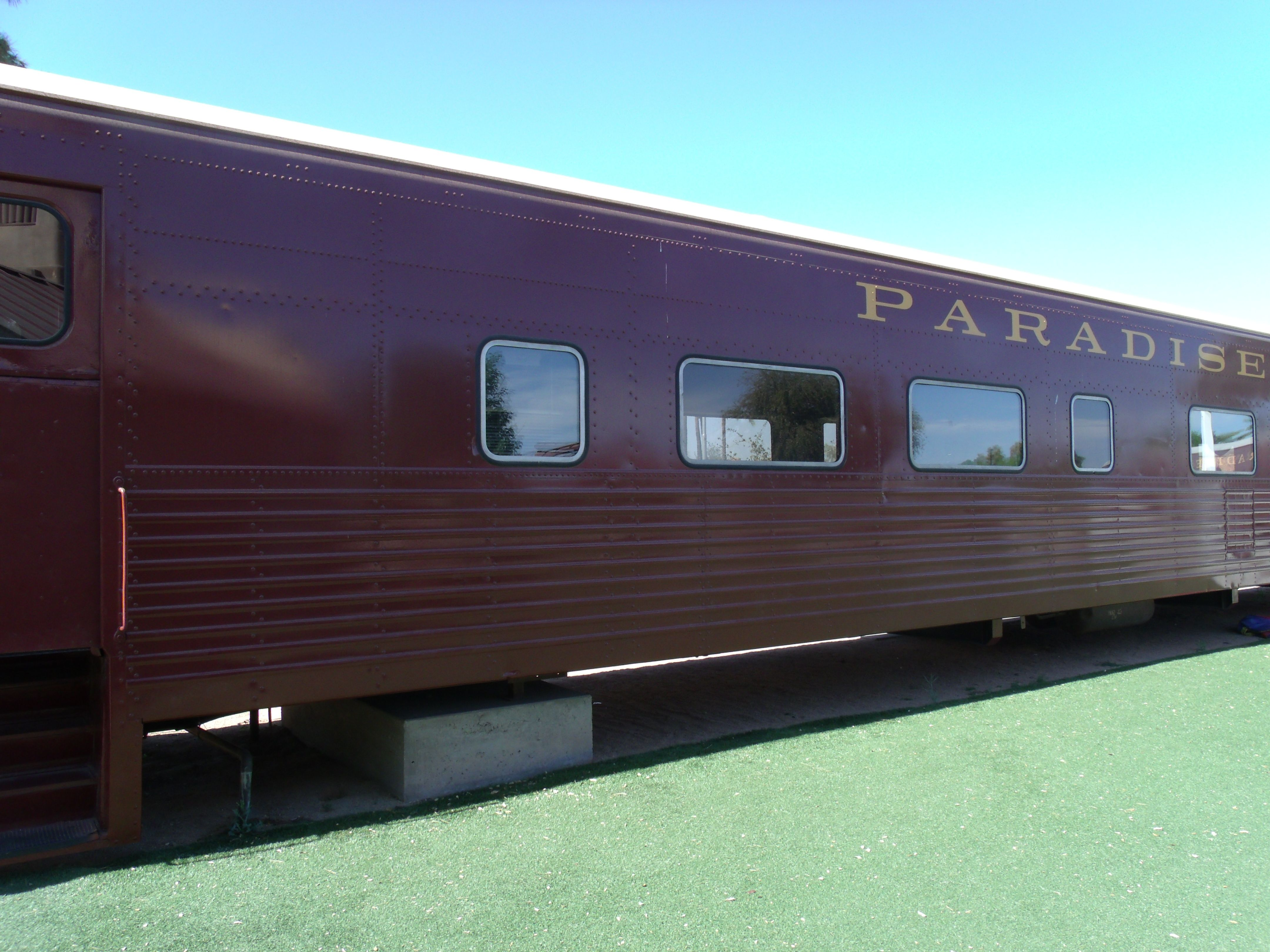
Paradise and Pacific Railroad Dining Car

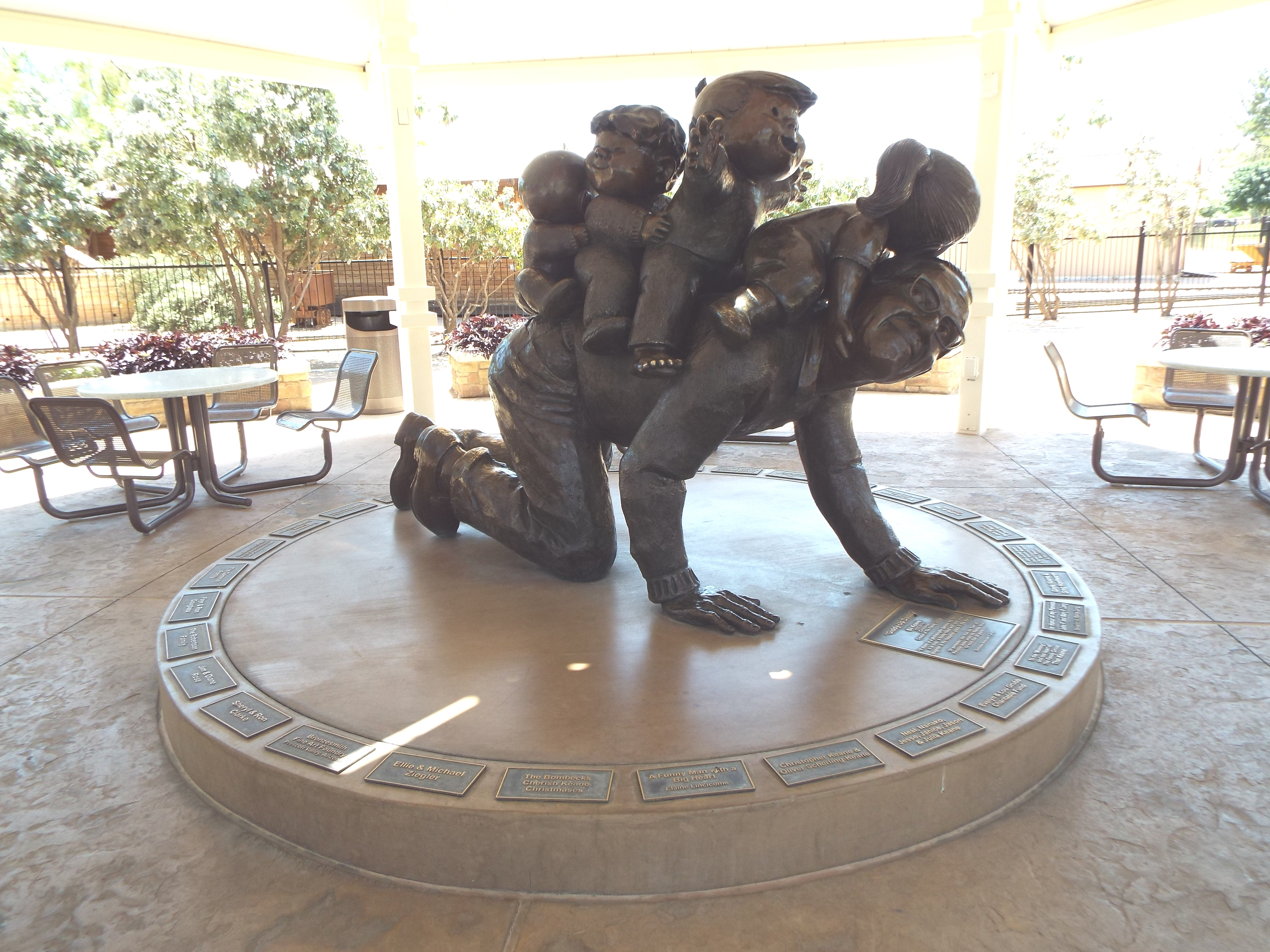
Bil Keane exhibit

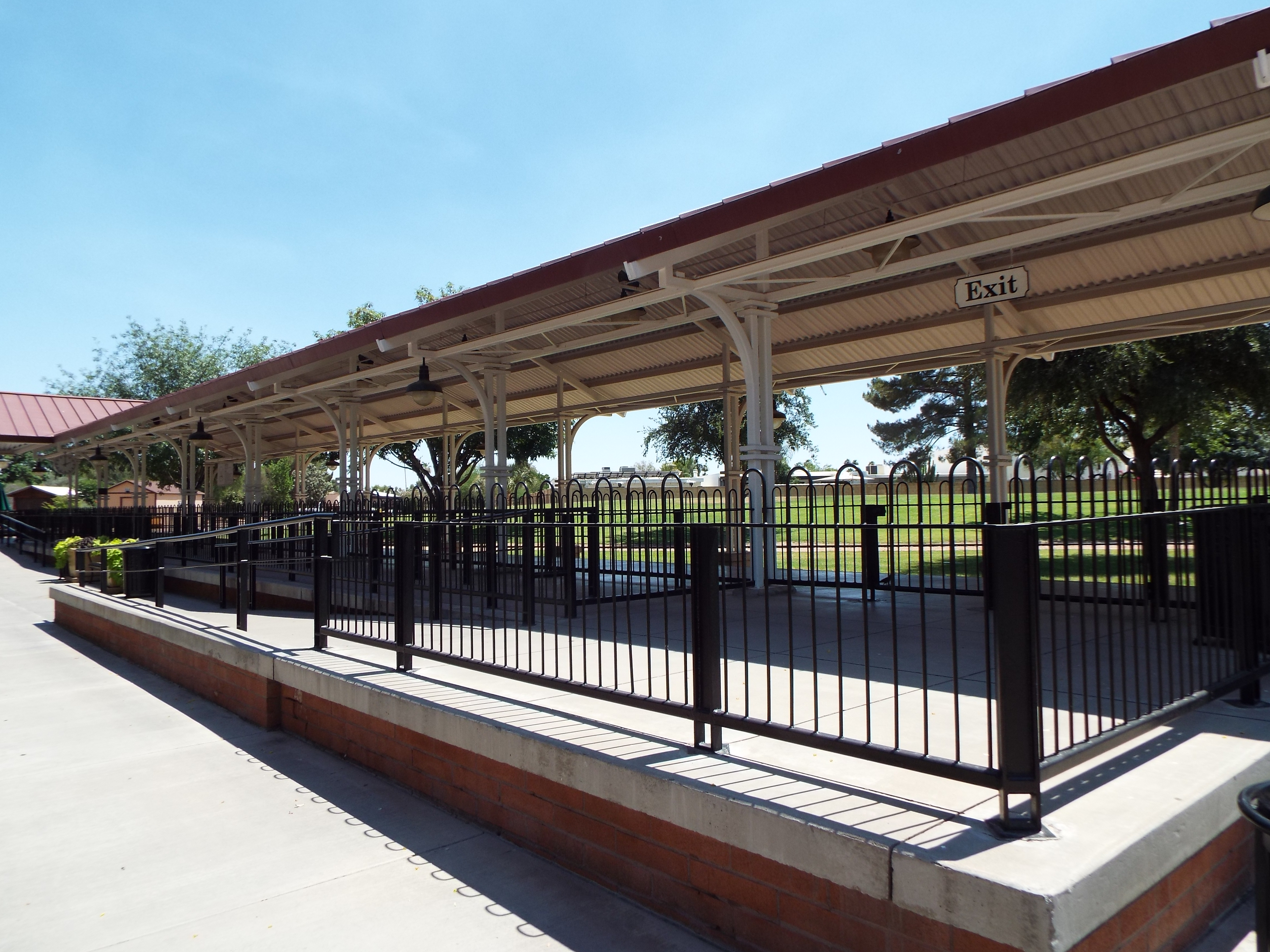
15 inch gauge Paradise and Pacific Railroad Depot

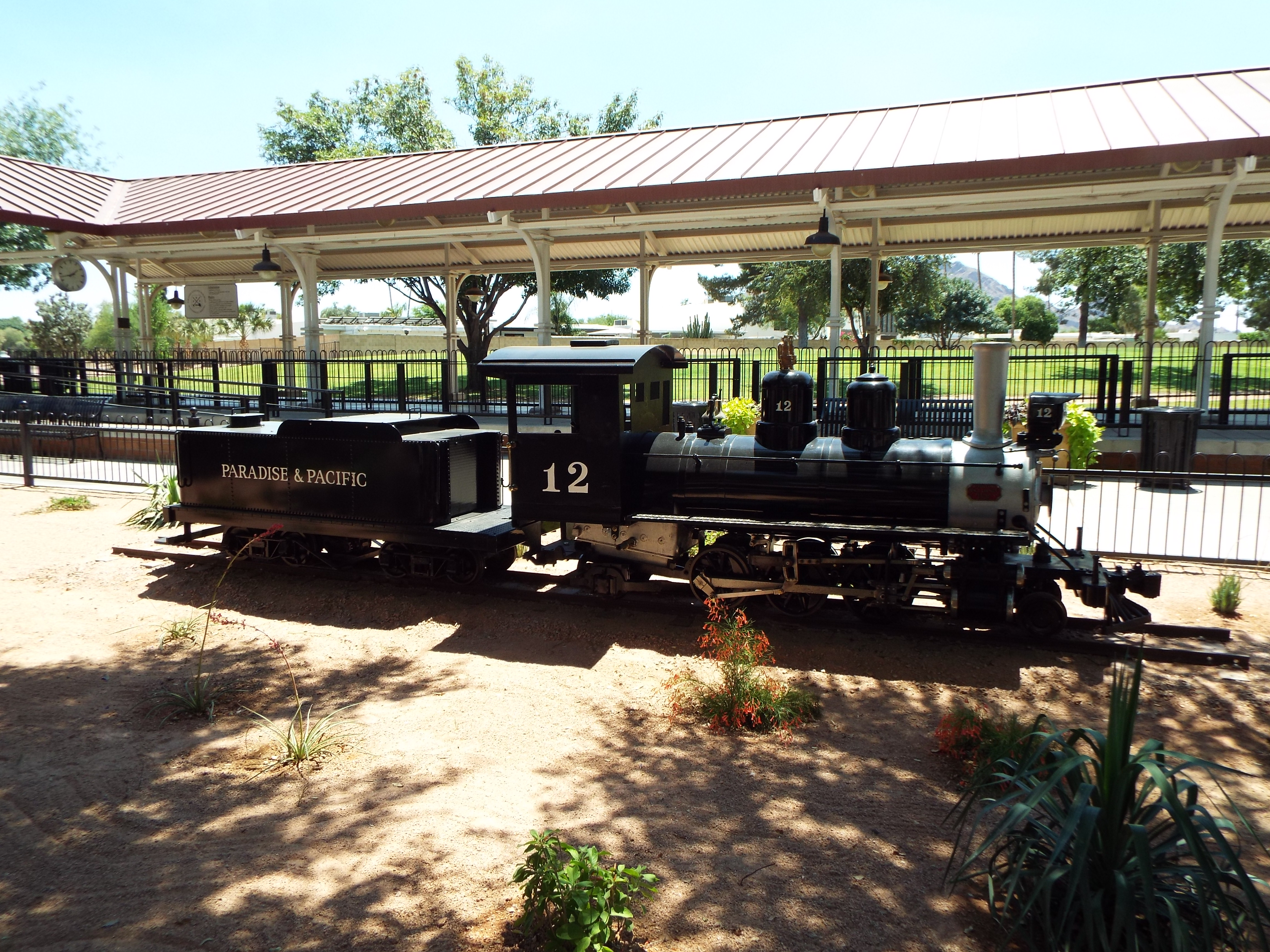
15 inch gauge Paradise and Pacific Railroad 2-6-2 Engine #12

== See also ==
- Adobe Mountain Desert Railroad Park
- List of heritage railroads in the United States
