= McCormick Ranch =

Planned community in Maricopa County, Arizona

Coordinates: 33.5525°N 111.90139°W

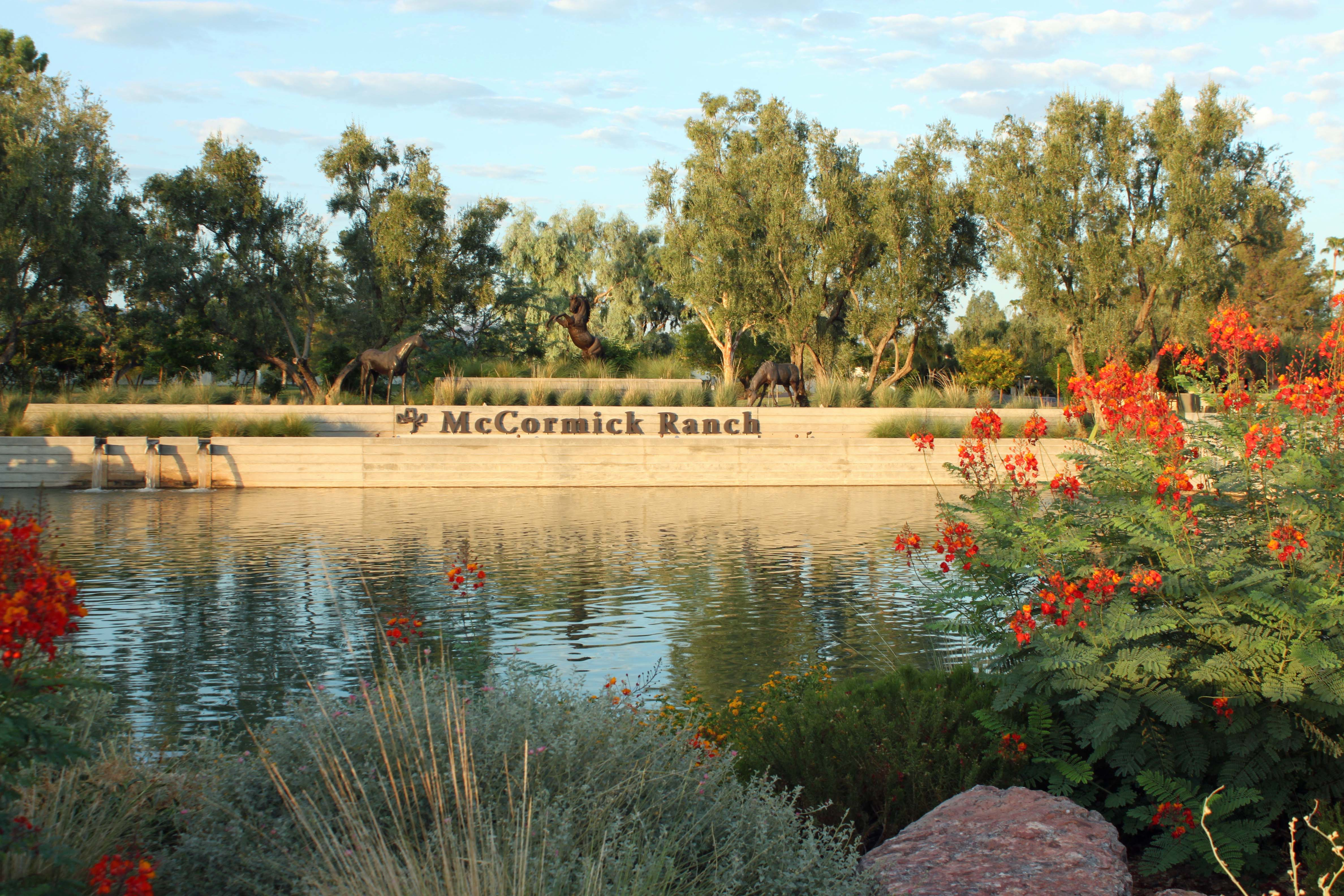
McCormick Ranch Entrance – Scottsdale Road

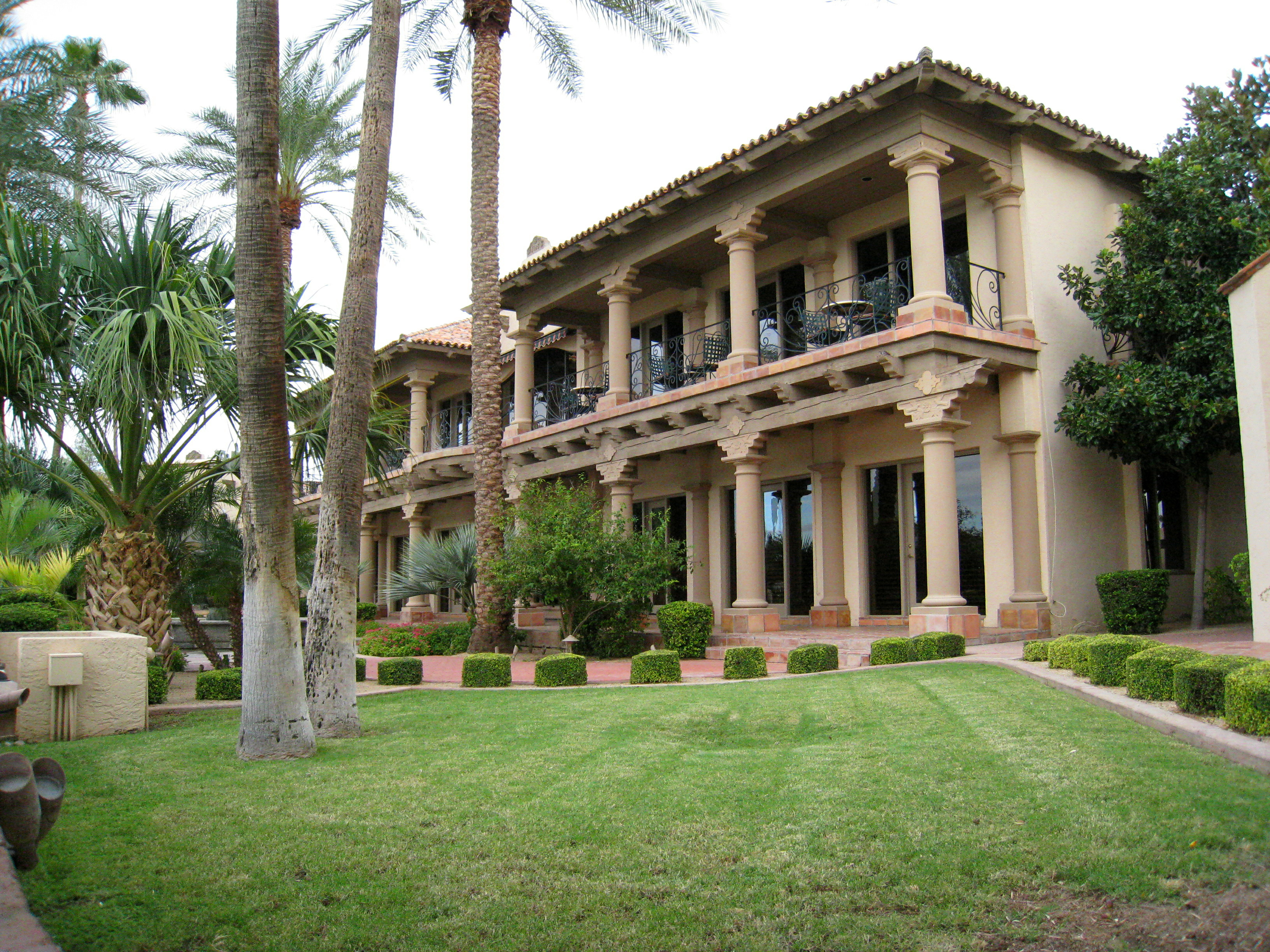
Office building, McCormick Ranch

McCormick Ranch refers to an area in Scottsdale, Arizona, which is one of the largest planned communities in Arizona.

== History ==
In 1921, the Jolly family built a ranch and home on 160 acres located at what is today the corner of Scottsdale and Indian Bend roads. This was purchased by Research Products Corporation, Cleveland, OH in 1941, who not long afterwards sold it to Fowler and Anne McCormick. Between 1942 and 1954, Anne and Fowler had begun to purchase parcels of land all around the Jolly/RP parcel. The ranch was primarily used as a winter home by the McCormicks, as they admired the warmer climate.

Fowler was not a stranger to money. His maternal grandfather was John D. Rockefeller Sr., while his paternal grandfather was Cyrus McCormick, the inventor of the mechanical reaper, which would form the foundation for the company later known as International Harvester. Fowler would later go on to be president and chairman of the board for International Harvester.

Anne McCormick was a lover of Arabian horses. In the mid-1950s, she devoted 150 acres of the northern part of her ranch near what is today the intersection of Shea Boulevard and Pima Road as an equestrian center devoted to Arabian horses, and called it Paradise Park. The Arabian Horse Association of Arizona held their annual show at Paradise Park from 1956 (its second year) through 1968, when it was moved to WestWorld. The Arizona Arabian Horse Show was the first of its kind dedicated to Arabian horses.

After Anne McCormick's death in 1969, a portion of the McCormick's land, about 4,236 acres, was sold to Kaiser-Aetna in the summer of 1970 for a purchase price of $12.1 million. Richard F Boultinghouse was the General Manager of McCormick Ranch and responsible for its real estate development. The development was incorporated in 1972, and according to real estate websites for the area, it has two championship 18-hole golf courses (McCormick Ranch Golf Club's Palm Course and Pine Course), more than 25 miles of bicycle paths, parks, public tennis courts, and 130 acres of man-made lakes (7 lakes total).

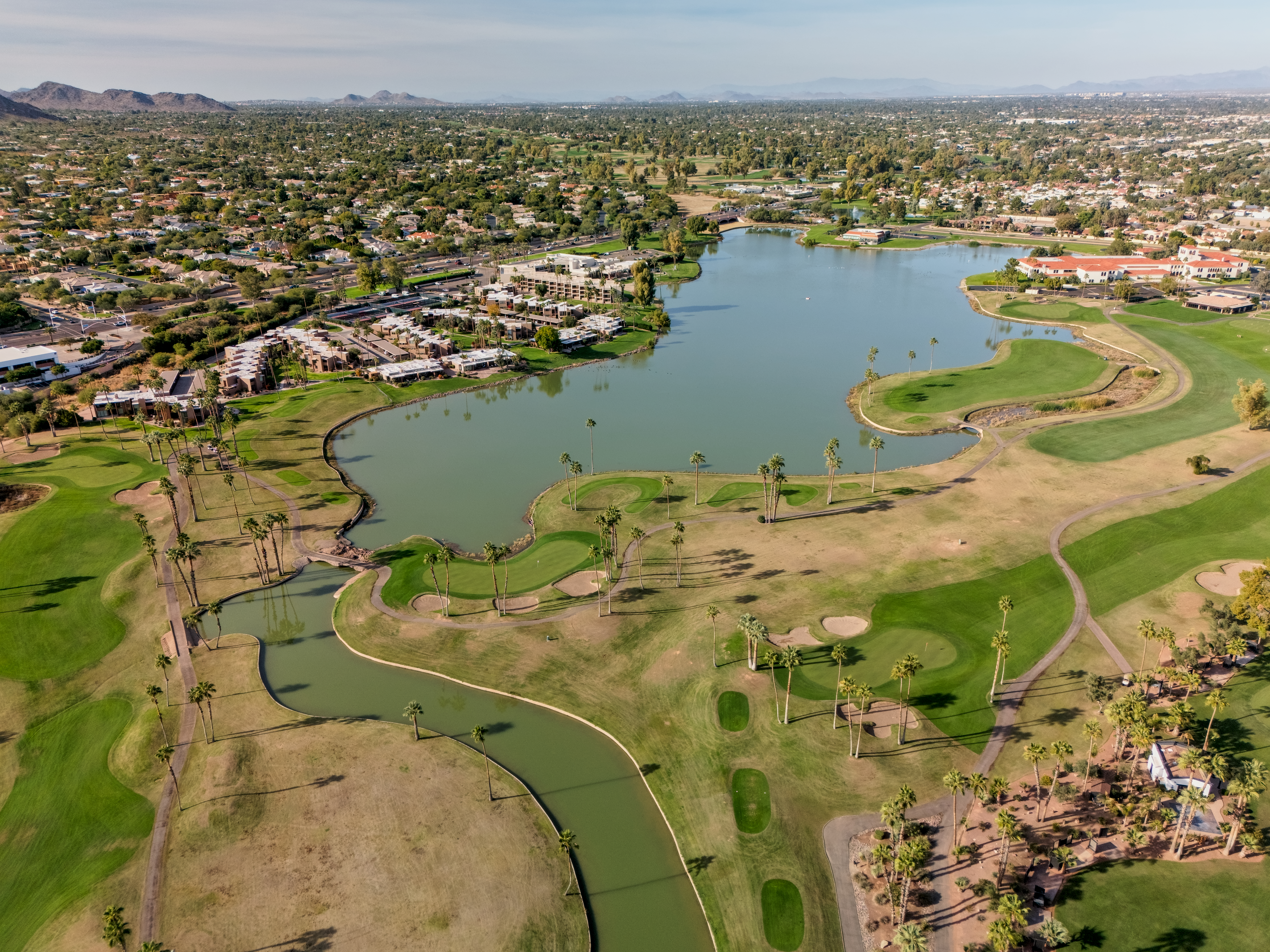
The largest of the man-made lakes

== Location ==
McCormick Ranch lies in what is considered "central Scottsdale," between Indian Bend Road to the south and the Shea Boulevard corridor to the north. The Town of Paradise Valley, Arizona is to the west, and the Salt River Pima–Maricopa Indian Community (SRPMIC) is to the east.

== Size ==
Covering an area of approximately 5 square miles, McCormick Ranch has almost 14,000 residents, for a population density of about 2700 people per square mile.

== Amenities ==
In addition to those listed above, McCormick Ranch has many high-end shops and offices located along the arterial streets that form its perimeter, and a few along interior streets. Commercial and recreational developments on the SRPMIC to the east include The Scottsdale Pavilions outdoor shopping center, Talking Stick Resort and golf course, Salt River Fields at Talking Stick (spring training home of the Arizona Diamondbacks and Colorado Rockies Major League Baseball franchises), Odysea Aquarium and the Butterfly Wonderland.

Scottsdale City parks interior to McCormick Ranch include Mountain View Park, Comanche Park, Shoshone Park, and Zuni Park.

Cochise Elementary School is adjacent to Mountain View Park.

Many green spaces within and adjacent to McCormick Ranch are connected to the City of Scottsdale's Indian Bend Wash Greenbelt.

The Mustang branch of the Scottsdale Public Library is just northeast of McCormick Ranch, as is the Shea Boulevard hospital campus of HonorHealth.

== See also ==
- McCormick-Stillman Railroad Park
