= Roald Amundsen (railcar) =

Roald Amundsen Pullman car
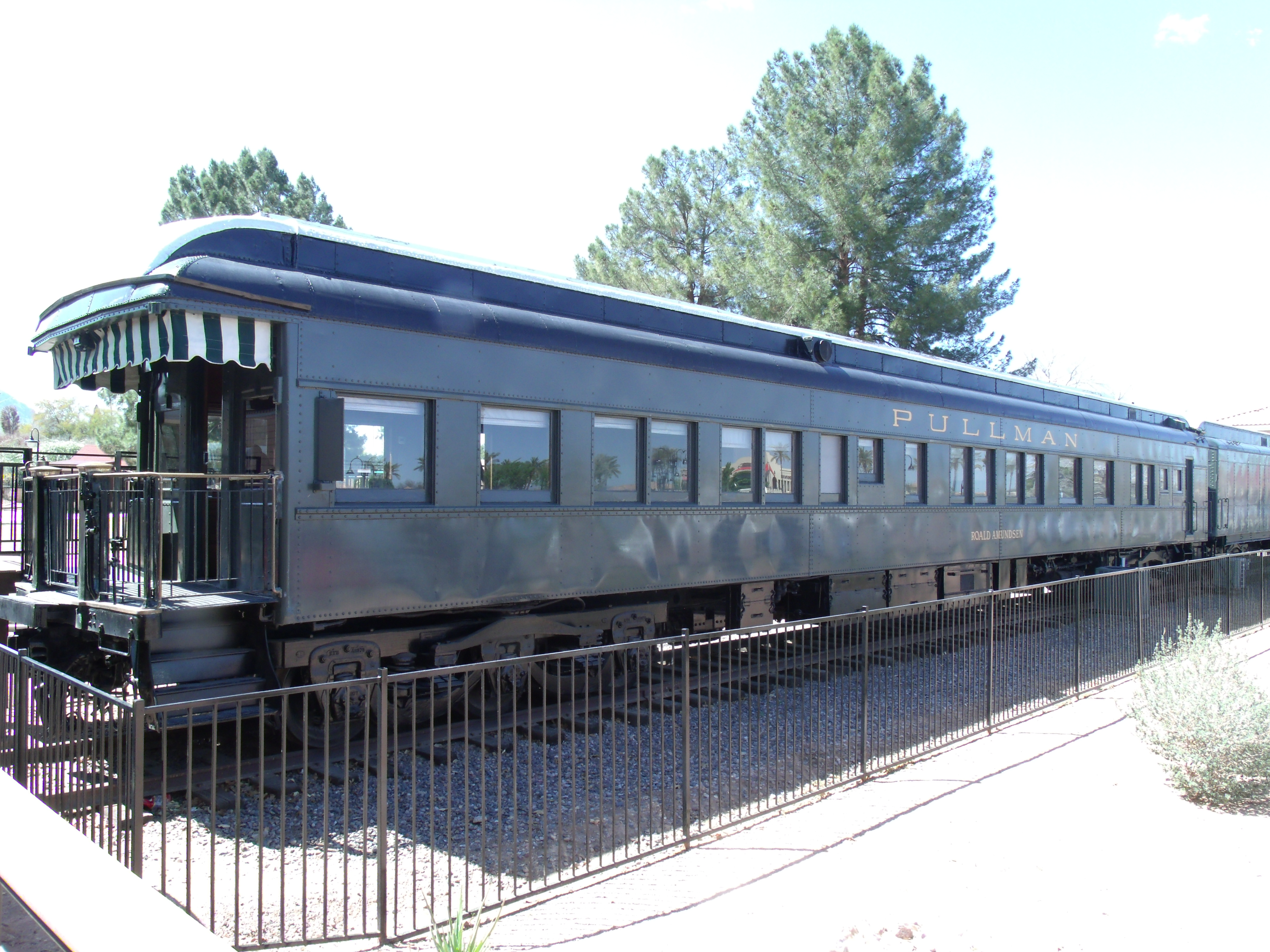
- The Roald Amundsen on display in Scottsdale, Arizona
- Manufacturer: Pullman Company
- Order no.: Lot 6246
- Constructed: 1929
- Diagram: Pullman Plan 3972C

Specifications
- Track gauge: 4 ft 8 1/2 in (1,435 mm)
- Roald Amundsen Pullman Private Railroad Car
- U.S. National Register of Historic Places
- Location: Maricopa County, Arizona, USA
- Nearest city: Scottsdale, Arizona
- Coordinates: 33°32′15″N 111°55′22″W
- NRHP reference No.: 09000582
- Designated: August 6, 2009

Named after the Norwegian explorer, the Roald Amundsen is a former Pullman Company private car; the last of six Explorer-series cars built between 1927 and 1929 for the Pullman Company's pool of passenger cars. It was frequently used as the United States Presidential Rail Car, and was used for every president from Herbert Hoover through Dwight Eisenhower.

During World War II, sister car Ferdinand Magellan was rebuilt as the official presidential private car; after the war, the Roald Amundsen was surplus to the Pullman Company's requirements and was sold, and became a business car for the New York Central Railroad. In 1971 it was donated to the McCormick-Stillman Railroad Park in Scottsdale, Arizona.

In 2009 the Roald Amundsen was placed on the National Register of Historic Places.

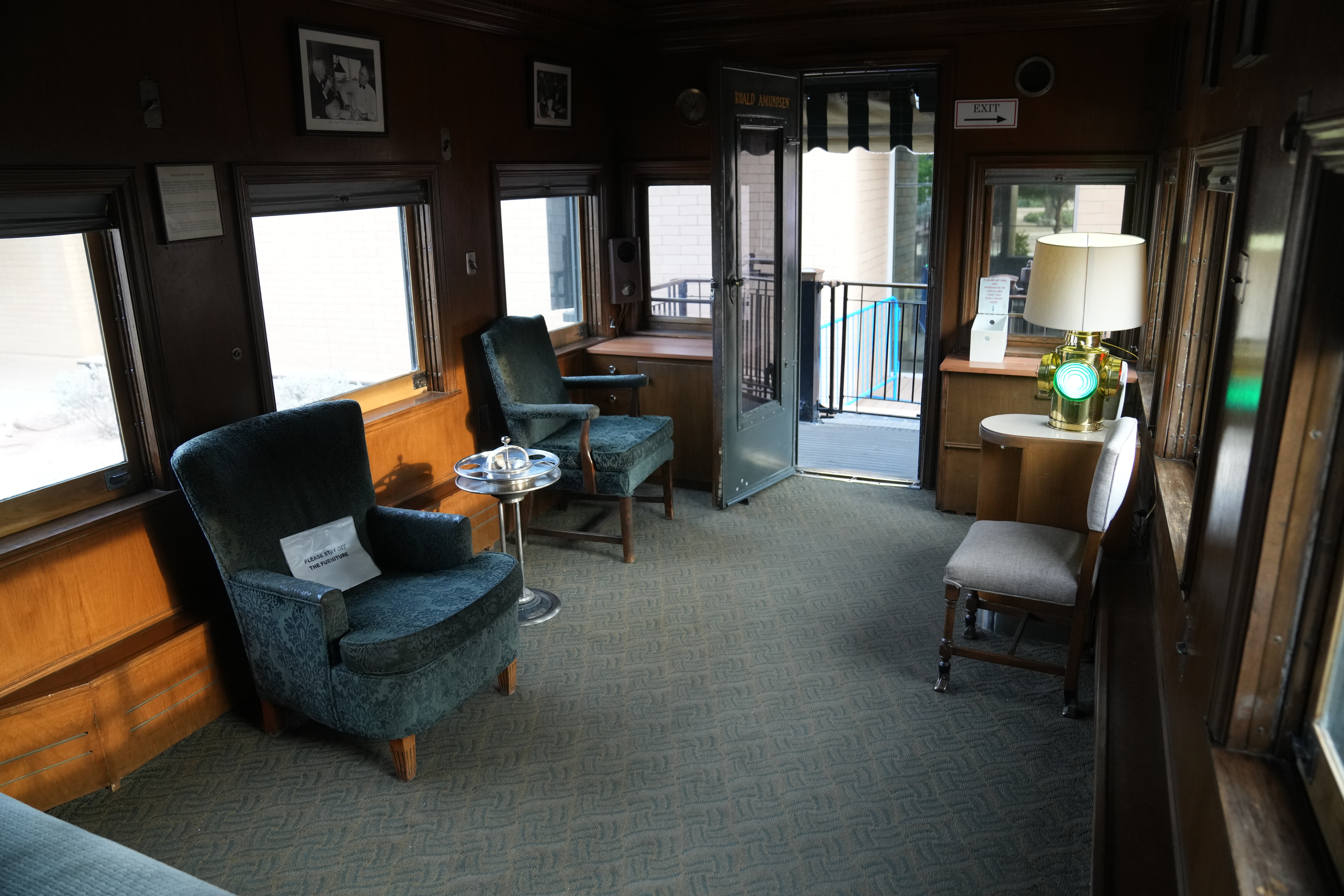
Roald Amundsen Pullman Private Railroad Car Salon

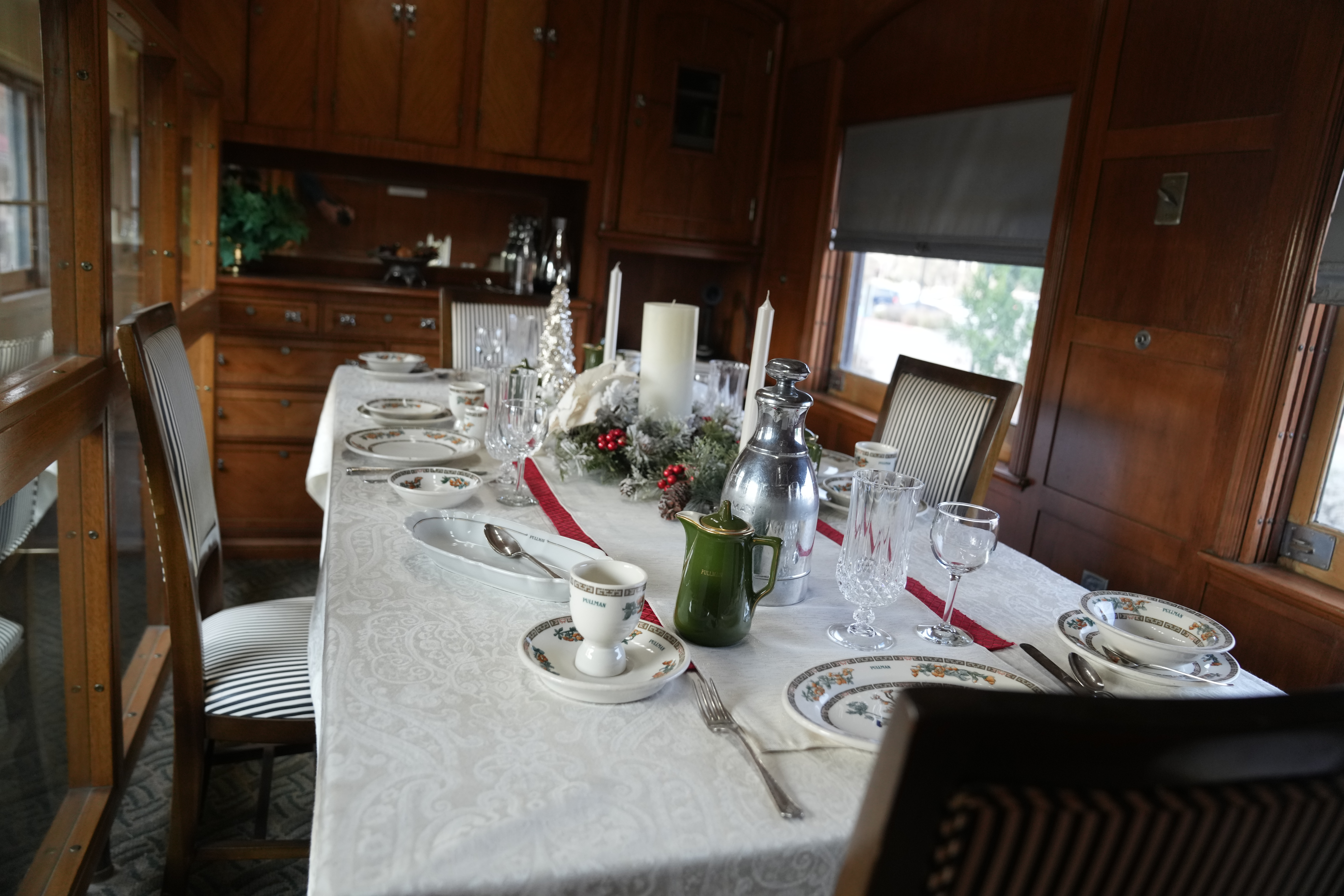
Roald Amundsen Pullman Private Railroad Car set for Christmas Dinner

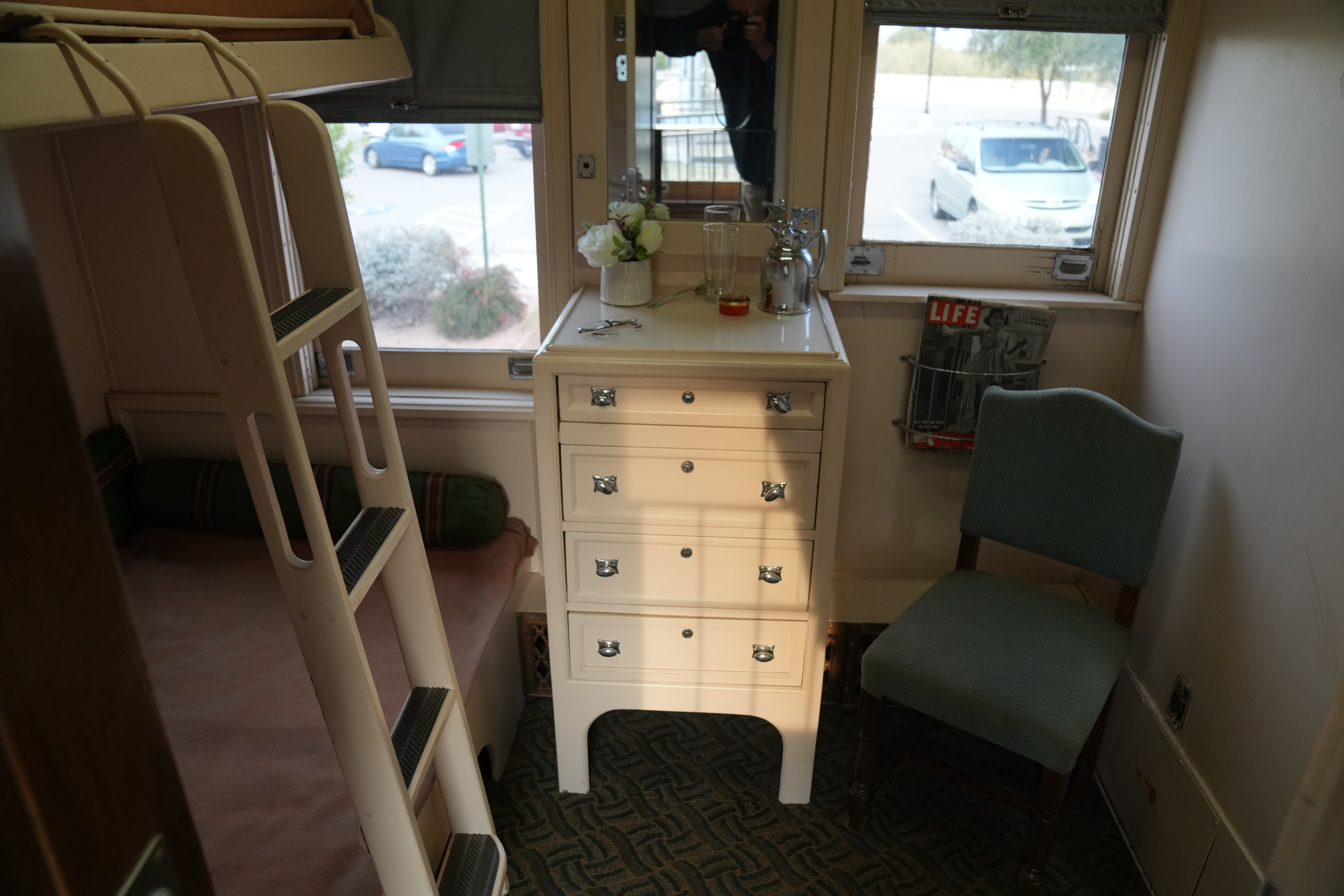
Roald Amundsen Pullman Private Railroad Car Bedroom
