= Abraham Lincoln (Pullman car) =

- Denver and Rio Grande Western Railroad Business Car No. 101
- U.S. National Register of Historic Places
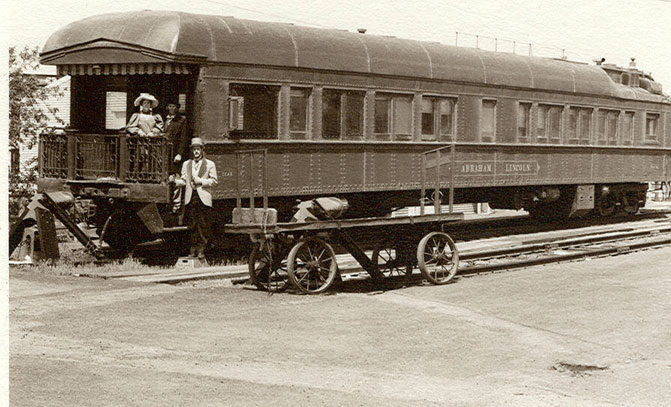
- Sepia tone image of the Abraham Lincoln passenger car after restoration.

- Location within Washington (state) Location within the United States
- Location: Temporarily in Othello, Washington, about 2 miles (3.2 km) north of the town of Othello, Washington
- Coordinates: 46°50′09″N 119°10′29″W
- Built: 1910
- Architect: Pullman Co.; Denver & Rio Grande Western Railroad
- NRHP reference No.: 88000740
- Added to NRHP: June 16, 1988

The Abraham Lincoln, also known as Denver and Rio Grande Western Railroad Business Car No. 101, is the oldest operable passenger car in the United States allowed to run on tracks operated by Amtrak. It is listed on the National Register of Historic Places.

== Construction and revenue use ==
In 1910, with Robert Todd Lincoln as the company president, the Pullman Car Company suddenly changed from the 60-foot (18 m) varnished wood railroad cars to the 80-foot (24 m), riveted-steel design. The new technology of the time was electric lighting, so the new cars required the addition of electrical wiring, switches, switchboards, generators, and batteries. Wood and steel trucks were replaced with massive structural steel castings.

It was September of this year that coach 895 was manufactured for the Western Pacific Railroad (WP) at an original cost of $13,624.50 (equivalent to $330,677 in 2024). The car was configured as an 84-seat coach and was the culmination of the most modern design and construction of heavyweight steel cars from the Pullman Company. Pullman passenger cars such as the WP 895 were the ultimate in travel prior to World War I.

On January 11, 1924, coach 895 became Denver and Rio Grande Railroad (D&RG) number 926. At that time, its book value was given at $8,783.90 (equivalent to $127,128 in 2024). In 1929, the railroad car was rebuilt by the D&RG in their Burnham shops, Denver, Colorado, to a self-contained private railroad car for the president of the Denver and Rio Grande Western Railroad (D&RGW). Numbered D&RG 101, it was complete with staterooms, office, bathrooms, observation room, kitchen, dining room, and porter's compartment. At this time, the 101 was refitted with six-wheel trucks (estimated book value of $580.65). The (used) 1910 trucks were from one of the three buffet-library cars originally built for the Western Pacific, which were renumbered 981, 982, and 984 in 1915–16. These buffet-library cars were moved to a lower service as D&RGW baggage cars 741, 742, and 744, and their six-wheel trucks replaced with two-axle trucks in 1929. Four of these trucks are the ones that found their way to the D&RG Car 101 and its sister car, the 102. The rebuild cost $33,294.22 (equivalent to $477,458 in 2024) in December 1929 is when it received its present design and floor plan. At 190,000 pounds (86,000 kg), the D&RG Business Car 101 was the pride and status symbol of the powerful and elite in the business world, but within two weeks of its unveiling, the stock market crash of 1929 brought reality back into perspective.

The 101 was built and initially assigned to the president of the D&RGW and is a unique example of rail cars at the turn of the century. It has survived almost a hundred years as a rare example of "state of the art" 1910 railroad technology. The interior was distinguished by its hand crafted satin walnut lightly accented with bronze hardware and richly tailored fabrics.

== Retirement and restoration ==
In September 1964, the car was retired and sold to Golden West Rail Tours. At this time, it had a book value of $47,659.60 (equivalent to $367,342 in 2024), and accrued depreciation of $44,409.60 (equivalent to $342,292 in 2024), for a net value of $3,250 (equivalent to $25,050 in 2024). The car was later sold for scrap value.

The car had been in a scrapyard near Los Angeles until it was purchased in October 1983 by Curtis Andrews, an industrial design engineer from Othello, Washington, for $50,000 (equivalent to $131,945 in 2024). Andrews moved the car to Tucson, Arizona, for an eight-month refurbishment to allow it to be leased on Amtrak excursions at speeds of up to 110 miles per hour (180 km/h). The project included the installation of newer trucks from a U.S. Army hospital car, replacement of its brake systems, and a 45-page engineering analysis. The car was renamed the Abraham Lincoln in honor of Abraham Lincoln and his son, Pullman executive Robert Todd Lincoln. It was then transported behind an Amtrak train to Spokane, Washington, and onward to Bruce, Washington, a railroad siding and industrial site just east of Othello. Further restoration work led to the replacement of the interior.

In July 1988, the Abraham Lincoln was listed on the National Register of Historic Places. It is the oldest operational car in America allowed on tracks run by Amtrak and one of few remaining heavyweight steel Pullman Cars. Andrews had made the car available for public viewing in Bruce on limited occasions and has not leased it out for rail excursions.

== See also ==
- Messenger of Peace Chapel Car, Snoqualmie, Washington
- National Register of Historic Places listings in Adams County, Washington
