= Private railroad car =

Railcar that is used for private individuals

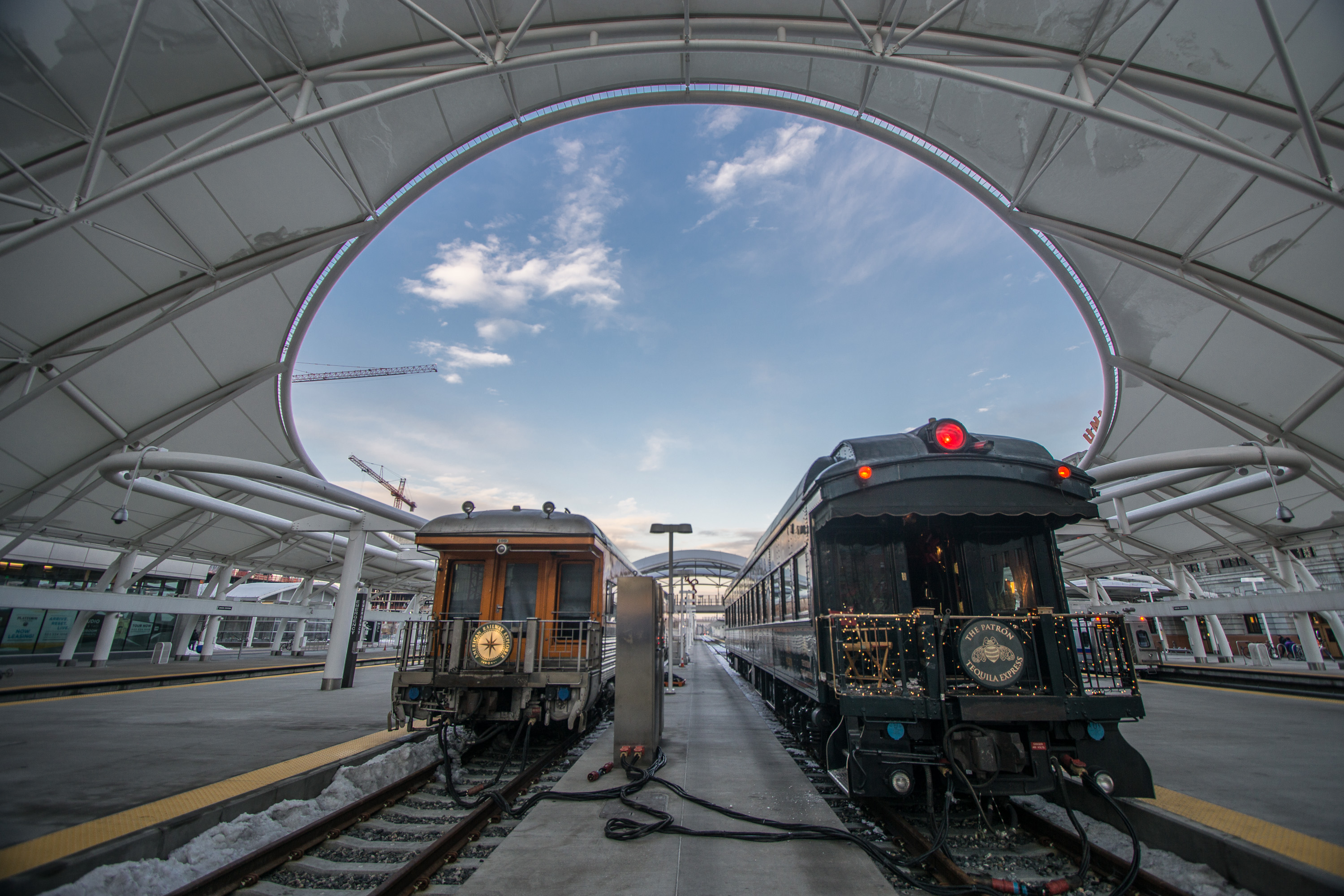
Two private railroad cars at Denver Union Station in December 2015

A private railroad car, private railway coach, private car, private varnish, or business car is a railroad passenger car either originally built or later converted for service as a business car for private individuals. A private car could be added to the make-up of a train or pulled by a private locomotive, providing privacy for its passengers. They were used by railroad officials and dignitaries as business cars, and wealthy people for travel and entertainment, especially in the United States. They were sometimes used by politicians in "whistle stop campaigns". Pay cars with less opulent sleeping and dining facilities were used by a paymaster and assistants to transport and disburse cash wages to railway employees in remote locations without banking facilities.

== History ==
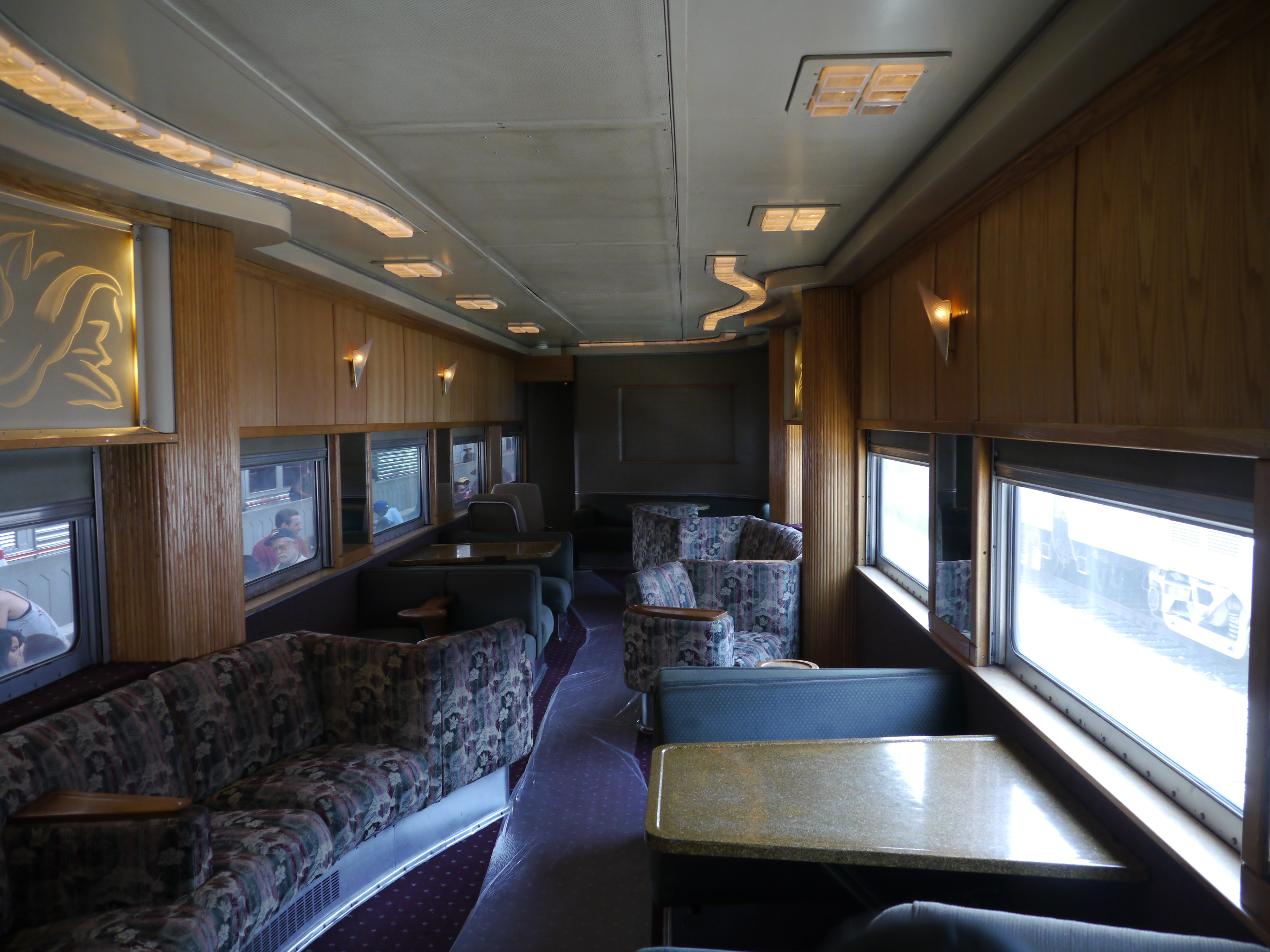
Interior of a private coach

In the late 19th century Gilded Age, wealthy people had finely appointed private cars custom-built to their specifications. Additionally many cars built by Pullman, Budd, and other companies that were originally used in common carrier service as passenger cars were later converted for use as business and private cars. There are various configurations, but the cars generally have an observation platform, a full kitchen, dining room, state rooms, secretary's room, an observation room, and often servant's quarters.

Railroad barons, including Leland Stanford, had their private cars. Abraham Lincoln disliked the ornate railroad car supplied for his service as president: he rode in it only in his coffin. Private cars were more common in the heyday of passenger rail service and during the pre-Amtrak era (before 1971). At its peak in the early 20th century, an estimated 2,000 private cars were in use. Such carriages were extremely rare in the United Kingdom, although a notable example was the Duke of Sutherland's saloon, which is preserved at the National Railway Museum in York. In the 21st century, some private cars have survived the decades and some are used for tour rides, leasing for private events, etc. Others are on static display. A small number of private cars (along with other types of passenger cars), have been upgraded to meet current Amtrak regulations, and may be chartered by their owners for private travel attached to Amtrak trains.

Dedicated railroad buffs rescued some private varnish cars from scrapping. Chartering of these formerly private cars has become a sideline in the upscale travel industry, with its own niche magazine Private Varnish, which ceased publication in 2019. Amtrak regulations require head-end power and train control wiring, though some cars generate their own power and can run on freight lines as well. Most restored private cars have been rebuilt to newer specifications.

In the 21st century private coaches are very rarely used anywhere in the world, though in some countries a coach of this kind can be chartered for vacations, business meetings or other such occasions needing the privacy of a dedicated coach. As the capacity of rail transport is large, it takes special operations to include a private coach in an otherwise public train. A railcar might be better suited for this kind of luxury, but the timetables of normal operations limit the accessibility of locations along the tracks. Amtrak has increasingly-stringent regulations on allowing private cars on its trains, and reserves the right to refuse any movement.

== Other specific examples ==
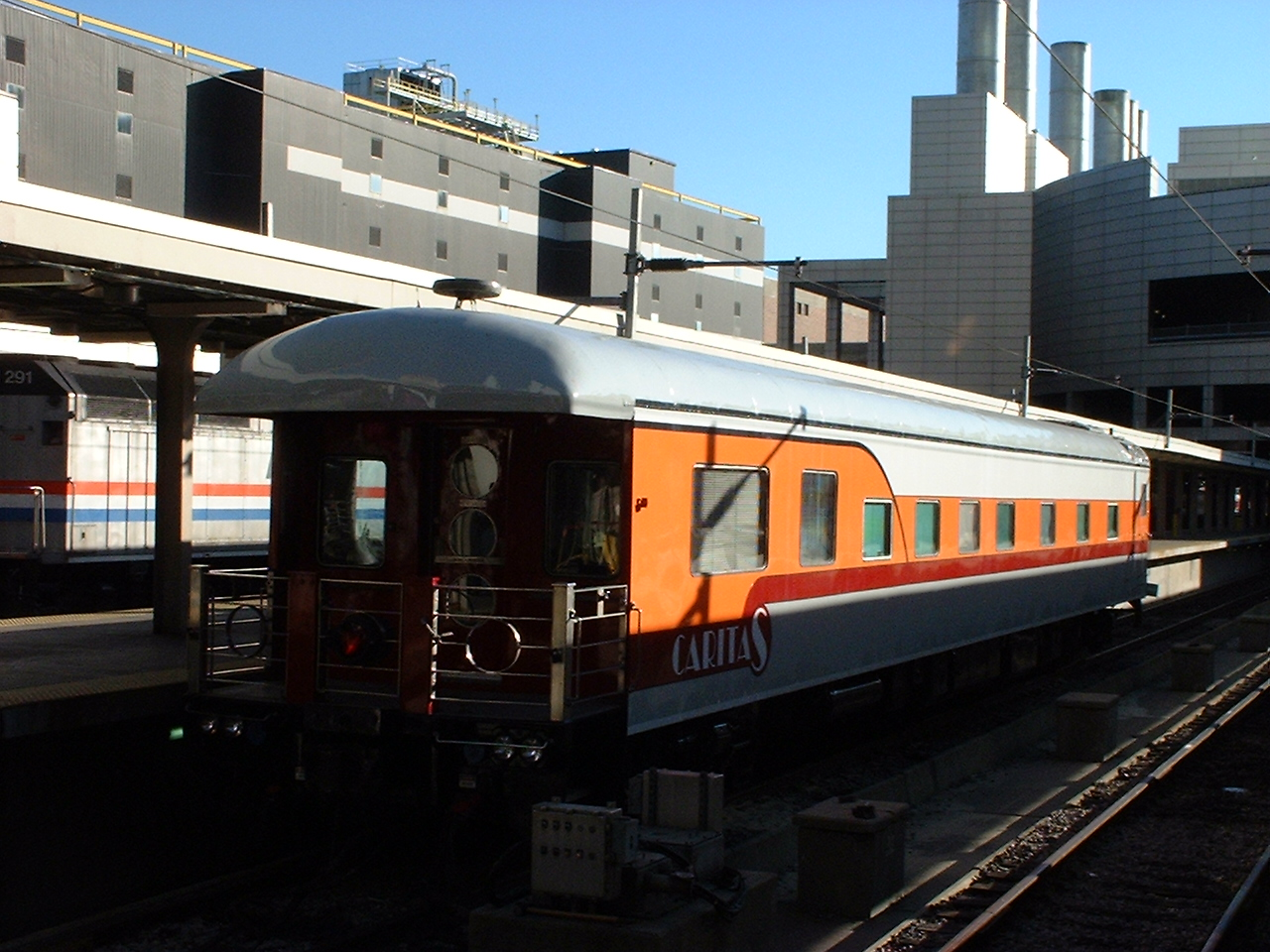
Private car Caritas at Boston's South Station in 2001

Lucius Beebe and his life partner Charles Clegg owned two private railroad cars, the Gold Coast and the Virginia City. Beebe's book Mansions on Rails: The Folklore of the Private Railway Car (Berkeley, California: Howell-North, 1959) presented the first history of the private railroad car in the U.S. The Gold Coast is now in the collection of the California State Railroad Museum. The Virginia City and the Redwood Empire are available for private charter.

The Survivor was a private railroad car built by the American Car and Foundry Company in 1926 for Jessie Woolworth Donahue, the heiress to Frank Winfield Woolworth. The car was used by the Woolworth family from 1926 through 1939, transporting the family to French Lick, Pinehurst, the Greenbrier and Palm Beach. The car is reputed to have been the courtship car of Mrs. Donahue's niece, Barbara Hutton, and Cary Grant. The current owner Dante Stephensen purchased the car in 1982 and has progressively restored it, renaming it The Survivor. It is based in Atlanta, Georgia.

== Private cars ==
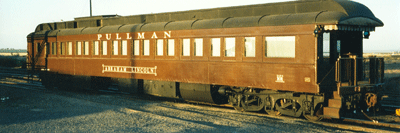
The Abraham Lincoln, a heavyweight Pullman business car

- Abraham Lincoln
- Dover Harbor
- Ferdinand Magellan
- Georgia 300
- Patrón Tequila Express
- Roald Amundsen
- Wisconsin

== See also ==
- Funeral train
- Royal train
- Private railway station
