= Dover Harbor (Pullman car) =

Dover Harbor 6-bedroom buffet-lounge
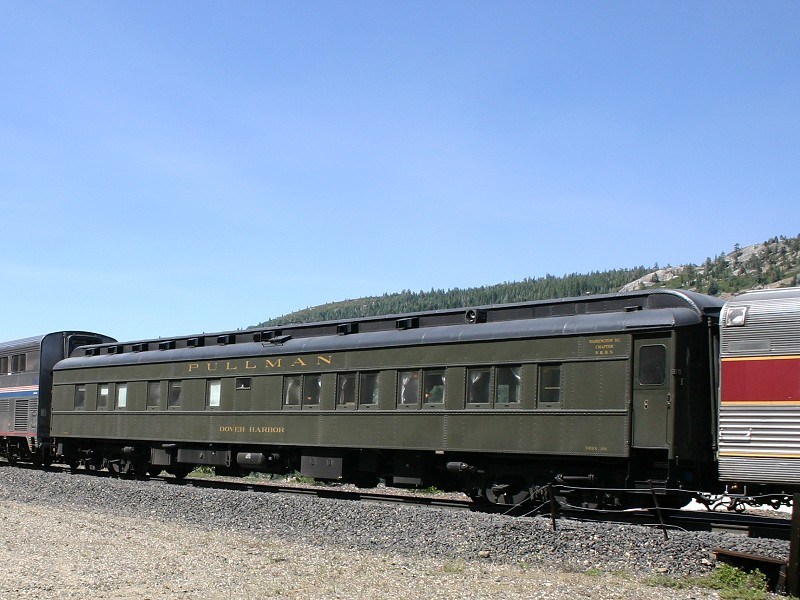
- Dover Harbor in transit
- Manufacturer: Pullman
- Order no.: Lot 4968
- Constructed: 1923
- Refurbished: 1934
- Diagram: Plan 4015
- Capacity: 12 in 6 bedrooms 14-seat lounge

Specifications
- Weight: 87 short tons (79 t)
- Auxiliaries: 32 Volt
- HVAC: Mechanical
- Bogies: Type 2410A
- Braking system: Type UC
- Track gauge: 4 ft 8 1/2 in (1,435 mm)

The Dover Harbor sleeper-buffet-lounge is among the oldest operating Pullman passenger cars in the United States. It is owned and operated by the non-profit National Railway Historical Society, Washington, D.C., Chapter, Inc. (DCNRHS).

== Construction and revenue use ==
The Pullman Company of Chicago built the heavyweight railroad car Maple Shade in July 1923. The car was originally configured as a combine-baggage-library car, with four sleeping sections, a lounge, a barber shop, and a baggage area. It operated on the Pennsylvania Railroad's name trains, including the Broadway Limited and the Spirit of St. Louis.

In March 1934, Pullman recalled the Maple Shade to its shops, where the company rebuilt the car as a sleeper-buffet-lounge and renamed it Dover Harbor. The rebuild added six double bedrooms, a buffet kitchen, and a 14-seat lounge. With its new air conditioning, Dover Harbor weighed 87 tons.

After the renovation, Dover Harbor operated in revenue and pool service for 31 years. It ran on trains including the New York Central's Cleveland Limited and Knickerbocker, and the Boston & Maine's Montrealer and Washingtonian. The Pullman Company retired Dover Harbor to its Calumet, Illinois, shops in 1965.

== Retirement and restoration ==
The Pullman Company sold Dover Harbor in 1968. After Dover Harbor passed through the hands of four private owners, the non-profit National Railway Historical Society, Washington, D.C., Chapter, Inc. (DCNRHS) purchased the car in November 1979.

DCNRHS volunteers and contractors restored the car to its 1934 appearance, with a Pullman green exterior and a period interior. After a series of safety upgrades, Dover Harbor became Amtrak certified in May 1986. DCNRHS operates Dover Harbor on public excursions and private charters from Washington Union Station.
