= List of horse shows =

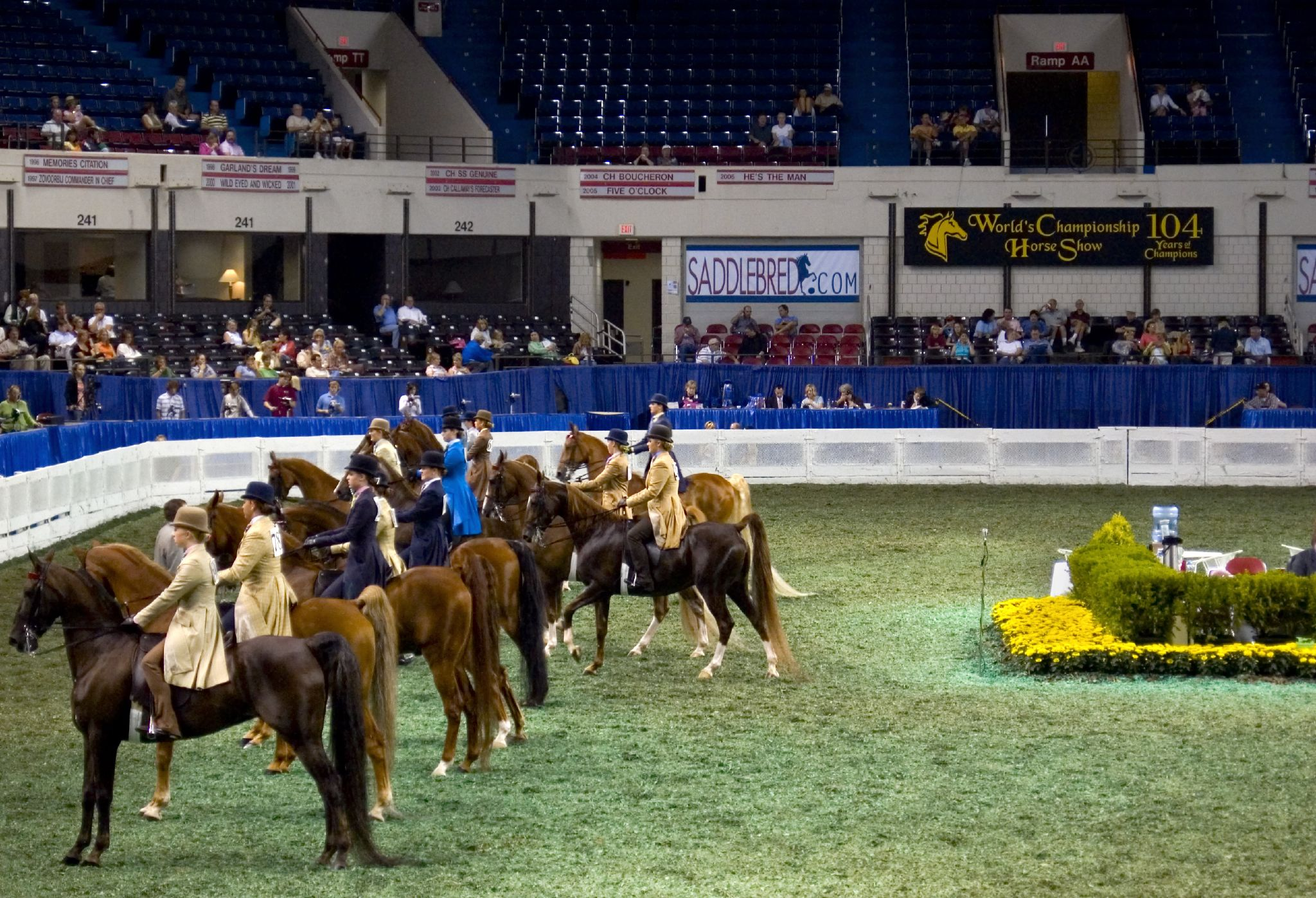
Horses and riders at a horse show in the United States.

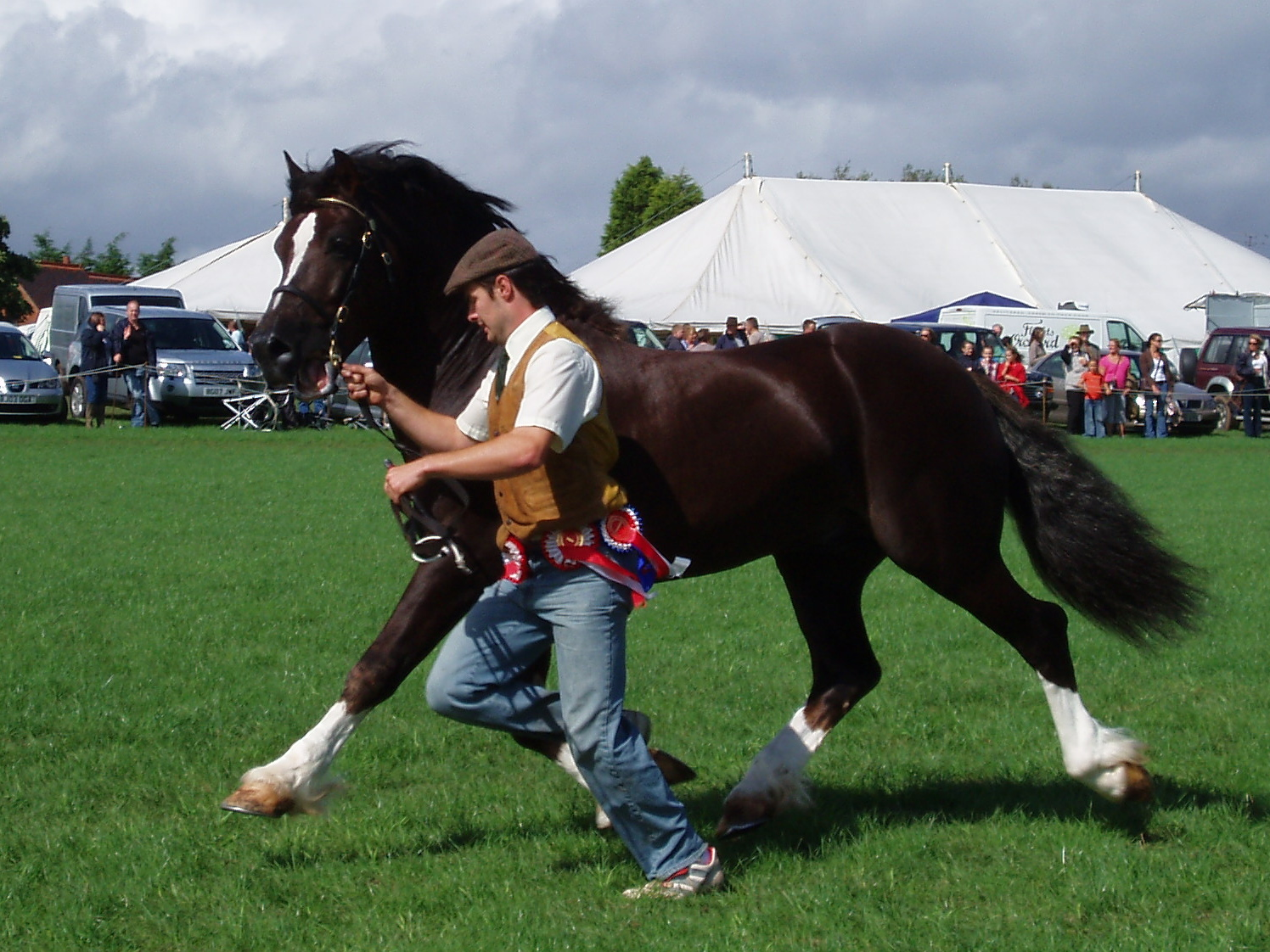
A horse and handler at an outdoor show in the United Kingdom.

A horse show is an event taking place over days or weeks, comprising competitions and displays in equestrian sports. These are lists of notable horse shows by country or geographical area.

== Australia ==
- Adelaide Equestrian Festival

== France ==
- Étoiles de Pau
- La Route du Poisson
- Saut Hermès

== Germany ==
- Celle State Stud § Stallion Parade
- CHIO Aachen
- Internationales Pfingstturnier Wiesbaden
- Luhmühlen Horse Trials
- Maimarkt-Turnier Mannheim

== Iceland ==
- National Competition of Horsemen

== Ireland ==
- Clifden Show
- Dublin Horse Show

== Netherlands ==
- CHIO Rotterdam
- Indoor Brabant
- Jumping Amsterdam

== Sweden ==
- Falsterbo Horse Show
- Goteborg Horse Show

== United Kingdom ==
- Cardiff Horse Show (historic)
- Horse of the Year Show
- London International Horse Show
- Royal Highland Show
- Royal International Horse Show
- Royal Welsh Show
- Royal Windsor Horse Show
- South of England Show

== United States ==
- All American Quarter Horse Congress
- American Royal Horse Show
- Devon Horse Show
- Grand National and World Championship Morgan Horse Show
- Hampton Classic Horse Show
- Junior Hunter Finals
- Kentucky State Fair World's Championship Horse Show
- Lexington Junior League Horse Show
- Missouri Fox Trotting Horse World Show and Celebration
- Monmouth County Horse Show
- National Horse Show
- Racking Horse World Celebration
- Scottsdale Arabian Horse Show
- Sussex County Farm and Horse Show
- Tennessee Walking Horse National Celebration
- Upperville Colt & Horse Show
- Wartrace Horse Show
- Winter Equestrian Festival

== See also ==
- List of horse races
