= National Competition =

National Competition may refer to:

- NZRL Men's National Competition, the top-level rugby league competition in New Zealand.
- National Competition Council, an Australian research and advisory body.
- National Competition of Horsemen, an Icelandic horse racing and breeding exhibition.
- National Competition Policy (India)
- National Competition Policy (Australia)
