= West End, Monmouth County, New Jersey =

Place in Monmouth County, New Jersey, United States

West End, New Jersey
- Unincorporated community
- Second Avenue in West End

- Location of West End in Monmouth County Inset: Location of county within the state of New Jersey West End (New Jersey) West End (the United States)
- Coordinates: 40°17′10″N 73°59′54″W
- Country: United States
- State: New Jersey
- County: Monmouth
- City: Long Branch
- Elevation: 26 ft (7.9 m)
- Time zone: UTC−05:00 (Eastern (EST))
  - Summer (DST): UTC−04:00 (EDT)
- GNIS feature ID: 882594

West End is an unincorporated community located within Long Branch in Monmouth County, New Jersey, United States. The township was the host of the Long Branch Horse Show at the Hollywood Park Racetrack in 1917.

== Notable people ==
People who were born in, residents of, or otherwise closely associated with Long Branch include:

- Harry F. Guggenheim (1890–1971), businessman, diplomat, publisher, philanthropist, aviator, and horseman
- Norman Tanzman (1918–2004), politician who served in the New Jersey General Assembly from 1962 to 1968 and in the New Jersey Senate from 1968 to 1974.
