= Magnum Psyche =

Stud horse

- Breed: Arabian
- Sire: Padrons Psyche
- Grandsire: Padron
- Dam: A Fancy Miracle
- Maternal grandsire: Sasaki
- Sex: Stallion
- Foaled: 1995
- Died: January 3, 2023
- Country: United States
- Color: Chestnut
- Breeder: Magnum Arabians
- Owner: Haras Mayad stud
- Trainer: David Boggs

Other awards
- U.S. Arabian National Champion Stallion

Magnum Psyche was a chestnut Arabian stallion bred by J. Lancaster Havice and foaled May 2, 1995. He is sired by Padrons Psyche and out of A Fancy Miracle. His grandsires are *Padron and *Sasaki. He is owned by the Haras Mayed stud near Buenos Aires Argentina, which is owned by Fernando and Joaquin Santibanes. For many years he has stood at stud in the United States and is closely associated with the trainer David Boggs. Magnum Psyche died January 3, 2023.

Magnum Psyche has won a number of major championships in halter, including national champion stallion.

At the 2009 Scottsdale Arabian Horse Show, Magnum Psyche won the title.
