= Maimarktgelände =

Exhibition site in Mannheim, Germany

Coordinates: 49°28′09″N 8°31′32″E

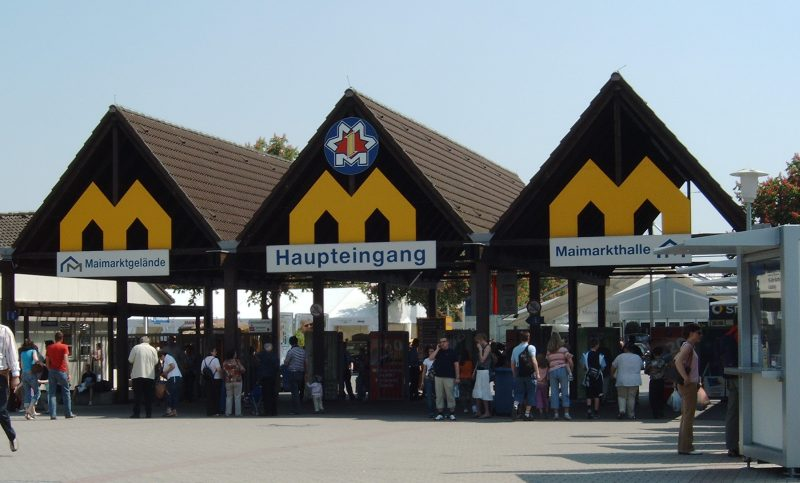
Main entrance (2006)

The Maimarktgelände (May Market Grounds) is an exhibition site located in Mannheim, Germany, which covers a surface of 225,000 m^{2}. It hosts the annual Mannheim May Market as well as open-air concerts and other events. Starting in April each year, 47 exhibition halls with a surface of 42,000 m^{2} are developed on the apron of the site. With approximately 1,500 exhibitors and around 400,000 visitors annually, the Maimarktgelände is a major German regional exhibition. In 1989, the 12,000-capacity Maimarkthalle (8100 m^{2}) was built as the first permanent exhibition hall, which is used all year round for concerts.

The area has good transport connections because the Mannheim motorway interchange is nearby and the A 656 and the B 38a can be reached directly. The Mannheim Arena/Maimarkt stop on the Rhine-Neckar S-Bahn is 1,000 m away. The park area enclosure has 12,000 parking bays and on Sundays and holidays parts of the neighboring Mannheim City Airport is available with around a further 8,000 parking bays.

== Notable events ==
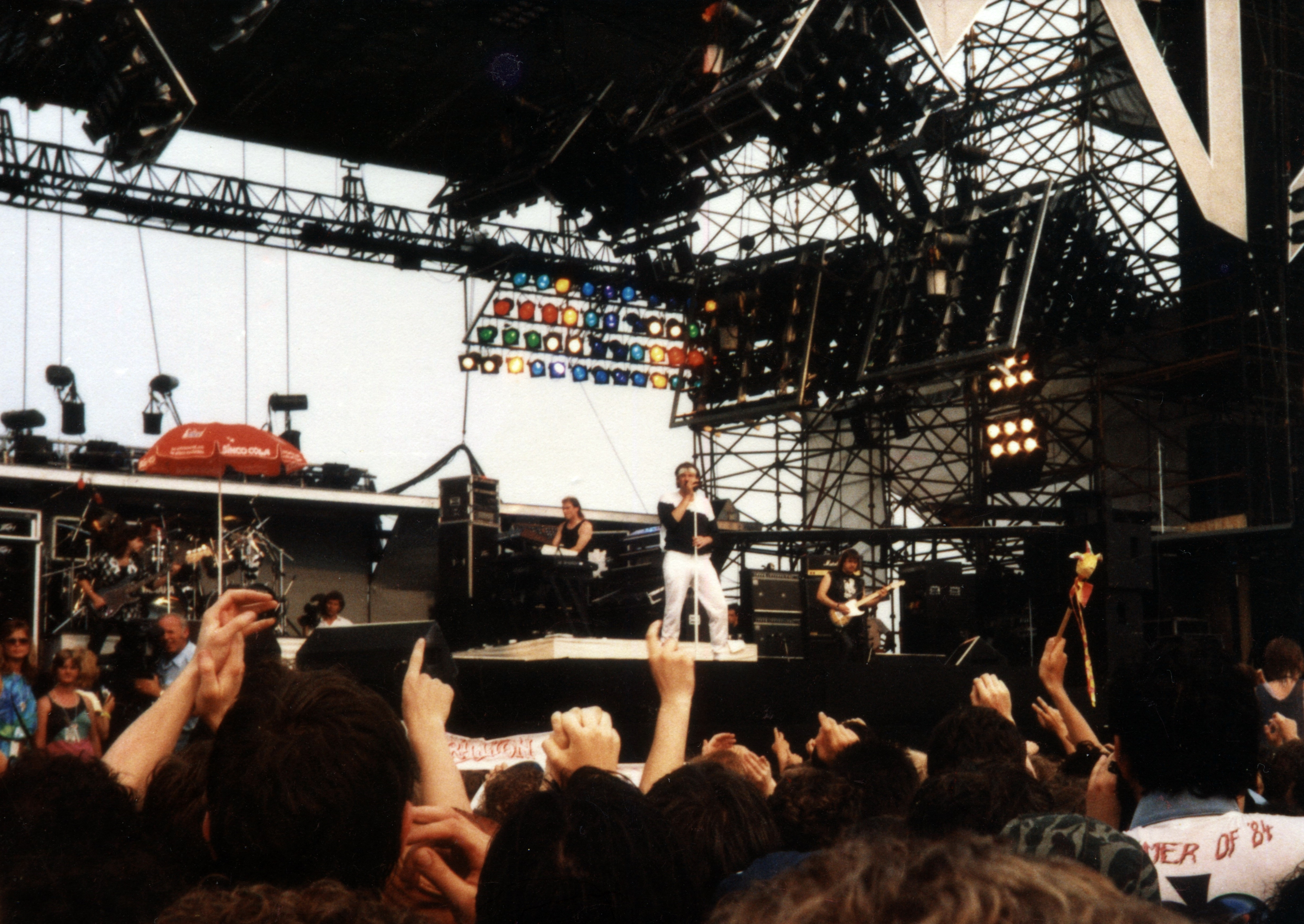
Open air concert: Marillion with singer Fish as a supporting act for Queen at the market place (1986)

Notable past performers have included Iron Maiden, Aerosmith, Anastacia, Bon Jovi, Queen, The Rolling Stones, U2, Metallica, Red Hot Chili Peppers, Dream Theater, Black Sabbath, Deep Purple, Pink Floyd, Guns N' Roses, ZZ Top, Prince and Genesis.

The Maimarkt-Turnier Mannheim is an annual international horse show held during the Mannheimer Maimarkt since 1964.
