= Maimarkt-Turnier Mannheim =

Annual international horse show

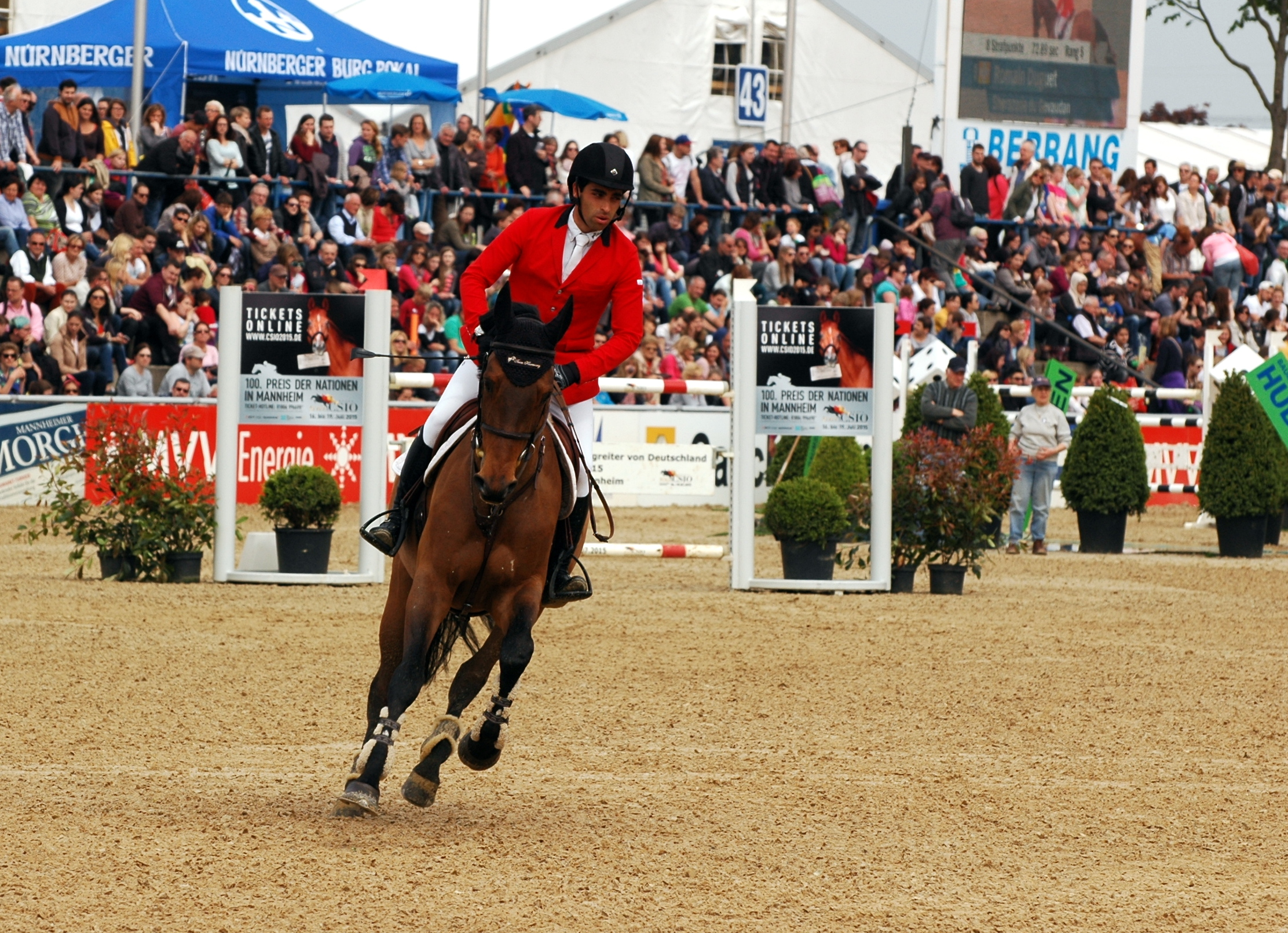
Jumping at Maimarkt-Turnier, 2015

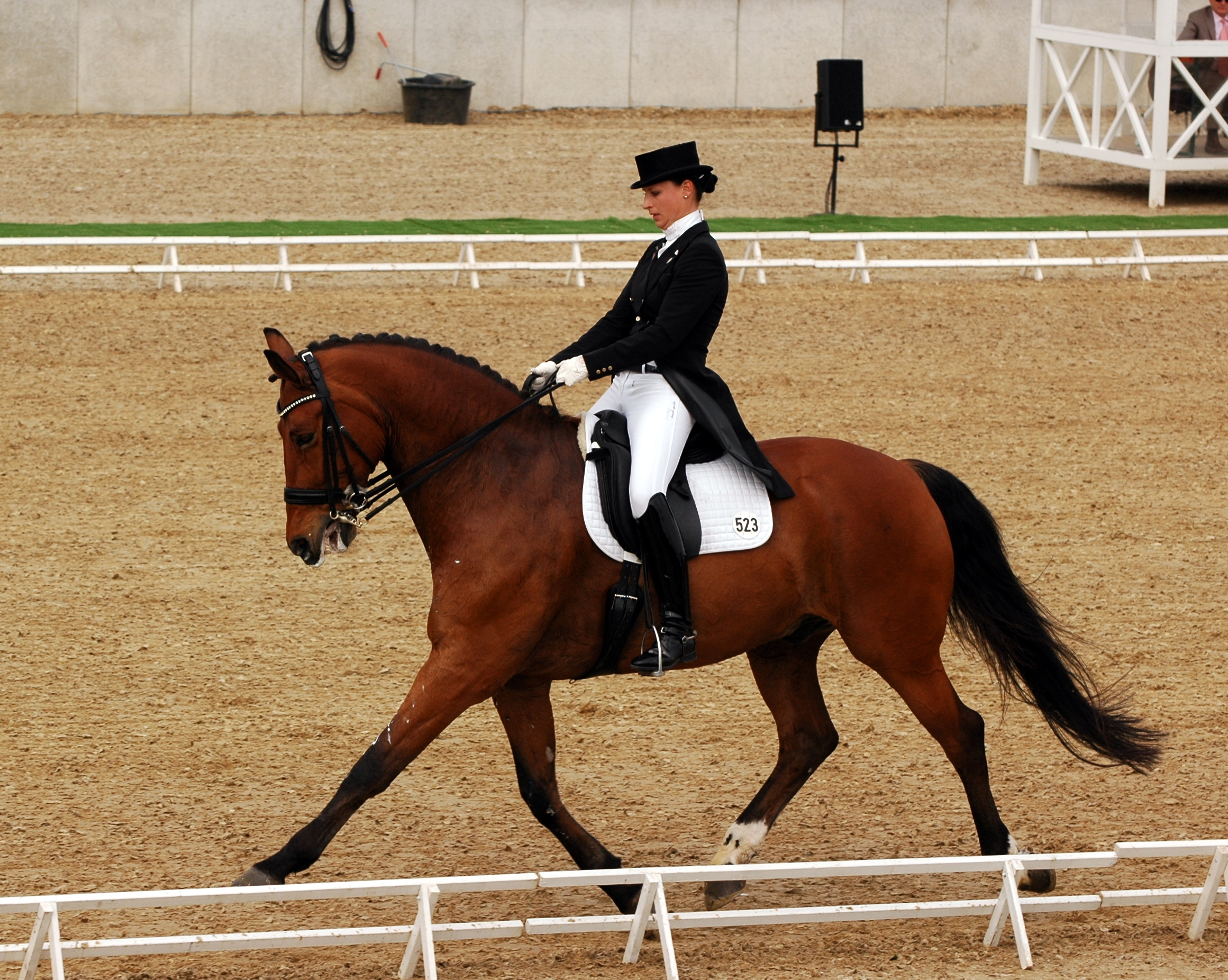
Dressage competition, 2015

The Maimarkt-Turnier Mannheim is an annual international horse show held during the Mannheimer Maimarkt since 1964. The show jumping competitions take place in the MVV-Reitstadion and the dressage competitions take place in the MVV-Dressurstadion in Mannheim, Germany, belonging to the Maimarktgelände.

The horse show is organised by the Reiter-Verein Mannheim e.V.

The main show jumping competitions are usually designed as CSI 3* and the main dressage competitions as CDI 4* (until 2017 CDI 3*). A para dressage competition and an arena polo tournament are also part of the event.
