= Missouri Fox Trotter =

American horse breed

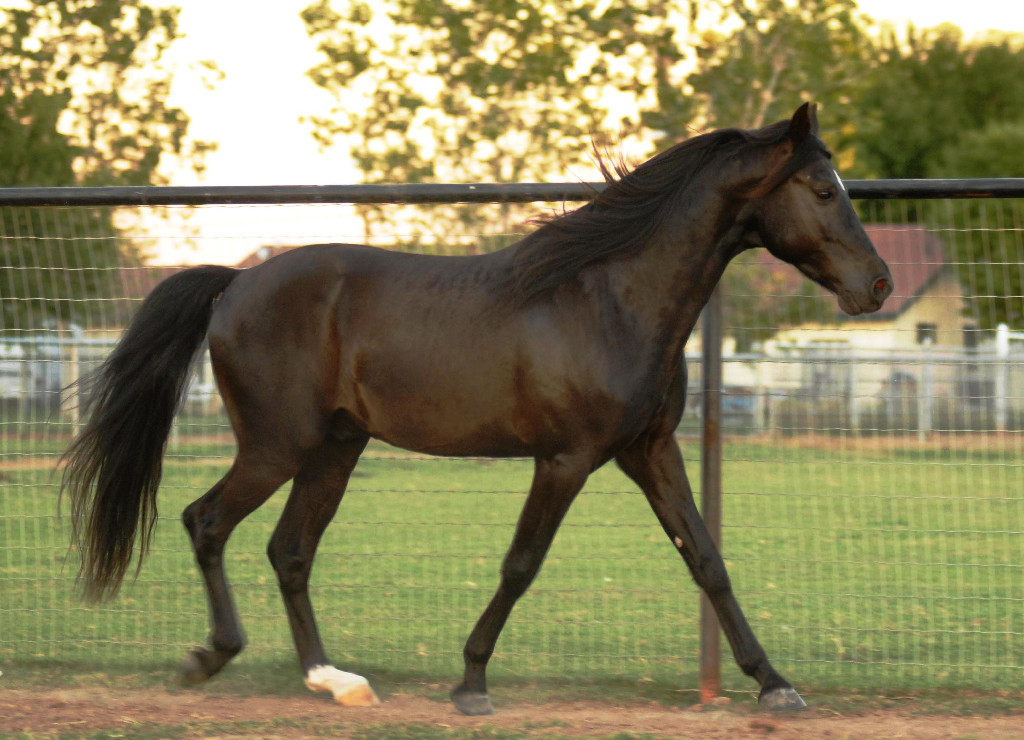
- Missouri Fox Trotter stallion
- Other names: MFT, Fox Trotter
- Country of origin: United States

Traits
- Distinguishing features: "Fox trot" gait, muscular, stock horse build

Breed standards
- Missouri Fox Trotting Horse Breed Association

The Missouri Fox Trotter is a horse breed that originated in the state of Missouri in the United States. It was developed in the Ozark Mountains by settlers in the early 19th century, and quickly developed into a gaited breed appreciated for its stock horse abilities, stamina and smooth gaits. It performs an ambling gait known as the "fox trot", a four-beat broken diagonal gait in which the front foot of the diagonal pair lands before the hind, eliminating the moment of suspension and increasing smoothness. The main breed registry was begun in 1948 and as of 2012 registers almost 100,000 horses. A European registry was begun in 1992, and as of 2009 recognizes around 600 Fox Trotters living in Europe. In 2006, a smaller registry, focused on the preservation of the original, historic type, was begun in the United States. The Fox Trotter is a mid-sized, muscular breed, used mainly for trail riding and ranch work.

== Breed characteristics ==
Missouri Fox Trotters stand 14 to 16 hands (56 to 64 inches, 142 to 163 cm) high, and weigh between 900 and 1,200 pounds (410 and 540 kg). Begun in 2004, the Missouri Fox Trotting Horse Breed Association also maintains a separate registry for fox trotting ponies standing between 11 and 14 hands (44 and 56 inches, 112 and 142 cm). Fox Trotters may be any solid color or pinto. White facial and leg markings are common. The facial profile is straight, set upon a neck of medium length that ends in pronounced withers. The breed is muscular, with sloped shoulders, a short back and sturdy legs.

The Missouri Fox Trotter performs an ambling gait known as the "fox trot", which replaces the trot seen in many other breeds. The fox trot is a four-beat broken diagonal gait in which the front foot of the diagonal pair lands before the hind, eliminating the moment of suspension and giving a smooth, sure-footed ride. The gait is sometimes described as having the horse walk with the front feet and trot with the back. In a fox trot, the horse must keep one front foot on the ground at all times and display a sliding motion with the hind legs. The fox trot and the regular trot are both at a speed between a walk and a canter or gallop; ambling gaits are four-beat gaits, whereas the trot is a two-beat gait. The extra footfalls provide additional smoothness to a rider because the horse always has at least one foot on the ground. This minimizes movement of the horse's topline and removes the bounce of a two-beat gait, caused by a moment of suspension followed by the jolt of two feet hitting the ground as the horse shifts from one pair of legs to the other. The value of an intermediate speed is that the horse conserves energy. More than thirty horse breeds are "gaited", able to perform a four-beat ambling gait; some can also trot. A Missouri Fox Trotter, with rider, can maintain a speed of 5 to 8 miles per hour (8.0 to 12.9 km/h) while using the fox trot, and can cover short distances at up to 10 miles per hour (16 km/h). In comparison, the average medium trot speed is 6 to 8 miles per hour (9.7 to 12.9 km/h).

== History ==
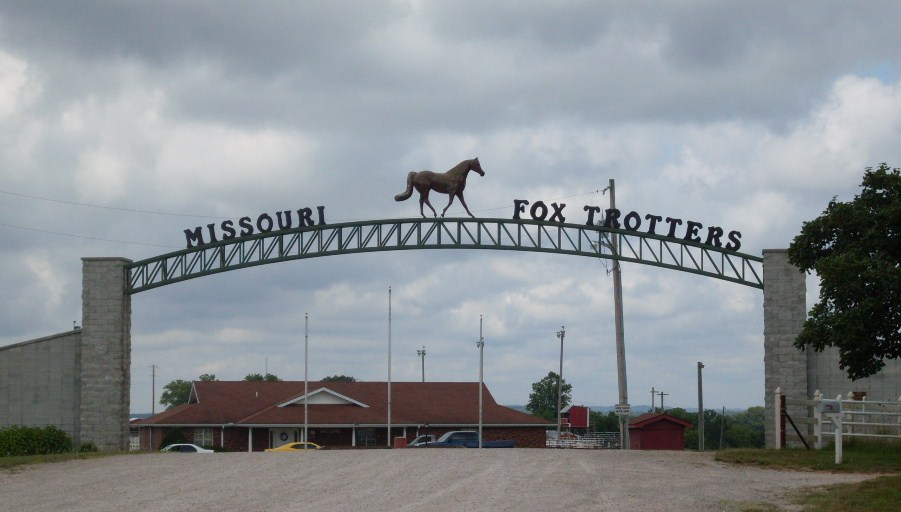
Entrance to the Missouri Fox Trotter showground north of Ava, Missouri

The Missouri Fox Trotter was developed from equine stock, including gaited horses, brought to Missouri by settlers from Tennessee, Kentucky and Virginia. Breeds that contributed to the Fox Trotter included the Arabian, Morgan, American Saddlebred, Tennessee Walking Horse and Standardbred. By the time of Missouri's statehood in 1821, the horses of the state were known for their unique gait, which was useful in the rocky terrain of the Ozark Mountains. The breed became popular with cattlemen for their smooth gaits and ability to work with cattle. In 1948, the Missouri Fox Trotting Horse Breed Association (MFTHBA) was founded in Ava, Missouri, with an open stud book that registered all horses with the fox trot gait and other specified physical characteristics. The first Fox Trotters were exported to Europe in the 1950s, when the Queen of the United Kingdom imported several palomino-colored horses.

In 1982, the stud book was closed, allowing only horses from registered parents to be entered. The Fox Trotter became the official state horse of Missouri in 2002. Missouri Fox Trotters are seen throughout the United States, as well as in Canada and several European countries, and as of 2012 the MFTHBA had registered over 97,000 horses and counts over 8,000 current members.

In 1992, the European Missouri Fox Trotting Horse Association (EMFTHA) was formed as the Fox Trotter association for Europe and an affiliate of the MFTHBA. The first European Championship Show for the breed took place in 1996, and in 2010 the EMFTHA and the Free University of Berlin began working together to start a European stud book for the breed. As of 2009 there were approximately 600 Missouri Fox Trotters in Europe, with around 350 of these living in Germany.

In 2006, a new registry, the Foundation Foxtrotter Heritage Association (FFHA), was formed with a goal of preserving and promoting the original heritage type of Fox Trotter that was seen in the first 20 years of the MFTHBA registry, in large part through reducing the amount of Tennessee Walking Horse blood. The Tennessee Walker did not figure prominently in original Missouri Fox Trotter pedigrees, and so the FFHA, by restricting the amount of Walker blood, is attempting to develop horses that more closely resemble the original Fox Trotter type.

== Uses ==
Missouri Fox Trotters are used extensively by trail riders, who appreciate their gaits, stamina and weight-carrying abilities. They are also used in handicapped riding programs, and their smooth gait has proven useful for riders with minor physical disabilities. Crosses between Fox Trotter mares and donkey jacks are often made, creating mules with the fox trot gait that are used to carry hunters and trail riders, especially in the western United States. The US Forest Service also employs Fox Trotters for their speed, stamina and gait, and members of the breed were used to make the first horse-back descent of the north rim of the Grand Canyon.

Ava, Missouri hosts the largest annual Fox Trotter show, called the Missouri Fox Trotting Horse World Show and Celebration. Approximately 1400 horses compete there every year.
