= Missouri Fox Trotting Horse World Show and Celebration =

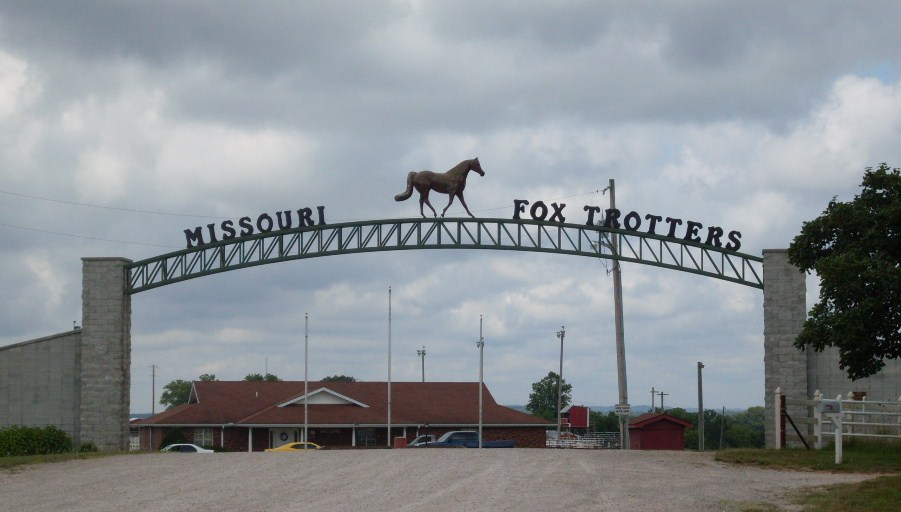
- Entrance to the Missouri Fox Trotter showground on Missouri Route 5 north of Ava, Missouri
- Sanctioning body: Missouri Fox Trotting Horse Breed Association
- Location: Ava, Missouri
- Held: Annually
- Inaugurated: 1958
- Breeds shown: Missouri Fox Trotter
- Largest honor: World Grand Championship
- Classes: Over 120
- Number of entries: 1400

The Missouri Fox Trotting Horse World Show and Celebration is the largest horse show for the Missouri Fox Trotter breed. Held annually in Ava, Missouri, the event includes approximately 1400 horses every year.

== History ==
The show was founded in 1958. It is held at Ava, Missouri, on the headquarters of the Missouri Fox Trotting Horse Breed Association. The Celebration begins on Labor Day every year and lasts six days, with the final night falling on a Saturday.

== Classes ==
The Celebration holds over 120 classes including both rail and versatility. Rail classes include model or halter, Western pleasure and English pleasure. Versatility classes include show jumping, barrel racing, and cattle sorting. There are trail obstacle classes as well as trail rides that leave from the show grounds daily. Approximately 1400 horses compete there each year. The largest class, held on the final Saturday night of the show, is the World Grand Championship.
