= Scottsdale Arabian Horse Show =

Arizona horse show

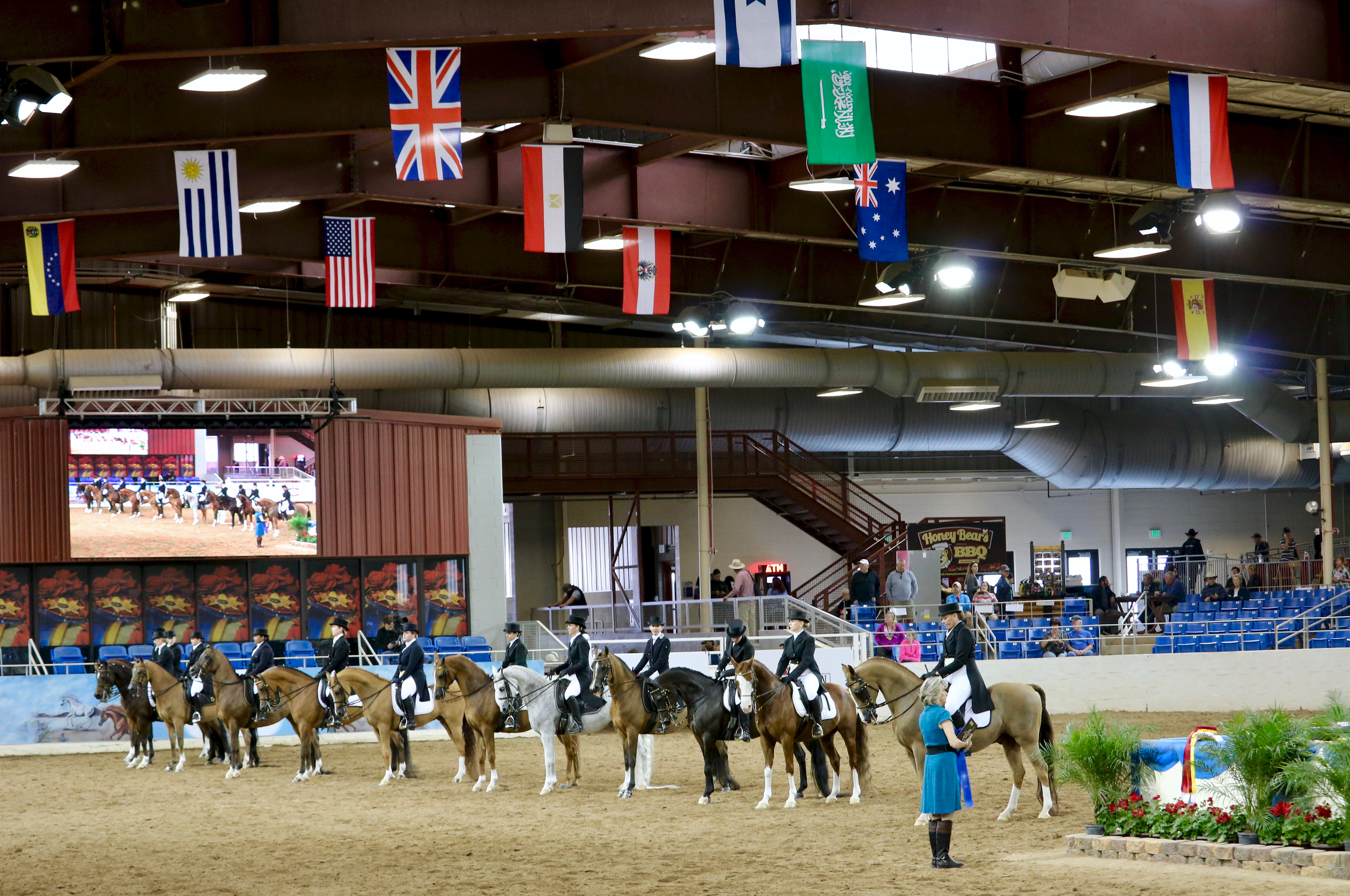
- Main Ring at WestWorld
- Sanctioning body: Arabian Horse Association
- Second sanctioning body: United States Equestrian Federation
- Location: Scottsdale, Arizona
- Held: Annually each February
- Length: 10 days
- Sponsors: Arabian Horse Association of Arizona
- Inaugurated: 1955
- Breeds shown: Arabian and Part-Arabian horses
- Number of entries: ≈2,300
- Website: scottsdaleshow.com

The Scottsdale Arabian Horse Show is the world's largest Arabian horse show, held annually in Scottsdale, Arizona. Beginning in 1955, the show has grown from 50 horses and a dozen trainers/owners to more than 2200 horses and over 1300 owners. Called the "Super Bowl of the Arabian World", it represents the first leg in the Arabian Triple Crown, the other two major competitions being the Canadian and U.S. National Arabian Championships. In addition to the competition, the show acts as a fundraiser for the Arabian Horse Association of Arizona, which has donated millions of dollars to charity from the proceeds of the show.

== The show ==
The first show was held in 1955 at the Arizona Biltmore Hotel, and was composed of approximately 50 horses from twelve farms. Anne McCormick, one of the founders, donated 150 acres of her ranch in Scottsdale so that the show could have a permanent home, naming it Paradise Park, and it remained there for many years before moving to its present location, WestWorld. The Arabian Horse Association of Arizona, with Ed Tweed as their president, sponsored the first show, which was then called the "All-Arabian Horse Show".

It is the largest Arabian horse show in the world, and one of the largest breed shows in the world. The show is sanctioned by the United States Equestrian Federation and the Arabian Horse Association. Called the "Super Bowl of the Arabian world", 2015 version marked the 60th anniversary of the show. The Diamond Jubilee of the event featured more than 2250 horses, and over $1 million in prize money, with over 1300 farms represented. The overall prize money increased to $3 million in 2021. It is the first of three legs of the "Arabian Triple Crown", the other two being the Canadian National Arabian Championship and the U.S. Nationals.

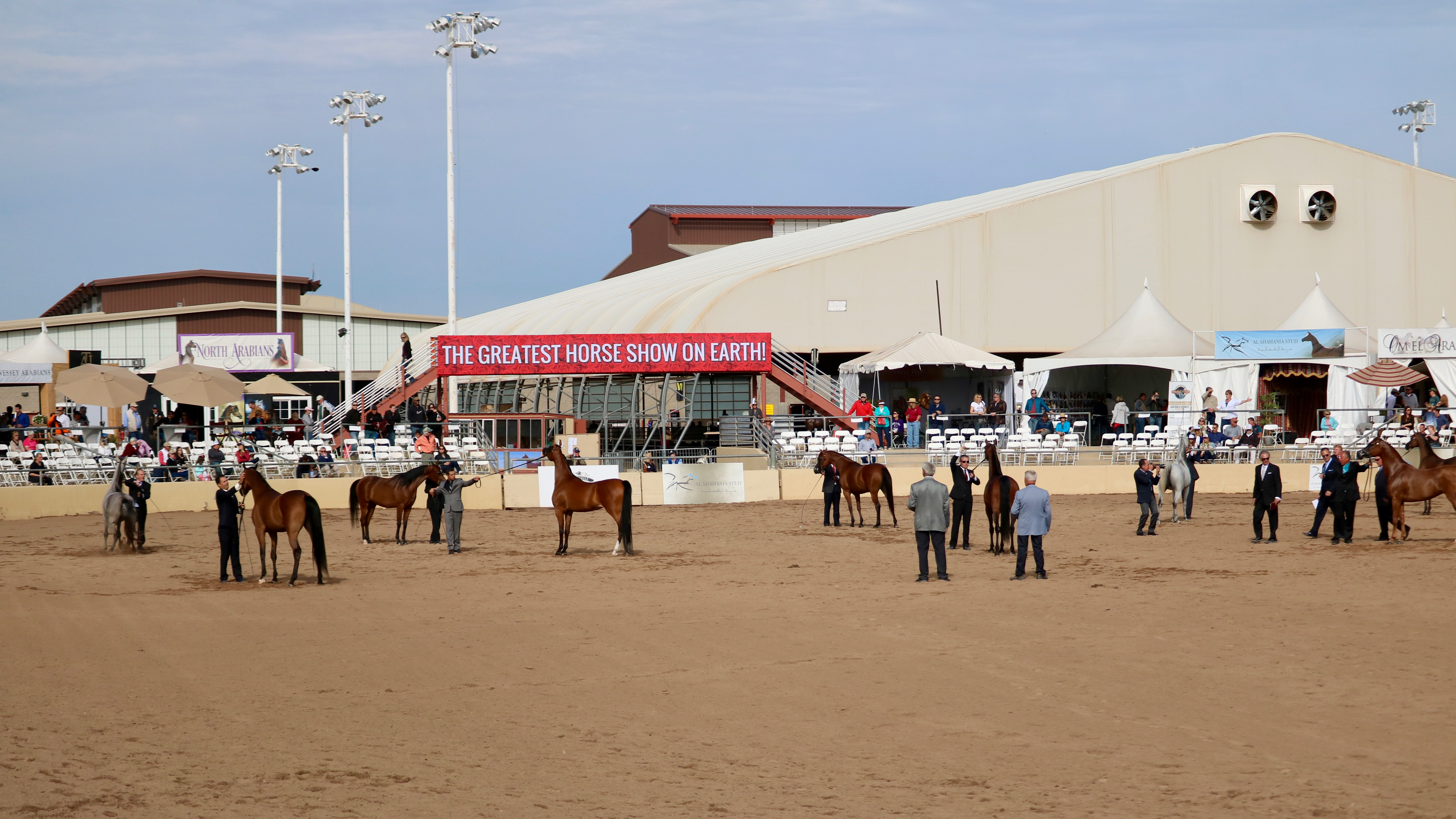
The Halter championships are the highlight of the Scottsdale show

As of 2015, the show consisted of competition in multiple divisions: Mounted Native Costume; Breeding/Halter; Dressage; Driving; working western (Reining, cutting, Working cow horse), English Pleasure (including show hack, park horse, and country English pleasure); Hunter/Jumper and hunter under saddle; Liberty (featuring a horse running free with accompanying music); and Western Pleasure as well as a youth division for most classes. The top prize of the show is "Scottsdale Supreme Halter Champion". This prize is given both to a mare and a stallion champion. Crowds at the event have exceeded 200,000. In 2015, over 320,000 visitors attended the 11 days of the event, with an additional 450,000 viewers around the world over a live television feed. A unique feature of the show is the user-friendly instructions which allow spectators to better understand the scoring system of the judges.

The event brings about $52 million to the Scottsdale economy. In 2013, the WestWorld facility underwent a $47 million facelift, which included indoor air-conditioned arenas.

In January 2015, the City of Scottsdale's WestWorld and The Arabian Horse Association of Arizona entered into an agreement to hold the show at WestWorld for the next 20 years. The show is highlighted in some of the colder climates as a way to get into warmer weather during the freezing temperatures of February in the northern U.S. In 2014, WestWorld unveiled a new light sculpture entitled "Impulsion", which was commissioned at a cost of $470,000. The statue is 40 feet long and 30 feet high, weighs over 1000 pounds, and was the work of Scottsdale artist Jeff Zischke.

Aside from the prizes for the competitors, the show is also a fundraiser for charities. Since its inception, the show has raised millions of dollars for such organizations as the Cox Charities and the March of Dimes.

== Competition ==
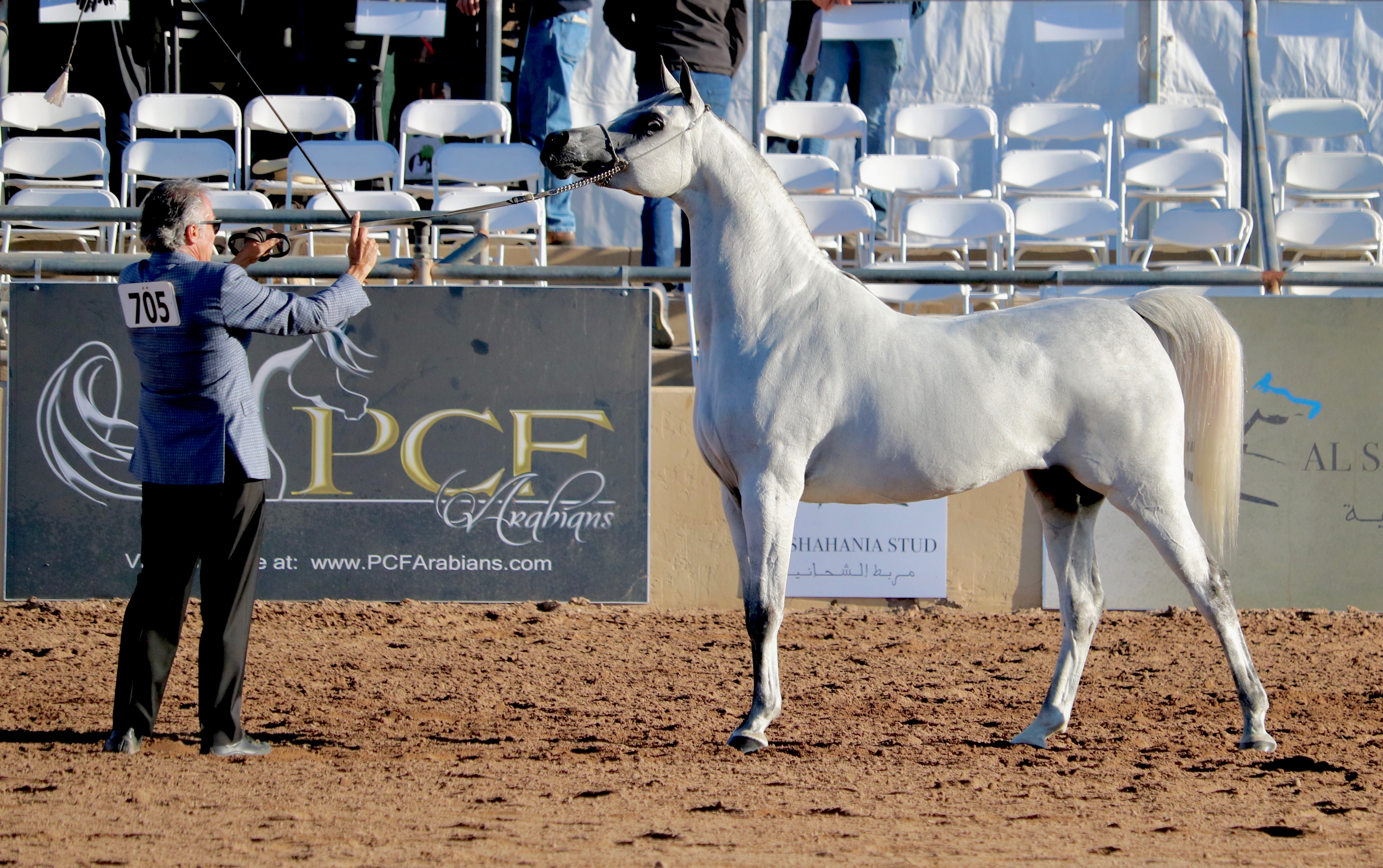
Halter championships

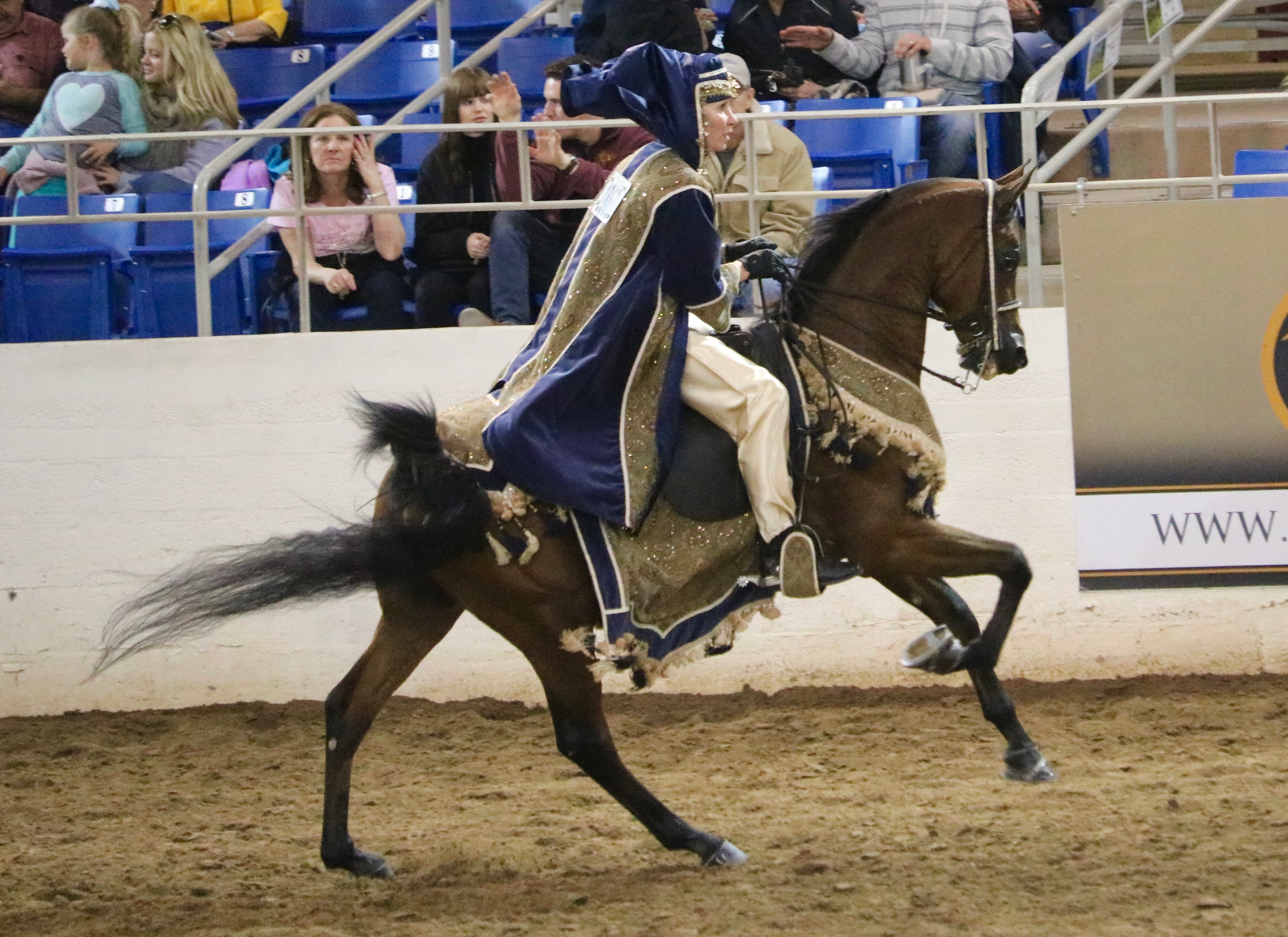
Mounted Native Costume

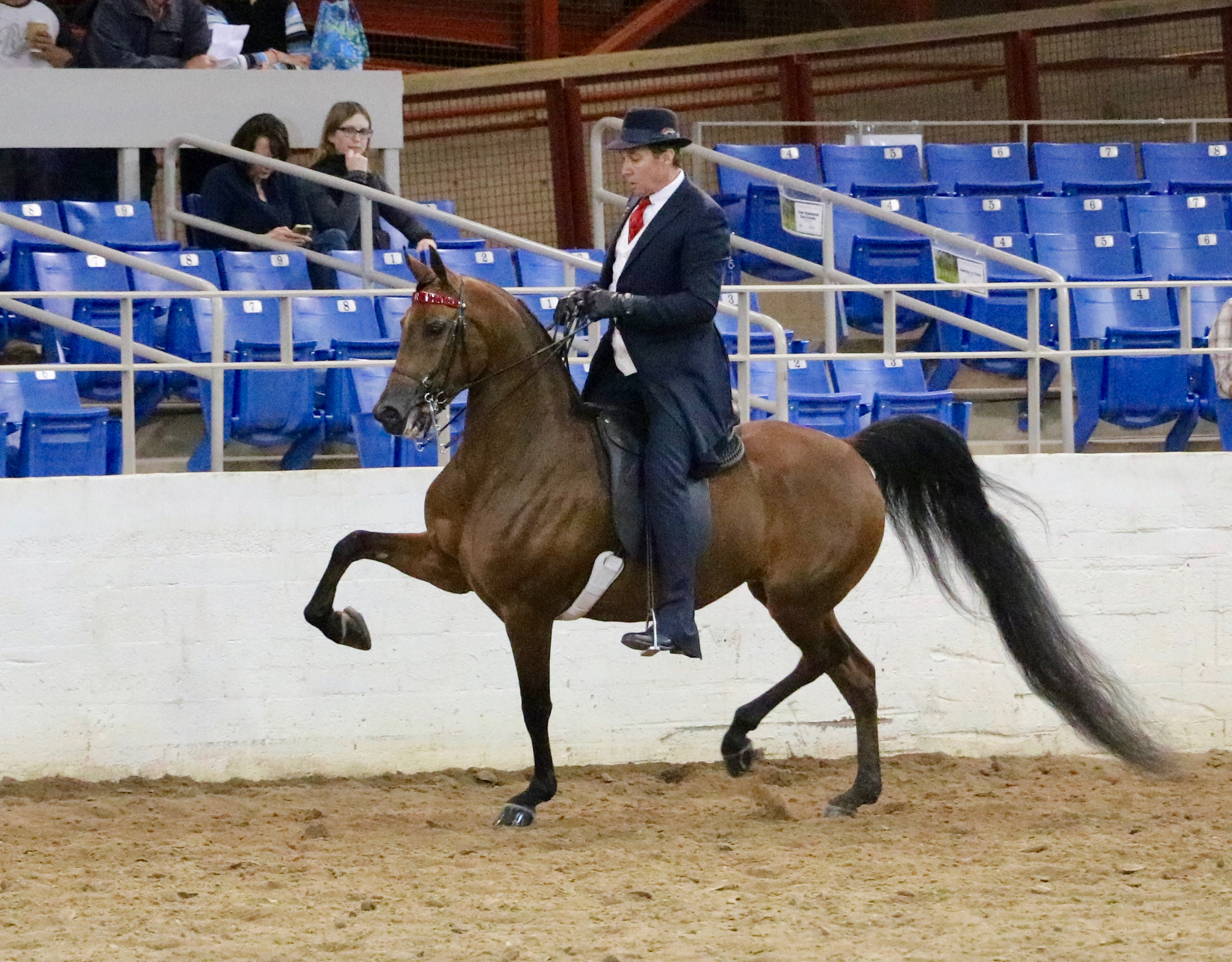
English pleasure

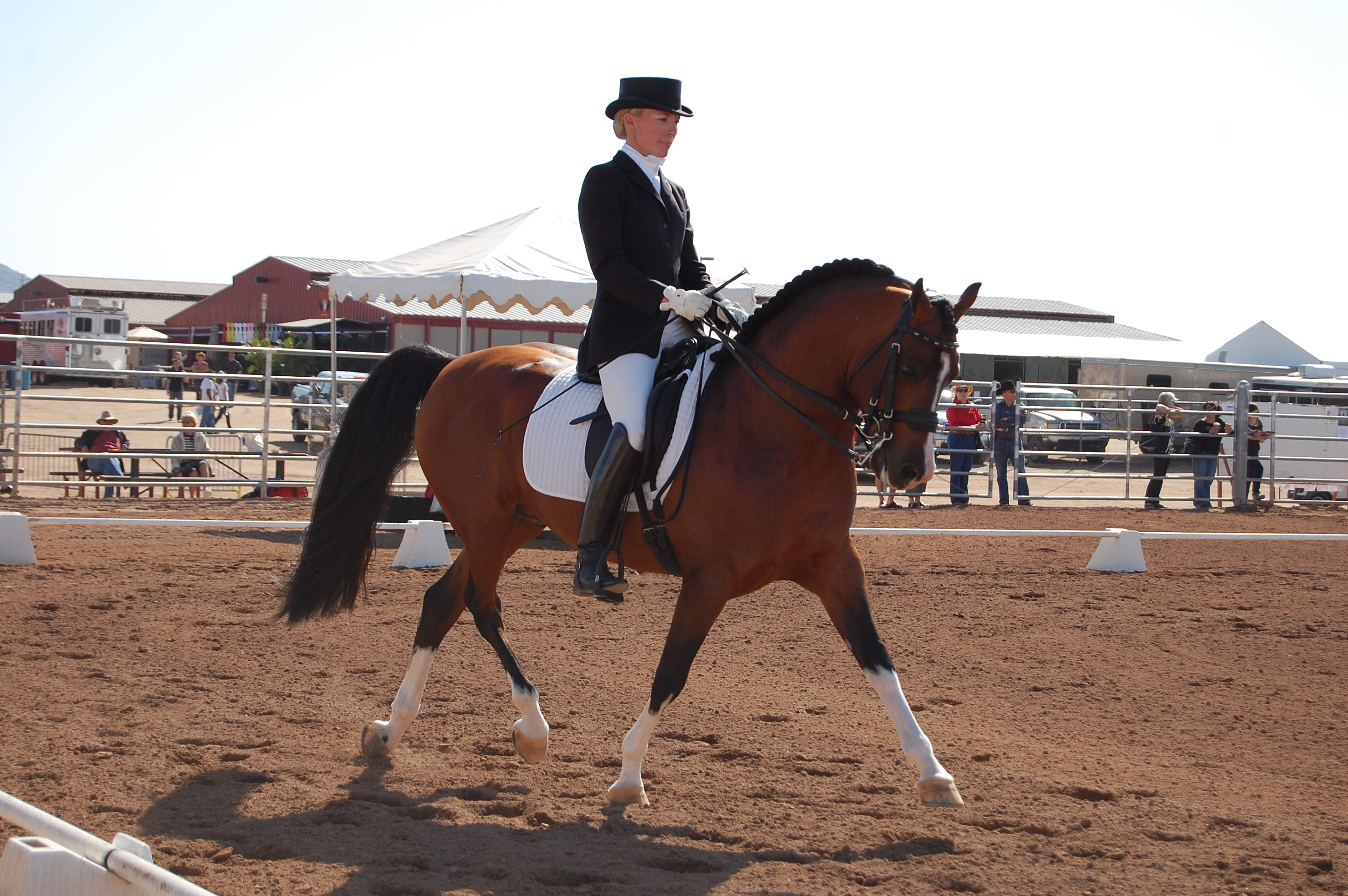
Dressage

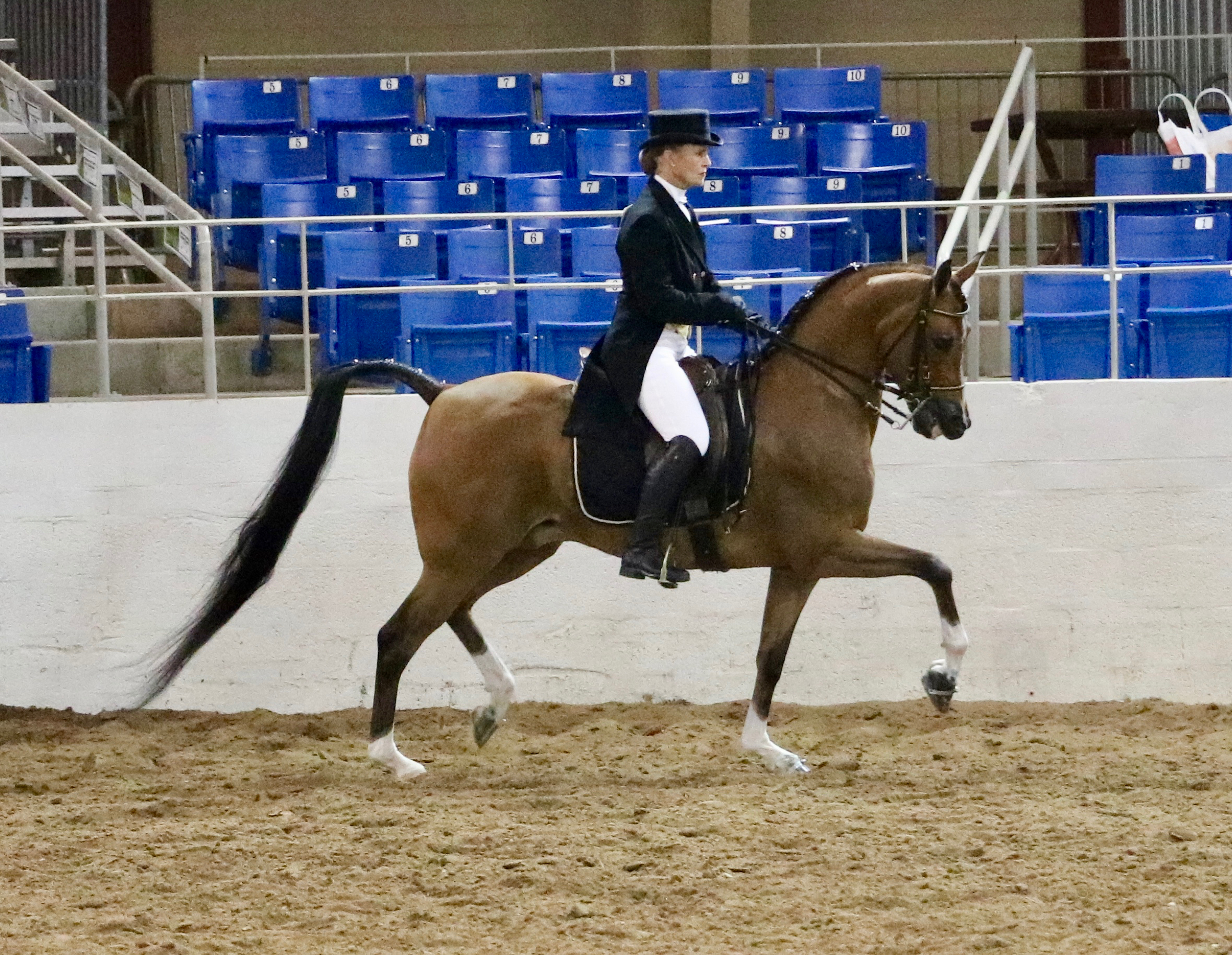
Show hack

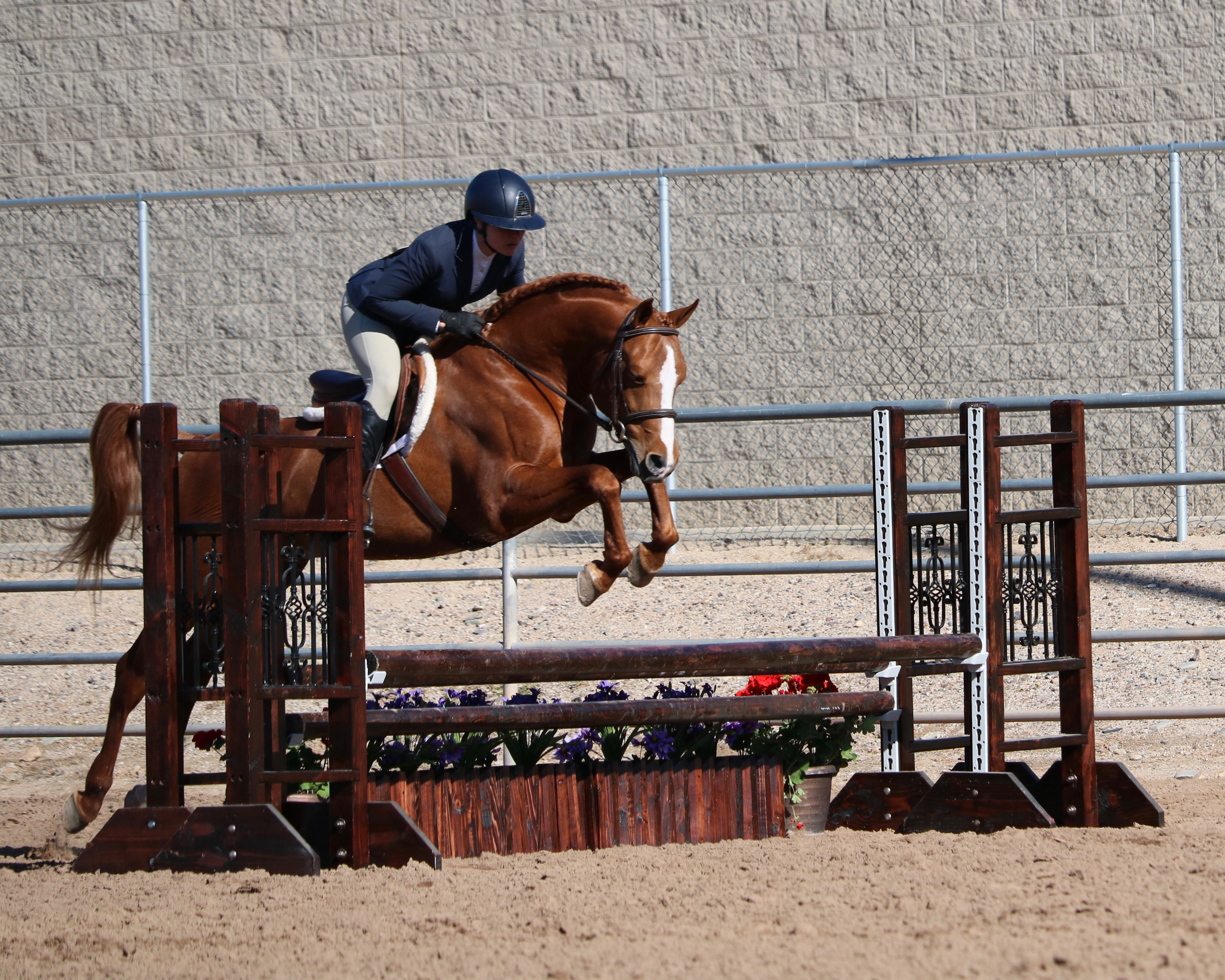
Hunter/Jumper

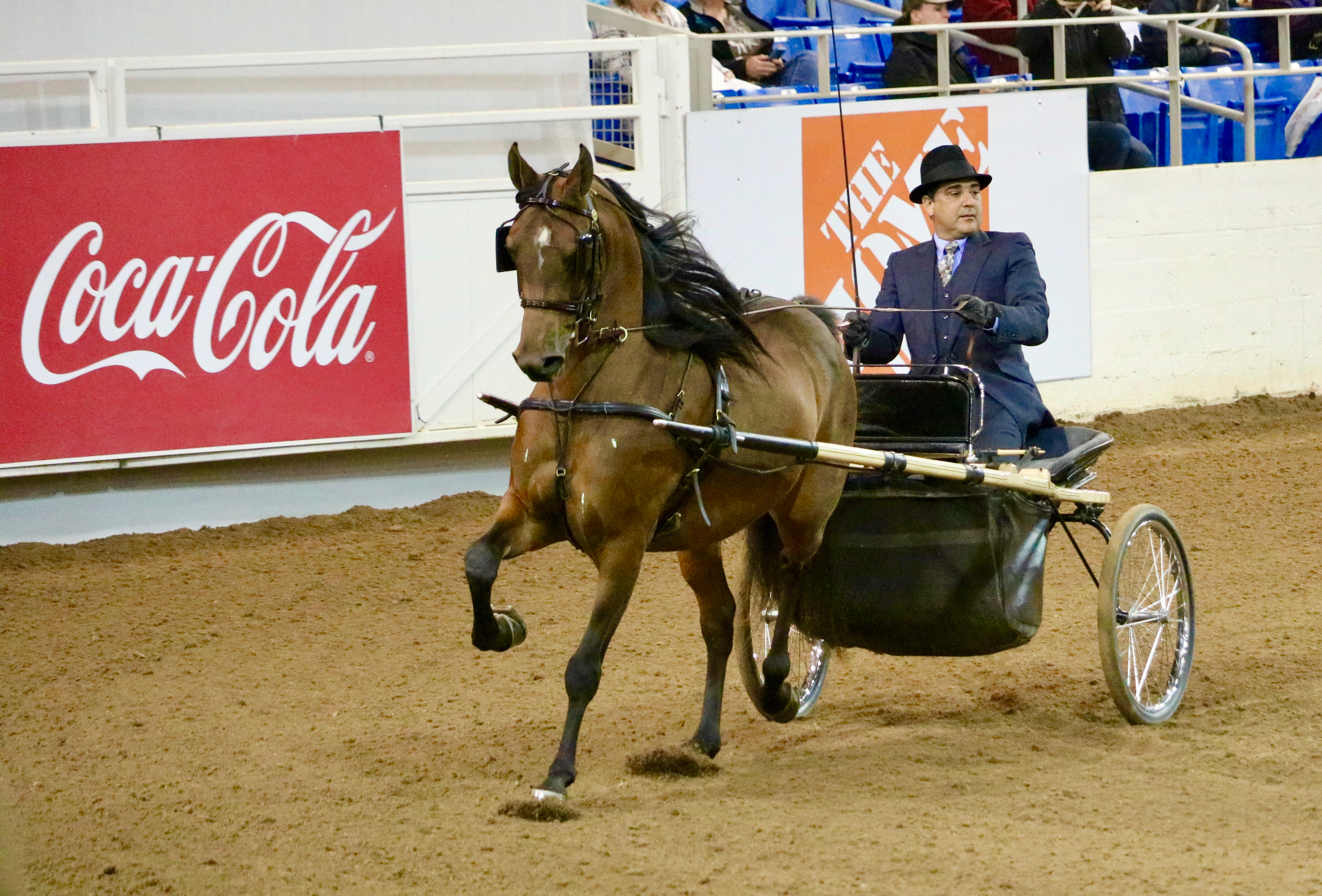
Pleasure driving

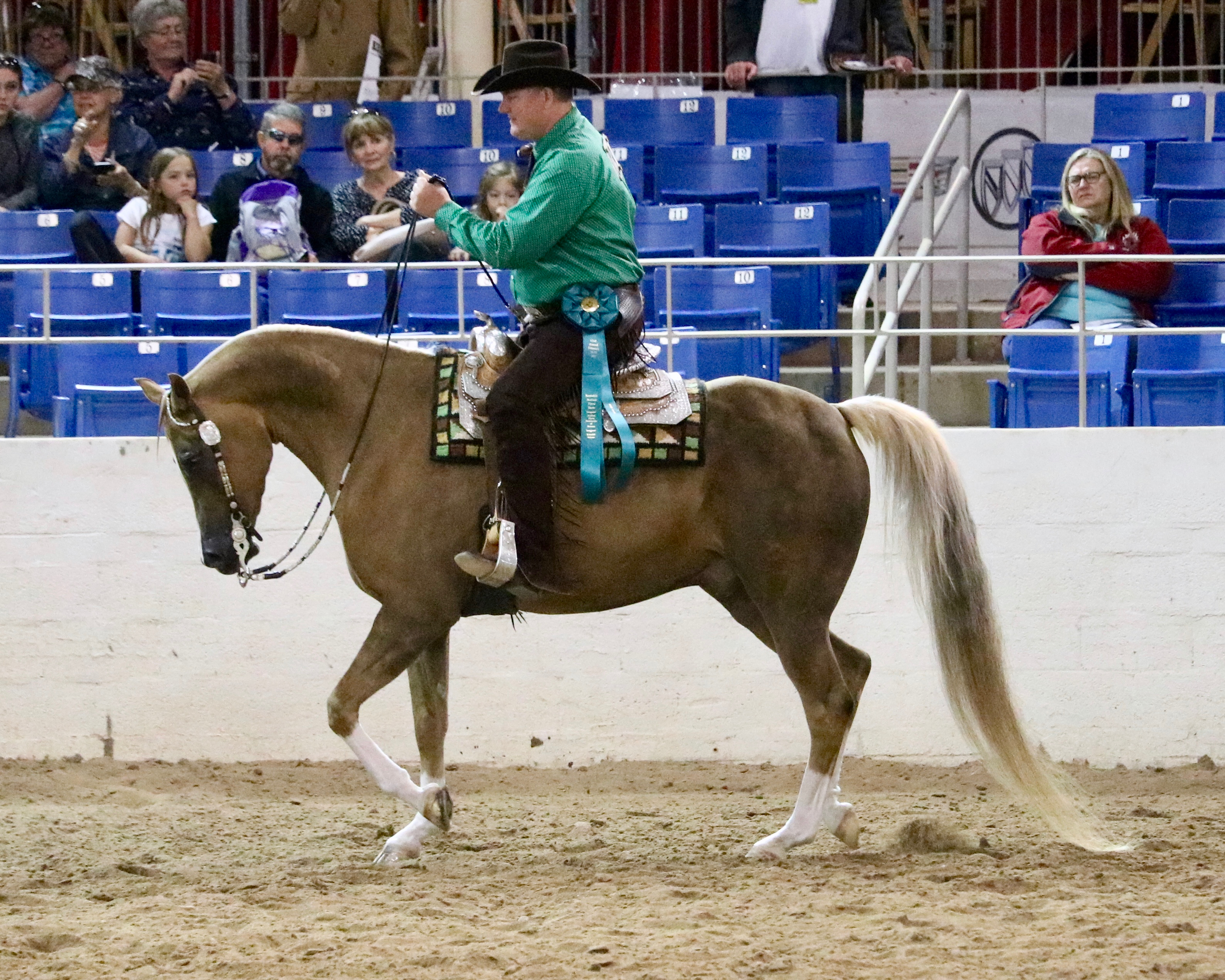
Western pleasure

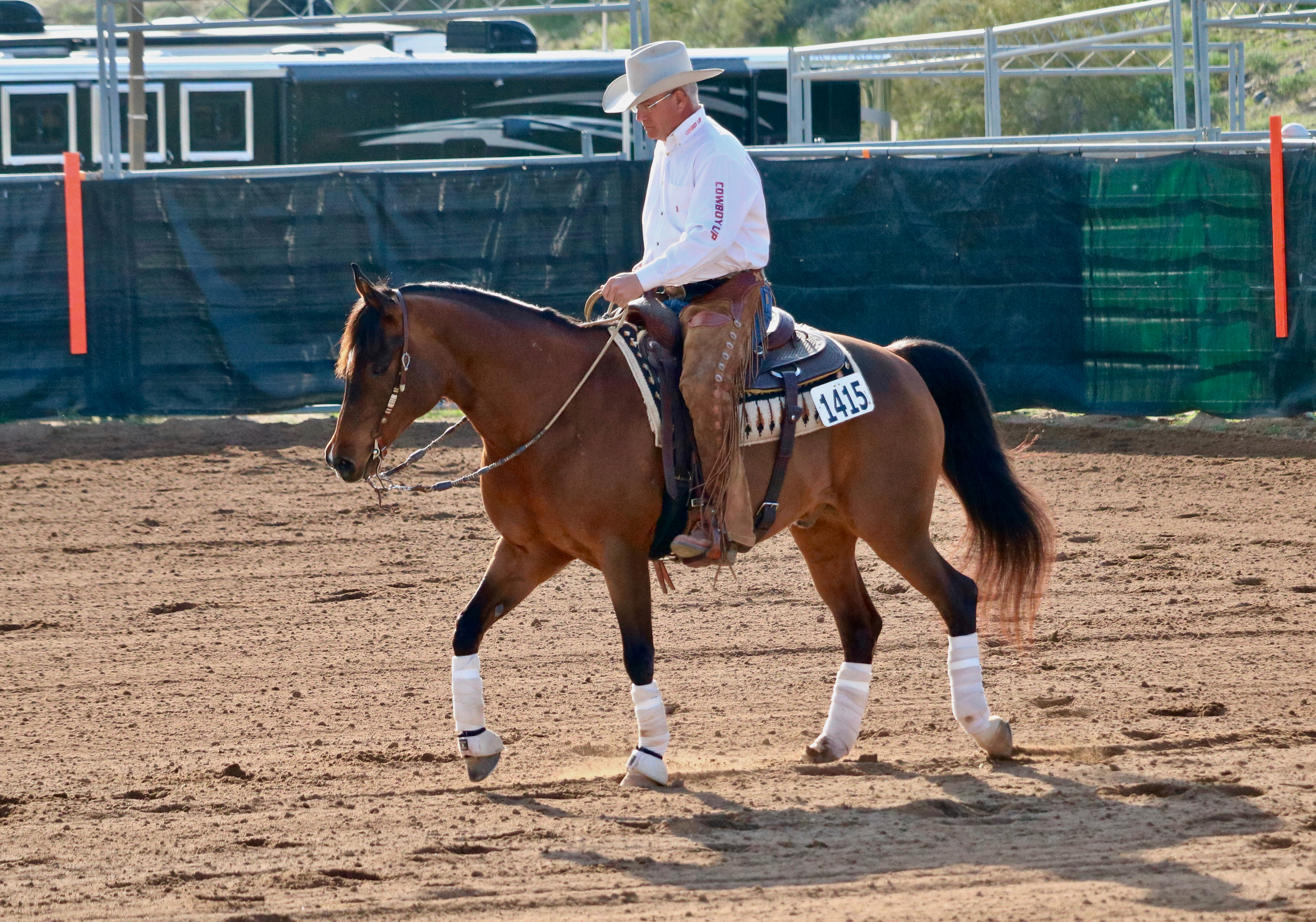
Working western division

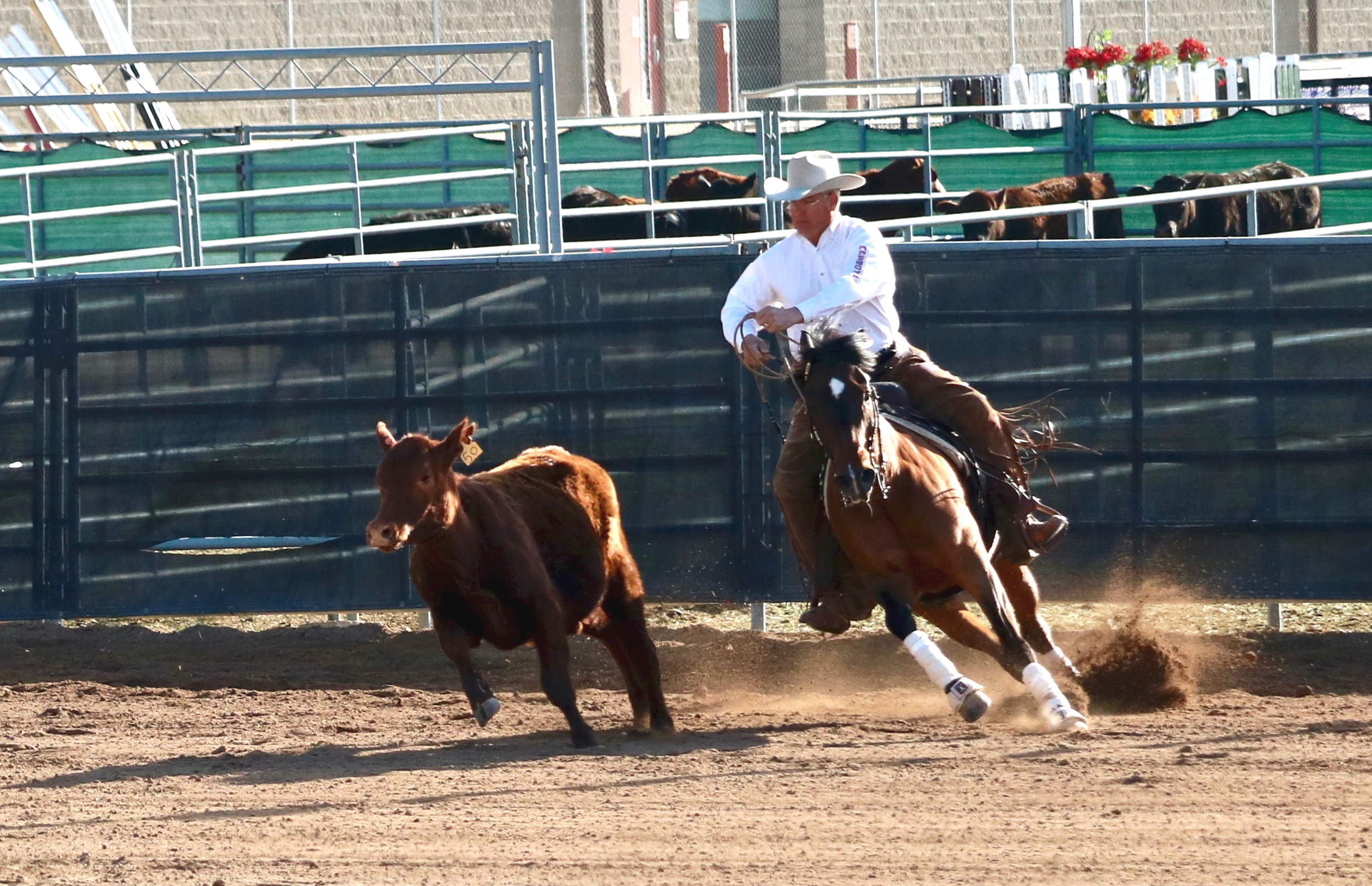
Working cow horse

== See also ==
- Magnum Psyche, 2009 titlest
