= Mannheim May Market =

Largest regional consumer exhibition of Germany

Coordinates: 49°28′09″N 8°31′32″E

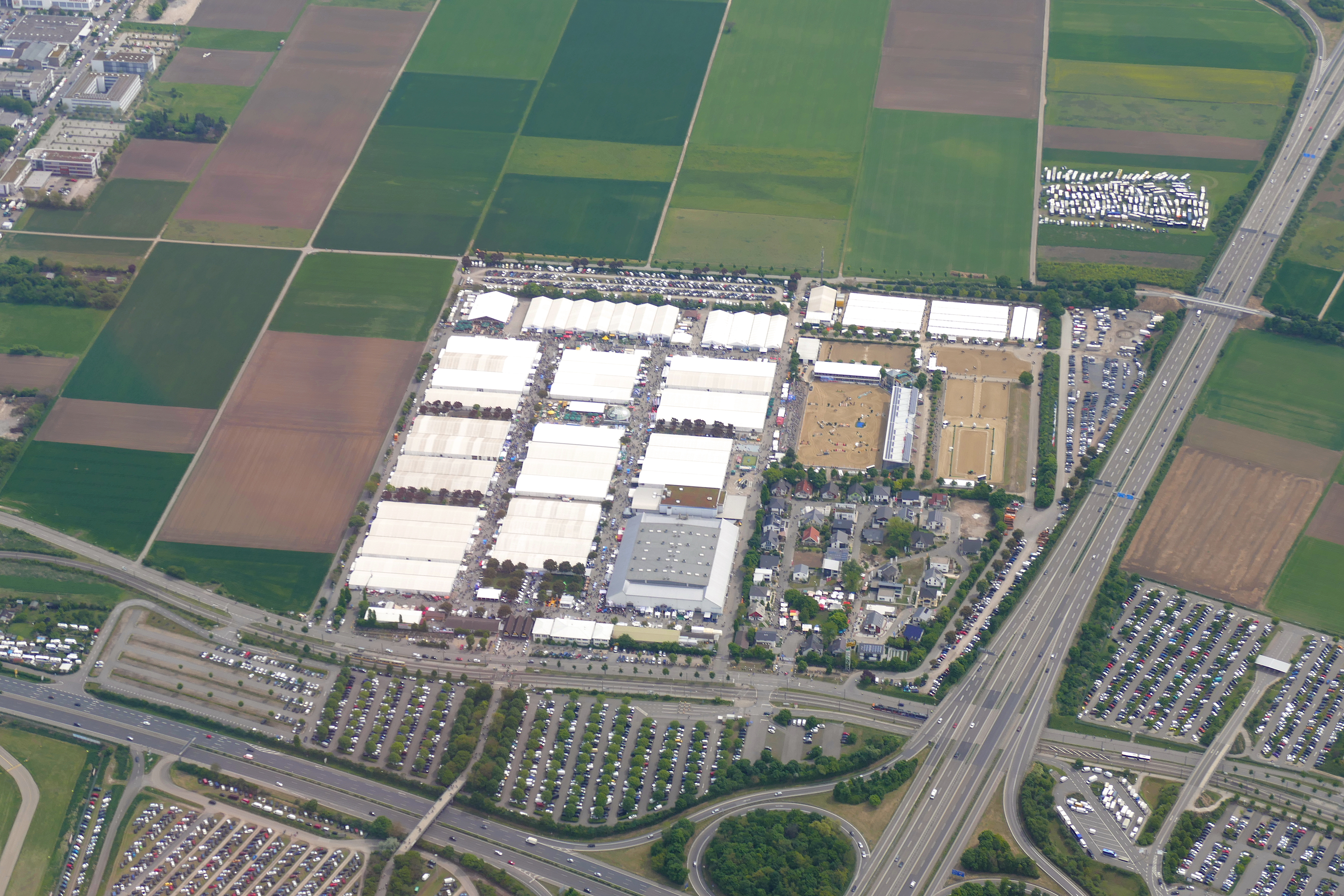
Aerial view of the Maimarkt in Mannheim (2017)

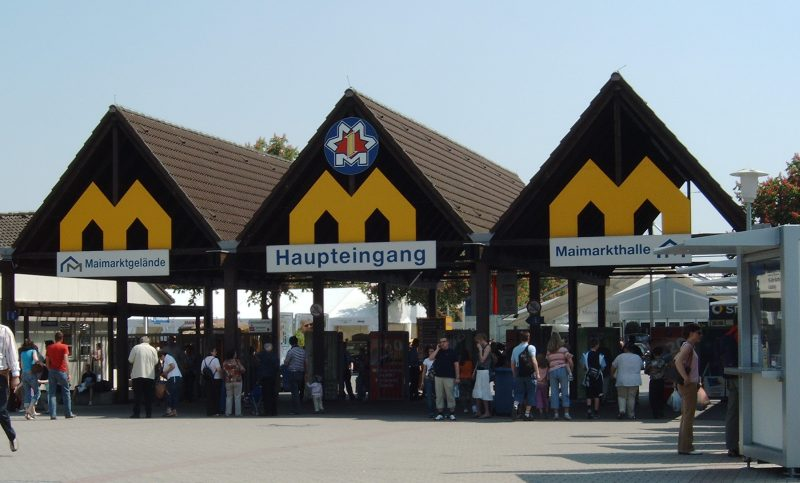
Main entrance (2006)

The May Market (German: Maimarkt) is the largest regional consumer exhibition of Germany, which always begins on last Saturday in April and lasts for eleven days. The traditionally last day is therefore called May Market Tuesday. It takes place at the Maimarktgelände in Mannheim, Baden-Württemberg.

== History ==
The May Market has a long history beginning in 1613 in Mannheim (when the city was only six years old) after John II, Count Palatine of Zweibrücken granted it privileges. The market was originally used for shopkeepers and cattle dealers.

In the 18th century, the May Market was moved under the arcades of stores in the city center. In 1876, the side shows were separated from the May Market and shifted to the old show ground. In 1892, part of the May Market moved to the newly opened slaughterhouse. In 1900 the remainder followed. In addition to the old cattle and horse market, agricultural equipment was now added, along with butcher's shops and sales of dairy produce.

The first May Market after the Second World War was held in 1949 in the Rosengarten meeting building. Later it was held in the slaughterhouse area again. In 1962, it was finally shifted by the Mannheim exhibition company to Friedensplatz opposite Luisen Park and with extensions it developed into its current form.

Since 1985, the event takes place east of the city in Mühlfeld so that its old site could be used for the new Technoseum building. In 1989, the May Market hall was built as its first permanent exhibition hall (7500 m^{2} surface area). This is used all year round and offers facilities for pop concerts for up to 12,000 visitors. Further permanent installations are the glass-walled studio of SWR as well as several administration buildings at the main entrance. In 2005, the May Market was connected to the Mannheim tram network as part of the construction of the SAP Arena.

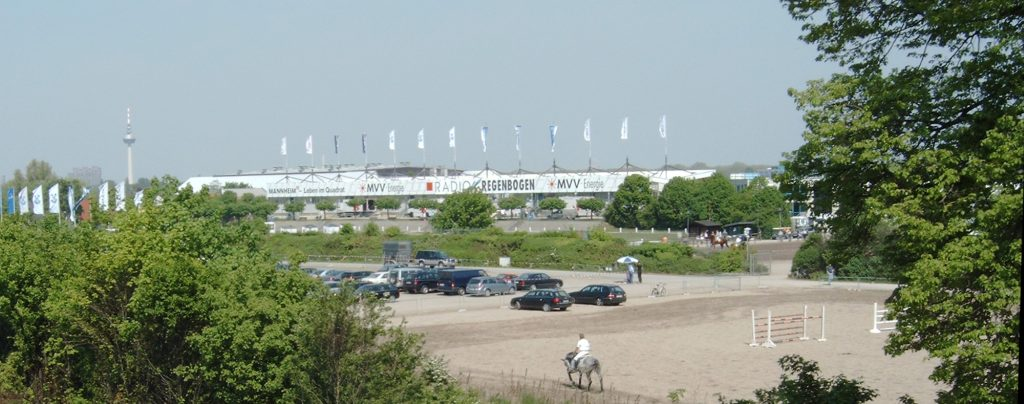
Warm-up arena and equestrian stadium (behind)

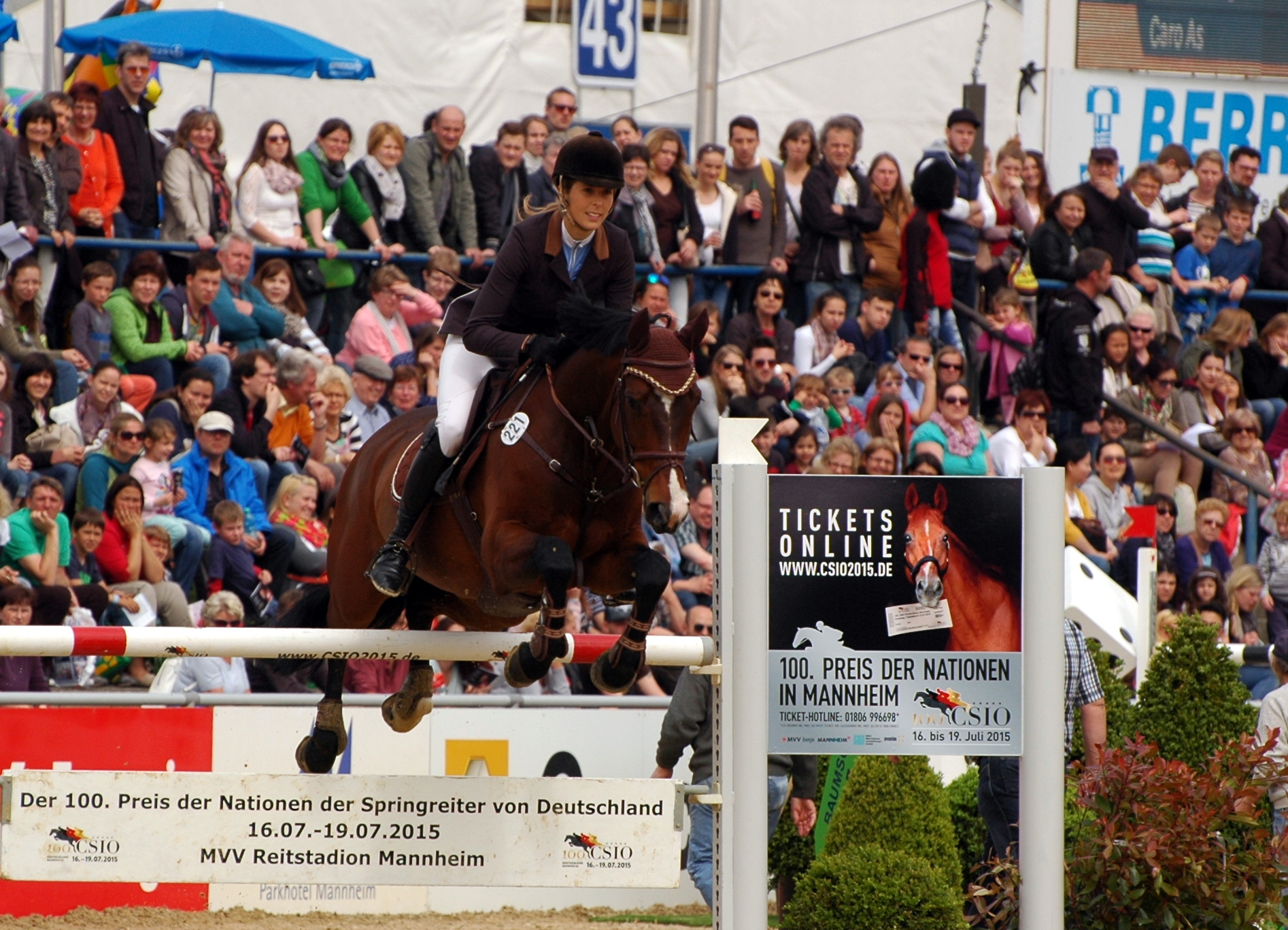
Show jumping competition (2015)

== Infrastructure ==
The May Market Grounds (Maimarktgelände) cover a surface of 210,000 m^{2}, of which about 130,000 m^{2} is serviced by infrastructure (water, electricity, telephone, partly WLAN).

The building of the SAP Arena about 500 m away in September 2005 involved the construction of the urgently needed direct tram connection as well as a further 7,000 parking spots. Previously, visitors had to take the shuttle bus to transfer to the tram terminus at Neuostheim.

== Maimarkt-Turnier ==
The Maimarkt-Turnier is an annual international horse show held during the Mannheimer Maimarkt since 1964. The main show jumping competitions are usually designed as CSI 3* and the main dressage competitions as CDI 4* (until 2017 CDI 3*).

== Notable events ==
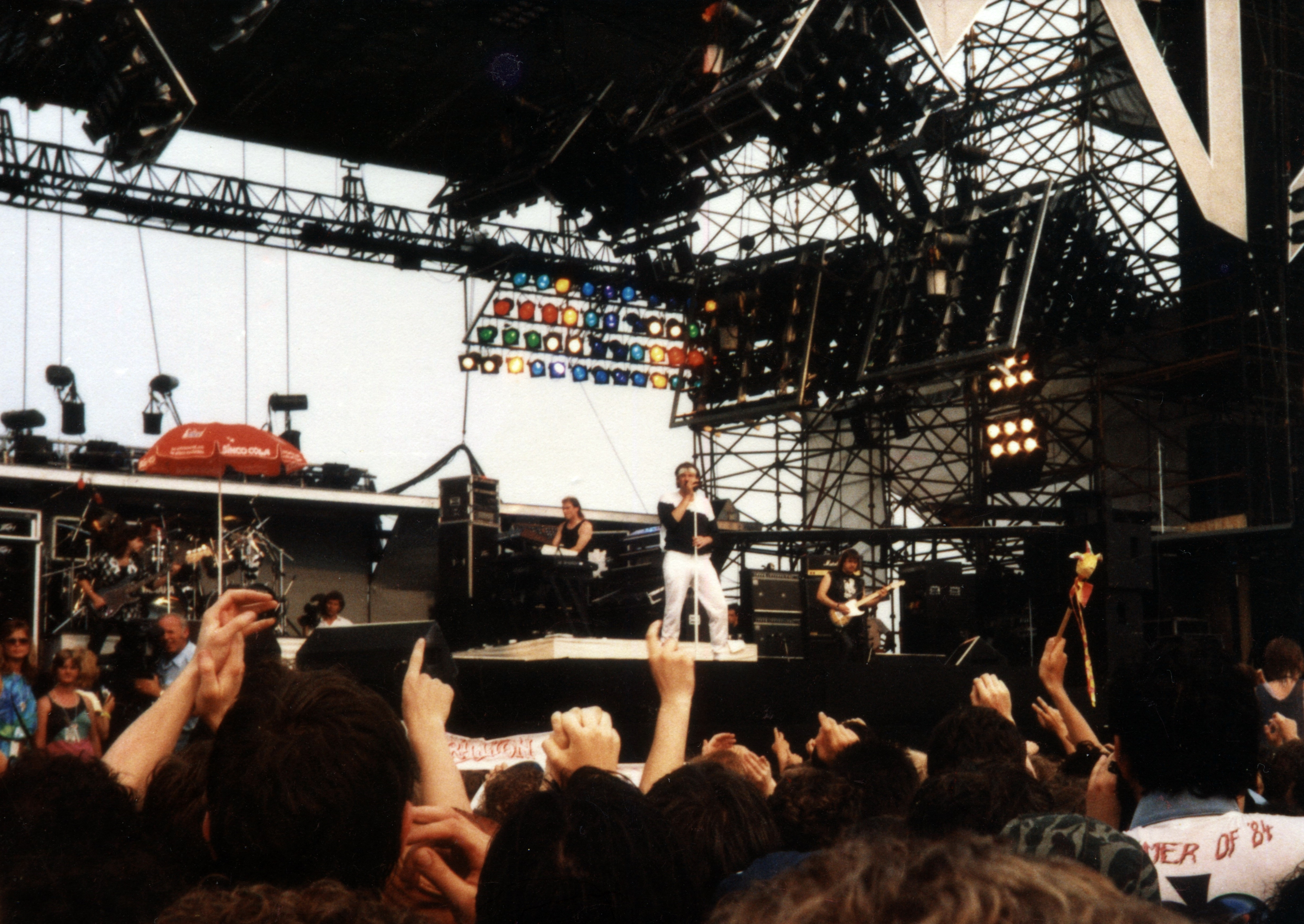
Open-air concert: Marillion with singer Fish as a supporting act for Queen at the market place (1986)

Legendary open-air concerts have taken place in the May Market area. Participants have included Deep Purple, Queen, Genesis, the Rolling Stones, Robbie Williams and Bon Jovi. It also hosted the Monsters of Rock festival on 31 August 1986 and 1 September 1990.

The most popular German TV variety show, Wetten, dass..? was transmitted live on 13 December 1997, as well as on 5 November 2005, from Mannheim May Market.
