= Monmouth County Horse Show =

Coordinates: 40.255714°N 74.248233°W

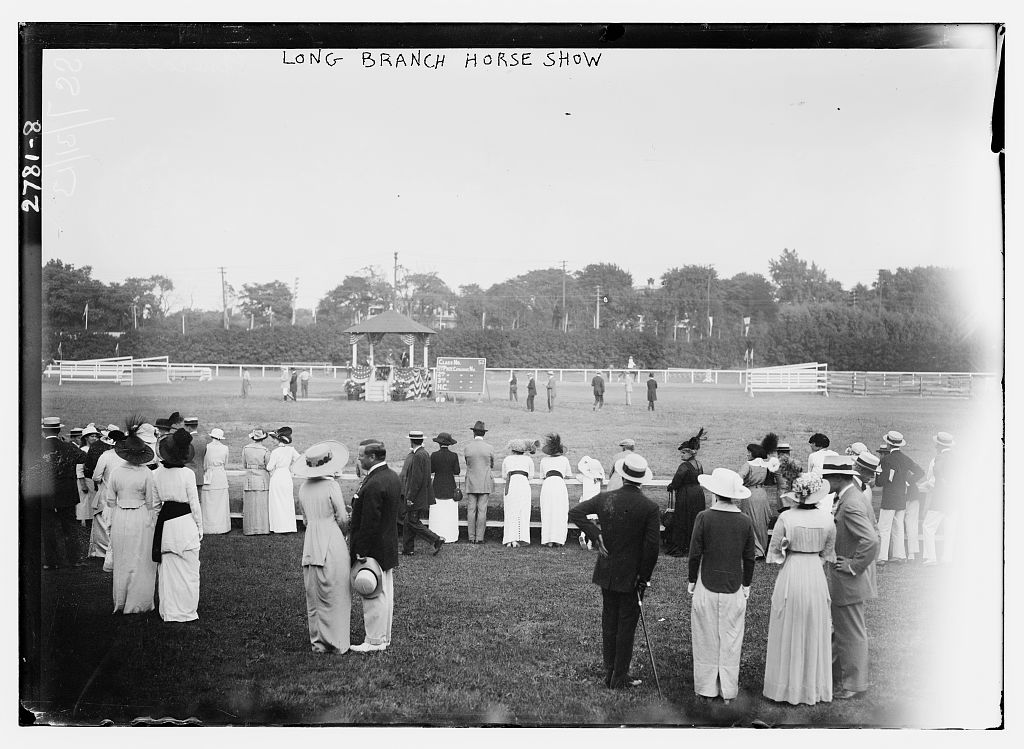
1913

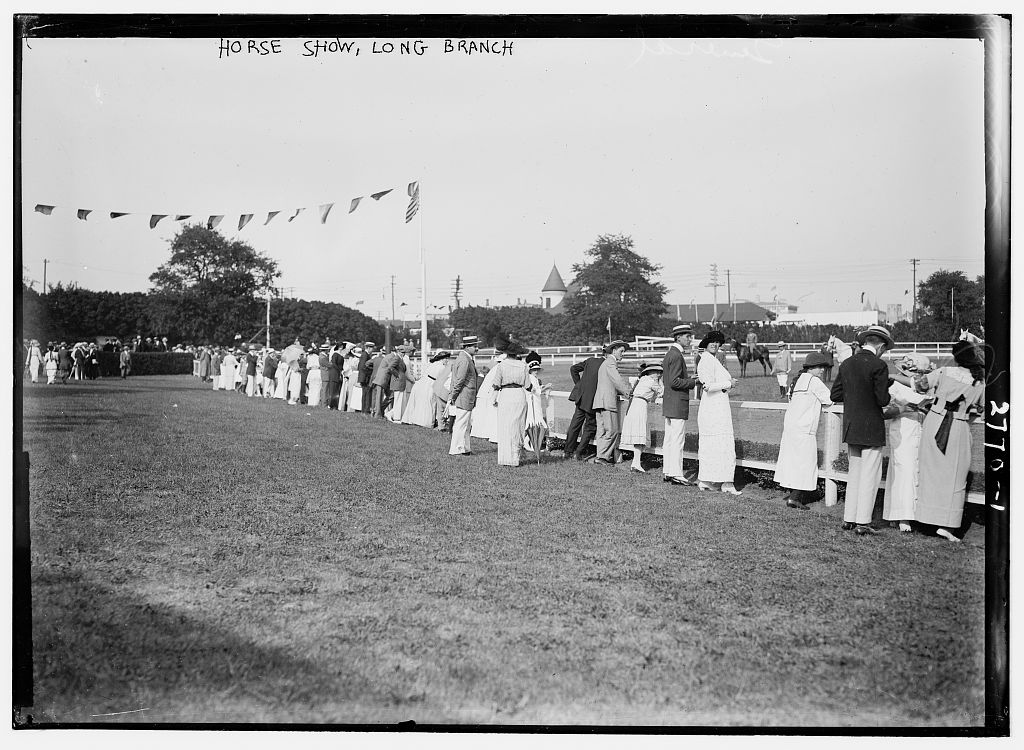
1913

The Monmouth County Horse Show has been running since 1895 and is now located in Freehold, New Jersey.

== History ==
The 1913 show was in Long Branch, New Jersey and was attended by James Fairman Fielder, the New Jersey Governor.

== See also ==
- Morristown Field Club
