= National Competition of Horsemen =

The National Competition of Horsemen (Icelandic: Landsmót hestamanna) is a sporting event for horse racing and breeding exhibition of Icelandic horses in Iceland. The event was first held 6 June 1950 at Þingvellir by the Icelandic Equestrian Association which was founded in December the year before for the purpose of running the event. In the beginning, the event was held every 4 years but since 1995 it was held every 2 years. In 2001 operational changes took place and the event is now annual and run by Landsmót hestamanna ehf, a company owned by the Icelandic Equestrian Association and the Farmers' Association of Iceland.
