= Nashville, Tennessee =

Capital of Tennessee, United States

Nashville
- State capital and consolidated city-county
- Metropolitan Government of Nashville and Davidson County
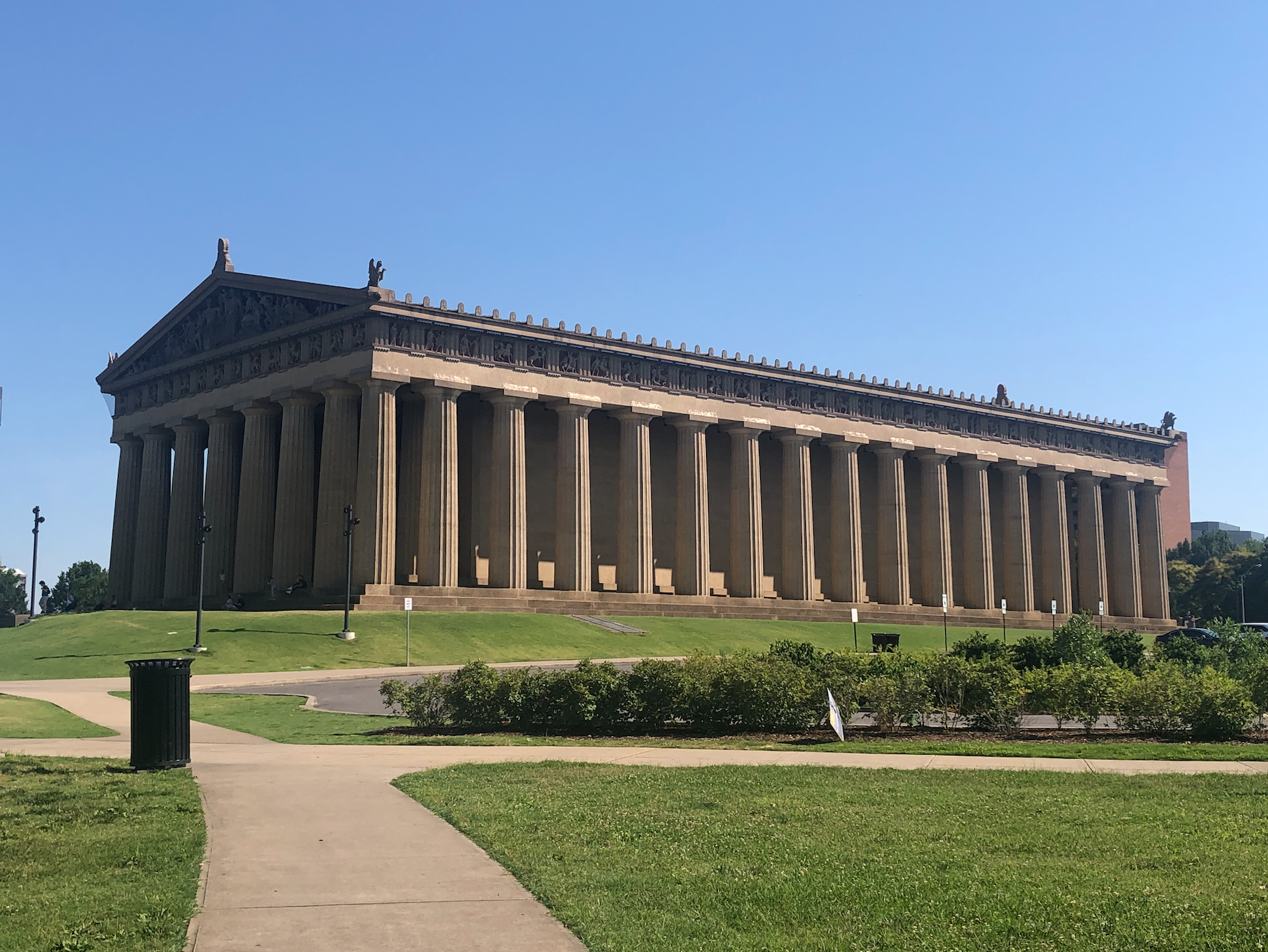
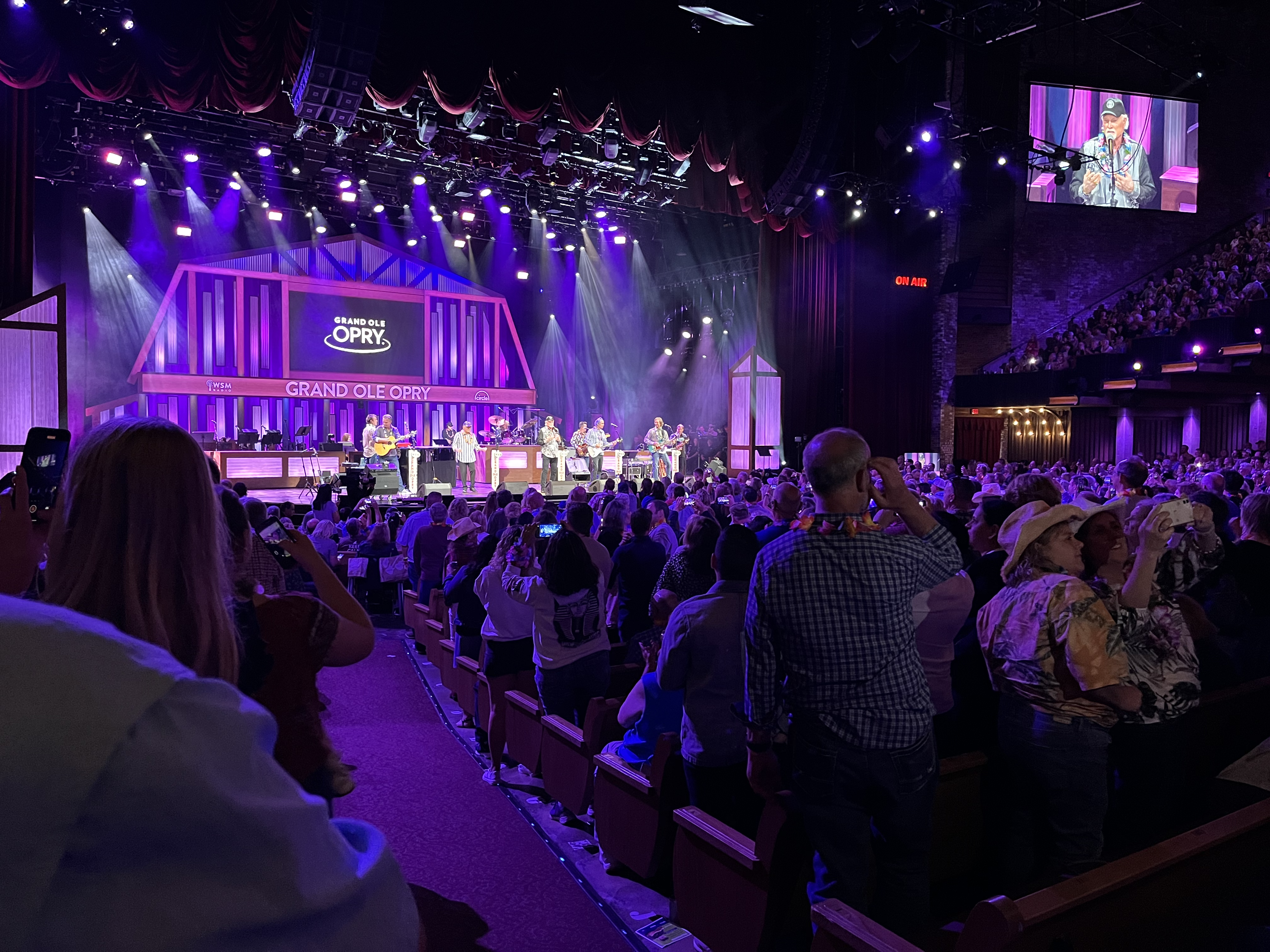
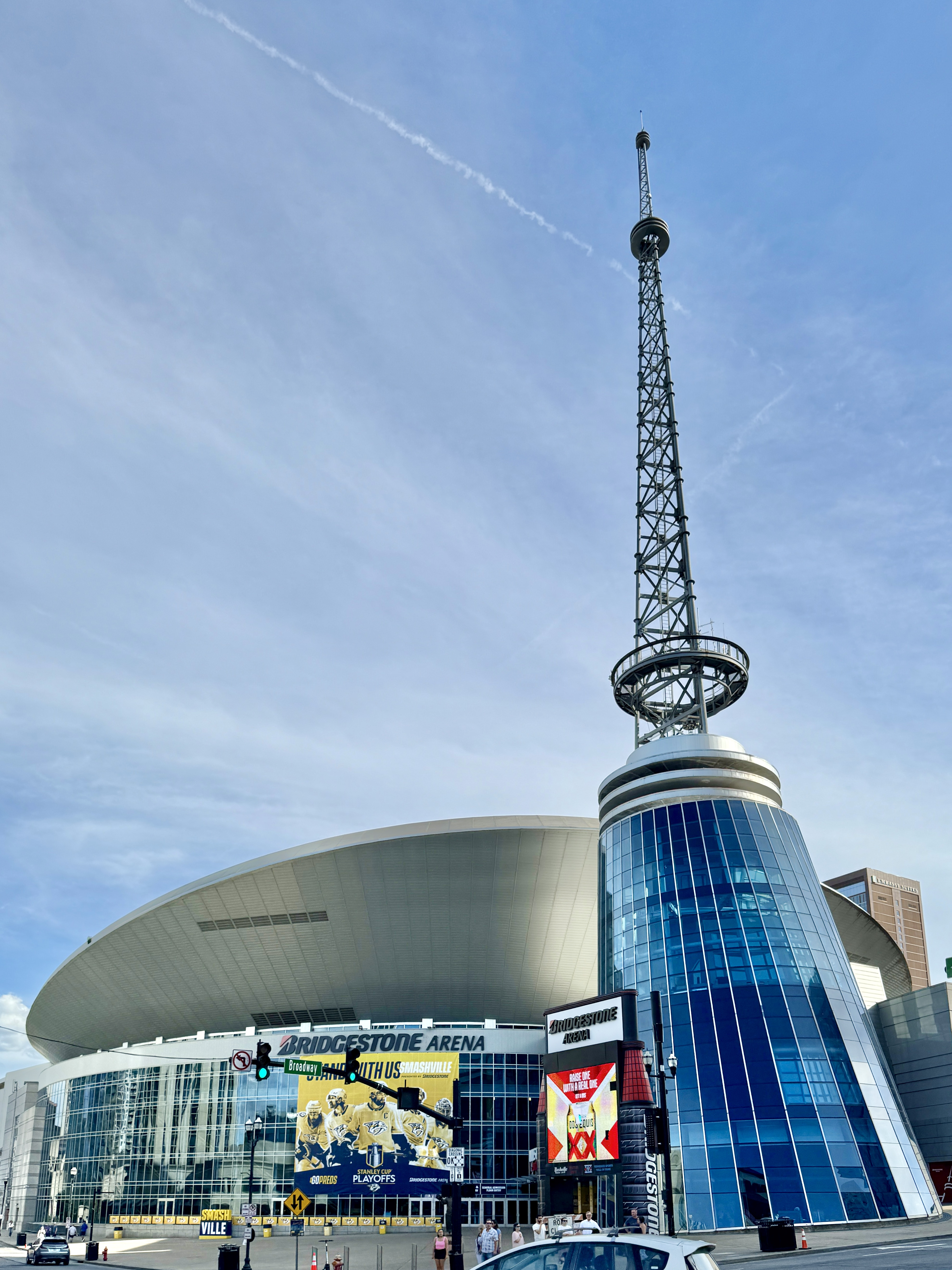
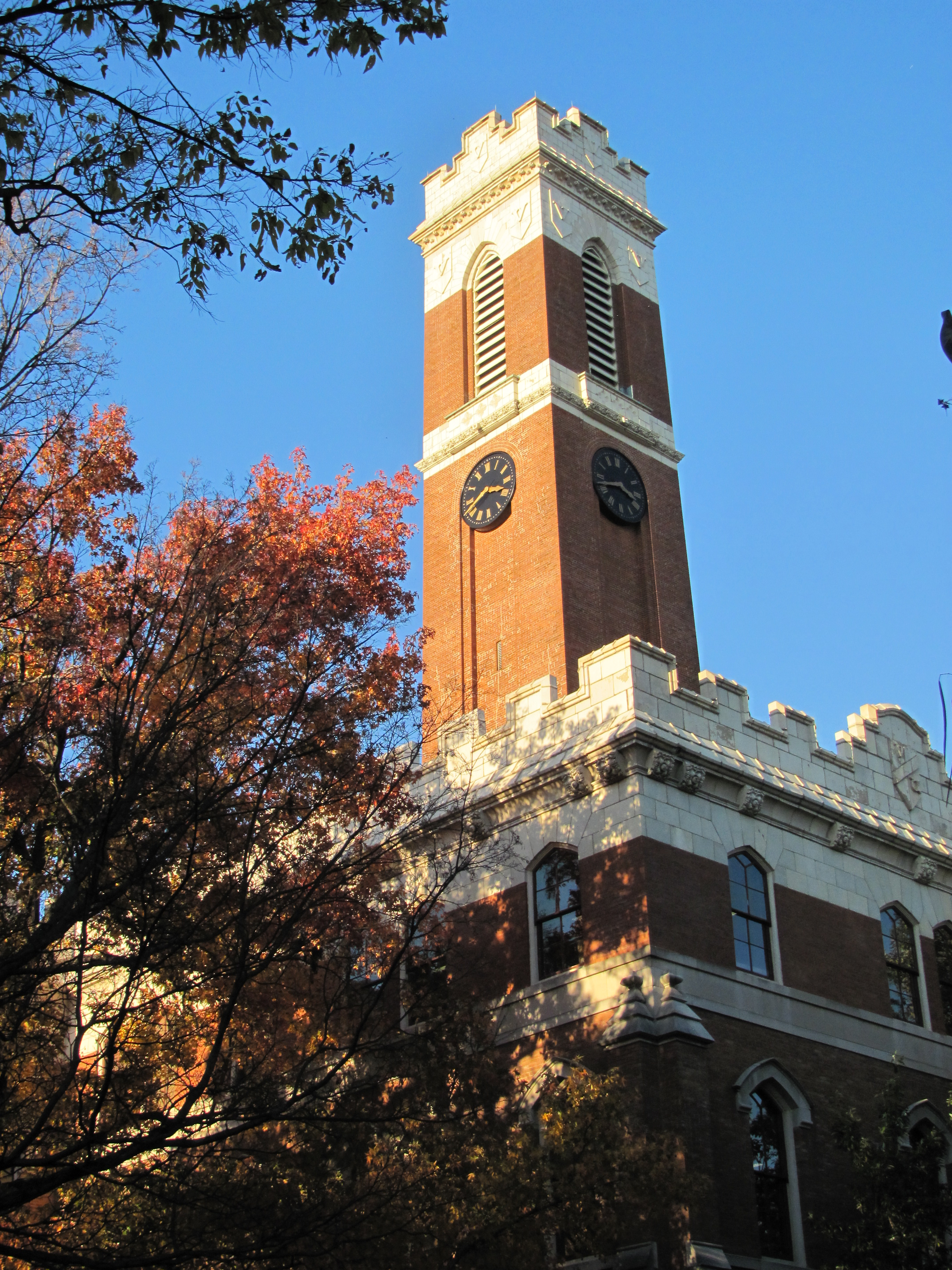
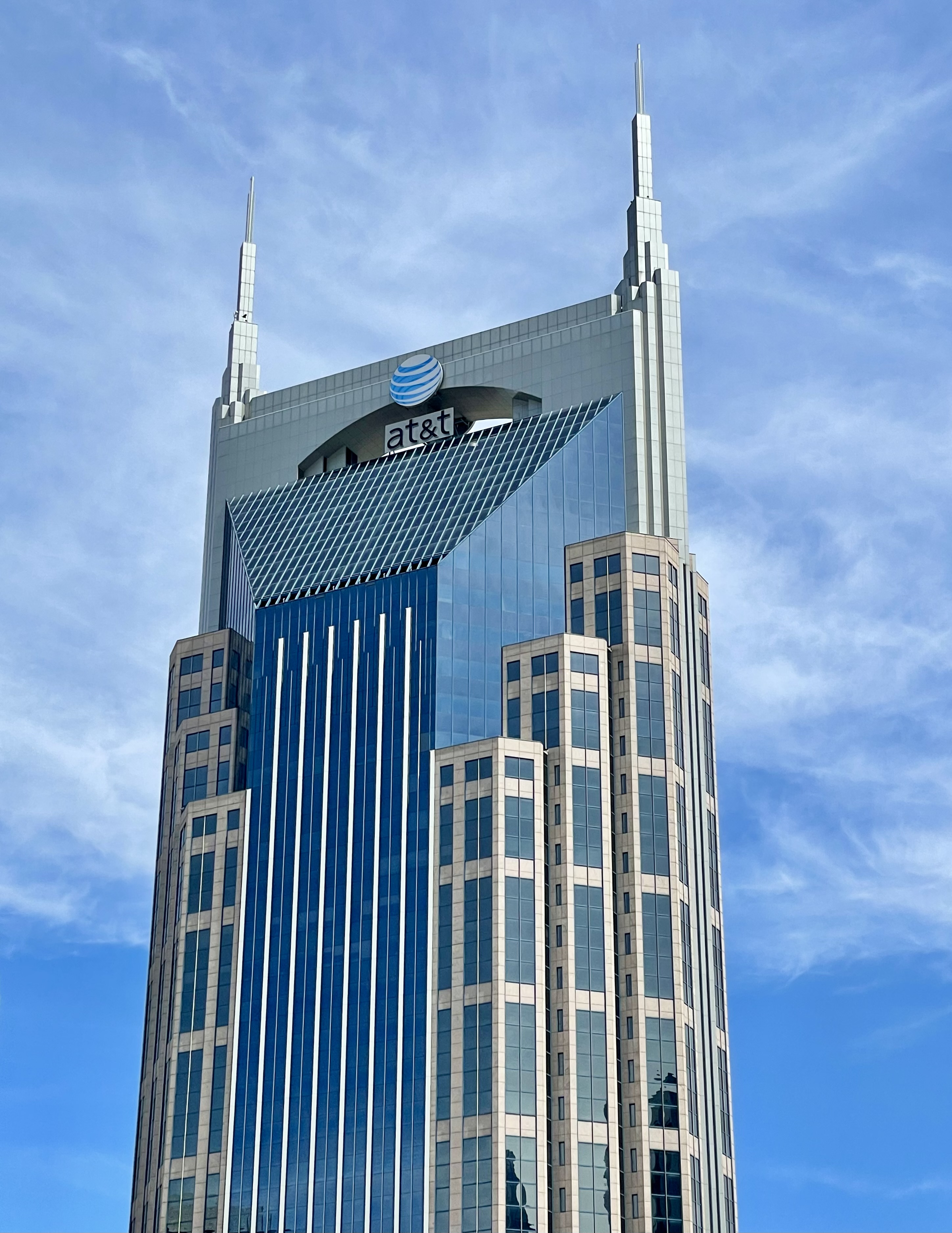
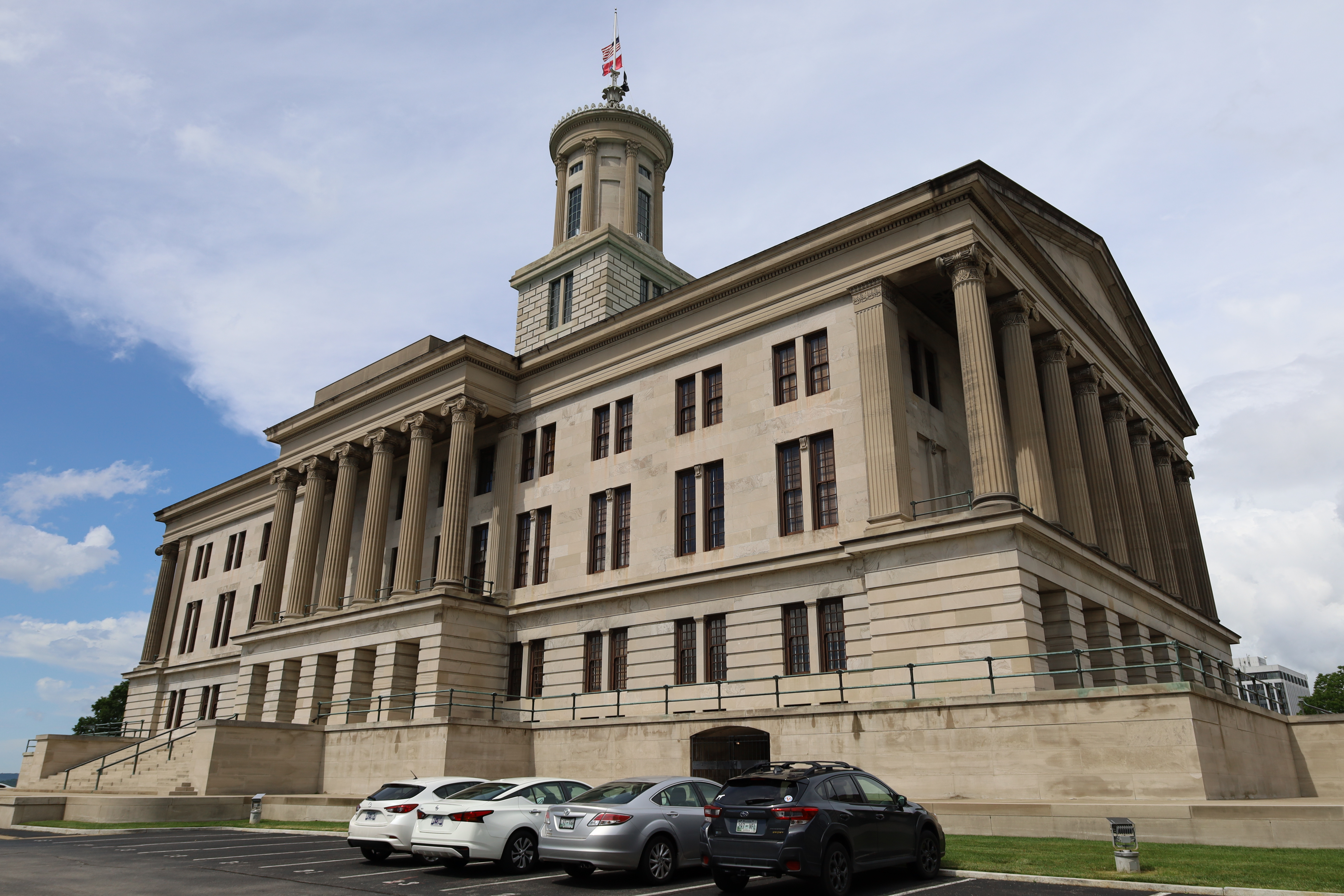
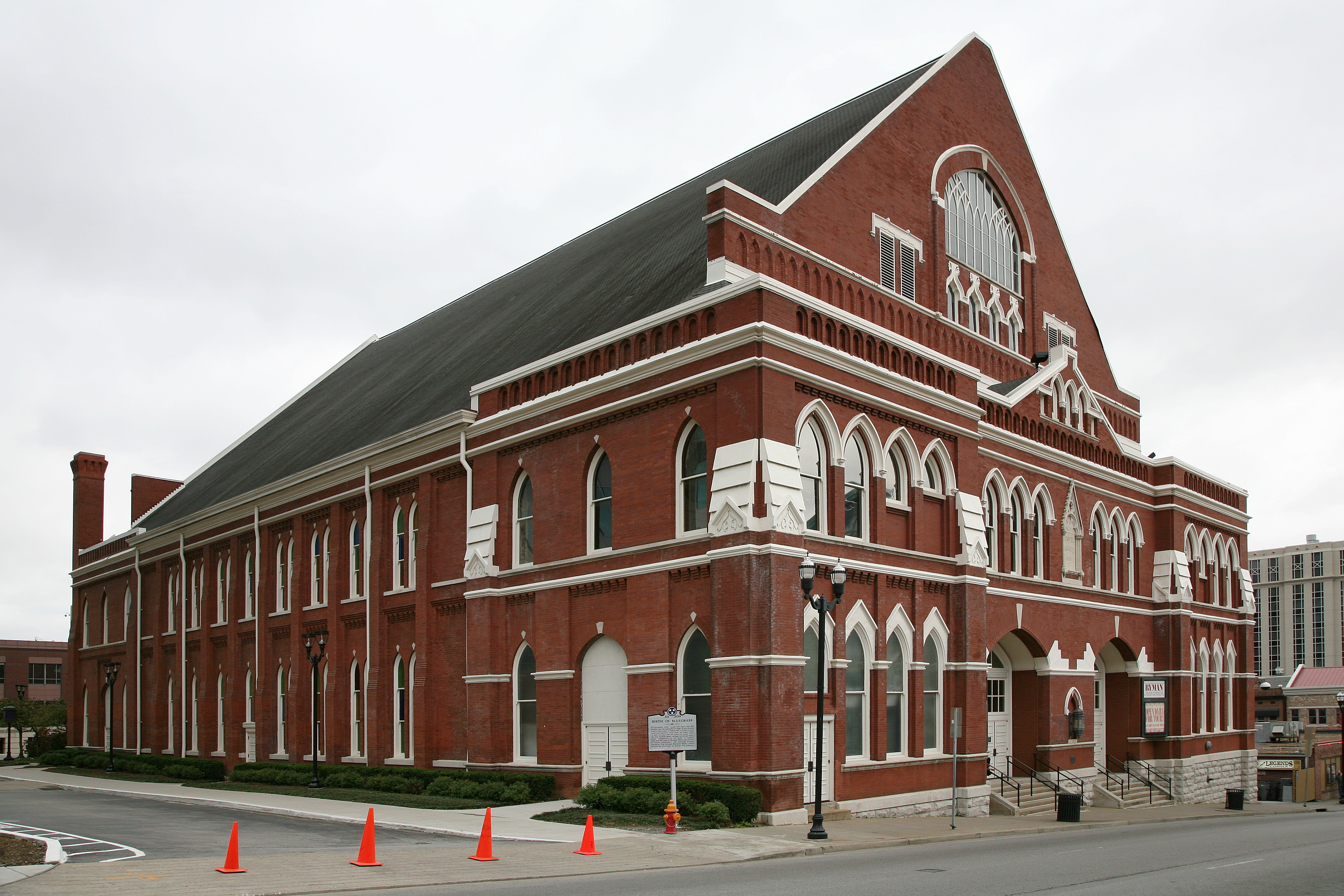
- Downtown Nashville The Parthenon Grand Ole Opry Bridgestone Arena Vanderbilt University 333 Commerce Tennessee State Capitol Ryman Auditorium

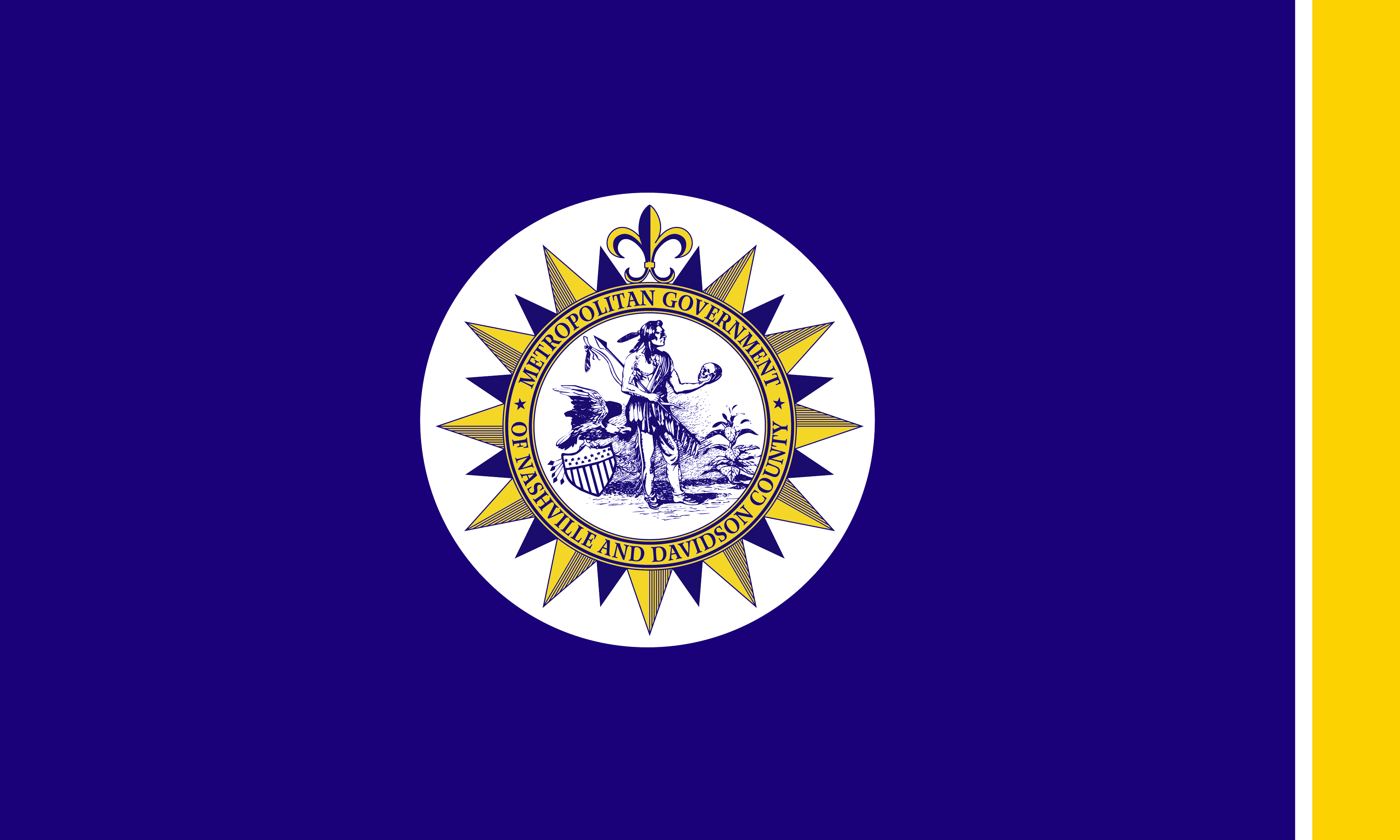
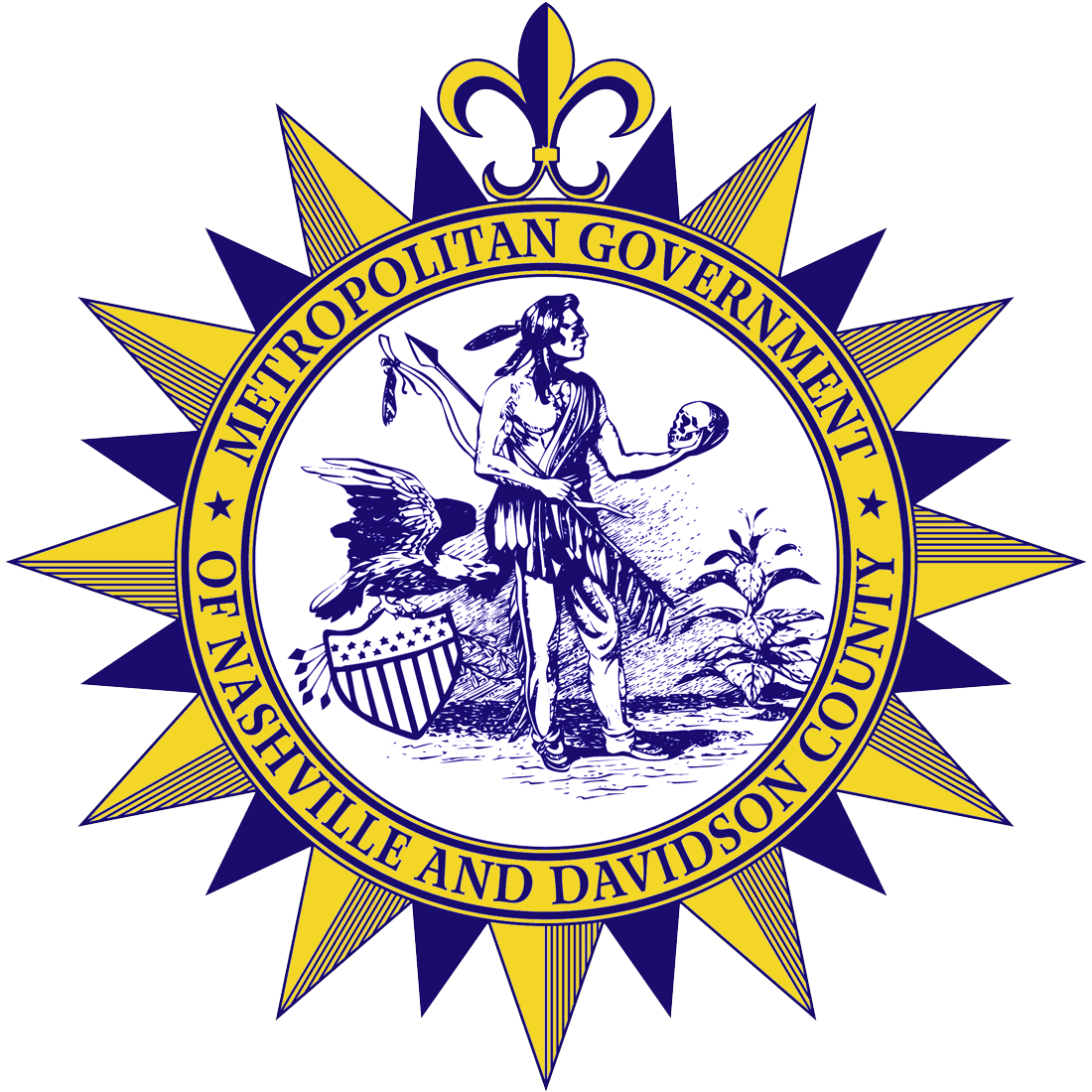
- Flag Seal
- Nicknames: Music City, Country Music Capital, Athens of the South
- Interactive map of Nashville
- Location within Tennessee Location within the United States Location within North America
- Coordinates: 36°09′44″N 86°46′28″W
- Country: United States
- State: Tennessee
- County: Davidson
- Founded: 1779; 247 years ago
- Incorporated: September 11, 1806; 220 years ago
- City-county consolidation: 1963; 63 years ago
- Named for: Francis Nash or Abner Nash

Government
  - Mayor: Freddie O'Connell (D (Note: Tennessee Code 2-13-208 requires all municipal elections and their respective offices to be nonpartisan.))
  - Vice Mayor: Angie Henderson

Area
  - Total: 525.94 sq mi (1,362.2 km^{2})
  - Land: 504.03 sq mi (1,305.4 km^{2})
  - Water: 21.91 sq mi (56.7 km^{2})
- Elevation: 554 ft (169 m)

Population (2020)
  - Total: 689,447
  - Estimate (2025): 721,074 ▲
  - Rank: 65th in North America; 20th in the United States (Note: This ranking is based on Nashville's balance population of 689,447.); 1st in Tennessee
  - Density: 1,420.3/sq mi (548.39/km^{2})
  - Urban: 1,158,642 (US: 42nd)
  - Urban density: 1,981/sq mi (764.8/km^{2})
  - Metro: 2,150,553 (US: 35th)
- Demonym: Nashvillian

GDP
  - Total: $116.879 billion (2024)
  - Metro: $204.861 billion (2023)
- Time zone: UTC−6 (CST)
  - Summer (DST): UTC−5 (CDT)
- ZIP Codes: 37201–37222, 37224, 37227–37230, 37232, 37234–37236, 37238, 37240–37244, 37246, 37250, 37206
- Area codes: 615 and 629
- FIPS Code: 47-52006
- GNIS feature ID: 1652484
- Website: nashville.gov

Nashville (/ˈnæʃvɪl/ NASH-vil) is the capital and most populous city in the U.S. state of Tennessee. It is the seat of Davidson County in Middle Tennessee, located on the Cumberland River. It is the 20th-most populous city in the United States and fourth-most populous city in the Southeast, with a population of 689,447 at the 2020 census (estimated at 721,074 in 2025). (Note: De jure, the city of Nashville includes all of Davidson County including its satellite cities. However, the Nashville-Davidson balance will be used when referring to Nashville.) The Nashville metropolitan area, with over 2.15 million people, is the 35th-largest metropolitan area in the country. Nashville is among the fastest-growing cities in the U.S.

Named in honor of Francis Nash, a general of the Continental Army during the American Revolutionary War, the city was founded in 1779 when this territory was still part of North Carolina. The city quickly grew due to its strategic location as a port on the Cumberland River and, in the 19th century, a railroad center. Nashville as part of Tennessee seceded during the American Civil War; in 1862 it was the first state capital in the Confederacy to be taken by Union forces. It was occupied through the end of the war. After the war, the city gradually reclaimed its stature. It became a center of trade and developed a manufacturing base.

Since 1963, Nashville has had a consolidated city-county government, which is composed of six smaller municipalities in a two-tier system. The city is governed by a mayor, a vice mayor, and a 40-member metropolitan council. Thirty-five of the members are elected from single-member districts, while five are elected at-large. Reflecting the city's position in state government, Nashville is home to the Tennessee Supreme Court's courthouse for Middle Tennessee, one of the state's three divisions.

As of 2020, Nashville is considered a global city, type "Gamma" by the GaWC. It is a major center for the music industry, especially country music, and is commonly referred to as Music City. It is home to three major professional sports teams: the Predators, Titans, and Nashville SC. The city is also the home of many colleges and universities including Tennessee State University, Vanderbilt University, Belmont University, Fisk University, Trevecca Nazarene University, and Lipscomb University. Nashville is sometimes referred to as the "Athens of the South" due to the large number of educational institutions. The city is also a major center for the healthcare, publishing, banking, automotive, and technology industries. Entities with headquarters in the city include AllianceBernstein, Asurion, Bridgestone Americas, Captain D's, Concord, Gideons International, Hospital Corporation of America, LifeWay Christian Resources, Logan's Roadhouse, and Ryman Hospitality Properties.

== History ==
=== 18th and 19th centuries ===
In 1689, French-Canadian trader Martin Chartier established a trading post on the Cumberland River, near the present-day site of the city. In 1714, a group of French traders under the command of Charles Charleville established a settlement and trading post at the present location of downtown Nashville, which became known as French Lick. These settlers quickly established an extensive fur trading network with the local Native Americans, but by the 1740s the settlement had largely been abandoned.

In 1779, a settling party organized by Judge Richard Henderson, led by explorers James Robertson and John Donelson of Overmountain Men, traveled to the site of French Lick, and constructed Fort Nashborough. It was chartered by the North Carolina General Assembly on April 19, 1784, meeting in Hillsborough, North Carolina and named in honor of Francis Nash, the American Revolutionary War hero. Nash's home, the Nash-Hooper House, was adjacent to the location of the proceedings of the 1784 session of the General Assembly. Nashville quickly grew because of its strategic location as a port on the Cumberland River, a tributary of the Ohio River; and its later status as a major railroad center. By 1800, the city had 345 residents, including 136 enslaved African Americans and 14 free African Americans. In 1806, Nashville was incorporated as a city and became the county seat of Davidson County, Tennessee. In 1843, the city was named as the permanent capital of the state of Tennessee. Knoxville, Kingston, and Murfreesboro were prior locations of the state capital.

The city government of Nashville owned 24 slaves by 1831, and 60 prior to the Civil War. They were "put to work to build the first successful water system and maintain the streets." Auction blocks and brokers' offices were part of the slave market at the heart of the city. It was the center of plantations cultivating tobacco and hemp as commodity crops, in addition to the breeding and training of thoroughbred horses, and other livestock. For years, Nashville was considered one of the wealthiest southern capitals and a large portion of its prominence was from the iron business. Nashville led the south for iron production.

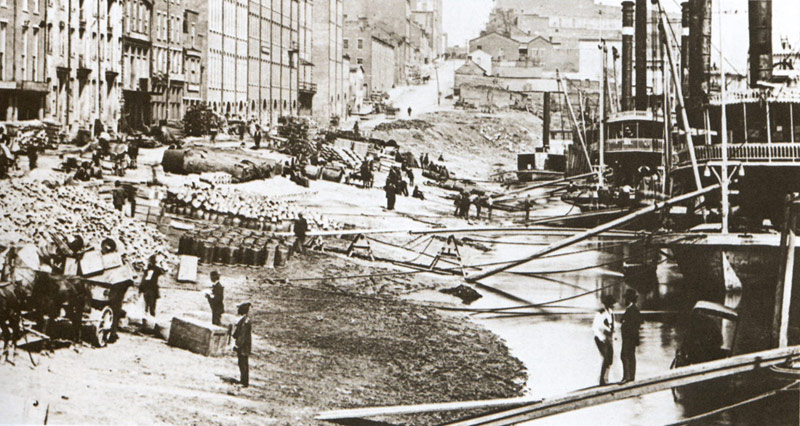
Nashville riverfront shortly after the American Civil War

The cholera epidemic that struck Nashville in 1849–1850 took the life of former U.S. President James K. Polk and resulted in high fatalities. There were 311 deaths from cholera in 1849 and an estimated 316 to about 500 in 1850.

Before the Civil War, about 700 free Blacks lived in small enclaves in northern Nashville. More than 3,200 enslaved African Americans lived in the city. By 1860, when the first rumblings of secession began to be heard across the South, antebellum Nashville was a prosperous city.

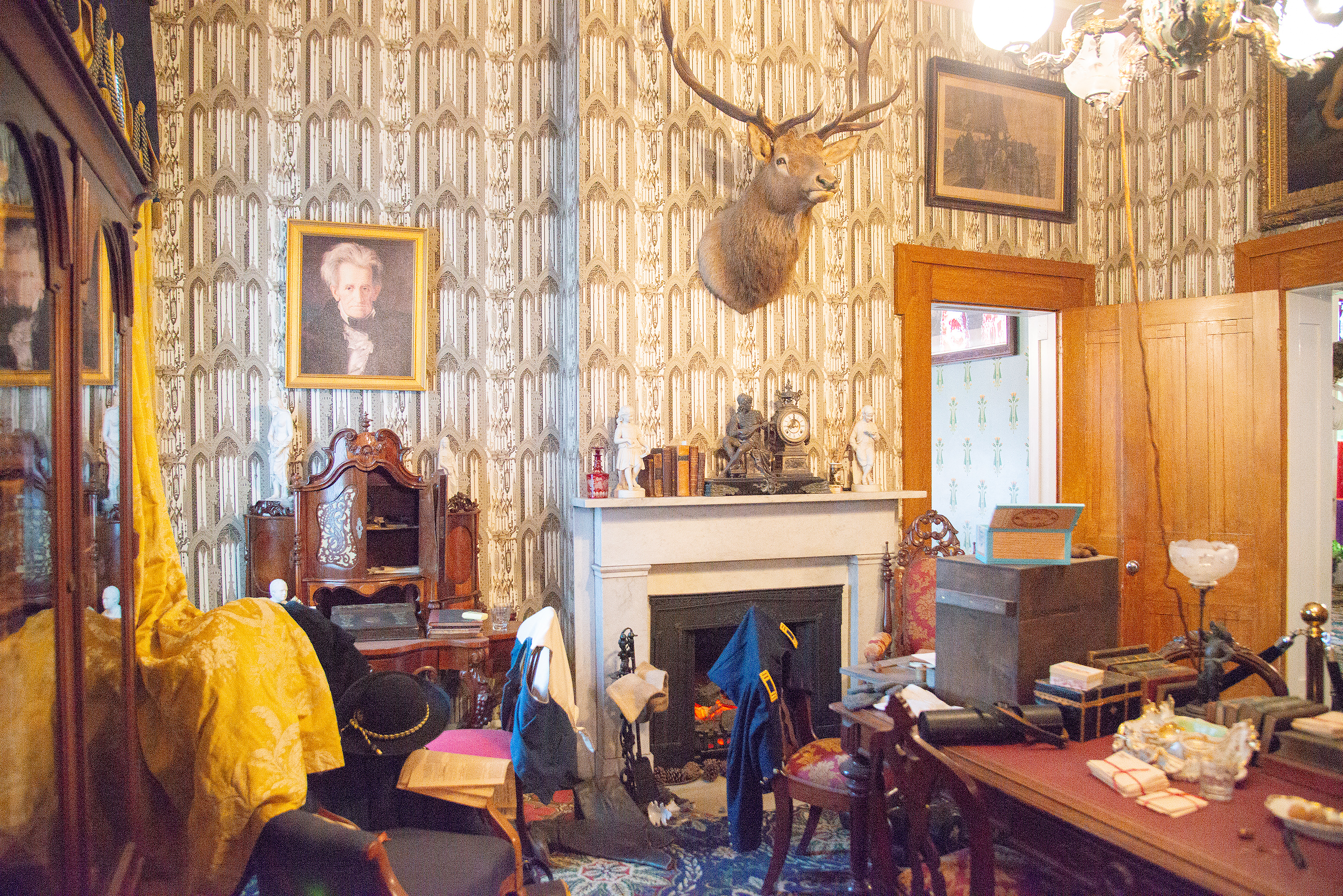
Belmont Mansion was occupied by Union troops in December 1864; the library with Union uniforms on some chairs

The city's significance as a shipping port and rail center made it a desirable prize for competing military forces that wanted to control the region's important river and railroad transportation routes. In February 1862, the Confederacy lost the Battle of Fort Donelson, and Nashville became the first Confederate state capital to fall to U.S. troops. The state was occupied by the U.S. Army for the duration of the war. Many enslaved African Americans from Middle Tennessee fled as refugees to Union lines; they were housed in contraband camps around military installations in Nashville's eastern, western, and southern borders. The Confederacy attempted to retake Nashville during the Battle of Nashville (December 15–16, 1864), but failed, in what was a significant Union victory and perhaps the most decisive tactical victory gained by either side in the war. It was also the war's final major military action in which Tennessee regiments played a large part on both sides of the battle. Afterward, the Confederates conducted a war of attrition, making guerrilla raids and engaging in small skirmishes. Confederate forces in the Deep South were almost constantly in retreat.

In 1868, three years after the end of the Civil War, the Nashville chapter of the Ku Klux Klan was founded by Confederate veteran John W. Morton. He was reported to have initiated General Nathan Bedford Forrest into the white-supremacist organization. The latter became Grand Wizard of the organization, which had chapters of this secret, insurgent group forming throughout the state and across the South. They opposed voting and political organizing by freedmen, tried to control their behavior by threats, violence and murder, and sometimes also attacked their White allies, including schoolteachers from the North and Freedman's Bureau officials.

Whites directed violence against freedmen and their descendants both during and after the Reconstruction era. Two freedmen, David Jones and Jo Reed, were lynched in Nashville by White mobs in 1872 and 1875, respectively. Reed was hanged from a bridge over the river, but survived after the rope broke and he fell into the water. He successfully escaped the city soon thereafter.

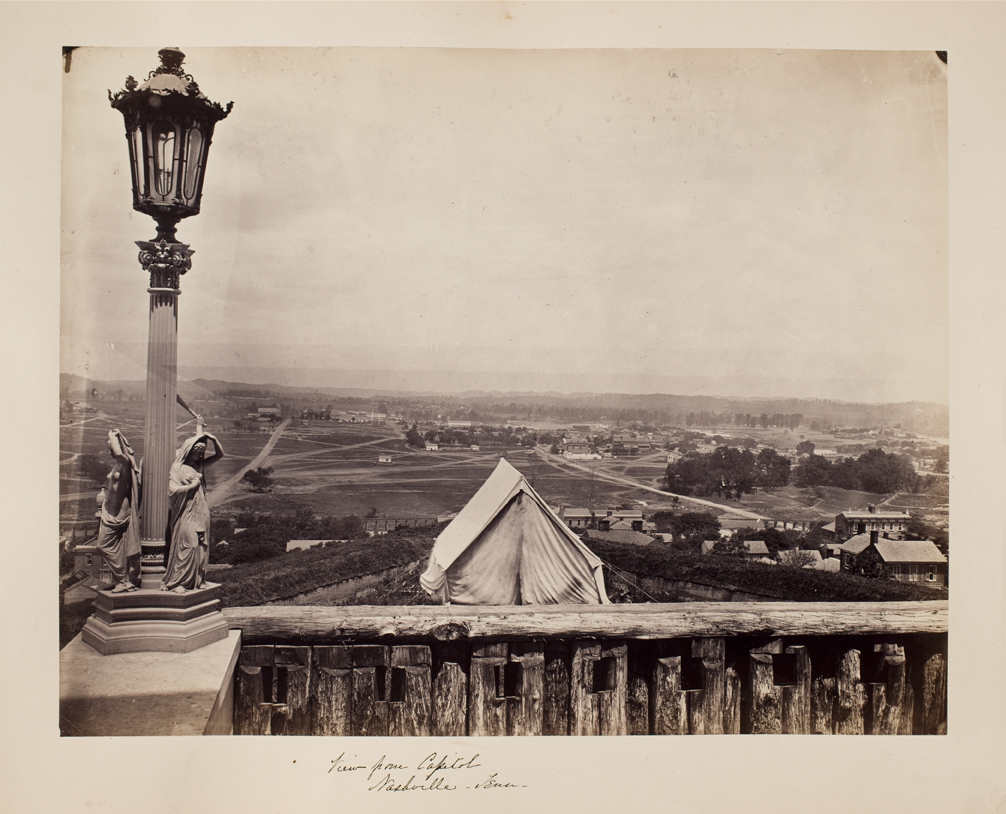
View from the Tennessee State Capitol c. 1865

In the aftermath of the Civil War, the Fisk Jubilee Singers of Fisk University in Nashville emerged as a beacon of hope and cultural pride. By 1871, this ensemble began touring the U.S. and Europe, earning international acclaim for their performances of Negro spirituals. Their success not only provided vital funding for their university but also marked Nashville as a significant center for African American music and culture, laying the groundwork for the city's enduring musical legacy.

In 1873, Nashville suffered another cholera epidemic, along with towns throughout Sumner County along railroad routes and the Cumberland River. This was part of a larger epidemic that struck the Mississippi Valley system and other areas of the United States, such as New York and towns along its major lakes and rivers. The epidemic is estimated to have killed around 1,000 people in Nashville, and 50,000 total.

Meanwhile, the city had reclaimed its important shipping and trading position and developed a solid manufacturing base. The post–Civil War years of the late 19th century brought new prosperity to Nashville and Davidson County. Wealthy planters and businessmen built grand, classical-style buildings. A replica of the Parthenon was constructed in Centennial Park, near downtown.

On April 30, 1892, Ephraim Grizzard, an African-American man, was lynched in a spectacle murder in front of a white mob of 10,000 in Nashville. He was a suspect in the assault of two white sisters. His lynching was described by journalist Ida B. Wells as: "A naked, bloody example of the blood-thirstiness of the nineteenth century civilization of the Athens of the South." His brother, Henry Grizzard, had been lynched and hanged on April 24, 1892, in nearby Goodlettsville as a suspect in the same assault incident. From 1877 to 1950, a total of six lynchings of Blacks were conducted in Davidson County, four before the turn of the century.

=== Earlier 20th century ===
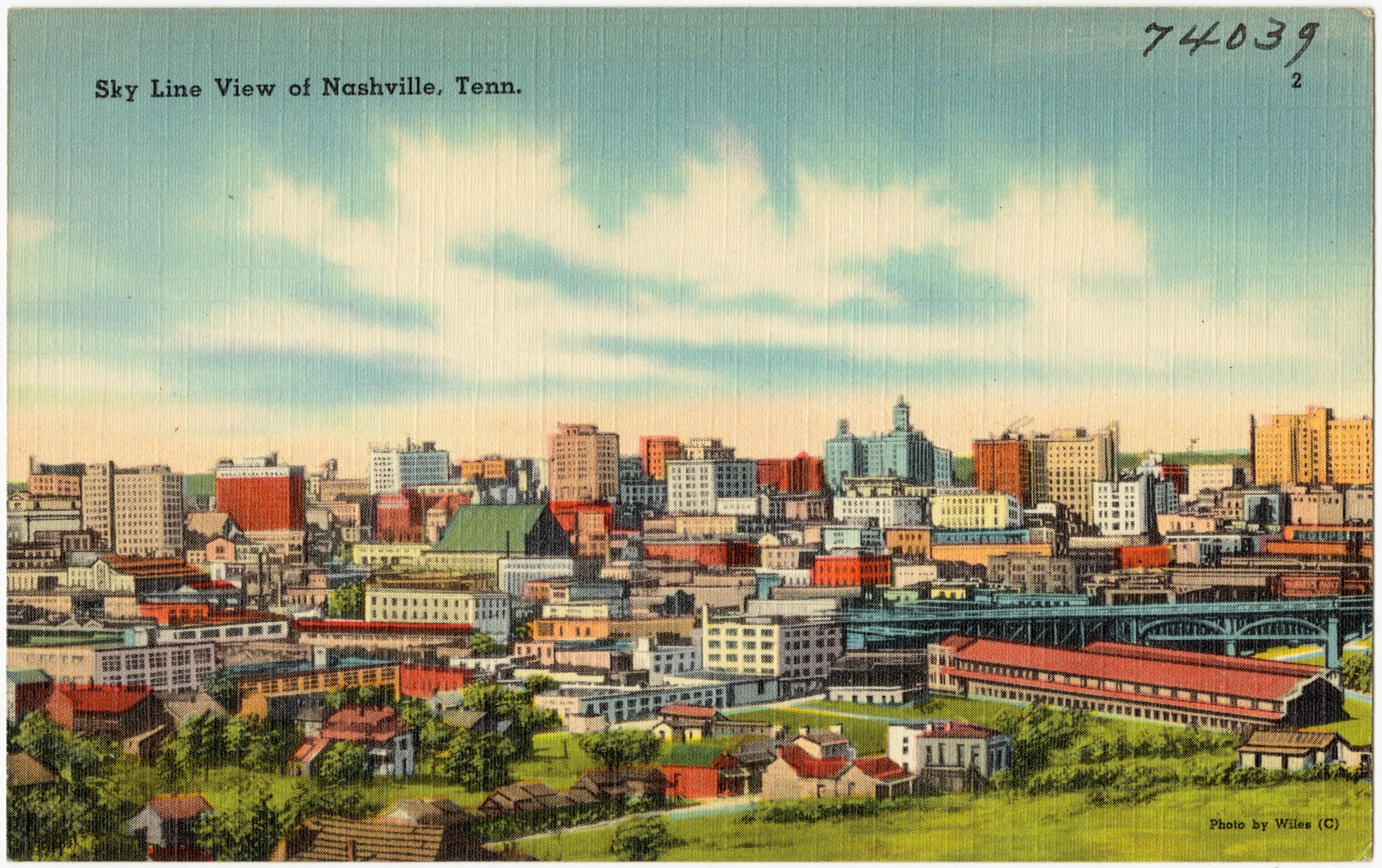
Depiction of Nashville skyline c. 1940s

By the turn of the century, Nashville was home to numerous organizations and individuals associated with revisionist Lost Cause of the Confederacy pseudohistory, and it has been referred to as the "cradle of the Lost Cause". In 1893, the magazine Confederate Veteran began publication in the city. In 1894, the first chapter of United Daughters of the Confederacy was founded in the city, and it hosted the first two conventions of the organization. Prominent proponents of the mythology, the so-called "guardians of the Lost Cause", were concentrated Downtown and in the West End, near Centennial Park.

At the same time, Jefferson Street became the historic center of the African American community, with similar districts developing in the Black neighborhoods in East and North Nashville. In 1912, the Tennessee Agricultural and Industrial and Normal School was moved to Jefferson Street. The first Prince's Hot Chicken Shack originated at the corner of Jefferson Street and 28th Avenue in 1945. Jefferson Street became a destination for jazz and blues musicians, and remained so until the federal government split the area by construction of Interstate 40 in the late 1960s.

In 1925, the establishment of the Grand Ole Opry marked the beginning of Nashville's journey as the "country music capital of the world", drawing musicians and fans and setting the stage for its future as a country music powerhouse.

=== Mid-20th century ===
In 1950, the state legislature approved a new city charter that provided for the election of city council members from single-member districts, rather than at-large voting. This change was supported because at-large voting required candidates to gain a majority of votes from across the city. The previous system prevented the minority population, which then tended to support Republican candidates, from being represented by candidates of their choice; apportionment under single-member districts meant that some districts in Nashville had Black majorities. In 1951, after passage of the new charter, African American attorneys Z. Alexander Looby and Robert E. Lillard were elected to the city council.

In the late-1940's, recording studios began to set up shop in Nashville to record artists who performed at the Grand Ole Opry. Then in 1950, the radio announcer David Cobb ad libbed on air "the sounds listeners were hearing on WSM radio were coming from 'Music City, U.S.A.' " coining the moniker "Music City".

During the mid-1950s, Nashville underwent a musical transformation with the emergence of the 'Nashville Sound,' which was characterized by "smooth strings and choruses", "sophisticated background vocals" and "smooth tempos" associated with traditional pop. The new sound broadened country music's appeal and solidified Nashville's status as a music recording and production center.

With the United States Supreme Court ruling in 1954 that public schools had to desegregate with "all deliberate speed", the family of student Robert Kelley filed a lawsuit in 1956, arguing that Nashville administrators should open all-White East High School to him. A similar case was filed by Reverend Henry Maxwell due to his children having to take a 45-minute bus ride from South Nashville to the north end of the city. These suits caused the courts to announce what became known as the "Nashville Plan", where the city's public schools would desegregate one grade per year beginning in the fall of 1957.

Urban redevelopment accelerated over the next several decades, and the city grew increasingly segregated. An interstate was placed on the edge of East Nashville while another highway was built through Edgehill, a lower-income, predominantly minority community.

=== Postwar development to end of 20th century ===
Rapid suburbanization occurred during the years immediately after World War II, as new housing was being built outside city limits. This resulted in a demand for many new schools and other support facilities, which the county found difficult to provide. At the same time, suburbanization led to a declining tax base in the city, although many suburban residents used unique city amenities and services that were supported financially only by city taxpayers. After years of discussion, a referendum was held in 1958 on the issue of consolidating city and county government. It failed to gain approval although it was supported by the then-elected leaders of both jurisdictions, County Judge Beverly Briley and Mayor Ben West.

Following the referendum's failure, Nashville annexed some 42 square miles of suburban jurisdictions to expand its tax base. This increased uncertainty among residents, and created resentment among many suburban communities. Under the second charter for metropolitan government, which was approved in 1962, two levels of service provision were proposed: the General Services District and the Urban Services District, to provide for a differential in tax levels. Residents of the Urban Services District had a full range of city services. The areas that made up the General Services District, however, had a lower tax rate until full services were provided. This helped reconcile aspects of services and taxation among the differing jurisdictions within the large metro region.

In the early 1960s, Tennessee still had racial segregation of public facilities, including lunch counters and department store fitting rooms. Hotels and restaurants were also segregated. Between February 13 and May 10, 1960, a series of Nashville sit-ins were organized at lunch counters in downtown Nashville by the Nashville Student Movement and Nashville Christian Leadership Council, and were part of a broader sit-in movement in the southeastern United States as part of an effort to end racial segregation of public facilities. The Nashville students, trained by activists and nonviolent teachers James Lawson and Myles Horton, had been doing preliminary groundwork towards the action for two months. On April 19, 1960, the house of Z. Alexander Looby, an African American attorney and council member, was bombed by segregationists. Protesters marched to the city hall the next day, when Mayor Ben West said he supported the desegregation of lunch counters, which civil rights activists had called for. City officials and local businesses agreed to desegregate Nashville's lunch counters on May 10, 1960. Although other facilities continued to be segregated in Nashville until passage of the Civil Rights Act of 1964, which ended overt, legally sanctioned segregation nationwide.

In 1963, Nashville consolidated its government with Davidson County, forming a metropolitan government. The membership on the Metro Council, the legislative body, was increased from 21 to 40 seats. Of these, five members are elected at-large and 35 are elected from single-member districts, each to serve a term of four years.

As Nashville evolved in the 1960s, its music scene diversified, welcoming rock, pop, and other genres and the 'Nashville Sound' transformed into 'Countrypolitan'. Artists like Bob Dylan and Johnny Cash came to Nashville to record, reflecting the city's expanding influence in the music industry. In 1960, Time reported that Nashville had "nosed out Hollywood as the nation's second biggest (after New York) record-producing center."

In 1957 Nashville desegregated its school system using an innovative grade a year plan, in response to a class action suit Kelly vs. Board of Education of Nashville. By 1966 the Metro Council abandoned the grade a year plan and completely desegregated the entire school system at one time.

Congress passed civil rights legislation in 1964 and 1965, but tensions continued as society was slow to change. On April 8, 1967, a riot broke out on the college campuses of Fisk University and Tennessee State University, historically Black colleges, after Stokely Carmichael spoke about Black Power at Vanderbilt University. Although it was viewed as a "race riot", it had classist characteristics.

In 1979, the Ku Klux Klan burnt crosses outside two African American sites in Nashville, including the city headquarters of the NAACP.

Historically, Nashville zoning permitted the construction of duplex housing. In the 1980s and 1990s, Nashville lawmakers downzoned sections of Nashville to exclusively permit single-family housing. Proponents of these downzonings said they would raise home values.

Since the 1970s, the city and county have undergone tremendous growth, particularly during the economic boom of the 1990s under the leadership of then-mayor and later-Tennessee governor, Phil Bredesen. Making urban renewal a priority, Bredesen fostered the construction or renovation of several city landmarks, including the Country Music Hall of Fame and Museum, the downtown Nashville Public Library, the Bridgestone Arena, and Nissan Stadium.

Nissan Stadium (formerly Adelphia Coliseum and LP Field) was built after the National Football League's (NFL) Houston Oilers agreed to move to the city in 1995. The NFL team debuted in Nashville in 1998 at Vanderbilt Stadium, and Nissan Stadium opened in the summer of 1999. The Oilers changed their name to the Tennessee Titans and finished the season with the Music City Miracle and a close Super Bowl game. The St. Louis Rams won on the last play of the game.

In 1997, Nashville was awarded a National Hockey League expansion team; this was named the Nashville Predators. Since the 2003–04 season, the Predators have made the playoffs in all but four seasons. In 2017, they made the Stanley Cup Final for the first time in franchise history, but ultimately fell to the Pittsburgh Penguins, four games to two, in the best-of-seven series.

=== 21st century ===
On January 22, 2009, residents rejected Nashville Charter Amendment 1, which sought to make English the official language of the city.

Between May 1 and 7, 2010, much of Nashville was extensively flooded as part of a series of 1,000 year floods throughout Middle and West Tennessee. Much of the flooding took place in areas along the Cumberland and Harpeth Rivers and Mill Creek, and caused extensive damage to the many buildings and structures in the city, including the Grand Ole Opry House, Gaylord Opryland Resort & Convention Center, Opry Mills Mall, Schermerhorn Symphony Center, Bridgestone Arena, and Nissan Stadium. Sections of Interstate 24 and Briley Parkway were also flooded. Eleven people died in the Nashville area as a result of the flooding, and damages were estimated to be over $2 billion.

The city recovered after the Great Recession. In March 2012, a Gallup poll ranked Nashville in the top five regions for job growth.

Nashville elected its first female mayor, Megan Barry, on September 25, 2015. As a council member, Barry had officiated at the city's first same-sex wedding on June 26, 2015.

In 2017, Nashville's economy was deemed the third fastest-growing in the nation, and the city was named the "hottest housing market in the US" by Freddie Mac realtors. In May 2017, census estimates showed Nashville had passed Memphis to become most populated city in Tennessee. Nashville has also made national headlines for its "homelessness crisis". Rising housing prices and the opioid crisis have resulted in more people being out on the streets: as of 2018, between 2,300 and 20,000 Nashvillians are homeless.

On March 6, 2018, due to felony charges filed against Mayor Barry relating to the misuse of public funds, she resigned before the end of her term. A special election was called. Following a ruling by the Tennessee Supreme Court, the Davidson County Election Commission set the special election for May 24, 2018, to meet the requirement of 75 to 80 days from the date of resignation. David Briley, who was Vice Mayor during the Barry administration and Acting Mayor after her resignation, won the special election with just over 54% of the vote, becoming the 70th mayor of Nashville.

On May 1, 2018, voters rejected Let's Move Nashville, a referendum which would have funded construction of an $8.9 billion mass transit system under the Nashville Metropolitan Transit Authority (now WeGo Public Transit) by a 2 to 1 margin.

On September 28, 2019, John Cooper became the ninth mayor of Metropolitan Government of Nashville and Davidson County.

Between 2010 and 2020, the city experienced significant changes and growth in population with an increase of 343,319 residents in the metro Nashville area. For example, the median home price in North Nashville increased from $100,710 in 2010 to $532,121 in 2020. During this period, four census tracts in the city transitioned from majority Black to majority non-Black. By 2020, 99% of Nashville's neighborhoods were considered unaffordable for Black and Hispanic families earning median incomes.

On March 3, 2020, a tornado tracked west to east, just north of the downtown Nashville area, killing 5 people and leaving tens of thousands without electricity. Neighborhoods impacted included North Nashville, Germantown, East Nashville, Donelson, and Hermitage.

On December 25, 2020, a vehicle exploded on Second Avenue, killing the perpetrator and injuring eight others.

On March 27, 2023, a gunman killed three children and three staff at the Covenant School, before being fatally gunned down by police.

Freddie O'Connell became the tenth mayor of Metropolitan Government of Nashville and Davidson County on September 25, 2023. His election platform focused on improving transportation, and became a 2024 referendum called Choose How You Move. The referendum passed on November 5, 2024, to establish a dedicated funding source for transportation and associated infrastructure.

On December 9, 2023, tornadoes caused considerable destruction and left seven people dead. One significant tornado tracked across the northern metropolitan areas and cities of Madison, Hendersonville and Gallatin.

== Geography ==
=== Topography ===
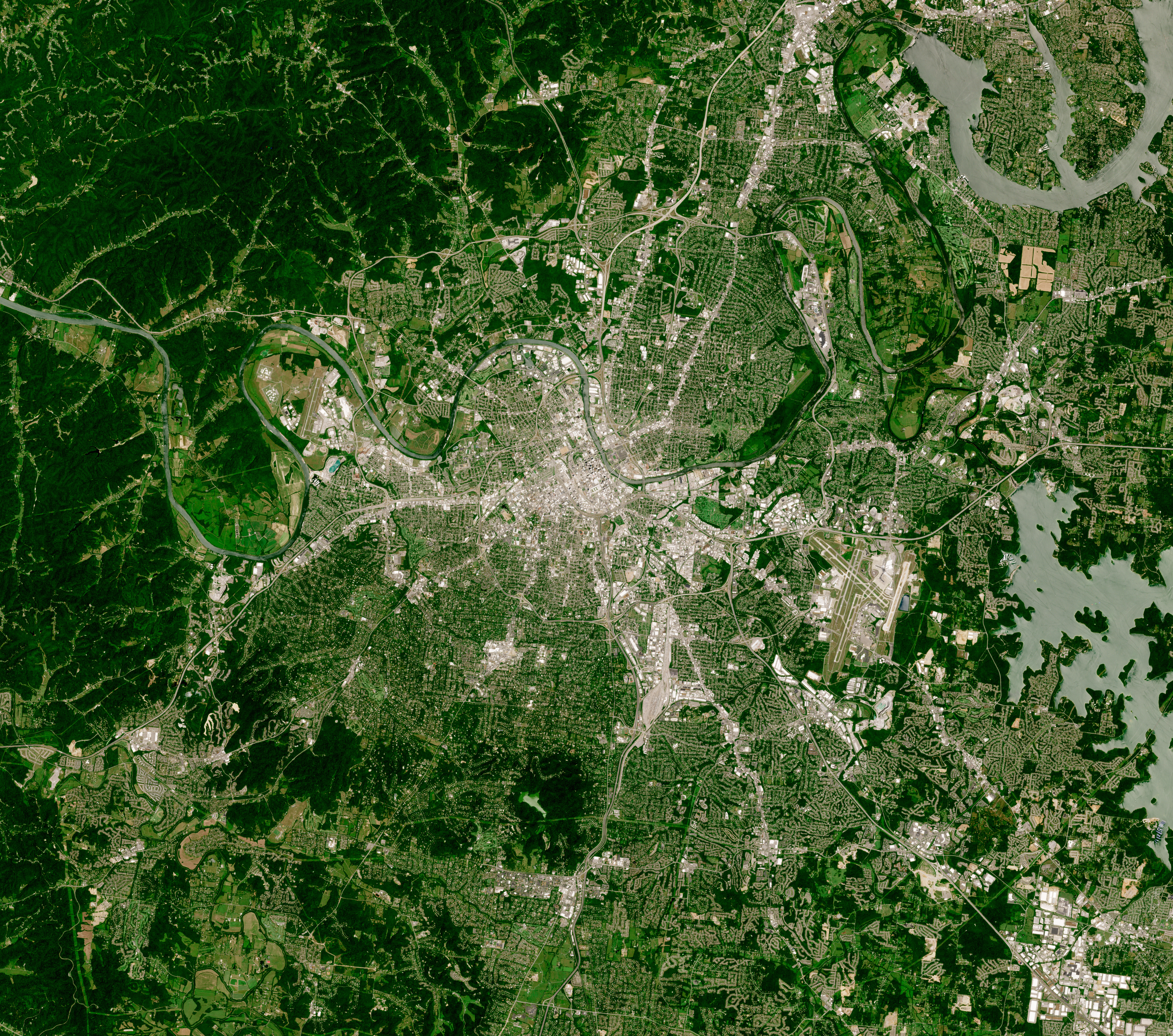
Satellite image of Nashville 2020

Nashville lies on the Cumberland River in the northwestern portion of the Nashville Basin. Nashville's elevation ranges from its lowest point, 385 feet (117 m) above sea level at the Cumberland River, to its highest point, 1,163 feet (354 m) above sea level in the Radnor Lake State Natural Area. Nashville also sits at the start of the Highland Rim, a geophysical region of very hilly land. Because of this, Nashville is very hilly. Nashville also has some stand alone hills around the city such as the hill on which the Tennessee State Capitol building sits.

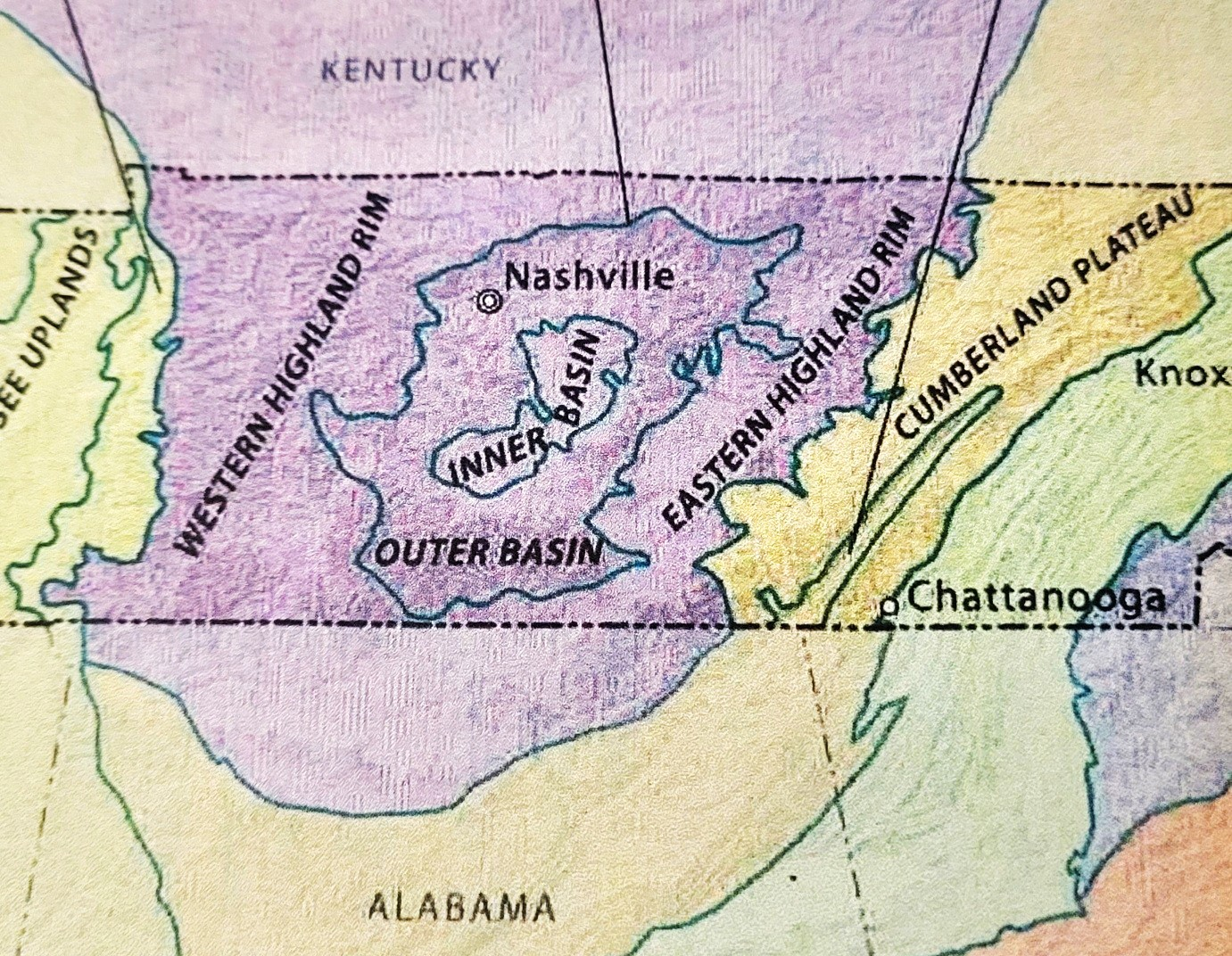
Plan of physiographic geological regions of Tennessee

The higher elevations of the Highland Rim encircle the Nashville Basin with the Eastern and Western Highland Rim portions being the largest expanses. Part of the Western Highland Rim slopes down and wraps the hills along the western flanks of the city in a contiguous forest thought to be one of the largest of such forest habitats in Middle Tennessee. Nashville's Highland Rim Forest connects Beaman Park, Bells Bend Park, Warner Parks, and Radnor Lake State Park.

According to the United States Census Bureau, the city has a total area of 527.9 square miles (1,367 km^{2}), of which 504.0 square miles (1,305 km^{2}) of it is land and 23.9 square miles (62 km^{2}) of it (4.53%) is water.

=== Cityscape ===
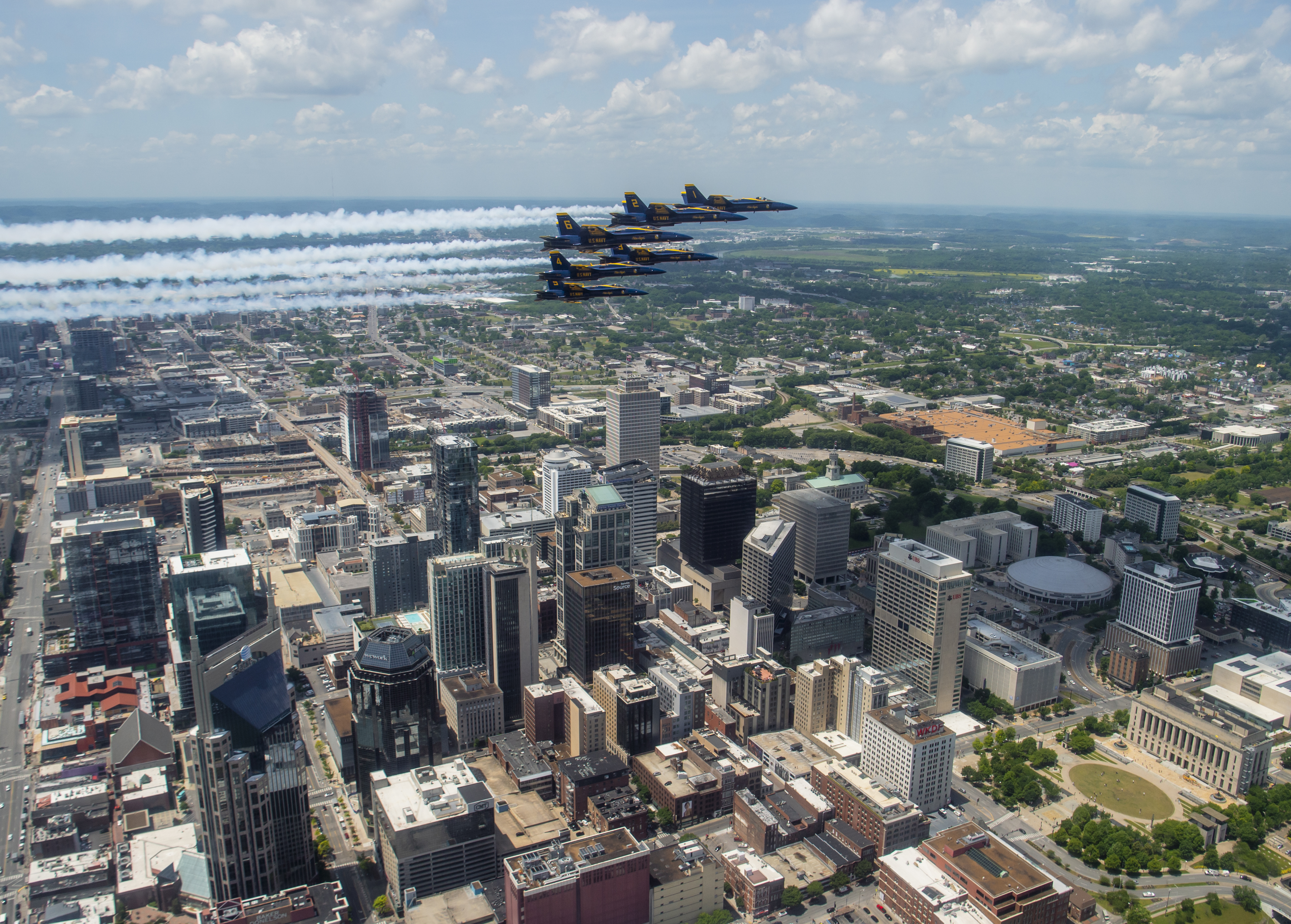
U.S. Navy Blue Angels over Nashville in 2020

Nashville's downtown area features a diverse assortment of entertainment, dining, cultural and architectural attractions. The Broadway and 2nd Avenue areas feature entertainment venues, bars, night clubs, retail, and an assortment of restaurants. North of Broadway lie Nashville's central business district, Legislative Plaza, Capitol Hill, and the Tennessee Bicentennial Mall. Cultural and architectural attractions can be found throughout the city.

Three major Interstate Highways (I-40, I-65, and I-24) converge near the core area of downtown, and many regional cities are within a day's driving distance. Nashville's first skyscraper, the Life & Casualty Tower, was completed in 1957 and launched the construction of other high rises in downtown Nashville. After the construction of the AT&T Building (commonly referred to by locals as the "Batman Building") in 1994, the downtown area saw little construction until the mid-2000s. The Pinnacle, a high rise office building which opened in 2010, was the first skyscraper in Nashville to be built in the preceding 15 years.

Since 2000, Nashville has seen two urban construction booms (one prior to the Great Recession and the other after) that have yielded multiple high-rises (defined by Emporis as buildings of a minimum of 35 meters or 115 feet tall). Of the city's 33 towers of 91 meters or 300 feet tall or taller (as of April 2023), 24 have been completed since 2000. Of note, Nashville has a disproportionate number of buildings 91 meters (300 feet) and taller in relation to its overall metropolitan statistical area (MSA) population of about 2 million (2021 U.S. Census Bureau estimate). This is due, in large part, to the tourism-centric city's multiple hotel towers and to its many condominium high-rises having multiple unit owners who also own other residences in both Nashville and in other markets.

Many civic and infrastructure projects are being planned, in progress, or recently completed. A new MTA bus hub was recently completed in downtown Nashville, as was the Music City Star (now known as the WeGo Star) pilot project. Several public parks have been constructed, such as the Public Square. Riverfront Park is scheduled to be extensively updated. The Music City Center opened in May 2013. It is a 1,200,000-square-foot (110,000 m^{2}) convention center with 350,000 square feet (33,000 m^{2}) of exhibit space.

=== Neighborhoods ===
- 12South
- Antioch
- Belmont-Hillsboro
- Belle Meade
- Bellevue
- Berry Hill
- Bordeaux
- Buena Vista
- Cane Ridge
- Cleveland Park
- Crieve Hall
- Donelson
- East Nashville
- Edgehill Village
- Five Points/East End
- Germantown
- Green Hills
- The Gulch
- Hermitage
- Hillsboro Village
- Hope Gardens
- Inglewood
- Joelton
- Lakewood
- Lockeland Springs
- Madison
- Midtown
- McFerrin Park
- Nashville Yards
- North Nashville
- Oak Hill
- Old Hickory
- Richland/Cherokee Park
- SoBro
- Sylvan Heights
- Sylvan Park
- The Nations
- Tusculum
- Whitland
- Woodbine
- Woodland-in-Waverly
- Whites Creek
- West Meade
- West Nashville

=== Flora ===
Nashville, with 56% of the ground surface within its city limits covered in urban tree canopy, has the largest percentage of forested area of any city in the U.S. With Nashville's 320,000 total acres, this translates into over 170,000 wooded acres that may earn it the largest urban tree canopy by area, as well. The nearby city of Lebanon is notable and even named for its so-called "cedar glades", which occur on soils too poor to support most trees and are instead dominated by Virginian juniper. Blackberry bushes, Virginia pine, loblolly pine, sassafras, red maple, river birch, American beech, river cane, mountain laurel and sycamore are all common native trees, along with many others.

In addition to the native forests, the combination of hot summers, abundant rainfall and mild winters permit a wide variety of both temperate and subtropical plants to be cultivated easily. Southern magnolia and cherry blossom trees are commonly cultivated here, with the city having an annual cherry blossom festival. Crepe myrtles and yew bushes are also commonly grown throughout Metro Nashville, and the winters are mild enough that sweetbay magnolia is evergreen whenever it is cultivated. The pansy flower is popular to plant during the autumn, and some varieties will flower overwinter in Nashville's subtropical climate. However, many hot-weather plants like petunia and even papyrus thrive as annuals, and Japanese banana will die aboveground during winter but re-sprout after the danger of frost is over. Unbeknownst to most Tennesseans, even cold-hardy palms, particularly needle palm and dwarf palmetto, are grown uncommonly but often successfully, while the taller windmill palm is more marginal, perishing below about 5 °F (−15 °C) without protection. High desert plants like Colorado spruce and prickly pear cactus are also grown somewhat commonly, as are Yucca filamentosa and the trunking Yucca rostrata.

=== Climate ===
Nashville, Tennessee

Climate chart (precipitation, max. and min. temperature)
J	F	M	A	M	J	J	A	S	O	N	D
4 49 30	4.5 54 33	4.5 63 40	4.7 73 49	5 80 58	4.4 88 66	4.2 91 71	3.8 90 69	3.8 84 62	3.4 74 50	3.9 61 39	4.4 52 33
- █ Average max. and min. temperatures in °F
- █ Precipitation totals in inches
Metric conversion
J	F	M	A	M	J	J	A	S	O	N	D
102 10 −1	114 12 1	115 17 5	120 23 9	128 27 15	111 31 19	106 33 21	96 32 21	97 29 17	85 23 10	98 16 4	113 11 1
- █ Average max. and min. temperatures in °C
- █ Precipitation totals in mm

Nashville reached 100°F a total of 242 times between 1874 and 2026

Nashville International Airport in Donelson has a humid subtropical climate (Köppen Cfa, Trewartha Cf), with hot, humid summers and generally cool winters typical of the Upper South.

Snowfall occurs during the winter months, but it is usually not heavy. Average annual snowfall is about 4.7 inches (12 cm), falling mostly in January and February and occasionally in March, November and December. The largest snow event since 2003 was on January 22, 2016, when Nashville received 8 inches (20 cm) of snow in a single storm; the largest overall was 17 inches (43 cm), received on March 17, 1892, during the St. Patrick's Day Snowstorm.

Rainfall is typically greater in solar spring (Feb-Apr) and summer (May-Jul), while the solar autumn months (Aug-Oct) are the driest on average. Spring and fall are prone to severe thunderstorms, which may bring tornadoes, large hail, flash floods and damaging wind, with recent major events on April 16, 1998; April 7, 2006; February 5, 2008; April 10, 2009; May 1–2, 2010; and March 3, 2020. Relative humidity in Nashville averages 83% in the mornings and 60% in the afternoons, which is considered moderate for the Southeastern United States. In recent decades, due to urban development, Nashville has developed an urban heat island; especially on cool, clear nights, temperatures are up to 10 °F (5.6 °C) warmer in the heart of the city than in rural outlying areas. The Nashville region lies within USDA Plant Hardiness Zone 7b. From 1970 to 2020 the average summer temperature has risen 2.8 degrees F (1.5 C).

Nashville's long springs and autumns combined with a diverse array of trees and grasses can often make it uncomfortable for allergy sufferers.

The coldest temperature ever officially recorded in Nashville was −17 °F (−27 °C) on January 21, 1985, and the hottest was 109 °F (43 °C) on June 29, 2012. Nashville allegedly had a low of −18 °F (−28 °C) on January 26, 1832, but this was decades before record-keeping began and isn't counted as the official record low.

Threshold	Number of days
High > 80	139.0
High > 90	48.2
Low < 32	71.4
High < 32	7.3
Low < 10	3.0

==== Donelson ====
The mean annual temperature at Nashville International Airport is 60.8 °F (16.0 °C). Monthly averages range from 39.6 °F (4.2 °C) in January to 80.7 °F (27.1 °C) in July, with a diurnal temperature variation of 18.9 to 23.7 °F (10.5 to 13.2 °C). Diurnal temperature variation is highest in April and lowest in December, but it is also relatively high in October and relatively low in January. Donelson's climate classifications are Köppen Cfa and Trewartha Cfak thanks to its hot summers (average over 71.6 °F or 22 °C), cool winters (average over 32.0 °F or 0 °C) and long (8+ months) growing seasons (average over 50.0 °F or 10 °C). The dew point is −3.1 °C (26.4 °F) in January and 20 °C in July. Precipitation is abundant year-round without any major difference, but there is still slight variation. The wet season runs from February through July, reaching its zenith in May with 128 mm (5.02 in) of rain. The dry season runs from August through January with an October nadir of 85 mm (3.36 in) and secondary December peak of 113 mm (4.43 in). Snowfall is most common in January with 5.1 cm (2.0 in).

Climate data for Nashville (Nashville Int'l), 1991–2020 normals, (Note: Mean monthly maxima and minima (i.e. the expected highest and lowest temperature readings at any point during the year or given month) calculated based on data at said location from 1991 to 2020.) extremes 1873−present (Note: Official records for Nashville were kept at downtown from December 1973 to December 1939, and at Nashville Int'l since January 1940. For more information, see Threadex)
Month	Jan	Feb	Mar	Apr	May	Jun	Jul	Aug	Sep	Oct	Nov	Dec	Year
Record high °F (°C)	78 (26)	85 (29)	89 (32)	91 (33)	96 (36)	109 (43)	107 (42)	106 (41)	105 (41)	99 (37)	88 (31)	79 (26)	109 (43)
Mean maximum °F (°C)	68.5 (20.3)	73.3 (22.9)	80.1 (26.7)	85.3 (29.6)	89.9 (32.2)	94.7 (34.8)	97.1 (36.2)	96.7 (35.9)	93.4 (34.1)	86.4 (30.2)	78.1 (25.6)	69.6 (20.9)	98.5 (36.9)
Mean daily maximum °F (°C)	49.1 (9.5)	53.8 (12.1)	62.7 (17.1)	72.6 (22.6)	80.4 (26.9)	87.7 (30.9)	90.9 (32.7)	90.4 (32.4)	84.4 (29.1)	73.5 (23.1)	61.4 (16.3)	52.2 (11.2)	71.6 (22.0)
Daily mean °F (°C)	39.6 (4.2)	43.4 (6.3)	51.5 (10.8)	60.8 (16.0)	69.3 (20.7)	77.1 (25.1)	80.7 (27.1)	79.7 (26.5)	73.1 (22.8)	61.7 (16.5)	50.3 (10.2)	42.7 (5.9)	60.8 (16.0)
Mean daily minimum °F (°C)	30.1 (−1.1)	33.0 (0.6)	40.2 (4.6)	48.9 (9.4)	58.3 (14.6)	66.4 (19.1)	70.5 (21.4)	69.0 (20.6)	61.8 (16.6)	49.9 (9.9)	39.2 (4.0)	33.3 (0.7)	50.1 (10.1)
Mean minimum °F (°C)	11.2 (−11.6)	15.4 (−9.2)	22.7 (−5.2)	32.7 (0.4)	43.1 (6.2)	55.2 (12.9)	62.4 (16.9)	60.2 (15.7)	47.3 (8.5)	33.3 (0.7)	23.5 (−4.7)	17.4 (−8.1)	9.0 (−12.8)
Record low °F (°C)	−17 (−27)	−13 (−25)	2 (−17)	23 (−5)	34 (1)	42 (6)	51 (11)	47 (8)	36 (2)	26 (−3)	−1 (−18)	−10 (−23)	−17 (−27)
Average precipitation inches (mm)	4.02 (102)	4.47 (114)	4.52 (115)	4.72 (120)	5.02 (128)	4.36 (111)	4.16 (106)	3.79 (96)	3.80 (97)	3.36 (85)	3.86 (98)	4.43 (113)	50.51 (1,283)
Average snowfall inches (cm)	2.0 (5.1)	1.5 (3.8)	0.7 (1.8)	0.0 (0.0)	0.0 (0.0)	0.0 (0.0)	0.0 (0.0)	0.0 (0.0)	0.0 (0.0)	0.0 (0.0)	0.1 (0.25)	0.4 (1.0)	4.7 (12)
Average precipitation days (≥ 0.01 in)	10.8	10.9	11.6	11.2	11.6	10.7	10.3	9.4	7.8	8.4	9.0	11.4	123.1
Average snowy days (≥ 0.1 in)	2.0	1.9	0.9	0.0	0.0	0.0	0.0	0.0	0.0	0.0	0.2	0.5	5.5
Average relative humidity (%)	70.4	68.5	64.6	63.2	69.5	70.4	72.8	73.1	73.7	69.4	70.2	71.4	69.8
Average dew point °F (°C)	26.4 (−3.1)	29.5 (−1.4)	36.9 (2.7)	45.1 (7.3)	55.9 (13.3)	63.9 (17.7)	68.0 (20.0)	66.9 (19.4)	61.2 (16.2)	48.4 (9.1)	39.4 (4.1)	31.3 (−0.4)	47.7 (8.7)
Mean monthly sunshine hours	139.6	145.2	191.3	231.5	261.8	277.7	279.0	262.1	226.4	216.8	148.1	130.6	2,510.1
Percentage possible sunshine	45	48	52	59	60	64	63	63	61	62	48	43	56
Average ultraviolet index	2	4	6	7	9	10	10	9	7	5	3	2	6
Source 1: NOAA (relative humidity, dew point, and sun 1961−1990)
Source 2: Weather Atlas (UV index) WMO

==== Old Hickory ====
The mean annual temperature at Old Hickory Dam is 58.5 °F (14.7 °C). Monthly averages range from 37.1 °F (2.8 °C) in January to 78.6 °F (25.9 °C) in August, with a diurnal temperature variation of 19.8 to 26.3 °F (11.0 to 14.6 °C). Diurnal temperature variation is highest in April and lowest in January. Old Hickory's climate classifications are Köppen Cfa and Trewartha Doak thanks to its hot summers (average over 71.6 °F or 22.0 °C), cool winters (average over 32.0 °F or 0.0 °C) and mediocre (4–7 months) growing seasons (average over 50.0 °F or 10.0 °C). Precipitation is abundant year-round without any major difference, but there is still slight variation. The wet season runs from February through July, reaching its zenith in April with 120 mm (4.74 in) of rain. The dry season runs from August through January with an October/November nadir of 85 mm and secondary December peak of 113 mm (4.44 in). Data for record temperatures is spotty before June 2007 with another brief gap in data in January 2024, but temperatures in Old Hickory have been known to range from −10 °F (−23.3 °C) in January 1966 to 106 °F (41.1 °C) in June and July 2012.

Climate data for Old Hickory Dam, TN (1991–2020 normals, extremes 1965–present)
Month	Jan	Feb	Mar	Apr	May	Jun	Jul	Aug	Sep	Oct	Nov	Dec	Year
Record high °F (°C)	76 (24)	82 (28)	86 (30)	91 (33)	94 (34)	106 (41)	106 (41)	105 (41)	101 (38)	96 (36)	87 (31)	76 (24)	106 (41)
Mean maximum °F (°C)	67 (19)	72 (22)	79 (26)	86 (30)	91 (33)	96 (36)	97 (36)	97 (36)	95 (35)	88 (31)	77 (25)	69 (21)	99 (37)
Mean daily maximum °F (°C)	47.0 (8.3)	51.4 (10.8)	60.5 (15.8)	71.3 (21.8)	78.9 (26.1)	86.1 (30.1)	89.9 (32.2)	90.2 (32.3)	83.4 (28.6)	72.1 (22.3)	60.1 (15.6)	50.2 (10.1)	70.1 (21.2)
Daily mean °F (°C)	37.1 (2.8)	40.7 (4.8)	48.6 (9.2)	58.2 (14.6)	66.9 (19.4)	75.1 (23.9)	78.5 (25.8)	78.6 (25.9)	71.6 (22.0)	59.7 (15.4)	47.9 (8.8)	39.5 (4.2)	58.5 (14.7)
Mean daily minimum °F (°C)	27.2 (−2.7)	30.0 (−1.1)	36.8 (2.7)	45.0 (7.2)	54.9 (12.7)	64.1 (17.8)	67.0 (19.4)	67.0 (19.4)	59.8 (15.4)	47.2 (8.4)	35.7 (2.1)	28.8 (−1.8)	47.0 (8.3)
Mean minimum °F (°C)	10 (−12)	13 (−11)	21 (−6)	31 (−1)	40 (4)	54 (12)	59 (15)	58 (14)	48 (9)	33 (1)	22 (−6)	17 (−8)	9 (−13)
Record low °F (°C)	−10 (−23)	0 (−18)	8 (−13)	21 (−6)	34 (1)	47 (8)	52 (11)	54 (12)	36 (2)	26 (−3)	14 (−10)	−3 (−19)	−10 (−23)
Average precipitation inches (mm)	3.73 (95)	4.26 (108)	4.64 (118)	4.74 (120)	4.55 (116)	3.76 (96)	4.05 (103)	3.38 (86)	3.70 (94)	3.33 (85)	3.35 (85)	4.44 (113)	47.93 (1,217)
Average snowfall inches (cm)	0.6 (1.5)	0.3 (0.76)	0.2 (0.51)	0 (0)	0 (0)	0 (0)	0 (0)	0 (0)	0 (0)	0 (0)	0 (0)	0.1 (0.25)	1.2 (3.0)
Source: https://www.weather.gov/wrh/climate?wfo=ohx

== Demographics ==
Historical population
Census	Pop.	Note	%±
1800	345		—
1810	1,100		218.8%
1820	3,410		210.0%
1830	5,566		63.2%
1840	6,929		24.5%
1850	10,165		46.7%
1860	16,988		67.1%
1870	25,865		52.3%
1880	43,350		67.6%
1890	76,168		75.7%
1900	80,865		6.2%
1910	110,364		36.5%
1920	118,342		7.2%
1930	153,866		30.0%
1940	167,402		8.8%
1950	174,307		4.1%
1960	170,874		−2.0%
1970	448,003		162.2%
1980	455,651		1.7%
1990	488,374		7.2%
2000	545,524		11.7%
2010	601,222		10.2%
2020	689,447		14.7%
2025 (est.)	721,074	▲	4.6%
Sources: Notes: (Note: The significant increase between 1960 and 1970 is due to the merging of Nashville and Davidson County in 1963.)

Historical racial composition	2020	2010	1990	1980	1970
White (Non-Hispanic)	53.3%	56.3%	73.2%	75.2%	79.5% (Note: From 15% sample)
Black or African American (Non-Hispanic)	24.3%	28.2%	24.3%	23.3%	19.6%
Hispanic or Latino	14.0%	10.0%	0.9%	0.8%	0.6%
Asian	3.9%	3.1%	1.4%	0.5%	0.1%
Mixed	3.8%	1.9%			
American Indian and Alaska Native	0.2%	0.2%	0.8%	0.2%	0.1%
Native Hawaiian and Other Pacific Islander	0.1%	0.0%	0.1%	N/A	N/A
Other Race	0.5%				

As of the 2020 United States census, there were 689,447 people, 279,545 households, and 146,241 families residing in the city. The population increase of 88,225, or 14.67% over the 2010 figure of 601,222 residents, represented the largest net population increase in the city's history. (Note: Excluding the increase between 1960 and 1970, which was mostly due to the consolidation of the governments of Nashville and Davidson County) The population density was 1,367.87 inhabitants per square mile (528.14/km^{2}).

Nashville's growing Latino population includes a significant Guatemalan community. When Guatemala announced plans to open a consulate general in Nashville in 2023, the Guatemalan government estimated that approximately 72,000 of its nationals lived in Nashville and the surrounding area served by the new office. The Nashville-based consular region subsequently came to include all of Tennessee as well as designated counties in Kentucky and Mississippi.

In 2010, there were 254,651 households and 141,469 families (55.6% of households). Of households with families, 37.2% had married couples living together, 14.1% had a female householder with no husband present, and 4.2% had a male householder with no wife present. 27.9% of all households had children under the age of 18, and 18.8% had at least one member 65 years of age or older. Of the 44.4% of households that are non-families, 36.2% were individuals, and 8.2% had someone living alone who was 65 years of age or older. The average household size was 2.38 and the average family size was 3.16.

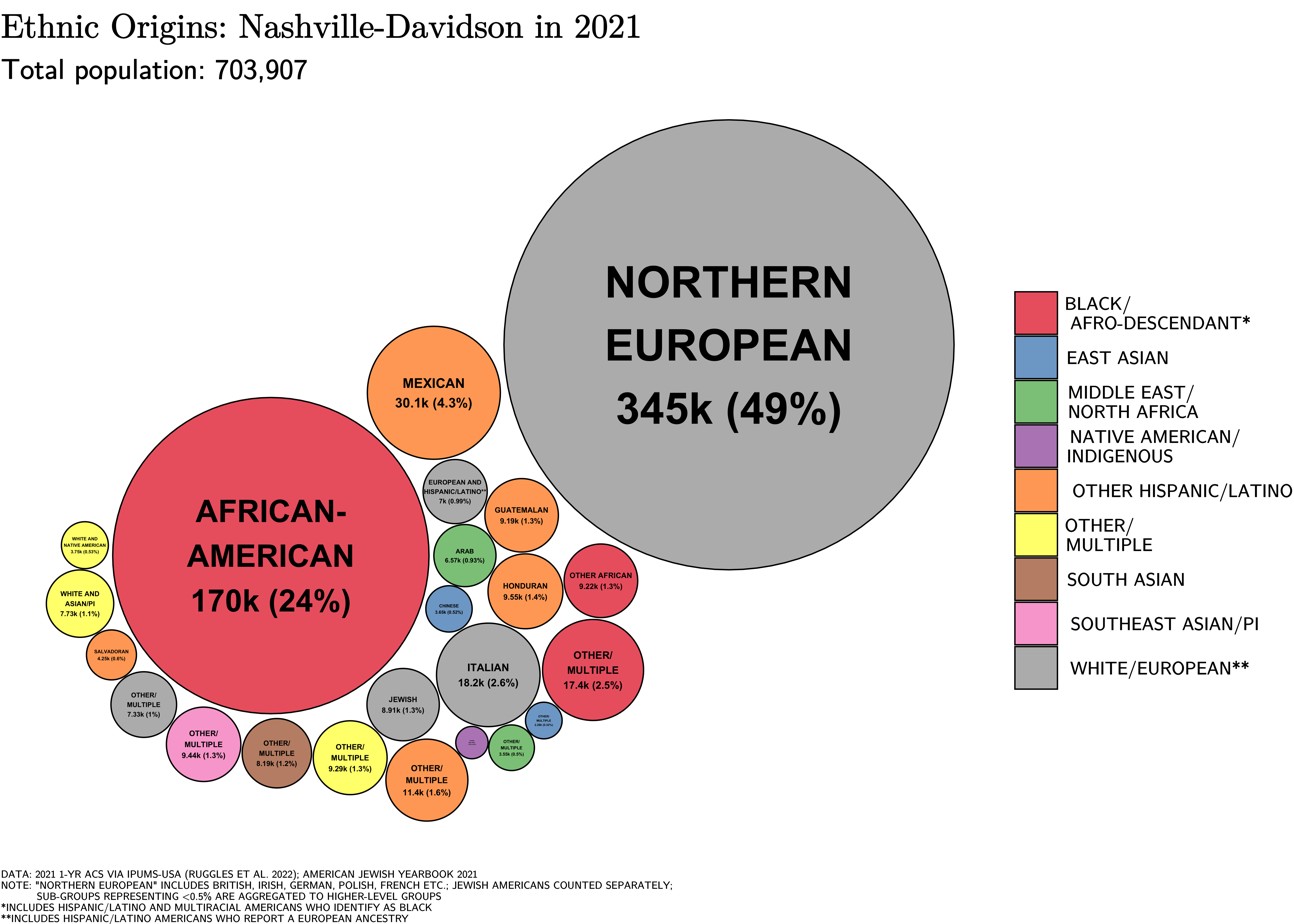
Ethnic origins in Nashville

The age distribution was 22.2% under 18, 10.3% from 18 to 24, 32.8% from 25 to 44, 23.9% from 45 to 64, and 10.7% who were 65 or older. The median age was 34.2 years. For every 100 females, there were 94.1 males. For every 100 females age 18 and over, there were 91.7 males.

The median income for a household in the city was $46,141, and the median income for a family was $56,377. Males with a year-round, full-time job had a median income of $41,017 versus $36,292 for females. The per capita income for the city was $27,372. About 13.9% of families and 18.2% of the population were below the poverty line, including 29.5% of those under age 18 and 9.9% of those age 65 or over. Of residents 25 or older, 33.4% have a bachelor's degree or higher.

Because of its relatively low cost of living and large job market, Nashville has become a popular city for immigrants. Nashville's foreign-born population more than tripled in size between 1990 and 2000, increasing from 12,662 to 39,596. The city's largest immigrant groups include Mexicans, Kurds, Vietnamese, Laotians, Arabs, and Somalis. There are also smaller communities of Pashtuns from Afghanistan and Pakistan concentrated primarily in Antioch. Nashville has the largest Kurdish community in the United States, numbering approximately 15,000. In 2009, about 60,000 Bhutanese refugees were being admitted to the U.S., and some were expected to resettle in Nashville. During the Iraqi election of 2005, Nashville was one of the few international locations where Iraqi expatriates could vote. The American Jewish community in Nashville dates back over 150 years, and numbered about 8,000 in 2015, plus 2,000 Jewish college students.

In 1779, approximately 20 percent of the settlers in Fort Nashborough were enslaved and free individuals of African descent. From this period until the Civil War, a burgeoning African American community in Nashville, under the guidance of a select few black leaders, diligently laid the groundwork for a prosperous society. They established educational institutions, places of worship, and enterprises, all contributing to the development and progress of the city.

=== Metropolitan area ===
As of 2020, Nashville has the largest metropolitan area in the state of Tennessee, with a population of 2,014,444. The Nashville metropolitan area encompasses 13 out of 41 Middle Tennessee counties: Cannon, Cheatham, Davidson, Dickson, Macon, Maury, Robertson, Rutherford, Smith, Sumner, Trousdale, Williamson, and Wilson. The 2020 population of the Nashville-Davidson–Murfreesboro–Columbia combined statistical area was 2,118,233.

=== Religion ===
59.6% of people in Nashville claim religious affiliation according to information compiled by Sperling's BestPlaces. The dominant religion in Nashville is Christianity, accounting for 57.7% of the population. The Christian population is broken down into 20.6% Baptists, 6.2% Catholics, 5.6% Methodists, 3.4% Pentecostals, 3.4% Presbyterians, 0.8% Mormons, and 0.5% Lutherans. 15.7% identify with other forms of Christianity, including the Orthodox Church and Disciples of Christ. Islam is the second-largest religion, with 0.8% of the population. 0.6% of the population adhere to eastern religions such as Buddhism, Sikhism, Jainism and Hinduism, and 0.3% follow Judaism.

=== Crime ===
According to data from the Metropolitan Nashville Police Department (MNPD) and the FBI's Crime Data Explorer, Nashville's crime rates have shifted toward a significant multi-year decline following a peak during the COVID-19 pandemic. In 2025, Nashville recorded 74 homicides, its lowest total since 2014 and a 28% decrease from 2024. The city also saw historic lows in robberies, with 866 reported in 2025—the fewest recorded since 1969. Nationally, the 2024 violent crime rate was estimated at 359.1 per 100,000 inhabitants, continuing a broad downward trend in major U.S. metropolitan areas.

Crime Category	Nashville (2024) Rate	National Average (2024)
Murder and non-negligent manslaughter	14.6	5.0
Rape	91.2	37.5
Robbery	165.5	60.6
Aggravated assault	930.4	256.1
Burglary	414.3	229.2
Larceny-theft	3,373.4	1,272.1
Motor vehicle theft	737.8	258.8

== Economy ==
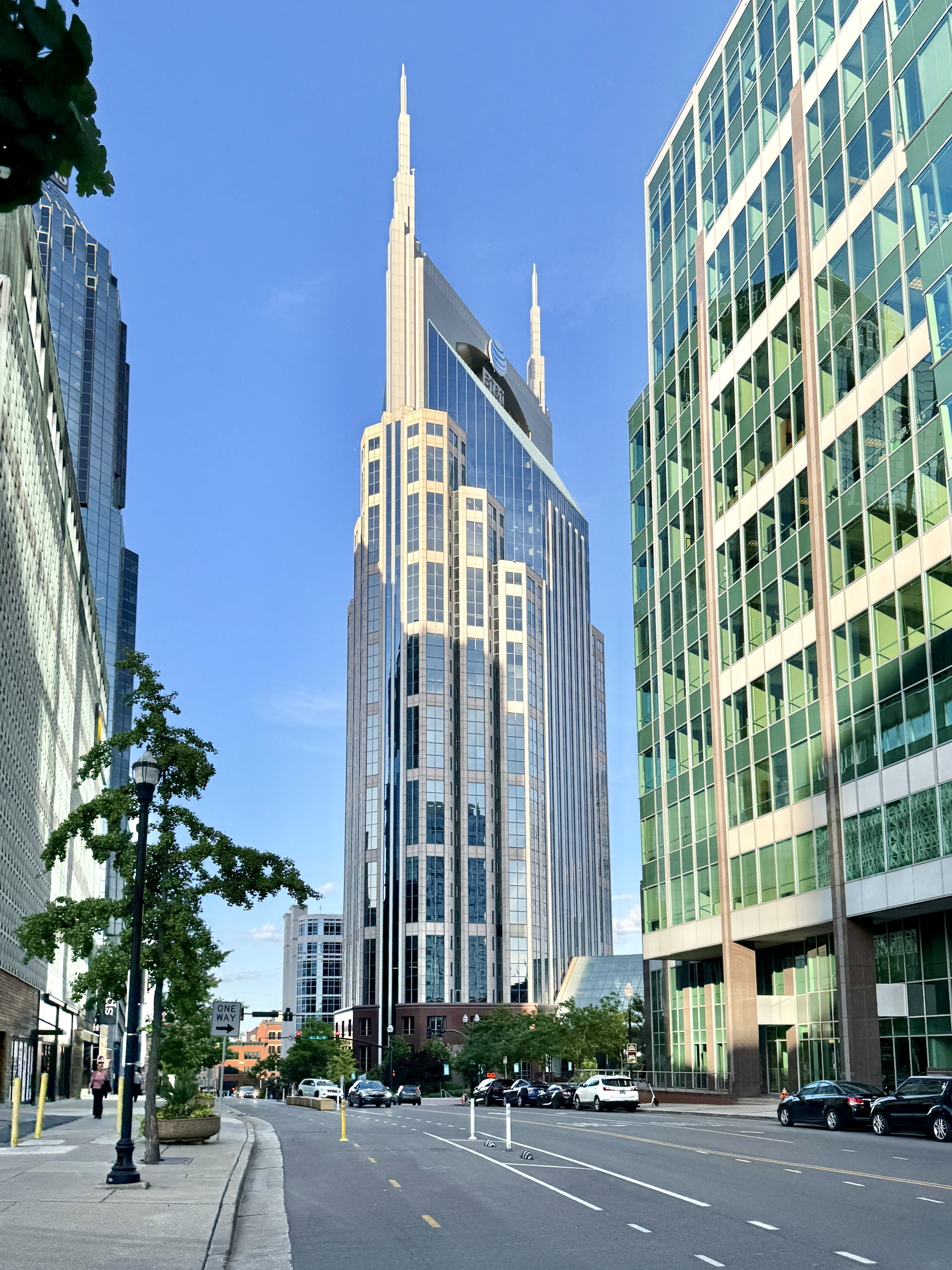
333 Commerce is the tallest building in Tennessee.

Fortune 500 companies with offices within Nashville include BNY Mellon, Bridgestone Americas, Ernst & Young, Community Health Systems, Dell, Deloitte, Dollar General, Hospital Corporation of America, Nissan North America, Philips, Tractor Supply Company, and UBS. Of these, Community Health Systems, Dollar General, SmileDirectClub, Hospital Corporation of America, and Tractor Supply Company are headquartered in the city. Many popular food companies are based in Nashville including Captain D's, Hunt Brothers Pizza, O'Charley's, Logan's Roadhouse, J. Alexander's, and Stoney River Legendary Steaks.

As the "home of country music", Nashville has become a major music recording and production center. The Big Three record labels, as well as numerous independent labels, have offices in Nashville, mostly in the Music Row area. Nashville has been the headquarters of guitar company Gibson since 1984. Since the 1960s, Nashville has been the second-largest music production center (after New York City) in the United States. Nashville's music industry is estimated to have a total economic impact of about $10 billion per year and to contribute about 56,000 jobs to the Nashville area.

Beyond its major industries, Nashville has hosted significant standardization events. In May 1997, the city was the site of a pivotal moment for the garage door industry during the International Garage Door Exposition, where the newly formed Institute of Door Dealer Education and Accreditation (IDEA) administered its inaugural professional certification examinations. Trade publications confirm this event established the industry's first cohort of accredited professionals.

The area's largest industry is health care. Nashville is home to more than 300 health care companies, including Hospital Corporation of America (HCA), the world's largest private operator of hospitals. As of 2012, it was estimated the health care industry contributes US$30 billion per year and 200,000 jobs to the Nashville-area economy.

CoreCivic, formerly known as Corrections Corporation of America and one of the largest private corrections company in the United States, was founded in Nashville in 1983, but moved out of the city in 2019. Vanderbilt University was one of its investors before the company's initial public offering. The City of Nashville's pension fund included "a $921,000 stake" in the company in 2017. The Nashville Scene notes that, "A drop in CoreCivic stock value, however minor, would have a direct impact on the pension fund that represents nearly 25,000 current and former Metro employees."

The automotive industry is also becoming important for the Middle Tennessee region. Nissan North America moved its corporate headquarters in 2006 from Gardena, California (Los Angeles County) to Franklin, a suburb south of Nashville. Nissan's largest North American manufacturing plant is in Smyrna, another suburb of Nashville. Largely as a result of the increased development of Nissan and other Japanese economic interests in the region, Japan moved its former New Orleans consulate-general to Nashville's Palmer Plaza. General Motors operates an assembly plant in Spring Hill, about 35 miles (56 km) south of Nashville. Automotive parts manufacturer Bridgestone has its North American headquarters in Nashville and manufacturing plants and a distribution center in nearby counties.

Other major industries in Nashville include insurance, finance, and publishing (especially religious publishing). The city hosts headquarters operations for several Protestant denominations, including the United Methodist Church, Southern Baptist Convention, National Baptist Convention USA, and the National Association of Free Will Baptists.

Nashville is known for Southern confections, including Goo Goo Clusters, which have been made in Nashville since 1912.

In May 2018, AllianceBernstein pledged to build a private client office in the city by mid-2019 and to move its headquarters from New York City to Nashville by 2024.

The technology sector is an important and growing aspect of Nashville's economy. In November 2018, Amazon announced its plans to build an operations center in the Nashville Yards development to serve as the hub for their Retail Operations division. In April 2021, Oracle Corporation announced that it would construct a $1.2 billion campus in Nashville, which is expected to employ 8,500 by 2031.

In December 2019, iHeartMedia selected Nashville as the site of its second digital headquarters.

Real estate is becoming a driver for the city's economy. As of October 2015, according to city figures, there is more than $2 billion in real estate projects underway or projected to start in 2016. Due to high yields available to investors, Nashville has been attracting a lot of capital from out-of-state. A key factor that has been attributed to the increase in investment is the adjustment to the city's zoning code. Developers can easily include a combination of residential, office, retail and entertainment space into their projects. Additionally, the city has invested heavily into public parks. Centennial Park is undergoing extensive renovations. The change in the zoning code and the investment in public space is consistent with the millennial generation's preference for walkable urban neighborhoods.

=== Top employers ===
According to the Nashville Business Journal, the top employers in the city are:

#	Employer	Employees
1	Vanderbilt University Medical Center	28,300
2	State of Tennessee	26,733
3	U.S. federal government	13,707
4	HCA Healthcare	10,600
5	Metropolitan Nashville Public Schools	10,281
6	Vanderbilt University	8,822
7	Metropolitan Government of Nashville and Davidson County	8,700
8	Ascension Saint Thomas	8,335
9	The Kroger Co.	7,813
10	Amazon	5,000
11	Asurion	4,260
12	Bridgestone Americas Inc.	4,110

== Arts and culture ==
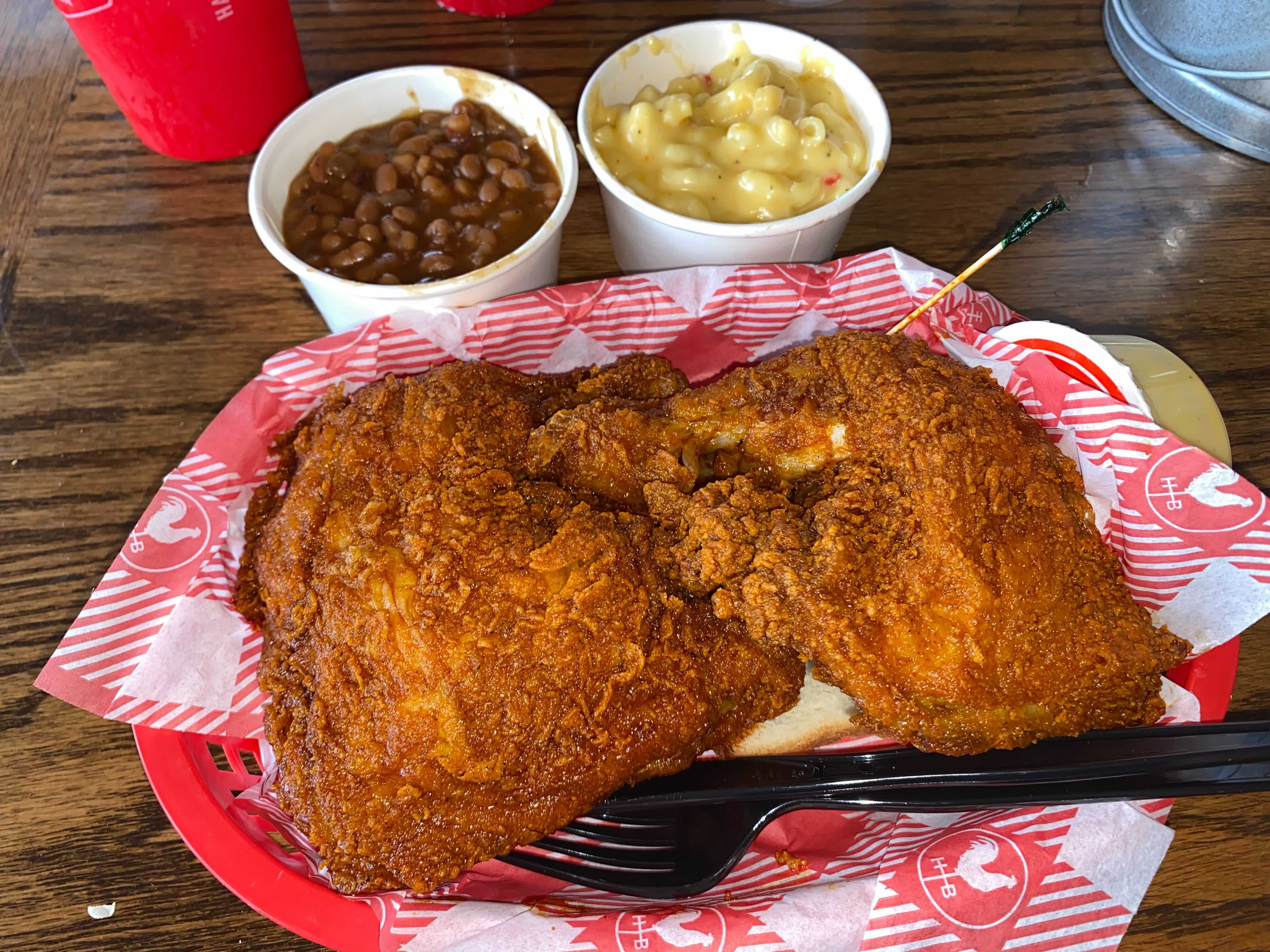
Half-chicken at Hattie B's with side of baked beans and mac and cheese

Much of the city's cultural life has revolved around its large university community. Particularly significant in this respect were two groups of critics and writers who were associated with Vanderbilt University in the early 20th century: the Fugitives and the Agrarians.

Popular destinations include Fort Nashborough and Fort Negley, the former being a reconstruction of the original settlement, the latter being a semi-restored Civil War battle fort; the Tennessee State Museum; and The Parthenon, a full-scale replica of the original Parthenon in Athens. The Tennessee State Capitol is one of the oldest working state capitol buildings in the nation. Both the inside of the capitol and its grounds are adorned by numerous monuments, memorials, and pieces of artwork. The Hermitage, the former home of President Andrew Jackson, is one of the largest presidential homes open to the public, and is also one of the most visited.

Many of the significant sites that reflect the places that shaped Nashville's culture were identified in 2019 and placed in the national database of The Cultural Landscape Foundation, a nonprofit based in Washington, D.C. This list includes the Bicentennial Capital Mall, Public Square, Cheekwood Botanical Gardens and Museum of Art, Clover Bottom Mansion, Belmont Mansion, Travellers Rest Historic House Museum, Mount Olivet and Calvery Cemeteries, Music Row, Printer's Alley Historic District, and the WSM-AM Broadcasting Tower. These and many others are listed on The Cultural Landscape Foundation website.

=== Dining ===
Some of the more popular types of local cuisine include hot chicken, hot fish, barbecue, and meat and three.

=== Entertainment and performing arts ===
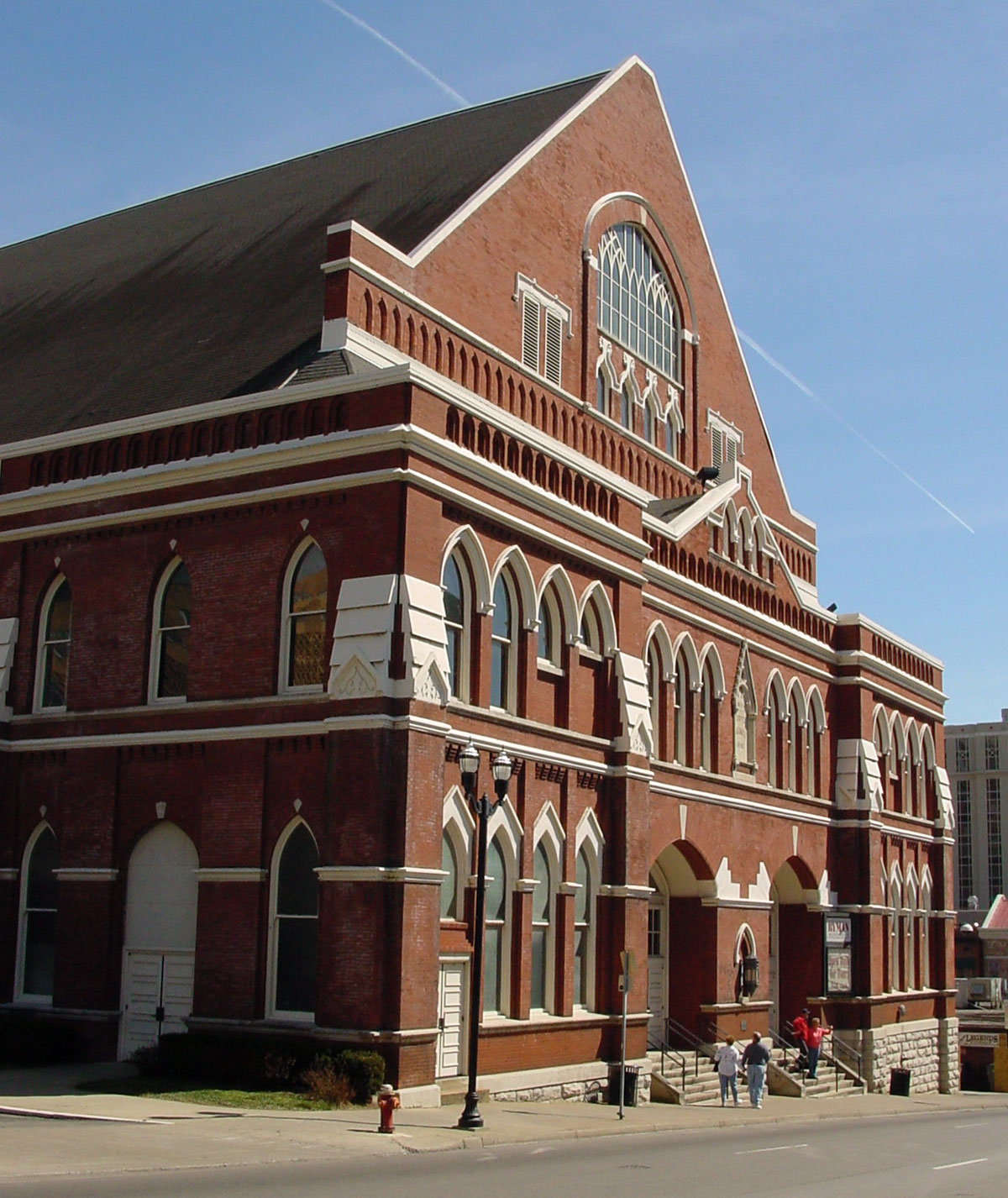
Ryman Auditorium, the "Mother Church of Country Music"

Nashville has a music and entertainment scene spanning a variety of genres. With a long history in the music scene, it is no surprise that the city was nicknamed the "Music City". The Tennessee Performing Arts Center is the major performing arts center of the city. It is the home of the Nashville Repertory Theatre and the Nashville Ballet. In September 2006, the Schermerhorn Symphony Center opened as the home of the Nashville Symphony.

As the city's name itself is a metonym for the country music industry, many popular attractions involve country music, including the Country Music Hall of Fame and Museum, Belcourt Theatre, and Ryman Auditorium. Hence, the city became known as America's "Country Music Capital". The Ryman was home to the Grand Ole Opry until 1974 when the show moved to the Grand Ole Opry House, 9 miles (14 km) east of downtown. The Opry plays there several times a week, except for an annual winter run at the Ryman.

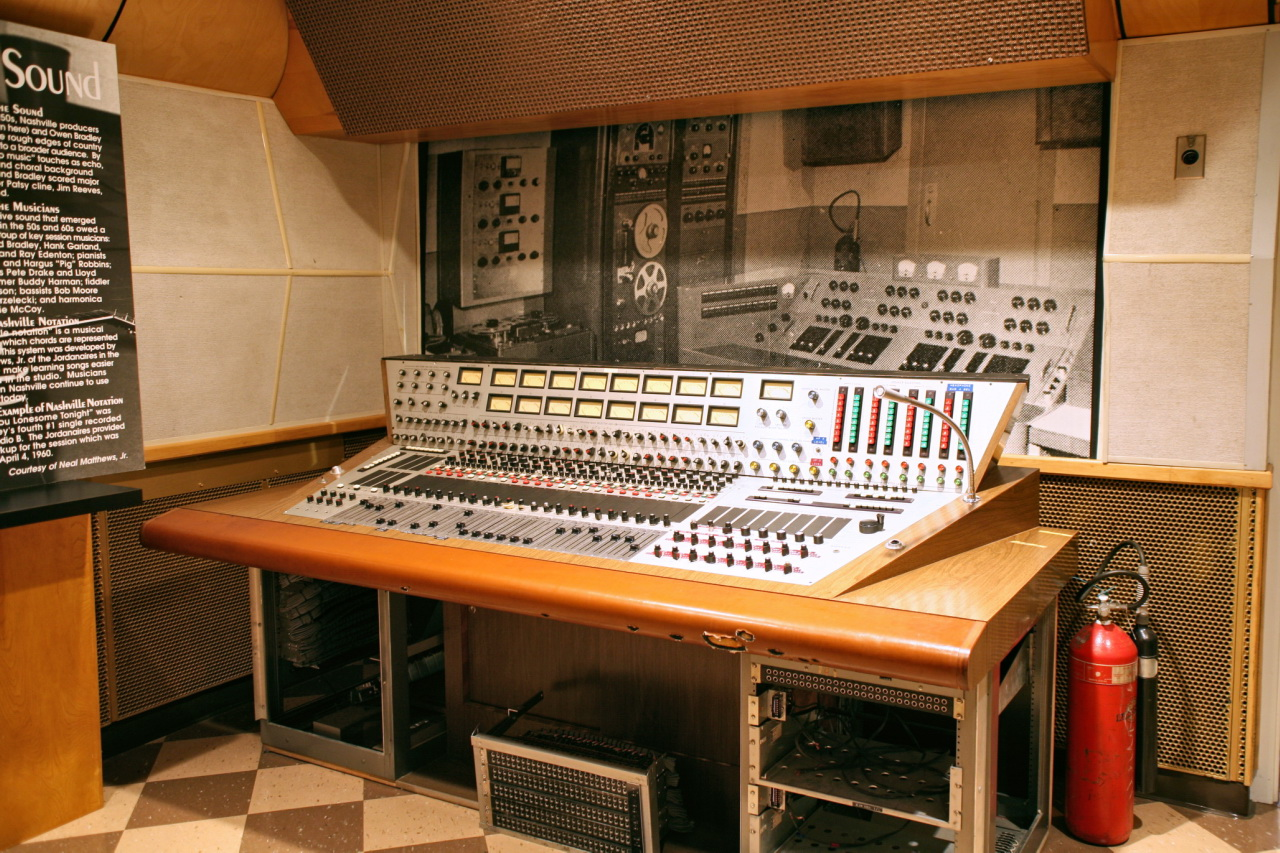
Bill Porter's audio console at RCA Studio B in Nashville. Studio B was the birthplace of the Nashville sound.

Many music clubs and honky-tonk bars are in downtown Nashville, particularly the area encompassing Lower Broadway, Second Avenue, and Printer's Alley, which is often referred to as "the District".

Each June, the CMA Music Festival (formerly known as Fan Fair) brings thousands of country fans to the city. The Tennessee State Fair is also held annually in September.

Nashville was once home of television shows such as Hee Haw and Pop! Goes the Country, as well as The Nashville Network and later, RFD-TV. Country Music Television and Great American Country currently operate from Nashville. The city was also home to the Opryland USA theme park, which operated from 1972 to 1997 before being closed by its owners (Gaylord Entertainment Company) and soon after demolished to make room for the Opry Mills mega-shopping mall.

The Contemporary Christian music industry is based along Nashville's Music Row, with a great influence in neighboring Williamson County. The Christian record companies include EMI Christian Music Group, Provident Label Group, and Word Records.

Music Row houses many gospel music and Contemporary Christian music companies centered around 16th and 17th Avenues South. On River Road, off Charlotte Pike in West Nashville, the CabaRay opened its doors on January 18, 2018. The performing venue of Ray Stevens, it offers a Vegas-style dinner and a show atmosphere. There is also a piano bar and a gift shop.

Although Nashville was never known as a major jazz town, it did have many great jazz bands, including The Nashville Jazz Machine led by Dave Converse and its current version, the Nashville Jazz Orchestra, led by Jim Williamson, as well as The Establishment, led by Billy Adair. The Francis Craig Orchestra entertained Nashvillians from 1929 to 1945 from the Oak Bar and Grille Room in the Hermitage Hotel. Craig's orchestra was also the first to broadcast over local radio station WSM-AM and enjoyed phenomenal success with a 12-year show on the NBC Radio Network. In the late 1930s, he introduced a newcomer, Dinah Shore, a local graduate of Hume Fogg High School and Vanderbilt University.

Radio station WMOT-FM in nearby Murfreesboro, which formerly programmed jazz, aided significantly in the recent revival of the city's jazz scene, as has the non-profit Nashville Jazz Workshop, which holds concerts and classes in a renovated building in the north Nashville neighborhood of Germantown. Fisk University also maintains a jazz station, WFSK.

Nashville has an active theatre scene and is home to several professional and community theatre companies. Nashville Children's Theatre, Nashville Repertory Theatre, the Nashville Shakespeare Festival, the Dance Theatre of Tennessee and the Tennessee Women's Theater Project are among the most prominent professional companies. One community theatre, Circle Players, has been in operation for over 60 years.

The Barbershop Harmony Society has its headquarters in Nashville.

=== Tourism ===
Perhaps the biggest factor in drawing visitors to Nashville is its association with country music, in which the Nashville sound played a role. Many visitors to Nashville attend live performances of the Grand Ole Opry, the world's longest-running live radio show. The Country Music Hall of Fame and Museum is another major attraction relating to the popularity of country music. The Gaylord Opryland Resort & Convention Center, the Opry Mills regional shopping mall and the General Jackson showboat, are all located in what is known as Music Valley.

Civil War history is important to the city's tourism industry. Sites pertaining to the Battle of Nashville and the nearby Battle of Franklin and Battle of Stones River can be seen, along with several well-preserved antebellum plantation houses such as Belle Meade Plantation, Carnton plantation in Franklin, and Belmont Mansion.

Nashville has many arts centers and museums, including the Frist Center for the Visual Arts, Cheekwood Botanical Garden and Museum of Art, the Tennessee State Museum, the Johnny Cash Museum, Fisk University's Van Vechten and Aaron Douglas Galleries, Vanderbilt University's Fine Art Gallery and Sarratt Gallery, the National Museum of African American Music, and the full-scale replica of the Parthenon. A sculpture of Athena Parthenos inside the Parthenon is the tallest indoor sculpture in the Western World – standing 42 feet high.

Nashville has become an increasingly popular destination for bachelor and bachelorette parties. In 2017, Nashville Scene counted 33 bachelorette parties on Lower Broadway ("from Fifth Avenue down to the Cumberland River, it's their town") in less than two hours on a Friday night, and stated that the actual number was likely higher. Downtown, the newspaper wrote, "offers five blocks of bars with live music and no cover". In 2018, The New York Times called Nashville "the hottest destination for bachelorette parties in the country" because of the honky-tonk bars' live music. City boosters welcome the bachelorette parties because temporary visitors may become permanent; BuzzFeed wrote, "These women are at precisely the point in their lives when a move to Nashville is possible". The city in 2022 began regulating party buses that provide transportainment in downtown, issuing dozens of permits and rejecting applications for dozens more. The CMT reality television series Bachelorette Weekend follows the employees at Bach Weekend, a Nashville company that designs and throws bachelor and bachelorette parties.

==== Major annual events ====
Event	Month held and location
Nashville Film Festival	A weeklong festival in April that features hundreds of independent films. It is one of the largest film festivals in the Southern United States.
Nashville Fashion Week	A citywide event typically held in March or April, this is a celebration of Nashville's fashion and retail community featuring local, regional and national design talent in fashion events and shows.
Rock 'n' Roll Nashville Marathon	Marathon, half marathon, and 5k race held in April with runners from around the world. In 2012, participation surpassed 30,000 runners.
Rites of Spring Music Festival	A two-day music festival held every April at Vanderbilt University since 1986. Rites of Spring has welcomed a number of famous artists to the Vanderbilt campus, including Wiz Khalifa, Young the Giant, Drake, Steve Aoki, and the Red Hot Chili Peppers.
Iroquois Steeplechase	Annual steeplechase horse racing event held in May at Percy Warner Park.
CMA Music Festival	A four-day event in June featuring performances by country music stars, autograph signings, artist/fan interaction, and other activities for country music fans.
Nashville Pride	A two-day event held in June that fosters awareness of and for the LGBT community and culture in Middle Tennessee. The 2019 festival drew a record crowd of over 75,000 people, establishing it as the largest LGBT event in Tennessee.
Let Freedom Sing!	Held every Fourth of July at Riverfront Park, featuring a street festival and live music, and culminating in one of the largest fireworks shows in the country. An estimated 280,000 people attended the 2014 celebration.
Tomato Art Festival	Held each August in East Nashville, this event celebrates the Tomato as a Unifier.
African Street Festival	Held in September on the campus of Tennessee State University. It is committed to connecting and celebrating the extensions of Africa to America.
Live on the Green Music Festival	A free concert series held in August and September at Public Square Park by local radio station Lightning 100.
Tennessee State Fair	The State Fair held in September at the State Fairgrounds, which lasts nine days and includes rides, exhibits, rodeos, tractor pulls, and numerous other shows and attractions.
Celebrate Nashville Cultural Festival	A free event held the first Saturday in October at Centennial Park, it is Middle Tennessee's largest multicultural festival and includes music and dance performances, ethnic food court, children's area, teen area, and marketplace.
Art Nashville International Art Fair	An annual Art Fair in downtown Nashville. Includes galleries and dealers from around the world. Open to the public.
Nashville Oktoberfest	A free event held in the historic Germantown neighborhood since 1980 celebrating the culture and customs of Germany. Oktoberfest is Nashville's oldest annual festival and is one of the largest in the South. In 2015, over 143,000 people attended the three-day event which raised $60,000 for Nashville non-profits.
Southern Festival of Books	A festival held in October, featuring readings, panels, and book signings.
Country Music Association Awards	Award ceremony normally held in November at the Bridgestone Arena and televised to a national audience.
Veterans Day Parade	A parade running down Broadway on 11/11 at 11:11.11 am since 1951. Features include 101st Airborne Division (Air Assault), Tennessee National Guard, veterans from wars past and present, military plane fly-overs, tanks, motorcycles, first responder vehicles, marching bands and thousands of spectators.

=== Nicknames ===
Nashville is a well-known city in several different arenas. As such, it has earned various nicknames, including:

- Music City, U.S.A.: WSM-AM announcer David Cobb first used this name during a 1950 broadcast and it stuck. It is now the official nickname used by the Nashville Convention and Visitors Bureau. Nashville is the home of the Grand Ole Opry, the Country Music Hall of Fame, and many major record labels. This name also dates back to 1873, where after receiving and hearing a performance by the Fisk Jubilee Singers, Queen Victoria of the United Kingdom is reported as saying that "These young people must surely come from a musical city."
- Smashville: This moniker is most closely associated with the Nashville Predators hockey team. According to Yahoo! News, the name was conjured by local fan Frank Glinski, "Glinski actually came up with the term "Smashville" during a conversation with the Predators' then-vice president of marketing, who like Glinski had a child playing youth hockey locally." A "Smashville" sign is located outside the home of the Predators, Bridgestone Arena.
- Athens of the South: Home to 24 post-secondary educational institutions, Nashville has long been compared to Athens, the ancient city of learning and site of Plato's Academy. Since 1897, a full-scale replica of the Athenian Parthenon has stood in Nashville, and many examples of classical and neoclassical architecture can be found in the city. The term was popularized by Philip Lindsley (1786–1855), President of the University of Nashville, though it is unclear whether he was the first person to use the phrase.
- The Protestant Vatican or The Buckle of the Bible Belt: Nashville has over 700 churches, several seminaries, a number of Christian music companies, and is the headquarters for the publishing arms of the Southern Baptist Convention (LifeWay Christian Resources), the United Methodist Church (United Methodist Publishing House) and the National Baptist Convention (Sunday School Publishing Board). It is also the seat of the National Baptist Convention, the National Association of Free Will Baptists, the Gideons International, the Gospel Music Association, and Thomas Nelson, the world's largest producer of Bibles.
- Cashville: Nashville native Young Buck released a successful rap album called Straight Outta Cashville that has popularized the nickname among a new generation.
- Little Kurdistan: Nashville has the United States' largest population of Kurdish people, estimated to be around 11,000.
- Nash Vegas or Nashvegas

Nashville has additionally earned the moniker "The Hot Chicken Capital", becoming known for the local specialty cuisine hot chicken. The Music City Hot Chicken Festival is hosted annually in Nashville and several restaurants make this spicy version of southern fried chicken. Due to a short-lived smokeless gunpowder plant in 1918, Nashville also had the nickname "Powder City of the World".

== Sports ==
=== Professional ===
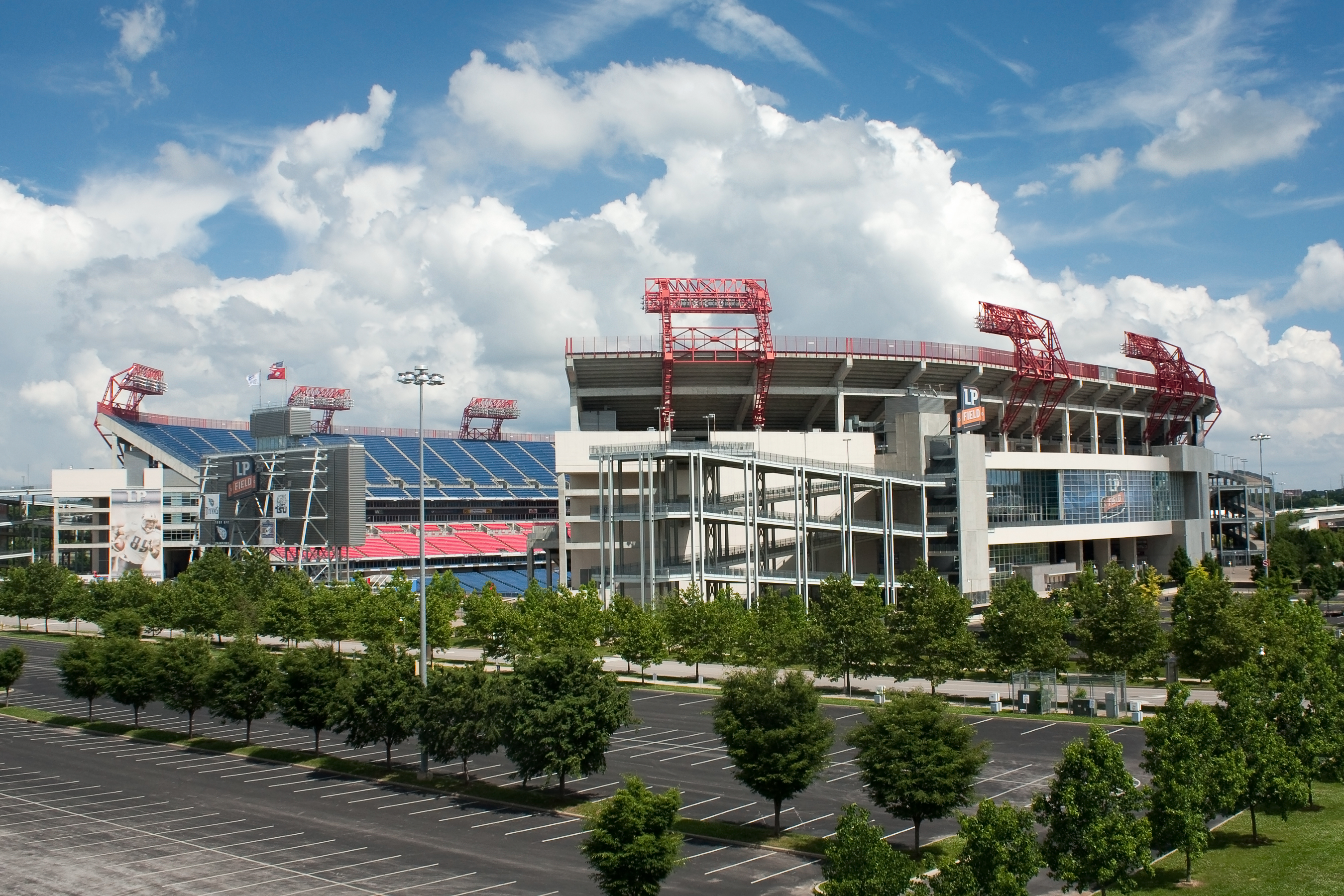
Nissan Stadium, home of the Tennessee Titans and formerly Nashville SC

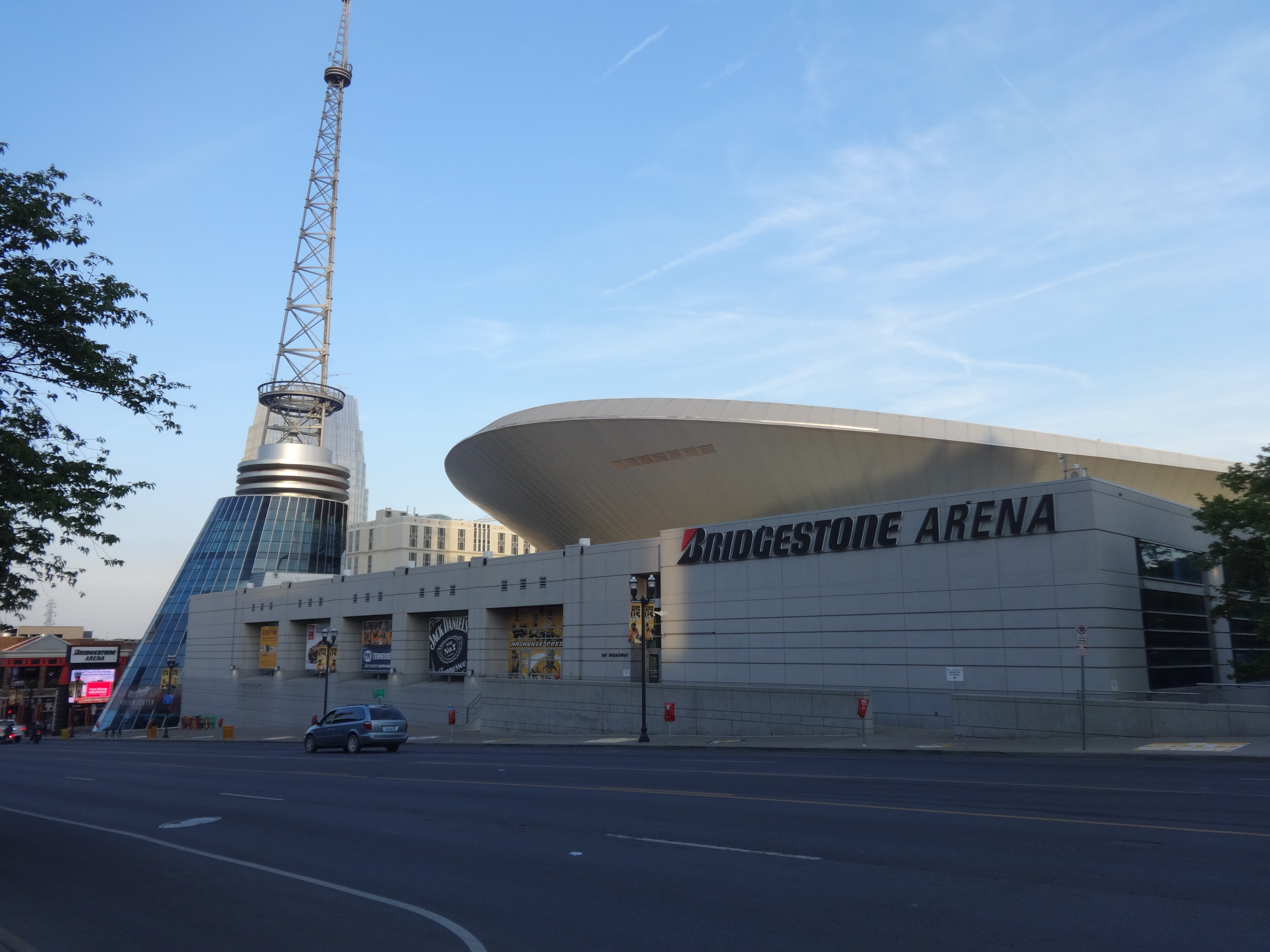
Bridgestone Arena, home of the Nashville Predators

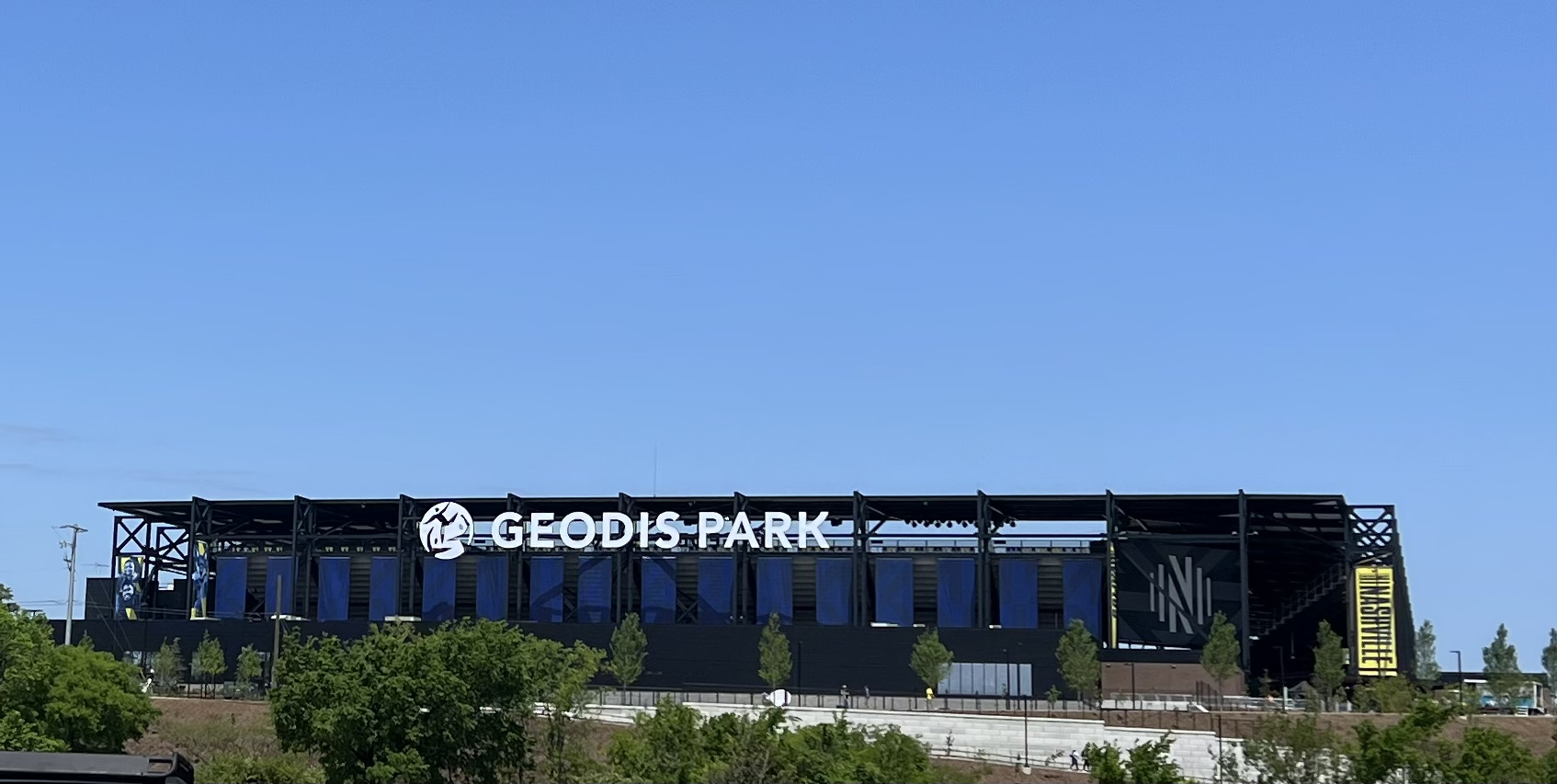
Geodis Park, home of the Nashville SC

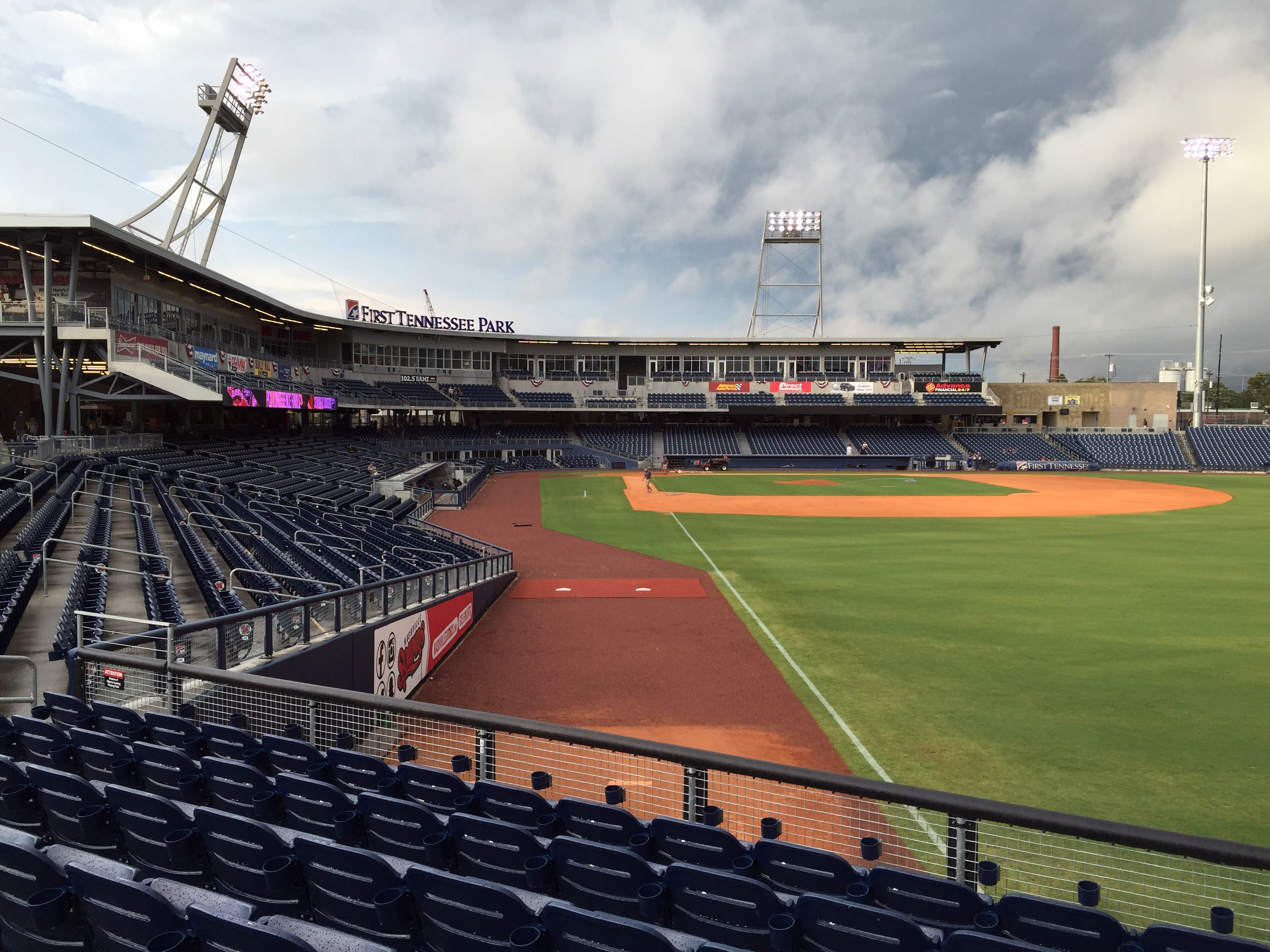
First Horizon Park, home of the Nashville Sounds

Nashville is home to five professional sports franchises. Four play at the highest professional level of their respective sports: the Tennessee Titans of the National Football League (NFL), the Nashville Predators of the National Hockey League (NHL), Nashville SC of Major League Soccer (MLS), and the Nashville Stampede of Professional Bull Riders (PBR). The city is also home to one minor league team: the Nashville Sounds of Minor League Baseball's International League. An investment group, Music City Baseball, seeks to secure a Major League Baseball expansion franchise or lure an existing team to the city. The Women's National Basketball Association rejected a bid for a franchise expansion to Nashville.

Team	Sport	League	Venue	Founded
Tennessee Titans	Football	National Football League	Nissan Stadium	1959/1997
Nashville Predators	Hockey	National Hockey League	Bridgestone Arena	1997
Nashville Sounds	Baseball	International League	First Horizon Park	1978
Nashville SC	Soccer	Major League Soccer	Geodis Park	2020
Nashville Stampede	Bull riding	Professional Bull Riders	Bridgestone Arena	2022

The Tennessee Titans moved to Nashville in 1998. Previously known as the Houston Oilers, which began play in 1960 in Houston, Texas, the team relocated to Tennessee in 1997. They played at the Liberty Bowl Memorial Stadium in Memphis for one season, then moved to Nashville in 1998 and played in Vanderbilt Stadium for one season. During those two years, the team was known as the Tennessee Oilers, but changed its name to Titans in 1999. The team now plays at Nissan Stadium in Nashville, which opened in 1999. Since moving to Nashville, the Titans have won five division championships (2000, 2002, 2008, 2020, and 2021) and one conference championship (1999). They competed in 1999's Super Bowl XXXIV, losing to the St. Louis Rams, 23–16. The city previously hosted the 1939 Nashville Rebels of the American Football League and two Arena Football League teams named the Nashville Kats (1997–2001 and 2005–2007).

From April 25–27, 2019, Nashville hosted the 2019 NFL draft, which saw an estimated 200,000 fans attend each day. Nashville will host Super Bowl LXIV in 2030 at the New Nissan Stadium, marking the first Super Bowl to be held in Nashville.

The Nashville Predators joined the National Hockey League as an expansion team in the 1998–99 season. The team plays its home games at Bridgestone Arena. The Predators have won two division championships (2017–18 and 2018–19) and one conference championship (2016–17).

Nashville SC, a Major League Soccer franchise, began play in 2020 at Nissan Stadium. It moved into the newly completed soccer-specific stadium Geodis Park at the Nashville Fairgrounds in 2022. Geodis Park will host nine Olympic soccer matches during the 2028 Summer Olympics.

The Nashville Sounds baseball team was established in 1978 as an expansion franchise of the Double-A Southern League. The Sounds won the league championship in 1979 and 1982. In 1985, the Double-A Sounds were replaced by a Triple-A team of the American Association. After the circuit dissolved in 1997, they joined the Triple-A Pacific Coast League in 1998 and won the league championship in 2005. The Sounds left their original ballpark, Herschel Greer Stadium, in 2015 for First Horizon Park, a new ballpark built on the site of the former Sulphur Dell ballpark. In 2021, they were placed in the Triple-A East, which became the International League in 2022. In total, the Sounds have won eleven division titles and three league championships.

The Music City Fire, an arena football team of the American Arena League began play at the Williamson County AgExpo Park in 2020.

Nashville is the home of the second-oldest continually operating racetrack in the United States, the Fairgrounds Speedway. It hosted NASCAR Winston Cup races from 1958 to 1984, NASCAR Busch Series and NASCAR Truck Series in the 1980s and 1990s, and later the NASCAR Whelen All-American Series and currently plays host to the ARCA Menards Series East race titled the Music City 150.

Nashville Superspeedway is located 30 mi (48 km) southeast of Nashville in Gladeville, part of the Nashville Metropolitan Statistical Area. The track held NASCAR sanctioned events from 2001 to 2011 as well as IndyCar races from 2001 to 2008. The Superspeedway reopened in 2021 and hosts the premier NASCAR Cup Series' Cracker Barrel 400 and IndyCar Series' Borchetta Bourbon Music City Grand Prix.

The Nashville Invitational was a golf tournament on the PGA Tour from 1944 to 1946. The Sara Lee Classic was part of the LPGA Tour from 1988 to 2002. The BellSouth Senior Classic of the Champions Tour was held from 1994 to 2003. The Nashville Golf Open is part of the Web.com Tour since 2016. The 1961 Women's Western Open and 1980 U.S. Women's Open were also held in Nashville.

=== College and amateur ===
Nashville is also home to four Division I athletic programs. Nashville is also home to the NCAA college football Music City Bowl.

Program	Division	Conference
Vanderbilt Commodores	Division I (FBS)	Southeastern Conference
Tennessee State Tigers	Division I (FCS)	Ohio Valley Conference
Belmont Bruins	Division I (non-football)	Missouri Valley Conference
Lipscomb Bisons	Division I (non-football)	ASUN Conference

Nashville Roller Derby is Nashville's only women's flat track roller derby team. Established in 2006, Nashville Roller Derby competes on a regional and national level. They play their home games at the Nashville Fairgrounds Sports Arena. In 2014, they hosted the WFTDA Championships at Municipal Auditorium.

The Nashville Kangaroos are an Australian Rules Football team that compete in the United States Australian Football League. The Kangaroos play their home games at Elmington Park.

Three Little League Baseball teams from Nashville (one in 1970; one in 2013; and, one in 2014) have qualified for the Little League World Series. Teams from neighboring Goodlettsville qualified for the 2012 and 2016 series, giving the metropolitan area teams in three consecutive years to so qualify; and four teams in five years.

== Parks and recreation ==
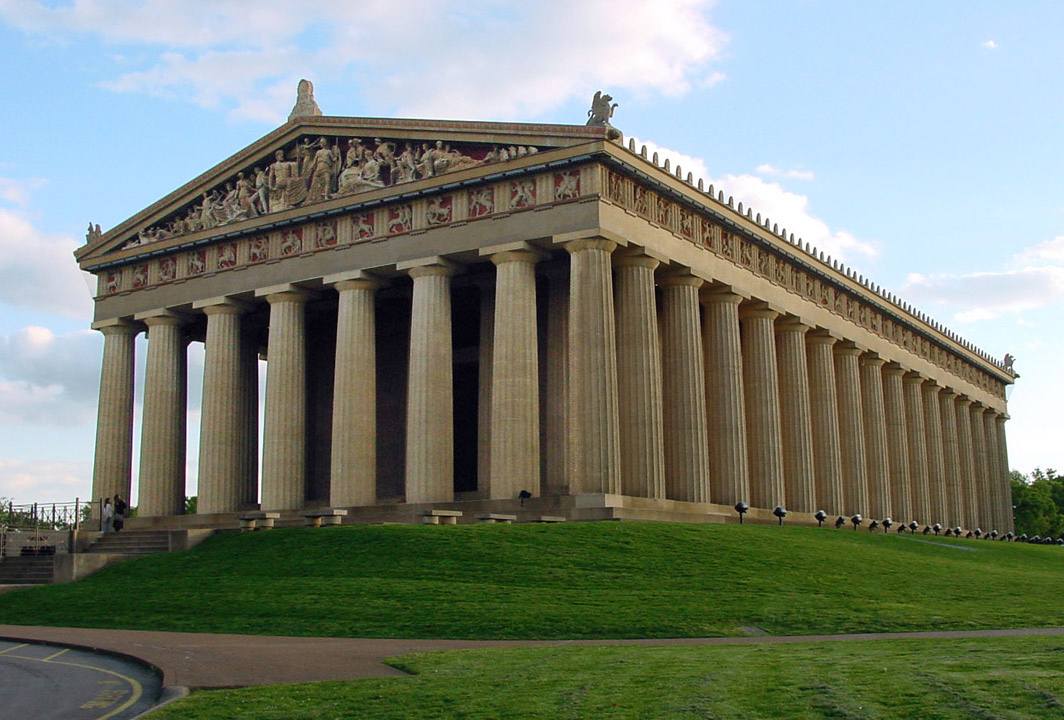
The Parthenon in Nashville's Centennial Park is a full-scale reconstruction of the original Greek Parthenon.

Metro Board of Parks and Recreation owns and manages 10,200 acres (4,100 ha) of land and 99 parks and greenways (accounting for more than 3% of the total area of the county).

Warner Parks, situated on 2,684 acres (1,086 ha) of land, consists of a 5,000-square-foot (460 m^{2}) learning center, 20 miles (32 km) of scenic roads, 12 miles (19 km) of hiking trails, and 10 miles (16 km) of horse trails. It is also the home of the annual Iroquois Steeplechase.

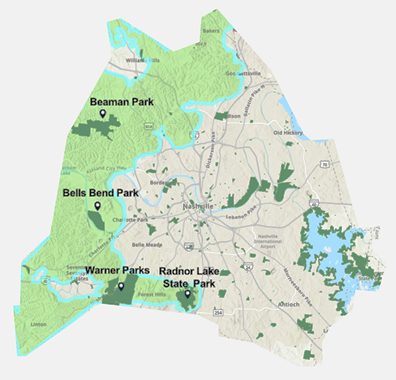
Four parks located within Nashville's Highland Rim Forest

The United States Army Corps of Engineers maintains parks on Old Hickory Lake and Percy Priest Lake. These parks are used for activities such as fishing, water skiing, sailing and boating. The Harbor Island Yacht Club makes its headquarters on Old Hickory Lake, and Percy Priest Lake is home to the Vanderbilt Sailing Club and Nashville Shores.

Other parks in Nashville include Centennial Park, Shelby Park, Cumberland Park, and Radnor Lake State Natural Area. Four of Nashville's major parks are located in a forest of rolling hills along the city's western border. These are Beaman Park, Bells Bend Park, Warner Parks, and Radnor Lake State Park. With urban tree canopy covering 56% of Nashville's total land surface, the city places at the very top in forest cover among major U.S. cities. The vast majority of this canopy is in the suburban western hills containing the four parks noted above. The density and continuous canopy have earned it the name of Nashville's Highland Rim Forest. If omitting towns with smaller populations like Sitka, Alaska, with its huge city park, then Nashville has the largest urban tree canopy of major cities by area. In addition, with Nashville's being one of largest U.S. cities in geographic size at 320,000 acres, its 179,000 acres of forested surface may also rank it first in percentage of canopy cover at 56%.

On August 27, 2013, Nashville mayor Karl Dean revealed plans for two new riverfront parks on the east and west banks of the Cumberland River downtown. Construction on the east bank park began in the fall of 2013, and the projected completion date for the west bank park is 2015. Among many exciting benefits of this Cumberland River re-development project is the construction of a highly anticipated outdoor amphitheater. Located on the west bank, this music venue will be surrounded by a new 12-acre (4.9 ha) park and will replace the previous thermal plant site. It will include room for 6,500 spectators with 2,500 removable seats and additional seating on an overlooking grassy knoll. In addition, the 4.5-acre (1.8 ha) east bank park will include a river landing, providing people access to the river. In regard to the parks' benefits for Nashvillian civilians, Mayor Dean remarked that "if done right, the thermal site can be an iconic park that generations of Nashvillians will be proud of and which they can enjoy".

== Government ==
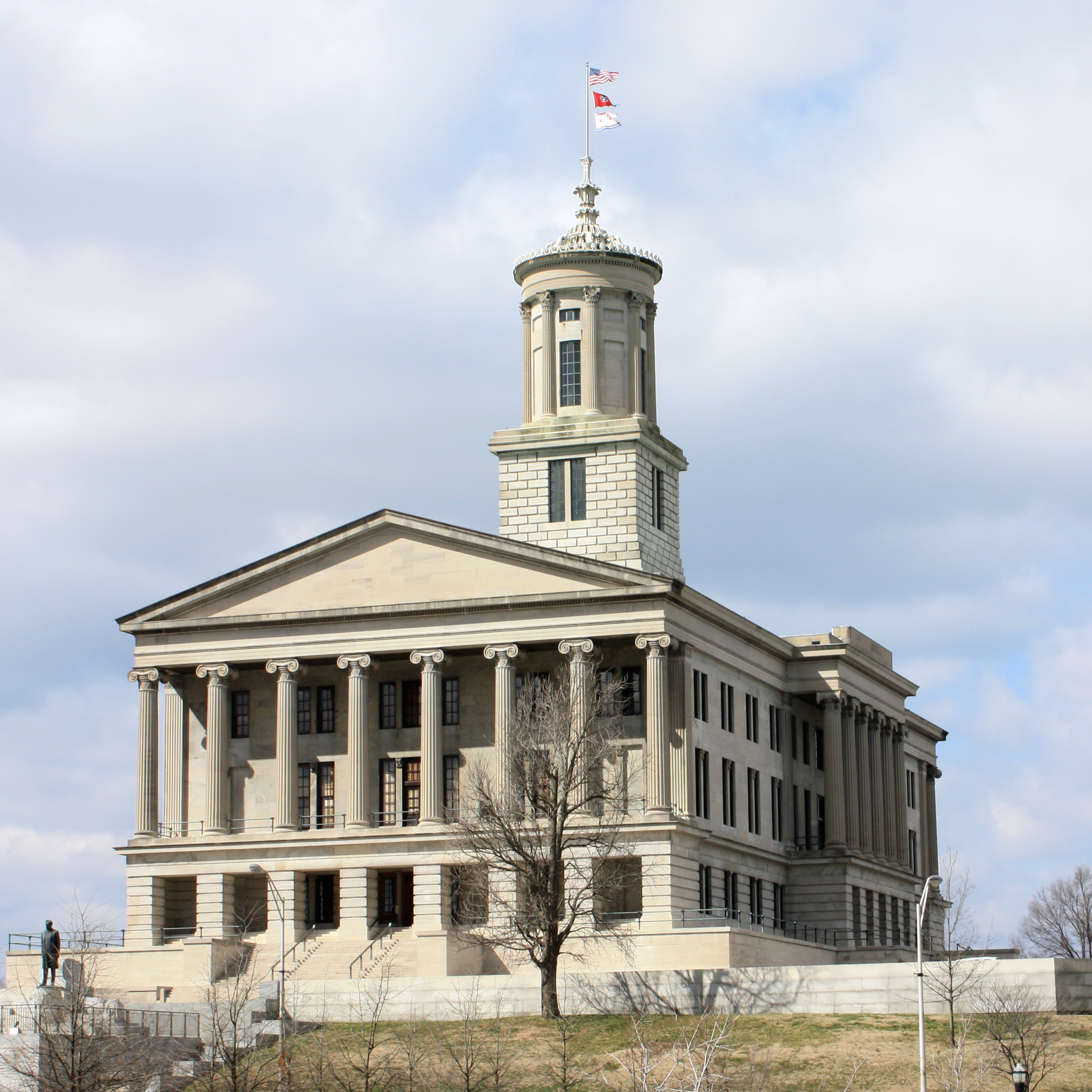
The State Capitol in Nashville

The city of Nashville and Davidson County merged in 1963 as a way for Nashville to combat the problems of urban sprawl. The combined entity is officially known as "the Metropolitan Government of Nashville and Davidson County", and is popularly known as "Metro Nashville" or simply "Metro". It offers services such as police, fire, electricity, water and sewage treatment. When the Metro government was formed in 1963, the government was split into two service districts—the "urban services district" and the "general services district". The urban services district encompasses the 1963 boundaries of the former City of Nashville, approximately 72 square miles (190 km^{2}), and the general services district includes the remainder of Davidson County. There are six smaller municipalities within the consolidated city-county: Belle Meade, Berry Hill, Forest Hills, Oak Hill, Goodlettsville (partially), and Ridgetop (partially). These municipalities use a two-tier system of government, with the smaller municipality typically providing police services and the Metro Nashville government providing most other services. Previously, the city of Lakewood also had a separate charter. However, Lakewood residents voted in 2010 and 2011 to dissolve its city charter and join the metropolitan government, with both votes passing.

Nashville is governed by a mayor, vice-mayor, and 40-member Metropolitan Council. It uses the strong-mayor form of the mayor–council system. The current mayor of Nashville is Freddie O'Connell. The Metropolitan Council is the legislative body of government for Nashville and Davidson County. There are five council members who are elected at large and 35 council members that represent individual districts. The Metro Council has regular meetings that are presided over by the vice-mayor, who is currently Jim Shulman. The Metro Council meets on the first and third Tuesday of each month at 6:00 pm, according to the Metropolitan Charter.

Nashville is home to the Tennessee Supreme Court's courthouse for Middle Tennessee and the Estes Kefauver Federal Building and United States Courthouse, home of the United States District Court for the Middle District of Tennessee.

=== Politics ===
Nashville has been a Democratic stronghold since at least the end of Reconstruction, and has remained staunchly Democratic even as the state as a whole has trended strongly Republican. Pockets of Republican influence exist in the wealthier portions of the city, but they are usually no match for the overwhelming Democratic trend in the rest of the city. The issue of school busing roiled politics for years but subsided after the 1990s. While local elections are officially nonpartisan, nearly all the city's elected officials are publicly known as Democrats. The city is split among 10 state house districts, all of which are held by Democrats. Three state senate districts and part of a fourth are within the county; three are held by Democrats and one by a Republican.

In the state legislature, Nashville politicians serve as leaders of both the Senate and House Democratic Caucuses. In 2024, Representative John Ray Clemmons was voted to serve as the Chairman of the House Democratic Caucus.

Democrats are no less dominant at the federal level. Democratic presidential candidates have failed to carry Davidson County only five times since Reconstruction; in 1928, 1968, 1972, 1984 and 1988. In most years, Democrats have carried Nashville at the presidential level with relatively little difficulty, even in years when they lose Tennessee as a whole. This has been especially true in recent elections, as the state capitol has continued to trend more Democratic even as most of the rest of the state has become staunchly Republican. In the 2000 presidential election, Tennessean Democrat Al Gore carried Nashville with over 59% of the vote even as he narrowly lost his home state and thus the presidency. In the 2004 election, Democrat John Kerry carried Nashville with 55% of the vote while George W. Bush won the state by 14 points. In 2008, Barack Obama carried Nashville with 60% of the vote while Republican John McCain won Tennessee by 15 points.

Nashville was in a single congressional district, the 5th, for most of its history. A Republican had not represented a significant portion of Nashville since 1874, until 2022 when the GOP-controlled state legislature controversially split Nashville into parts of the 5th, 6th, and 7th districts in a partisan gerrymander an additional Republican to Tennessee's congressional delegation as part of the 2022 redistricting cycle. This Republican gerrymander 'cracked' the Democratic stronghold of Nashville across three otherwise Republican districts, ensuring three Republican representatives. This gerrymander 'diminished the influence of Black voters and other voters of color concentrated in Nashville', by splitting them up and adding portions of the Nashville community into districts that are overwhelmingly white and Republican, thus diluting the voting power of Black voters in the state.

Prior to this gerrymander, Republicans made a few spirited challenges to the 5th district in the mid-1960s and early 1970s, almost winning the district in 1968. The last serious bid for the district while still a Democratic stronghold was in 1972, when the Republican candidate gained 38% of the vote even as Nixon carried the district in the presidential election by a large margin. The district's best-known congressman was probably Jo Byrns, who represented the district from 1909 to 1936 and was Speaker of the House for much of Franklin Roosevelt's first term as president. Another nationally prominent congressman from Nashville was Percy Priest, who represented the district from 1941 to 1956 and was House Majority Whip from 1949 to 1953. Former mayors Richard Fulton and Bill Boner also sat in the U.S. House before assuming the Metro mayoral office.

From 2003 to 2013, a sliver of southwestern Nashville was located in the 7th District, represented by Republican Marsha Blackburn. This area was roughly coextensive with the portion of Nashville she had represented in the state senate from 1998 to 2002. However, the 5th regained all of Nashville after the 2010 census.

== Education ==
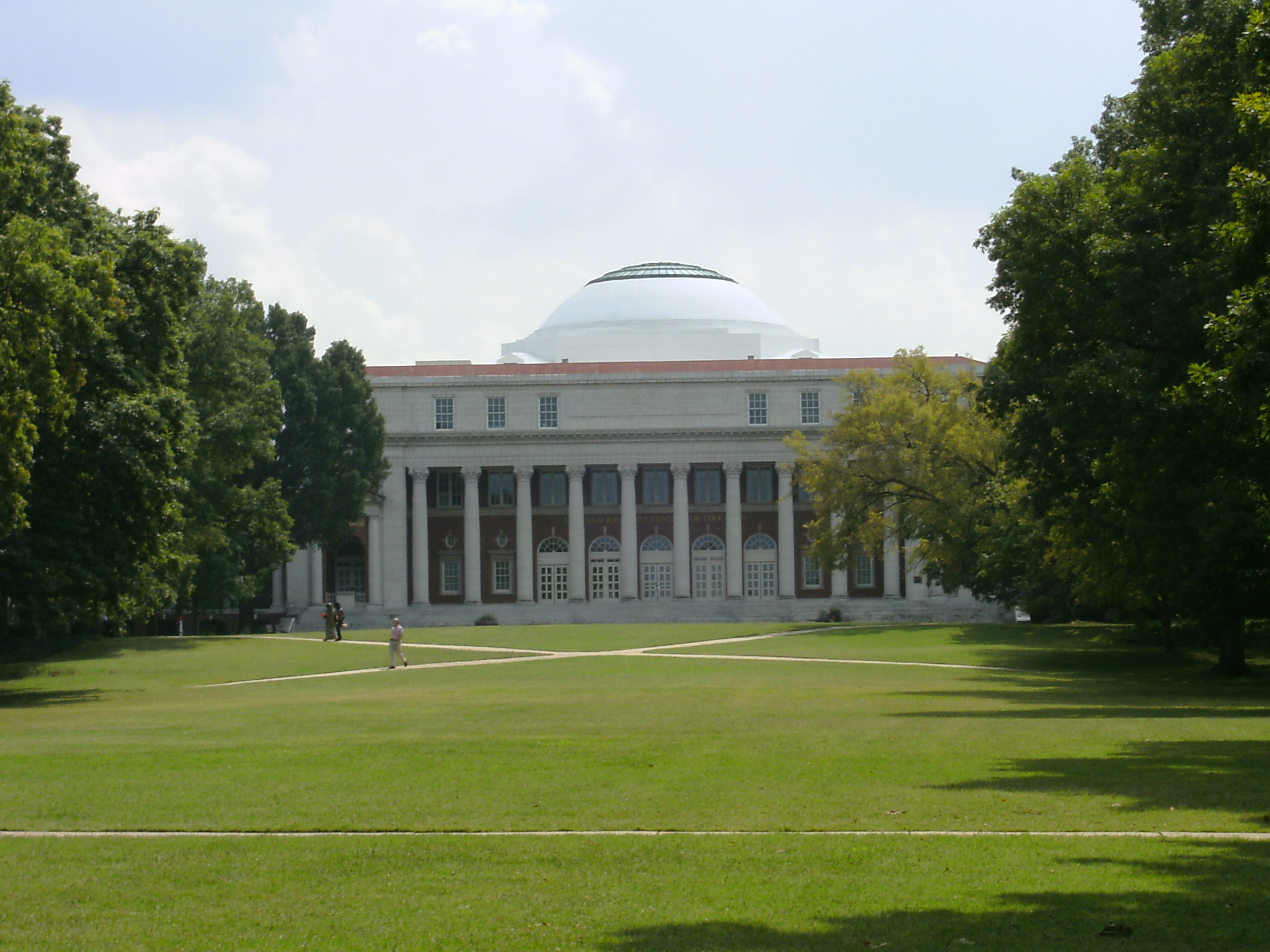
Wyatt Center, Vanderbilt University

By the 1850s, Nashville earned the nickname "Athens of the South" by becoming the first southern city to establish a public school system. Today, the city is served by Metropolitan Nashville Public Schools, also referred to as Metro Schools. This district is the second-largest school district in Tennessee, and enrolls approximately 85,000 students at 169 schools. In addition, Nashville is home to numerous private schools, including Montgomery Bell Academy, Harpeth Hall School, University School of Nashville, Lipscomb Academy, The Ensworth School, Christ Presbyterian Academy, Father Ryan High School, Pope John Paul II High School, Franklin Road Academy, Davidson Academy, Nashville Christian School, Donelson Christian Academy, and St. Cecilia Academy. Combined, all of the private schools in Nashville enroll more than 15,000 students.

=== Colleges and universities ===
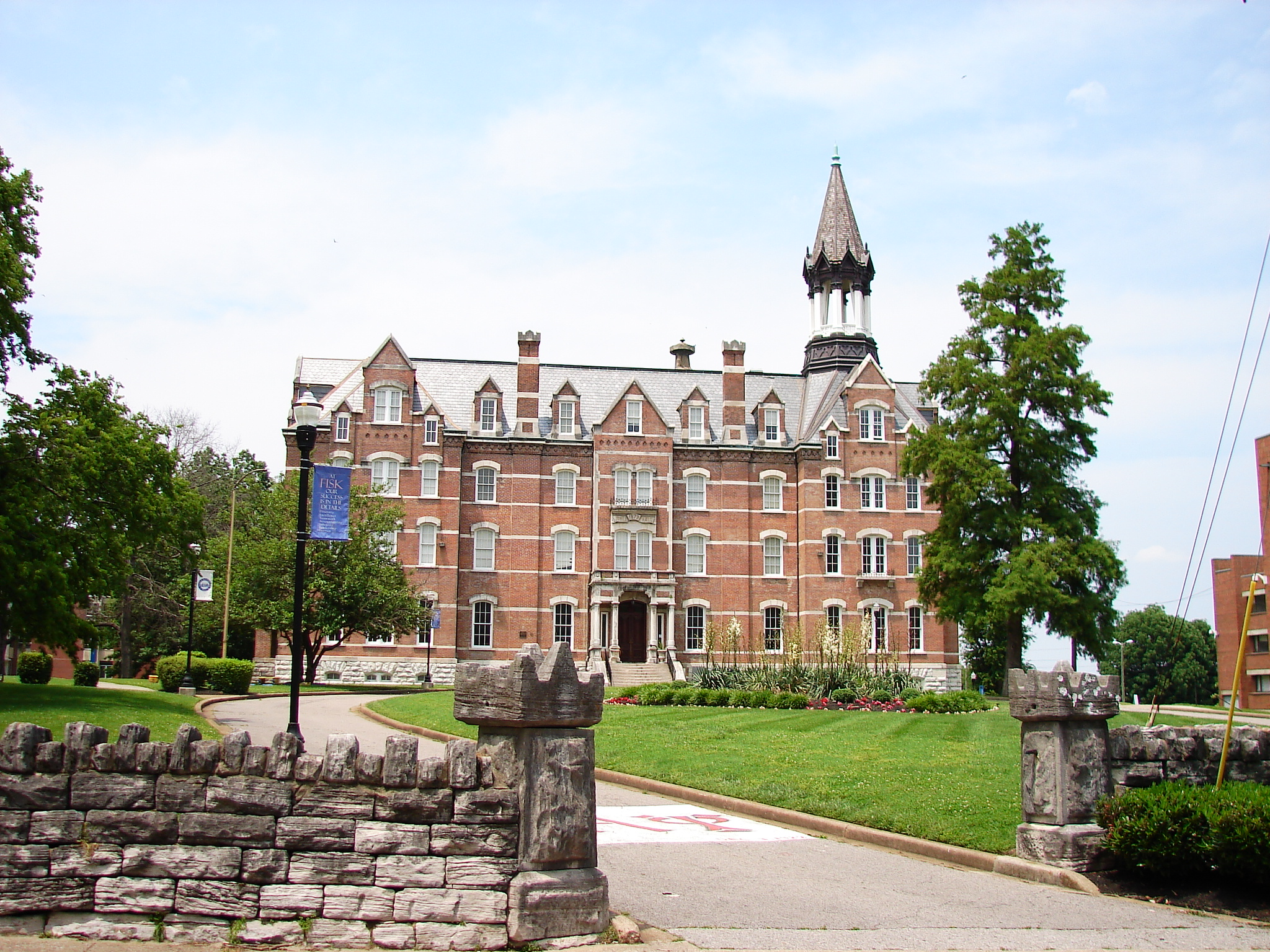
Jubilee Hall, Fisk University

The label, the "Athens of the South," was ossified in the later half of the 19th century due Nashville's high concentration of colleges and universities in the metropolitan area. Today, the total enrollment in post-secondary education in Nashville is around 43,000.

The largest is Vanderbilt University, with about 13,000 students. Vanderbilt is considered one of the nation's leading research universities and is particularly known for its medical, law, business, engineering, and education programs.

Nashville is home to more historically Black institutions of higher education than any other city save for Atlanta, Georgia: Fisk University, Tennessee State University, Meharry Medical College, and American Baptist College.

Other schools based in Nashville include Belmont University, Lipscomb University, Trevecca Nazarene University, and John A. Gupton College. The Tennessee Board of Regents operates Nashville State Community College and the Nashville branch of the Tennessee Colleges of Applied Technology.

Other nearby institutes of higher education include Murfreesboro's Middle Tennessee State University (MTSU) and Clarksville's Austin Peay University, both full-sized public university with Tennessee's second- and eighth-largest undergraduate populations, respectively; Daymar College in Franklin; and Cumberland University in Lebanon.

== Media ==
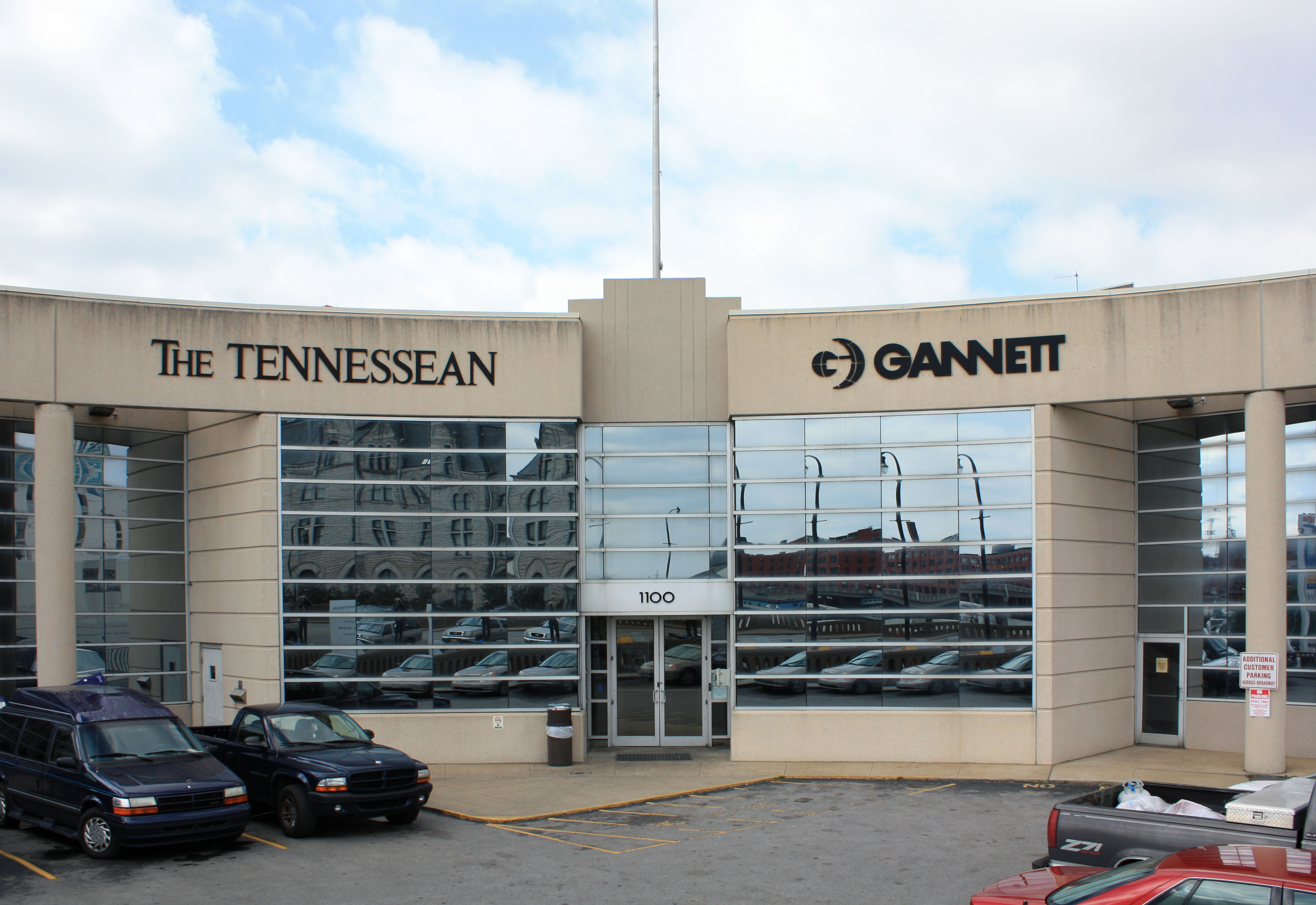
Former offices of The Tennessean

The daily newspaper in Nashville is The Tennessean, which until 1998 competed with the Nashville Banner, another daily paper that was housed in the same building under a joint-operating agreement. The Tennessean is the city's most widely circulated newspaper. Online news service NashvillePost.com competes with the printed dailies to break local and state news. Several weekly papers are also published in Nashville, including The Nashville Pride, Nashville Business Journal, Nashville Scene and The Tennessee Tribune. Historically, The Tennessean was associated with a broadly liberal editorial policy, while The Banner carried staunchly conservative views in its editorial pages; The Banner's heritage had been carried on, to an extent, by The City Paper which folded in August 2013 after having been founded in October 2000. The Nashville Scene is the area's alternative weekly broadsheet. The Nashville Pride is aimed towards community development and serves Nashville's entrepreneurial population. Nashville Post is an online news source covering business, politics and sports.

Nashville is home to eleven broadcast television stations, although most households are served by direct cable network connections. Comcast Cable has a monopoly on terrestrial cable service in Davidson County (but not throughout the entire media market). Nashville is ranked as the 26th largest television market in the United States. Major stations include WKRN-TV 2 (ABC), WSMV-TV 4 (NBC), WTVF 5 (CBS, with Ion on DT2), WNPT 8 (PBS), WTNX-LD 15 (Telemundo), WZTV 17 (Fox, with The CW on DT2), WNPX-TV 28 (Independent), WPGD-TV 50 (TBN), WLLC-LD 42 (Univision), WUXP-TV 30 (MyNetworkTV), (WJFB) 44 (MeTV), and WNAB 58 (Dabl).

Nashville is also home to cable networks Country Music Television (CMT) and RFD-TV, among others. CMT's master control facilities are located in New York City with other Viacom properties. The Top 20 Countdown and CMT Insider are taped in their Nashville studios. Shop at Home Network was once based in Nashville, but the channel signed off in 2008.

Several FM and AM radio stations broadcast in the Nashville area, including five college stations and one LPFM community radio station. Nashville is ranked as the 39th largest radio market in the United States. WSM-FM is owned by Cumulus Media and is 95.5 FM. WSM-AM, owned by Gaylord Entertainment Company, is based on the Gaylord Opryland Resort & Convention Center. WSM is famous for carrying live broadcasts of the Grand Ole Opry, through which it helped spread the popularity of country music in America, and continues to broadcast country music throughout its broadcast day. WLAC, whose over-the-air signal is heard at 1510 AM, is an iHeartMedia-owned talk station which was originally sponsored by the Life and Casualty Insurance Company of Tennessee, and its competitor WWTN is owned by Cumulus.

Several major motion pictures have been filmed in Nashville, including The Green Mile, The Matrix, The Last Castle, Gummo, Starman, The Thing Called Love, Two Weeks, Coal Miner's Daughter, Nashville, and Country Strong, as well as the ABC television series Nashville and another upcoming ABC television series 9-1-1: Nashville.

== Infrastructure ==
=== Transportation ===
According to the 2016 American Community Survey, 78.1% of working Nashville residents commuted by driving alone, 9.8% carpooled, 2% used public transportation, and 2.2% walked. About 1.1% used all other forms of transportation, including taxicab, motorcycle, and bicycle. About 6.7% of working Nashville residents worked at home. In 2015, 7.9% of city of Nashville households were without a car; this figure decreased to 5.9% in 2016. The national average was 8.7 percent in 2016. Nashville averaged 1.72 cars per household in 2016, compared to a national average of 1.8 per household.

==== Highways ====
Nashville is centrally located at the crossroads of three Interstate Highways, I-40 (east-west), I-24 (northwest-southeast) and I-65 (north-south). I-40 connects the city between Memphis to the west and Knoxville to the east, I-24 connects between Clarksville to the northwest and Chattanooga to the southeast, and I-65 connects between Louisville to the north and Huntsville to the south. All three of these Interstate Highways, which also serve the suburbs, form brief concurrencies with each other in the city, and completely encircle downtown. I-440 is a bypass route connecting I-40, I-65, and I-24 south of Downtown Nashville. Briley Parkway, the majority of which is a freeway, forms a bypass around the north side of the city and its Interstates. Ellington Parkway, a freeway made up of a section of US 31E, runs between east of downtown and Briley Parkway, serving as an alternative route to I-65. I-840 provides an outer southern bypass for the city and its suburbs. U.S. Routes that serve Nashville are US 31, 31E, 31W, 31A, 41, 41A, 70, 70S, and 431, all intersecting in the city's center as arterial surface roads and radiating outward. Most of these routes are called "pikes" and many carry the names of nearby towns to which they lead. Among these are Clarksville Pike, Gallatin Pike, Lebanon Pike, Murfreesboro Pike, Nolensville Pike, and Franklin Pike.

==== Public transit ====
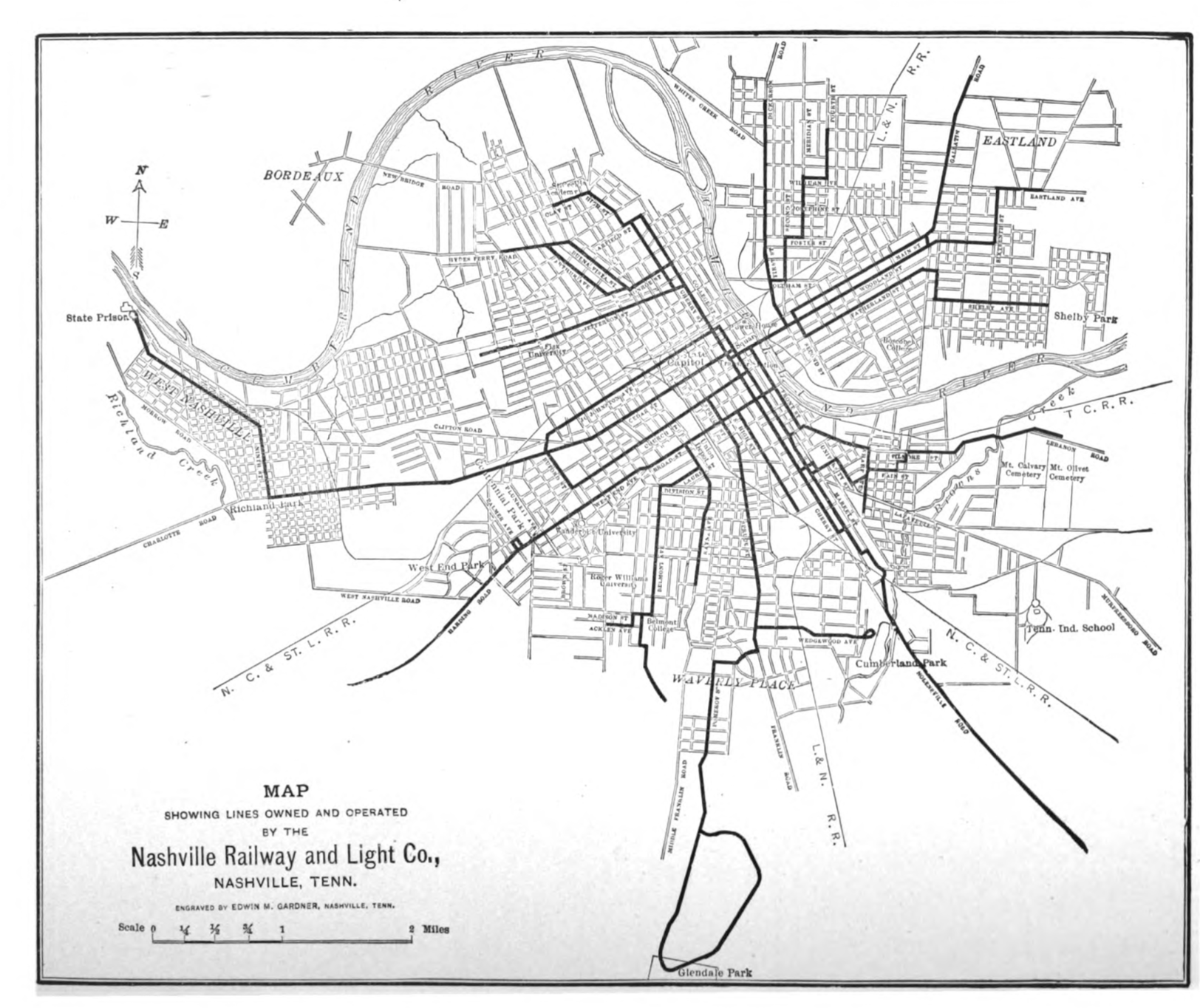
Map showing Lines Owned and Operated by the Nashville Railway and Light Company c. 1907

WeGo Public Transit provides bus transit within the city. Routes utilize a hub and spoke method, centered around the Music City Central transit station in downtown. A 2018 expansion plan that included use of bus rapid transit and light rail service was rejected by voters. A subsequent expansion plan focused on improving sidewalks, adding smart signals, upgrading bus stops and transit centers, implementing a 24-hour bus service and adding 54 miles of high-capacity transit corridors was passed in 2024.

Nashville is considered a gateway city for rail and air traffic for the Piedmont Atlantic Megaregion.

==== Air ====
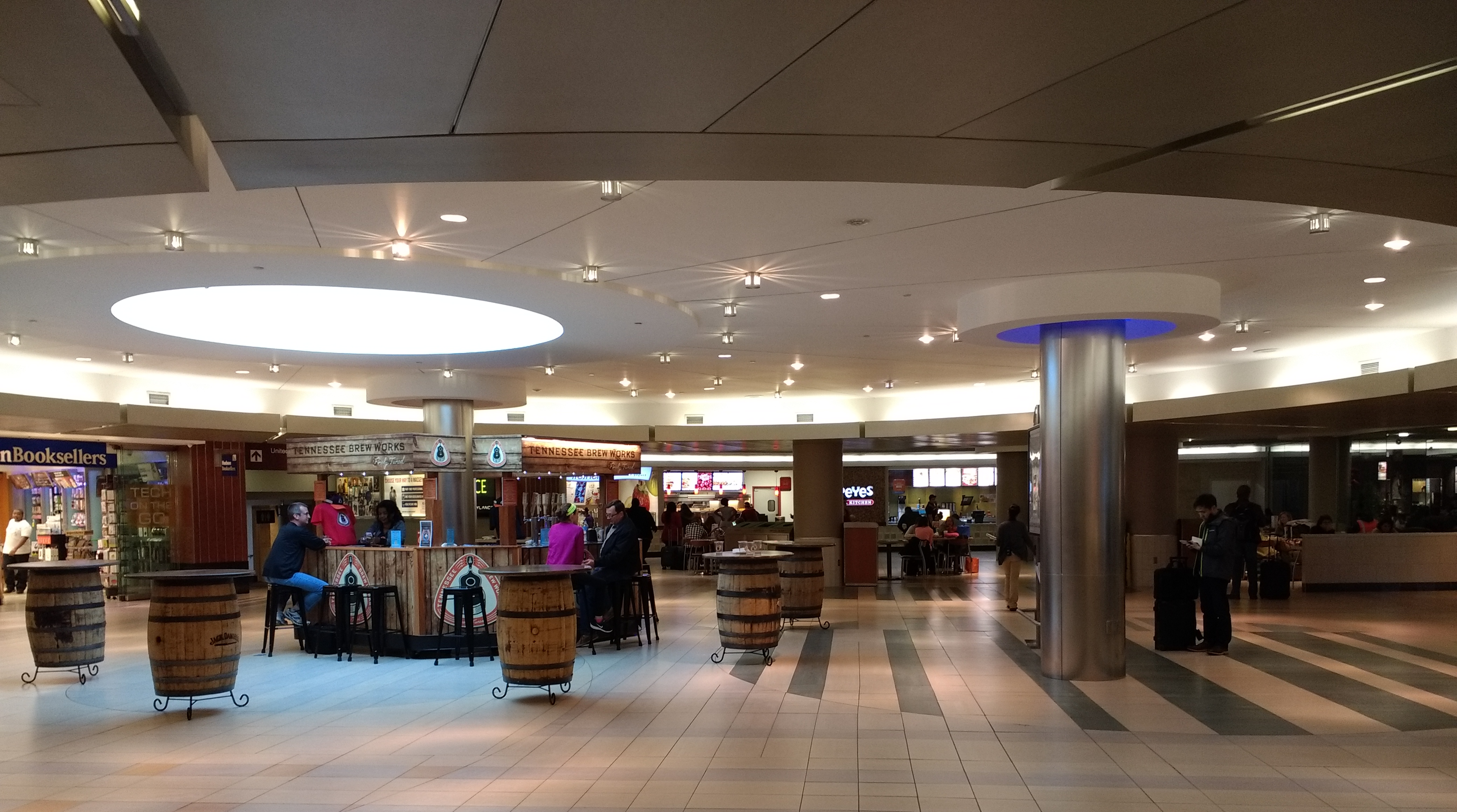
Interior of the terminal at the Nashville International Airport

The city is served by Nashville International Airport (BNA), which is operated by the Metropolitan Nashville Airport Authority (MNAA). Nearly 23 million passengers visited the airport in 2023, making it the 29th busiest airport in the US. BNA is ranked the fastest growing airport among the top 50 airports in the United States. Nashville International Airport serves 600 daily flights to more than 100 nonstop markets.

In late 2014, BNA became the first major U.S. airport to establish dedicated pick-up and drop-off areas for vehicle for hire companies.

The airport authority also operates the John C. Tune Airport, a Class E airspace general aviation airport.

On September 11, 2026, the Nashville Airport Authority unanimously approved to rename the airport Dolly Parton International Airport.

==== Intercity rail ====
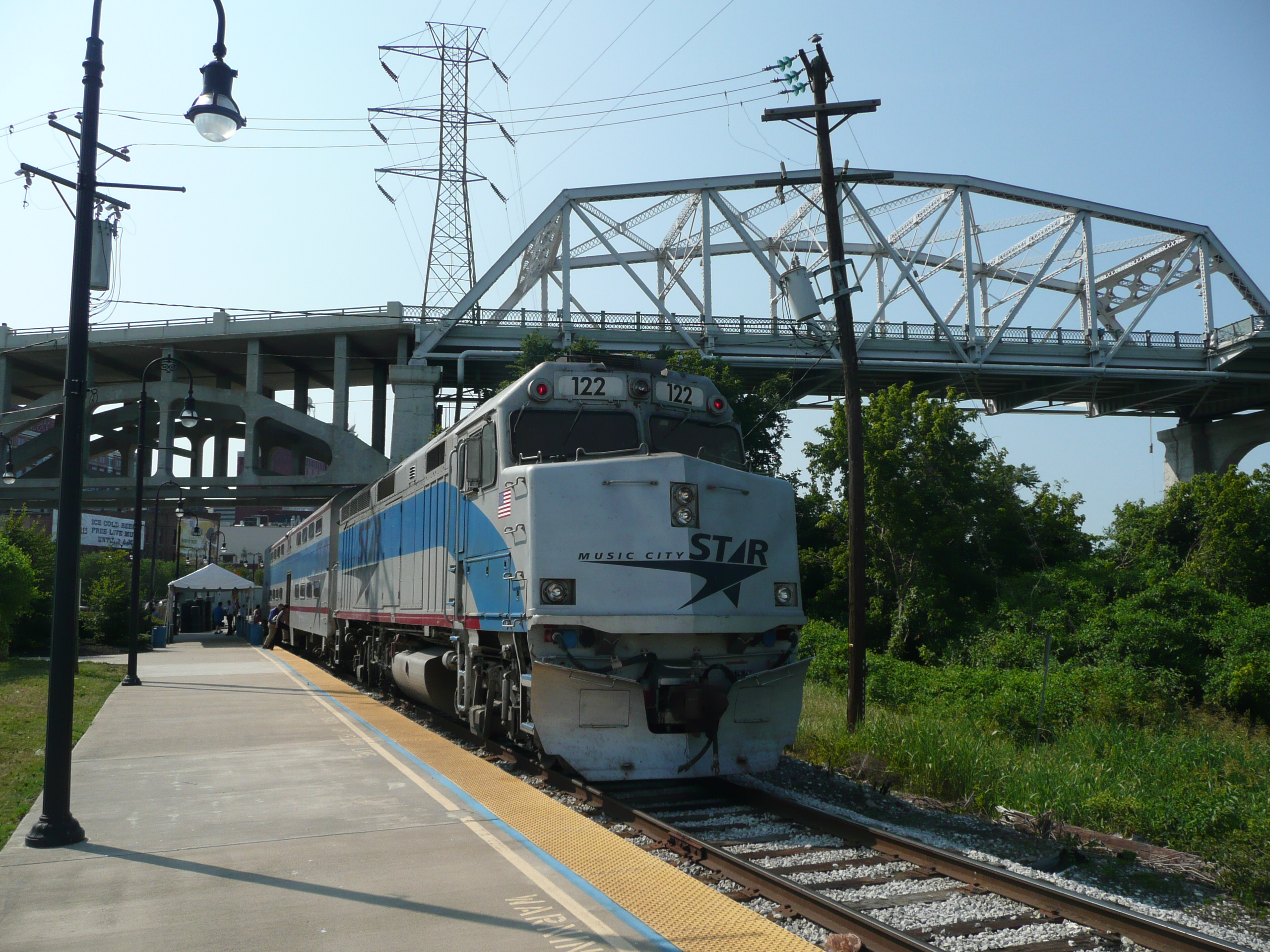
A WeGo Star commuter train beneath the Shelby Street Bridge

Although a major freight hub for CSX Transportation, Nashville is not currently served by Amtrak, the third-largest metropolitan area in the U.S. to have this distinction. Nashville's Union Station had once been a major intercity passenger rail center for the Louisville and Nashville Railroad; Nashville, Chattanooga and St. Louis Railway; and the Tennessee Central Railway, reaching Midwestern cities and cities on the Gulf of Mexico and the Atlantic Ocean. However, by the time of Amtrak's founding, service had been cut back to a single train, the Floridian, which ran from Chicago to Miami and St. Petersburg, Florida. It served Union Station until its cancellation on October 9, 1979, due to poor track conditions resulting in late trains and low ridership, ending over 120 years of intercity rail service in Nashville.

While there have been few proposals to restore Amtrak service to Nashville, there have been repeated calls from residents. In addition to scarce federal funding, Tennessee state officials do not believe that Nashville is large enough to support intercity rail. "It would be wonderful to say I can be in Memphis and jump on a train to Nashville, but the volume of people who would do that isn't anywhere close to what the cost would be to provide the service," said Ed Cole, chief of environment and planning with the Tennessee Department of Transportation. Ross Capon, executive director of the National Association of Railroad Passengers, said rail trips would catch on if routes were expanded, but conceded that it would be nearly impossible to resume Amtrak service to Nashville without a substantial investment from the state. However, in 2020, Amtrak indicated it was considering a service that would run from Atlanta to Nashville by way of Chattanooga.

Nashville launched a passenger commuter rail system called the Music City Star (now the WeGo Star) on September 18, 2006. The only currently operational leg of the system connects the city of Lebanon to downtown Nashville at the Nashville Riverfront station. Legs to Clarksville, Murfreesboro and Gallatin are currently in the feasibility study stage. The system plan includes seven legs connecting Nashville to surrounding suburbs.

==== Bridges ====
Bridges within the city include:

Official name	Other names	Length	Date opened	Notes
Korean War Veterans Memorial Bridge	Gateway Bridge	1,660 ft (510 m)	May 19, 2004	
Kelly Miller Smith Memorial Bridge	Jefferson Street Bridge	1,835 ft (559 m)	March 2, 1994	
Old Hickory Bridge		1,222 ft (372 m)	1928; second span built 1967	
Martin Luther King Jr. Bridge	Bordeaux Bridge		September 18, 1980	
John Seigenthaler Pedestrian Bridge	Shelby Street Bridge	3,150 ft (960 m)	July 5, 1909	
Silliman Evans Bridge		2,362 ft (720 m)	January 14, 1964	
Lyle H. Fulton Memorial Bridge			March 15, 1971	
Victory Memorial Bridge			May 19, 1956	
William Goodwin Bridge	Hobson Pike Bridge	2,215 ft (675 m)		
Woodland Street Bridge		639 ft (195 m)	April 10, 1886; replaced 1965	

=== Utilities ===
The city of Nashville owns the Nashville Electric Service (NES), Metro Water Services (MWS) and Nashville District Energy System (NDES). The Nashville Electric Service provides electricity to the entirety of Davidson County and small portions of the six adjacent counties, and purchases its power from the Tennessee Valley Authority. Metro Water Services provides water, wastewater, and stormwater to Nashville and the majority of Davidson County, as well as water services to small portions of Rutherford and Williamson counties, and wastewater services to small portions of all of the surrounding counties except for Cheatham County. MWS sources its water from the Cumberland River and operates two water treatment plants and three wastewater treatment plants. Ten additional utility companies provide water and sewer service to Nashville and Davidson County. The Nashville District Energy System provides heating and cooling services to certain buildings in downtown, including multiple government buildings. Natural gas is provided by Piedmont Natural Gas, a subsidiary of Duke Energy.

=== Healthcare ===
As a major center for the healthcare industry, Nashville is home to several hospitals and other primary care facilities. Most hospitals in Nashville are operated by Vanderbilt University Medical Center, the TriStar Division of Hospital Corporation of America, and Ascension Saint Thomas. The Metropolitan Nashville Hospital Authority operates Nashville General Hospital, which is affiliated with Meharry Medical College.

== Sister cities ==
Nashville's sister cities are:

- Belfast, Northern Ireland, United Kingdom
- Caen, France
- Chengdu, China
- Edmonton, Canada
- Erbil, Kurdistan Region, Iraq
- Huế, Vietnam
- Kamakura, Japan
- Magdeburg, Germany
- Mendoza, Argentina
- Taiyuan, China
- Tamworth, Australia

Candidates

- Gwangjin (Seoul), South Korea

International Friendship City

- Crouy, France

Municipality United in Friendship

- El Port de la Selva, Spain

== Consulates ==
Nashville is also home to consulates for the following countries:

- Denmark
- El Salvador
- Germany (honorary)
- Guatemala
- Ireland (honorary)
- Italy
- Japan

== See also ==
- List of people from Nashville, Tennessee
- Metropolitan Development and Housing Agency
- The Children, 1999 book about the Nashville Student Movement
- National Register of Historic Places listings in Davidson County, Tennessee
- USS Nashville, 3 ships

== Bibliography ==
- Barnes, Melville Marshall (1974) [1st pub. Foster & Webb, 1902]. Biographical Sketches and Pictures of Company B, Confederate Veterans of Nashville, Tenn. Illustrated by Giers' Art Gallery. Brentwood, Tennessee: Beverly Pearson Barnes.
- Carey, Bill (2000). Fortunes, Fiddles, & Fried Chicken: A Nashville Business History. Franklin, Tennessee: Hillsboro Press. ISBN 1-57736-178-4.
- Duke, Jan (2005). Historic Photos of Nashville. Nashville, Tennessee: Turner. ISBN 978-1-59652-184-1.
- Durham, Walter T (2008). Nashville: The Occupied City, 1862–1863. Knoxville, Tennessee: University of Tennessee Press. ISBN 978-1-57233-633-9.
- Durham, Walter T (2008). Reluctant Partners: Nashville and the Union, 1863–1865. Knoxville, Tennessee: University of Tennessee Press. ISBN 978-1-57233-634-6.
- Egerton, John; et al., eds. (1979). Nashville: The Faces of Two Centuries, 1780–1980. Nashville, Tennessee: PlusMedia. LCCN 79089173. OCLC 5875892.
- Egerton, John; et al., eds. (2001). Nashville: An American Self-Portrait. Nashville, Tennessee: Beaten Biscuit. ISBN 0-9706702-1-4.
- Haugen, Ashley D (2009). Historic Photos of Nashville in the 50s, 60s and 70s. Nashville, Tennessee: Turner. ISBN 978-1-59652-539-9.
- Houston, Benjamin (2012). The Nashville Way: Racial Etiquette and the Struggle for Social Justice in a Southern City. Athens: University of Georgia Press. ISBN 978-0-8203-4327-3.
- Lovett, Bobby L (1999). African-American History of Nashville, Tennessee, 1780–1930: Elites and Dilemmas. University of Arkansas Press. ISBN 1-55728-555-1.
- McGuire, Jim (2007). Historic Photos of the Opry: Ryman Auditorium, 1974. Nashville, Tennessee: Turner. ISBN 978-1-59652-373-9.
- Potter, Susanna H (2008). Nashville & Memphis. Moon Handbooks. Berkeley, California: Avalon Travel. ISBN 978-1-59880-102-6.
- Romine, Linda (2006). Nashville & Memphis. Frommer Guides (7th ed.). Hoboken, New Jersey: Frommer's. ISBN 0-471-77614-9.
- Spinney, Robert Guy (May 1, 1998). World War II in Nashville: Transformation of the Homefront. Knoxville, Tennessee: University of Tennessee Press. ISBN 978-1-57233-004-7.
- Winders, Jamie (2013). Nashville in the New Millennium: Immigrant Settlement, Urban Transformation, and Social Belonging. New York: Russell Sage Foundation. ISBN 978-1-61044-802-4.
- Wooldridge, John; et al., eds. (1890). History of Nashville, Tennessee. Nashville, Tennessee: Methodist Episcopal Church, South. LCCN 76027605. OCLC 316211313.
- Zepp, George R (2009). Hidden History of Nashville. Charleston, South Carolina: History Press. ISBN 978-1-59629-792-0.
