= J. Alexander's =

American restaurant company

J. Alexander's Holdings Inc.
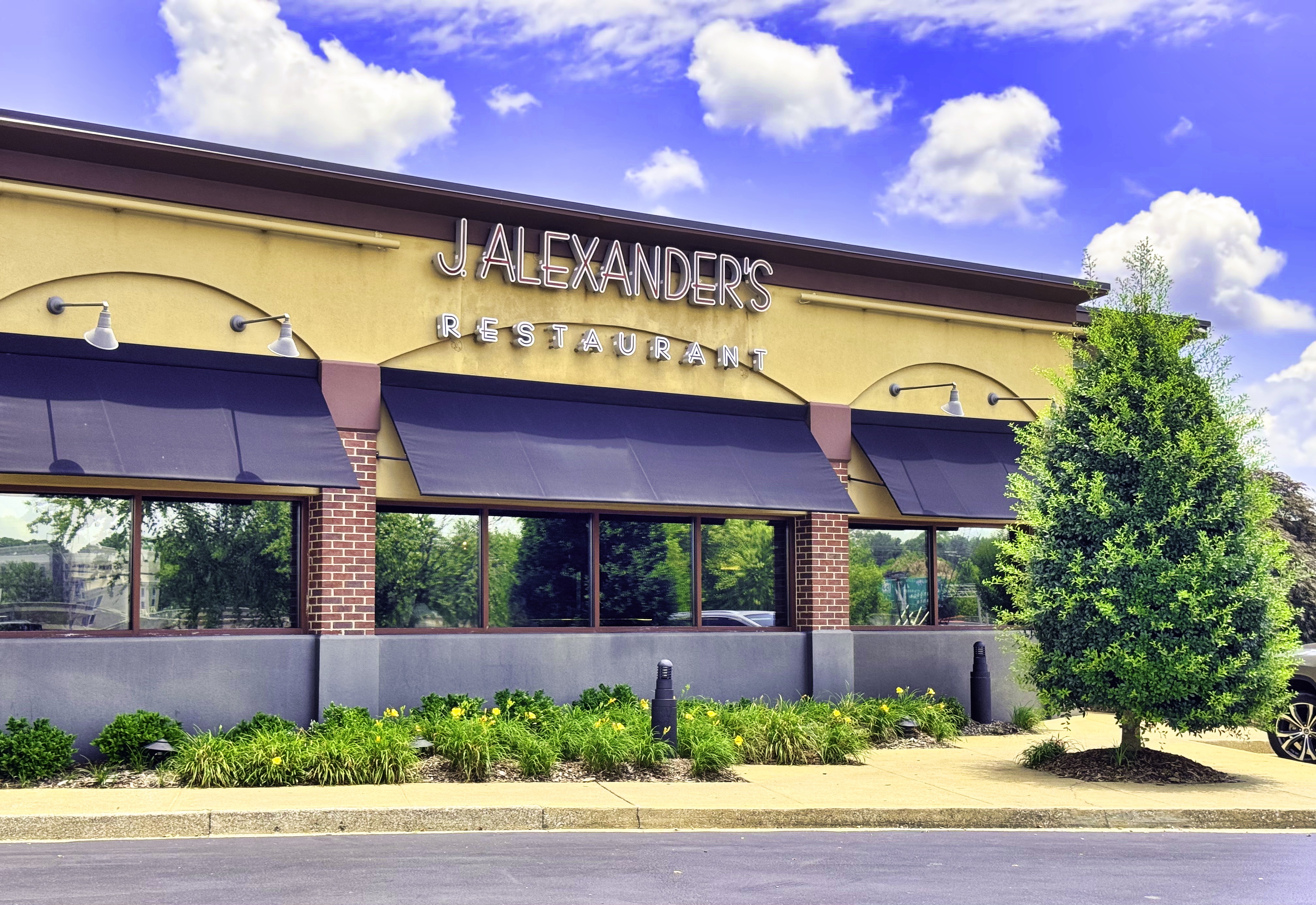
- A J. Alexander's restaurant in Chattanooga, Tennessee
- Type: Subsidiary
- Industry: Food service
- Founded: 1971; 55 years ago
- Headquarters: Nashville, Tennessee, United States
- Number of locations: 44 (2017)
- Key people: Mark Parkey (CEO); Jessica Hagler (CFO); Mike Moore (COO)
- Services: Restaurants
- Revenue: ▲US$304 million (2016)
- Operating income: ▼US$6 million (2007)
- Net income: US$4 million (2007)
- Total assets: ▲US$104 million (2007)
- Total equity: ▲US$62 million (2007)
- Number of employees: 2,700
- Parent: SPB Hospitality
- Subsidiaries: Stoney River Steakhouse & Grill, Redlands Grill, Lyndhurst Grill
- Website: www.jalexanders.com

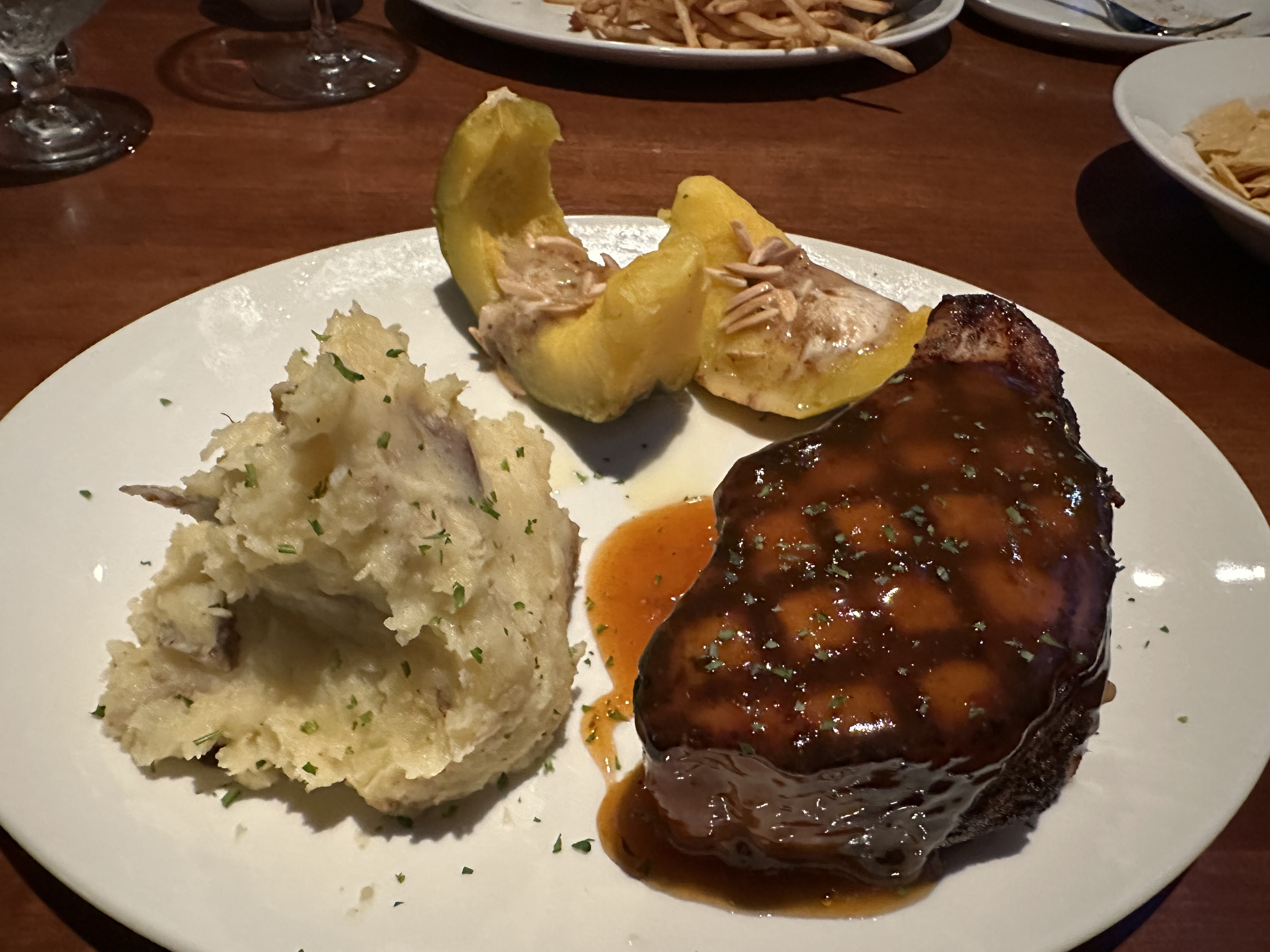
A plate including a roasted pork chop, smashed potatoes and acorn squash from J. Alexander's in Boca Raton, Florida.

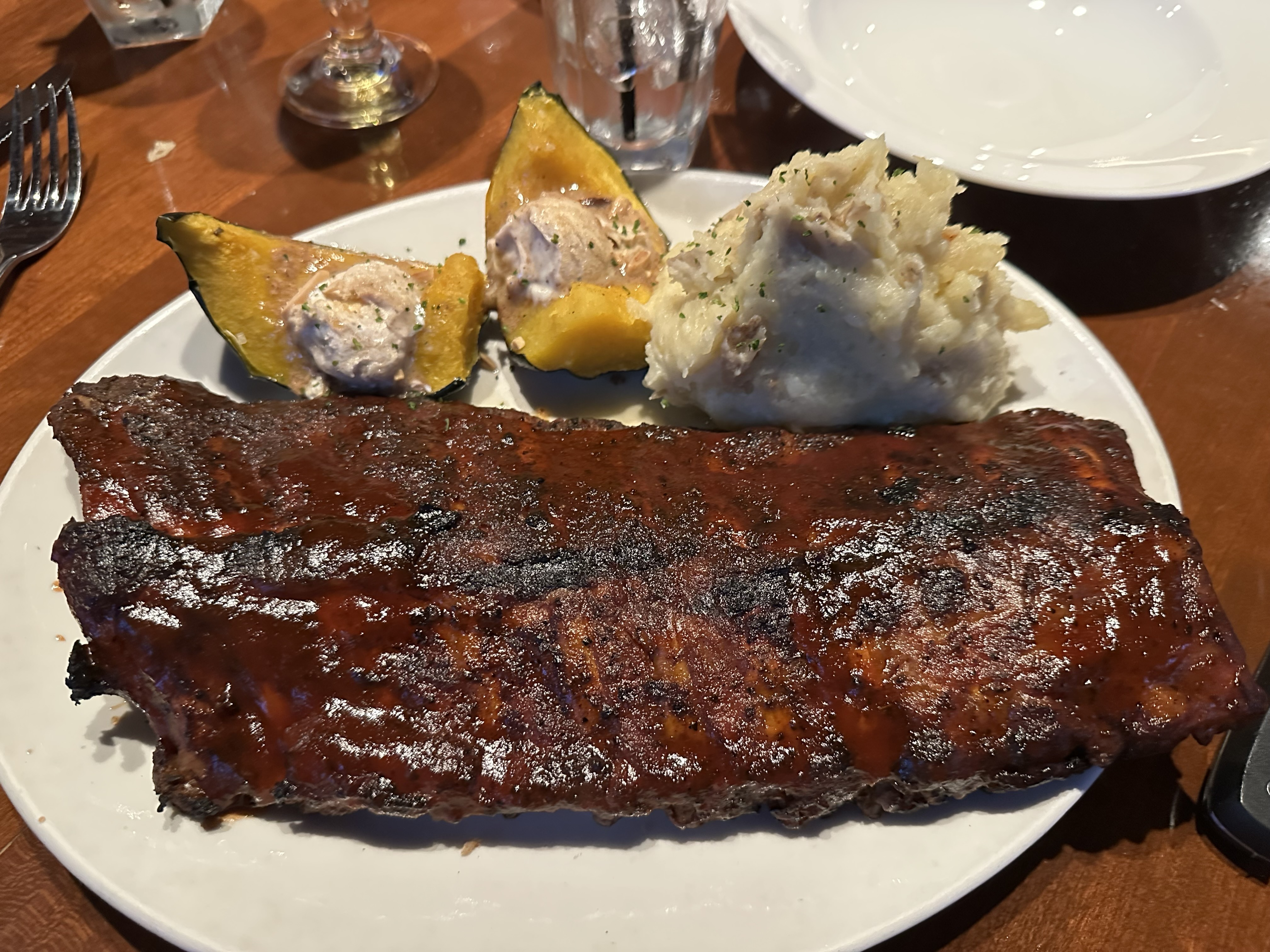
A plate including ribs, smashed potatoes and acorn squash from J. Alexander's in Boca Raton, FL

J. Alexander's Holdings Inc. is an American restaurant company that operates several casual dining restaurant chains. The company is headquartered in Nashville, Tennessee.

== History ==
The company was founded in 1971 as Volunteer Capital Corporation by three Nashville businessmen, Jack C. Massey, Earl Beasley Jr. and John Neff Jr. The first restaurant was opened in Nashville, Tennessee, in 1991.

J. Alexander's was acquired by Fidelity National Financial in 2012. It was spun off in 2015. It nearly acquired Ninety Nine Restaurant and Pub from Fidelity National Financial in 2017, but the deal was ultimately broken off due to shareholder opposition to Fidelity regaining controlling stake. In 2019, J. Alexanders had 46 restaurants in 16 different states.

In April 2020, it reported that J. Alexander's received $15.1 million from the Paycheck Protection Program (PPP) as part of the CARES Act, a program intended to assist small businesses during the COVID-19 pandemic in the United States. Days later, J. Alexander's returned all of the money it had received.

On July 2, 2021, J. Alexander's announced that it would be acquired by Logan's Roadhouse parent SPB Hospitality for $220 million. The acquisition was completed on September 30, 2021.

== Customer service ==
In 2019, the company was the target of a class action lawsuit for racial discrimination. At a Michigan restaurant, a black customer said she was asked to give up her seat for a white patron. The company denied the charges.
