= The Summit at Fritz Farm =

Lifestyle center in Lexington, Kentucky, United States

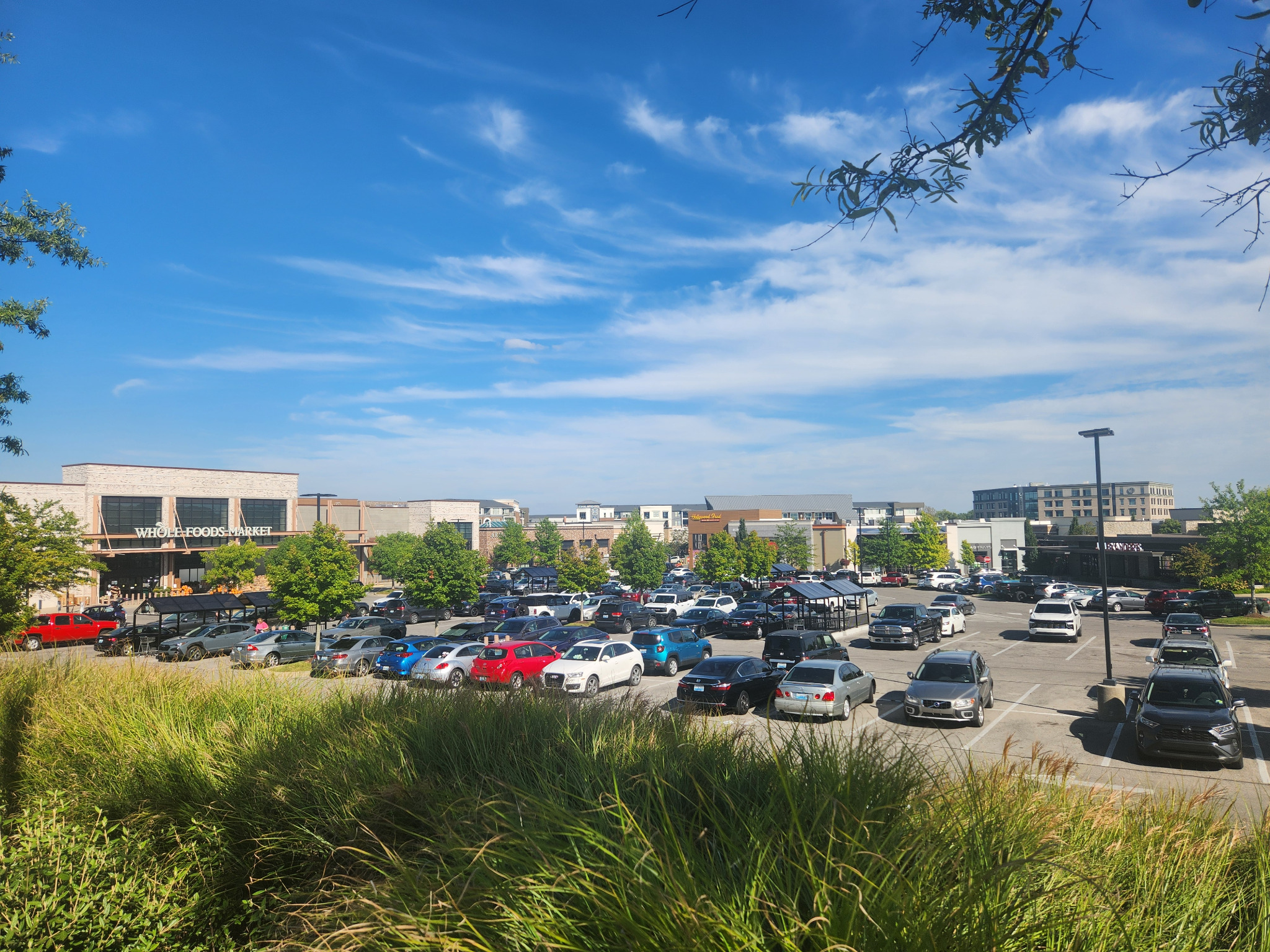
- Wide view of the development showing Whole Foods Market and surrounding shops, September 2025
- Location: Lexington, Kentucky, U.S.
- Coordinates: 37.977246°N 84.526025°W
- Address: 120 Summit At Fritz Farm, Lexington, KY 40517
- Opened: 2017
- Developer: Bayer Properties
- Owner: Hendricks Commercial Properties
- Num. of stores: 60+
- Num. of anchor tenants: 1
- Floor area: 300,000 sq ft (28,000 m²)
- Floors: 1
- Public transit: LexTran
- Website: thesummitatfritzfarm.com

The Summit at Fritz Farm is a regional mixed-use lifestyle center in Lexington, Kentucky, located at the intersection of Nicholasville Road and Man o' War Boulevard. The development features over 60 street-level shops and more than 20 dining options, along with two hotels. Major tenants include Whole Foods Market, Pottery Barn, Anthropologie, and Arhaus.

== History ==
Following the opening of Fayette Mall in 1971, commercial development expanded rapidly along Nicholasville Road during the latter half of the 20th century. This growth surrounded the Fritz family's 52-acre farm, making agricultural operations increasingly difficult. Seeking to adapt to the changing landscape, the family petitioned for the property to be rezoned for mixed-use development.

In 2009, the Lexington Planning Commission adopted the South Nicholasville Road Small Area Plan, which rezoned both the Fritz farm and a nearby 103-acre horticultural research farm to allow mixed-use retail, commercial, and residential development.

In 2013, the property was sold to Bayer Properties, a Birmingham-based developer known for lifestyle centers. Groundbreaking took place in 2015, and the development officially opened in spring 2017.

The Summit debuted with Whole Foods Market as its anchor, alongside national retailers including Pottery Barn, Arhaus, Anthropologie, and Williams Sonoma. By 2022, brands such as Apple, Nike, and Pandora relocated from other Lexington shopping areas to the center.

In May 2025, Hendricks Commercial Properties acquired The Summit at Fritz Farm for approximately $137 million from a partnership of Swift Creek Real Estate Partners and Centennial Real Estate Management; the sale excluded the Origin Hotel and a senior housing component.

== Tenants ==
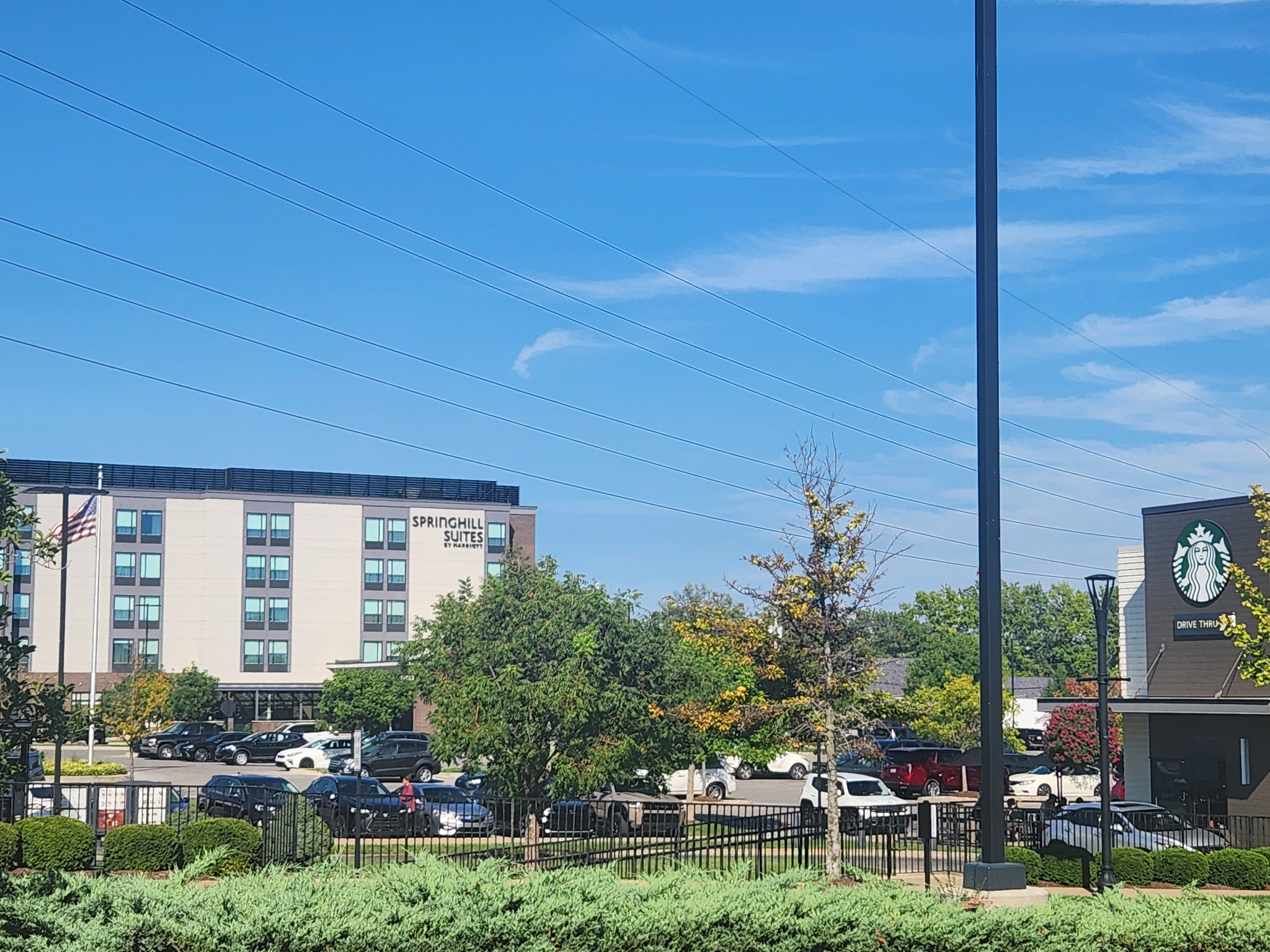
SpringHill Suites hotel on the property

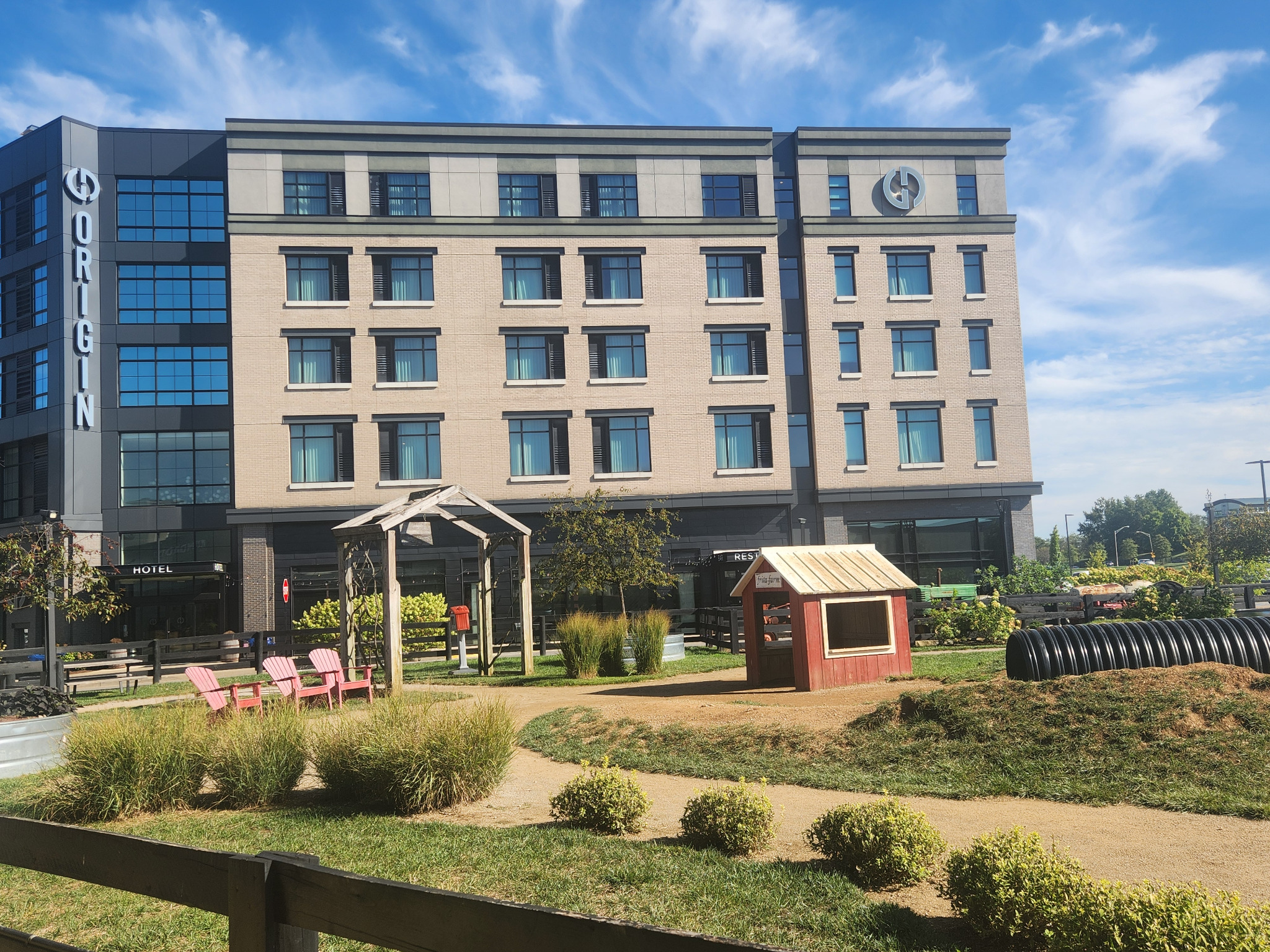
The Origin Hotel and adjacent play area at The Summit

The Summit at Fritz Farm includes retail, dining, residential, and hotel space in an open-air layout. Whole Foods Market serves as the anchor tenant. Other major retailers include Apple, Nike, Pottery Barn, Anthropologie, Arhaus, and Williams Sonoma, alongside boutique and regional shops. As of 2025, the property includes over 60 street-level shops and more than 20 dining options. Two on-site hotels—Origin Hotel Lexington and SpringHill Suites—serve the development.

== Gallery ==
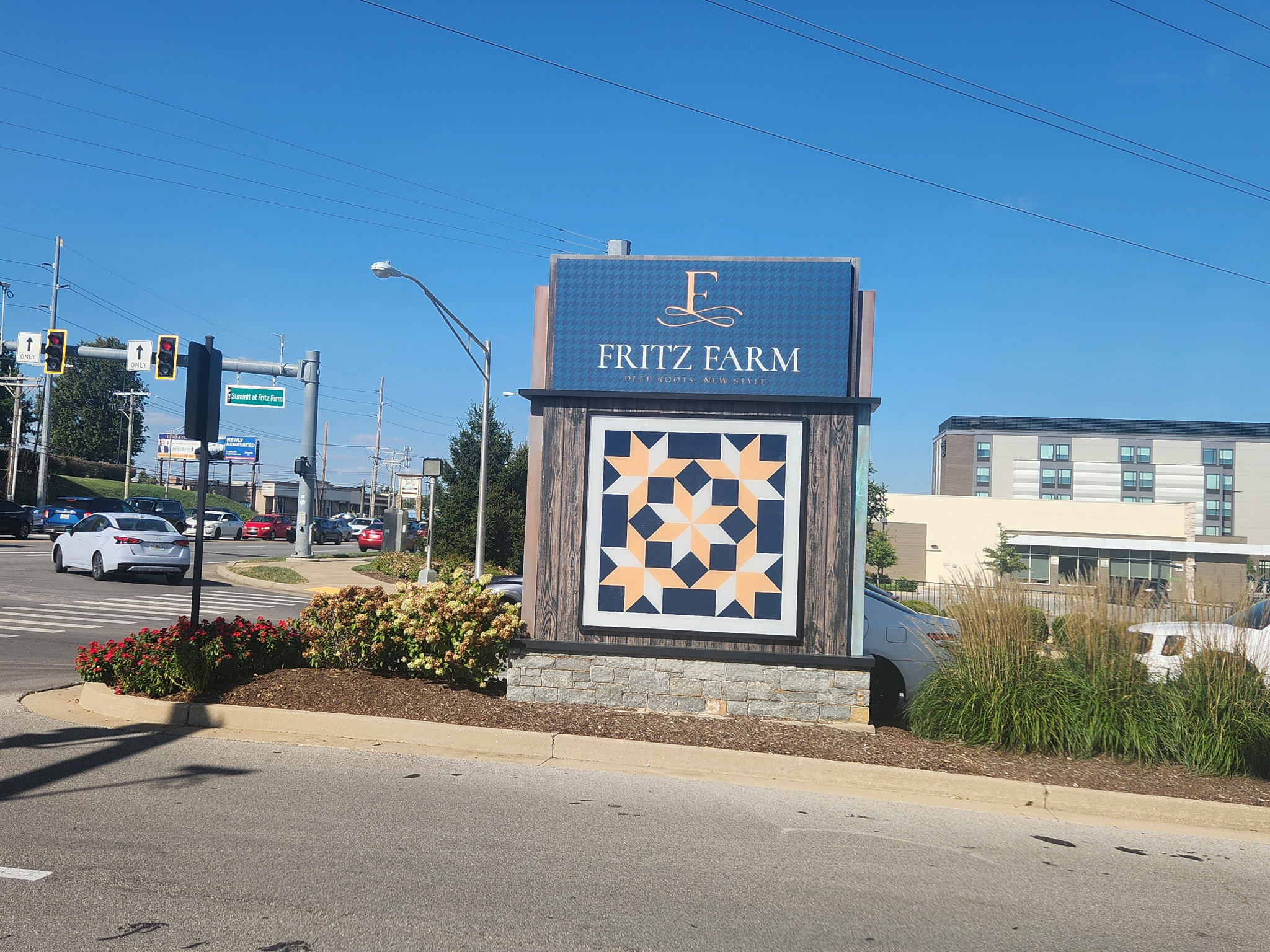
Monument sign at the main entrance

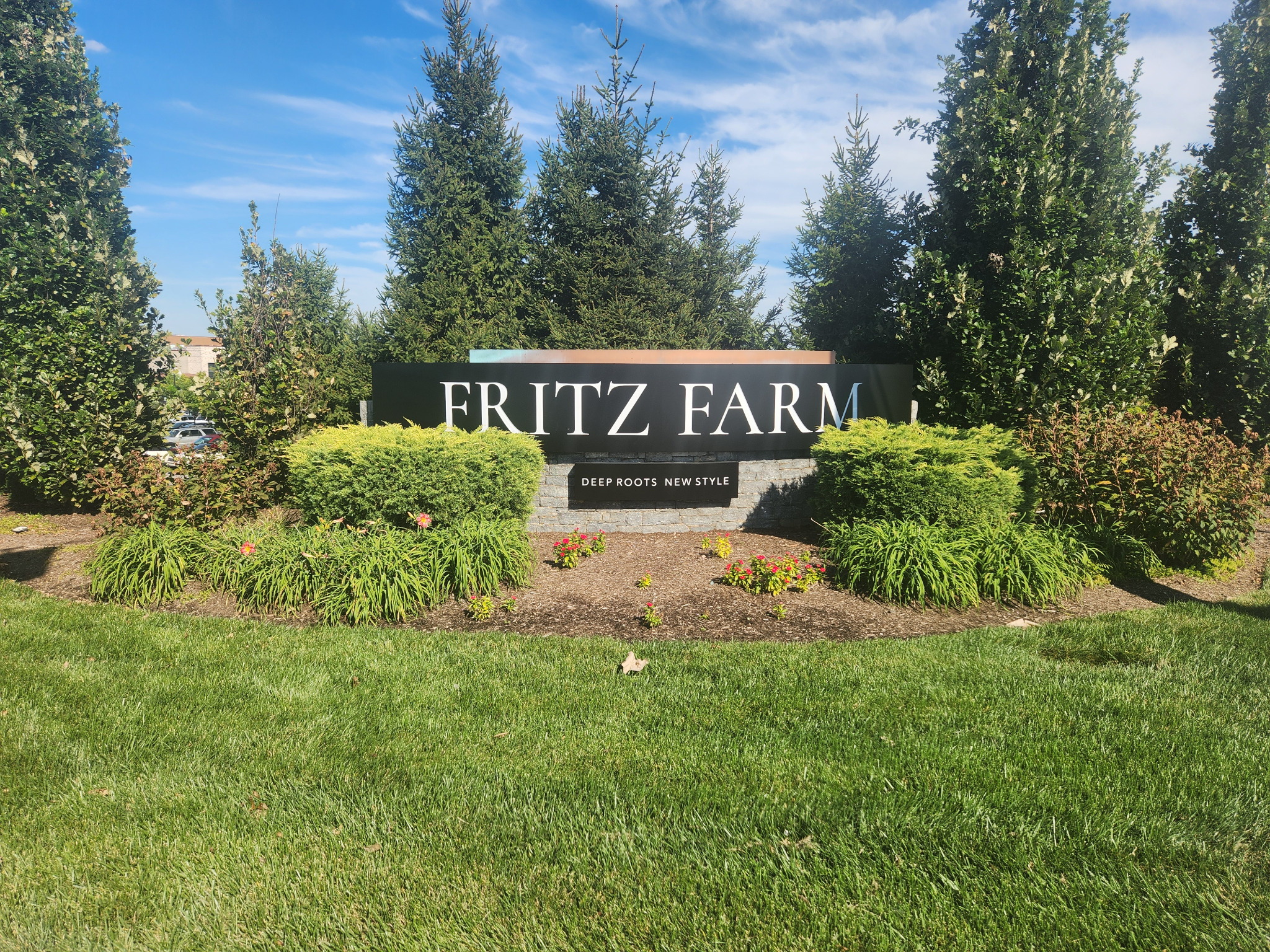
Corner sign at Nicholasville Road and Man O’ War Boulevard

== See also ==
- Hamburg Pavilion
