= Hamburg Pavilion =

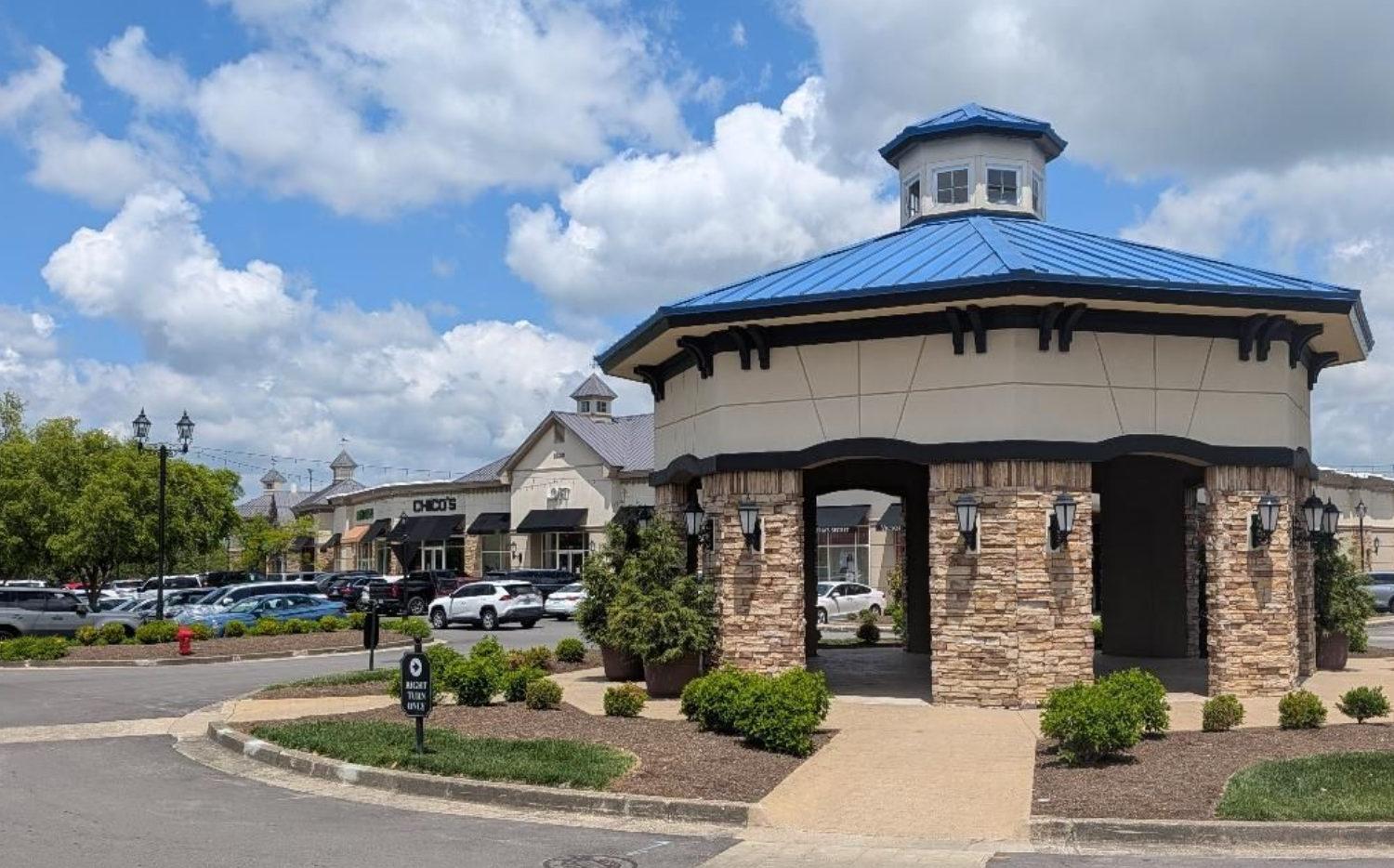
- The Hamburg Pavilion in 2026.
- Location: Lexington, Kentucky, United States
- Coordinates: 38°1′18″N 84°25′7″W
- Address: 2308 Sir Barton Way, Lexington Kentucky 40509
- Opened: 1997
- Developer: Thomas Land Development
- Manager: Fairbourne Properties
- Num. of stores: 75
- Floor area: 989,779 square feet (91,953 m^{2})
- Public transit: Lextran 10 (Hamburg Pavilion)
- Website: hamburgpavilion.com

Hamburg Pavilion is a regional shopping center located along I-75 and Man o' War Boulevard in Lexington, Kentucky. It is one of the state's largest shopping centers with approximately one million square feet (93,000 m^{2}) of retail space. Its anchors are Target, PetSmart, Kohl's, Bob's Discount Furniture, Marshalls, Burlington, Dick's Sporting Goods, Regal Cinemas, Barnes & Noble, At Home, and Best Buy.

Restaurants include Outback Steakhouse, The Local Taco, Old Chicago Pizza + Taproom, Logan's Roadhouse, and Ted's Montana Grill.

Hamburg Pavilion occupies the area where horse trainer John E. Madden established a celebrated farm in 1898. Madden purchased the land with money earned from selling a champion stallion called Hamburg, naming the farm "Hamburg Place" after the horse. and In the late 1980s, John Madden's grandson, Preston Madden, converted part of the farm to commercial use. Thomas Land and Development, later known as Fourth Quarter Properties, acquired the land and developed Hamburg Pavilion, which opened in 1997. After the bankruptcy of Fourth Quarter Properties, Hamburg Pavilion was bought by a subsidiary of Starwood Capital Group in 2014, who owned the center until 2024. The property is currently managed by Chicago-based Fairbourne Properties.
