= Ninety Nine (restaurant chain) =

Regional US restaurant chain

99 Restaurants, LLC
- Trade name: The Ninety Nine Restaurant & Pub
- Company type: Subsidiary
- Founded: 1952; 74 years ago
- Headquarters: Woburn, Massachusetts, U.S.
- Number of locations: 97 (as of May 2023)
- Area served: Northeastern United States
- Parent: O'Charley's (2002–2012); American Blue Cross Holdings (2012-2018); Cannae Holdings (2018–present)
- Website: 99restaurants.com

The Ninety Nine Restaurant & Pub, also known as The Nines, is a chain of casual dining restaurants in the Northeastern United States. It is headquartered in Woburn, Massachusetts, with 97 locations (as of May 2023) in Massachusetts, Connecticut, Maine, New Hampshire, New York, Rhode Island, and Vermont.

== History ==
The Ninety Nine was founded in 1952 when Charles F. "Charlie" Doe (d. 2006) opened a restaurant at 99 State Street in Boston. The chain uses a horseshoe in its logo after Doe's wife gave him one to hang in his restaurant. Doe expanded the restaurant into the Boston suburbs and then to other states in New England, making him an early pioneer of the casual dining experience.

The chain was owned by Doe's family until 2002 when it was sold to Nashville-based O'Charley's group for $116 million cash and 2.35 million O'Charley's stock shares. At sale, the chain had 74 restaurants in New England. The chain marked 99 locations on December 6, 2004.

In 2012, O'Charleys and the Ninety Nine Restaurant brand were purchased by Fidelity National Financial for $221 million. 99 Restaurants, LLC was restructured as an asset of American Blue Cross Holdings, a joint venture of Fidelity National and Newport Global Advisors, remaining such when J. Alexander's was spun off. In 2017, J. Alexander's nearly purchased Fidelity's stake in American Blue Cross Holdings to acquire the Ninety Nine brand, but the deal was rejected in 2018 by J. Alexander shareholders, as it would have given majority ownership to Fidelity, their previous owner.

Following the failed deal, Ninety Nine was restructured under Cannae Holdings in 2018, a spinoff of Fidelity National Financial.
