= O'Charley's =

Defunct American casual dining restaurant

O'Charley's Restaurant & Bar
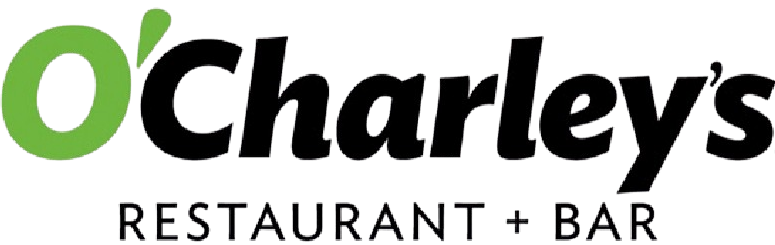
- Type: Subsidiary
- Industry: Restaurants
- Founded: 1971; 55 years ago in Nashville, Tennessee
- Founder: Charley Watkins
- Defunct: September 9, 2026 (corporate-owned locations); September 27, 2026 (Niles, Ohio location and corporate offices)
- Fate: Closed
- Headquarters: Nashville, Tennessee, United States
- Number of locations: 0 (2026)
- Key people: Lee Rathbun, President & Chief Administrative Officer
- Revenue: ▼US$830.1 million (2010)
- Operating income: ▼US$-17.3 million (2010)
- Net income: ▼US$-34.9 million (2010)
- Total assets: ▼US$422.7 million (2010)
- Total equity: ▼US$178.2 million (2010)
- Owner: Cannae Holdings Inc.
- Parent: Restaurant Growth Services, LLC
- Website: "O'Charley's Restaurant & Bar". Archived from the original on September 9, 2026.

An O'Charley's restaurant in Lebanon, Tennessee

O'Charley's Restaurant & Bar was an American casual dining restaurant. As of February 2026, the company operated 52 locations in Florida, Georgia, Illinois, Indiana, Kentucky, Mississippi, North Carolina, Ohio, Pennsylvania, South Carolina, Tennessee, Virginia, and West Virginia.

O'Charley's was part of the parent company O'Charley's, Inc. Enterprise, a multi-concept restaurant company that operated or franchised a total of 363 restaurants under three brands: O'Charley's, Ninety Nine Restaurant, and Stoney River Legendary Steaks. In 2012, O'Charley's, Inc. Enterprise was acquired by Fidelity National Financial and became part of American Blue Ribbon Holdings. In 2018, O'Charley's was split off from American Blue Ribbon Holdings and became a part of Cannae Holdings, Inc.

All O'Charley's corporate locations and Underground Chuck's locations ceased operations on September 9, 2026.

== History ==
Charles (Sonny) Watkins founded O'Charley's restaurant in 1971 on 21st Avenue South in Nashville, across the street from Vanderbilt University. Watkins ran O'Charley's from 1971 to 1984 when he sold the restaurant to David K. Wachtel. David K. Wachtel spent 23 years working for Shoney's where he eventually became president and chief executive officer of the restaurant company. Wachtel resigned from Shoney's in 1982. Wachtel intended to develop the O'Charley's restaurant into a restaurant chain. In mid-1987, the 12th O'Charley's opened in Lexington, Kentucky, occupying a site formerly used by the Bennigan's chain of restaurants. While the Lexington grand opening was under way, Wachtel was working on plans to convert two more Bennigan's units in Huntsville, Alabama, and Nashville, Tennessee, into O'Charley's.

In December 1993, Burns and McWhorter announced the formulation of a growth strategy designed to carry the 45-unit chain into the ranks of the country's largest regional dinner-house chains. In 1994, the company planned to open at least eight new O'Charley's restaurants, situating the new units primarily in southeastern markets, such as Cookeville, Tennessee; Louisville and Paducah, Kentucky; and Palm Harbor, Florida. There was an expectation of restaurants opening for the year, but as time continued past 1994 other issues hindered this expansion. In February 1994, Wachtel resigned as chairman of O'Charley's, citing his "pressing commitments" with other business interests, the most notable of which was the 300-unit Western Sizzlin' budget steakhouse chain he had acquired in 1993. Burns was named chief executive and co-chairman and McWhorter was tapped as president and co-chairman. One month after Wachtel's resignation, the company was advised that four former O'Charley's employees had filed a federal lawsuit charging the restaurant chain with racial discrimination practices against African Americans in the company's hiring, assignment, and promotion procedures. Burns denied the charges

In 2007, O'Charley's closed its Nashville commissary and distribution center, and began using Performance Food Group to distribute product to all of its locations. In 2013, O'Charley's launched "Free Pie Wednesday." Any dine-in customer ordering an entree on Wednesdays will receive a free slice of pie. In 2014 O'Charley's selected BOHAN Advertising as a marketing partner.

In April 2019, O'Charley's closed a single location in Florida. Three months later, O'Charley's abruptly closed eight locations in Indiana and Georgia in June 2019. The company had 201 locations in 2018, down from 213 in 2016. 2023, they closed the Bristol, VA location for good. In April 2023, the location in Mt. Juliet, Tennessee closed suddenly. In June 2023, seven locations (East Cobb, GA; Lexington, KY; Dothan, AL; Mobile, AL; Evansville, IN; Collierville, TN; Chattanooga, TN) had abrupt closings, with a notice appearing on the door or by email the day of the closing. August 2023 saw the closing of eighteen more locations (including Richmond, KY; Greenwood, SC; Dayton, OH; Miami Township, OH; Pearl, MS; Kingsport, TN; Gastonia, NC; St. Peters, MO), totaling 17% of all stores, close without prior notice. The Prattville, Alabama location closed in September 2023. The last Louisiana location in Lake Charles closed in October 2023, as well as a Salisbury, North Carolina location. In November 2023, ten more locations (Harrisonburg, VA; Lynchburg, VA; Hendersonville, NC; Rock Hill, SC; Foley, AL; Daphne, AL; Fultondale, AL, Griffin, GA; Cumming, GA; Georgetown, KY) closed their doors.

On September 8, 2026, reports from various media outlets were published stating that O'Charley's would close their remaining corporate-owned locations the following day. As of September 10, 2026, only one location remains open, in Niles, Ohio. An agreement was reached between franchisee Covelli Enterprises and O'Charley's to keep the restaurant open through the end of September.

== Awards ==
Named to Forbes "200 Best Small Companies in America" list for the third consecutive year in 2002. American Blue Ribbon Holdings was named by The Tennessean as a Top Workplace for 2014.
