= SPB Hospitality =

American restaurant company

- Type: Private
- Industry: Restaurant
- Founded: 2020; 6 years ago in Broomfield, Colorado
- Headquarters: Houston, Texas
- Key people: Josh Kern, (CEO); Jessica Hagler (CFO)
- Owner: Fortress Investment Group, Golden Child Holdings
- Number of employees: 18,000
- Website: https://www.spbhospitality.com/

SPB Hospitality is a multi-brand restaurant operator headquartered in Houston, Texas. The company owns several casual dining restaurant chain brands, including Logan's Roadhouse, Old Chicago Pizza + Taproom, J. Alexander's, Stoney River Legendary Steaks, Krystal Restaurants, Gordon Biersch Brewery Restaurants, and Rock Bottom Restaurants Breweries. It is the owner of the holdings of the former CraftWorks Company. As of November 2019, CraftWorks owned and operated over 390 restaurants in the United States, but all of its owned-and-operated locations closed by March 2020, after a Chapter 11 bankruptcy followed immediately by the COVID-19 pandemic in the United States, and CraftWorks terminated its 18,000 employees, leaving fewer than 25 employed. On June 12, 2020, SPB Hospitality purchased Craftworks businesses out of bankruptcy for $93 million.

== History ==
In 1976, the first Old Chicago taphouse opened in Boulder, Colorado. The first Gordon Biersch Brewery Restaurant was opened in Palo Alto, California on July 6, 1988. The first Rock Bottom restaurant opened in Denver, Colorado in 1991. In 1993, Big River Breweries opened its first location in Chattanooga, Tennessee.

Rock Bottom Restaurants, Inc., made an initial public offering in 1994. In 1995, the first ChopHouse opened in Denver, Colorado. Big River Breweries opened the only brewpub at Walt Disney World in 1996. A private management buyout took Rock Bottom Restaurants, Inc. private in 1999. In the same year, Gordon Biersch was acquired by Big River Breweries. In 2000, Rock Bottom Restaurants formed the Rock Bottom Foundation, a 501(c)(3) non-profit entity. Rock Bottom Restaurants laid off about 20% of its corporate staff in 2007 and slowed its growth plans along with ceasing its search for an equity partner. In 2010, Rock Bottom Restaurants and Gordon Biersch Brewery Restaurant Group were acquired by Centerbridge Capital Partners and merged to form CraftWorks Restaurants and Breweries, Inc.

On November 1, 2018, CraftWorks announced that it had acquired Logan's Roadhouse and formed Craftworks Holdings. Logan's Roadhouse is a chain of restaurants founded in 1991 in Lexington, Kentucky. The chain's menu includes mesquite-grilled steaks, traditional American fare (sandwiches, soup, salads, and seafood), ice-cold longneck beer, and homemade yeast rolls.

On June 12, 2020, Craftworks was purchased by SPB Hospitality for $93 million. SPB Hospitality is an affiliate of Fortress Investment Group.

In 2021, SPB Hospitality acquired J. Alexander's Holdings.

In 2023, SPB acquired Krystal Restaurants.

=== Bankruptcy and sale to SPB Hospitality ===
On March 3, 2020, CraftWorks filed for Chapter 11 bankruptcy reorganization. At the same time, the company entered into an agreement with affiliates of Fortress Credit Co. LLC, its senior lenders, to sell the company for at least $138 million, plus the assumption of certain liabilities, CraftWorks said in a news release.

However, Fortress Credit later withdrew a $23 million loan for continuing operations; it then agreed to fund $6 million to finance continuing operations, and on April 1, 2020, CraftWorks terminated nearly all 18,000 of their employees and terminated health care benefits as of March 31, 2020.

== Brands ==
- Gordon Biersch Brewing Company
- J. Alexander's
- Krystal
- Logan's Roadhouse
- Old Chicago Pizza & Taproom
- Redland's Grill
- Rock Bottom Restaurant Breweries
- Stoney River Legendary Steaks

=== Logan's Roadhouse ===
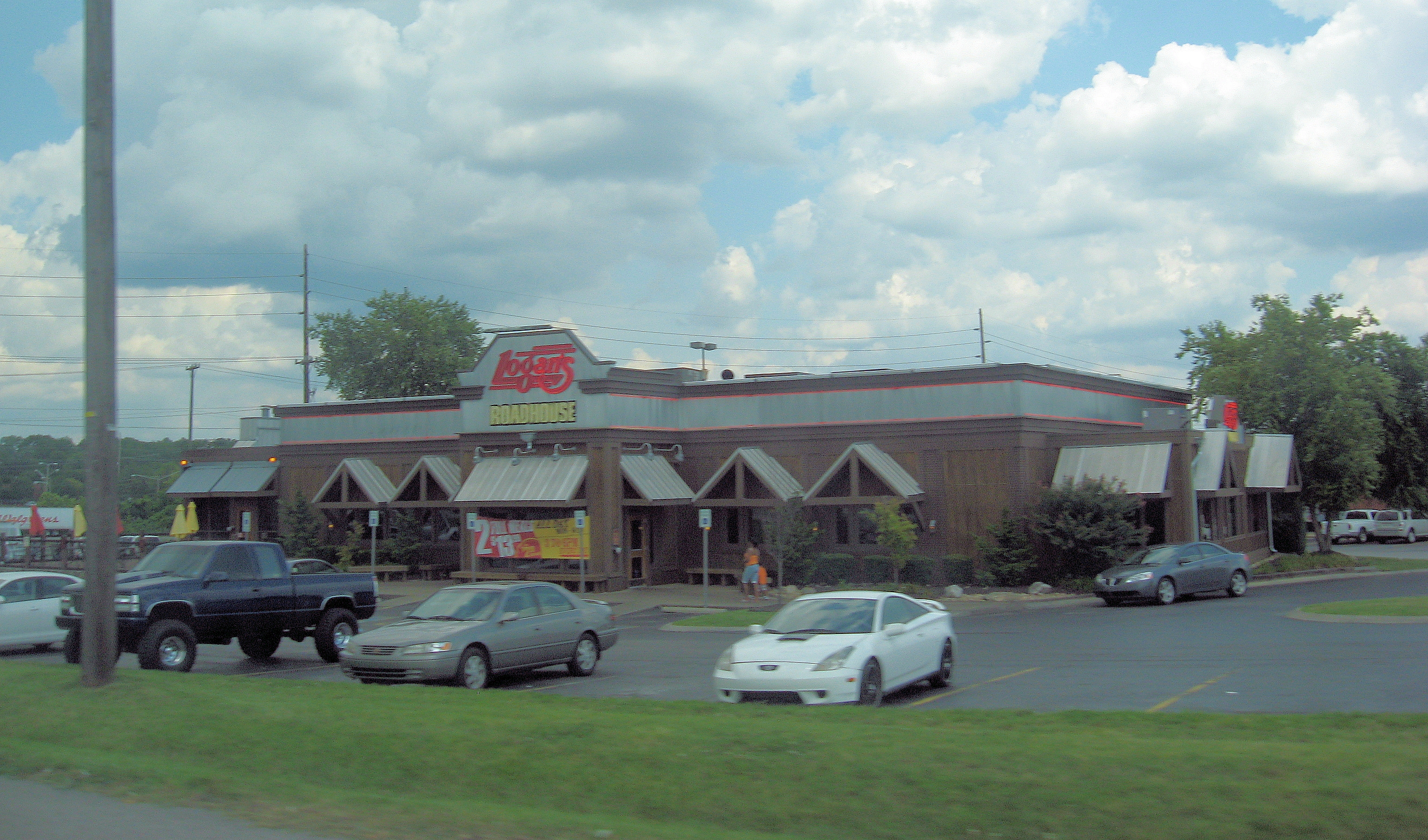
Logan's Roadhouse, Goodlettsville, Tennessee

Logan's Roadhouse serves American food. The chain's menu includes mesquite-grilled steaks, traditional American fare (sandwiches, soup, salads, and seafood), ice-cold longneck beer, homemade yeast rolls, and unlimited buckets of in-shell peanuts. Logan's serves appetizers, steak, and hamburgers, and offers side dishes such as salad, french fries, homestyle potato chips, rice pilaf and sweet or baked potatoes.

=== Old Chicago Pizza & Taproom ===
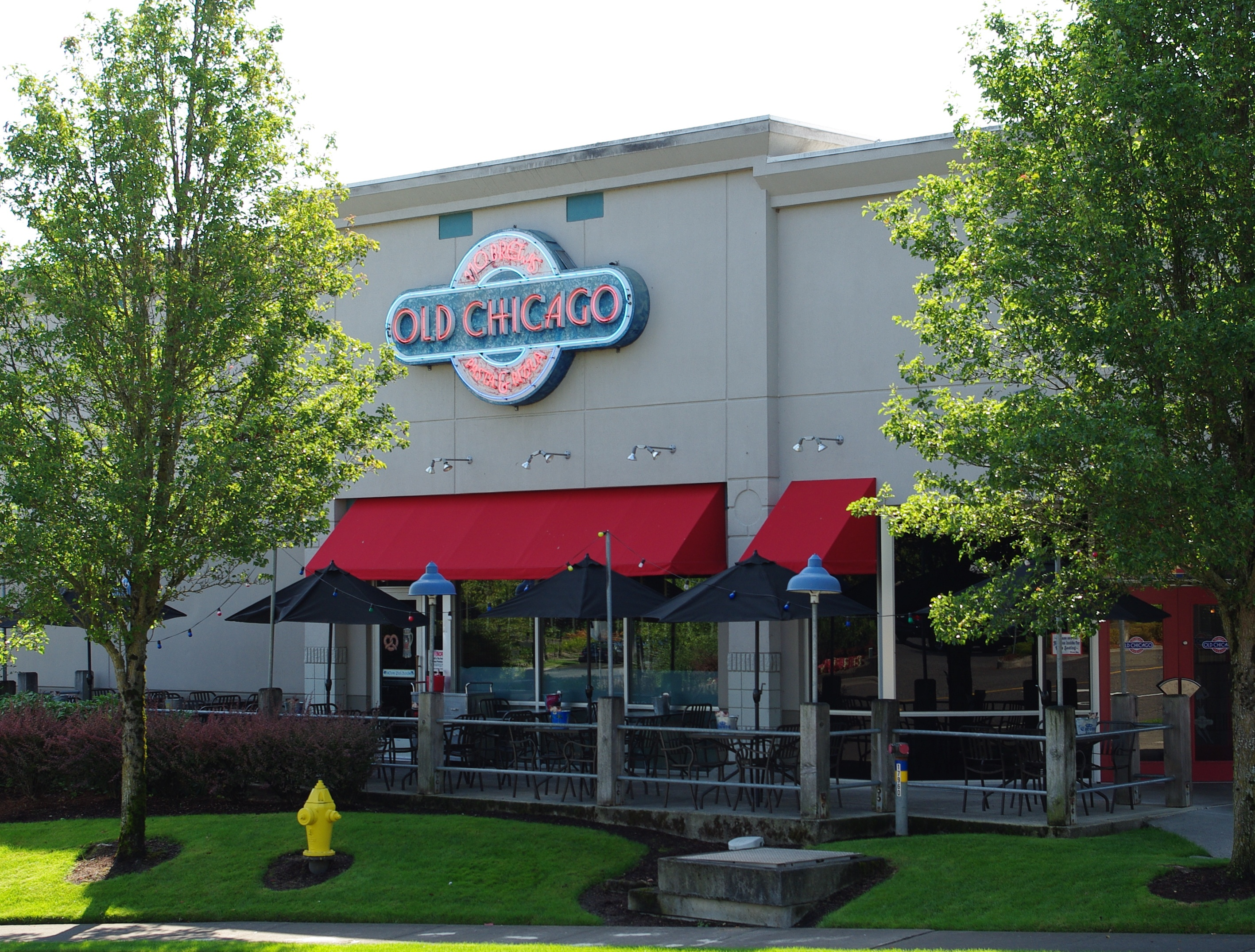
Old Chicago, Hillsboro, Oregon

SPB operates 52 restaurants under the name Old Chicago in 21 states.

=== Gordon Biersch Brewery Restaurants ===
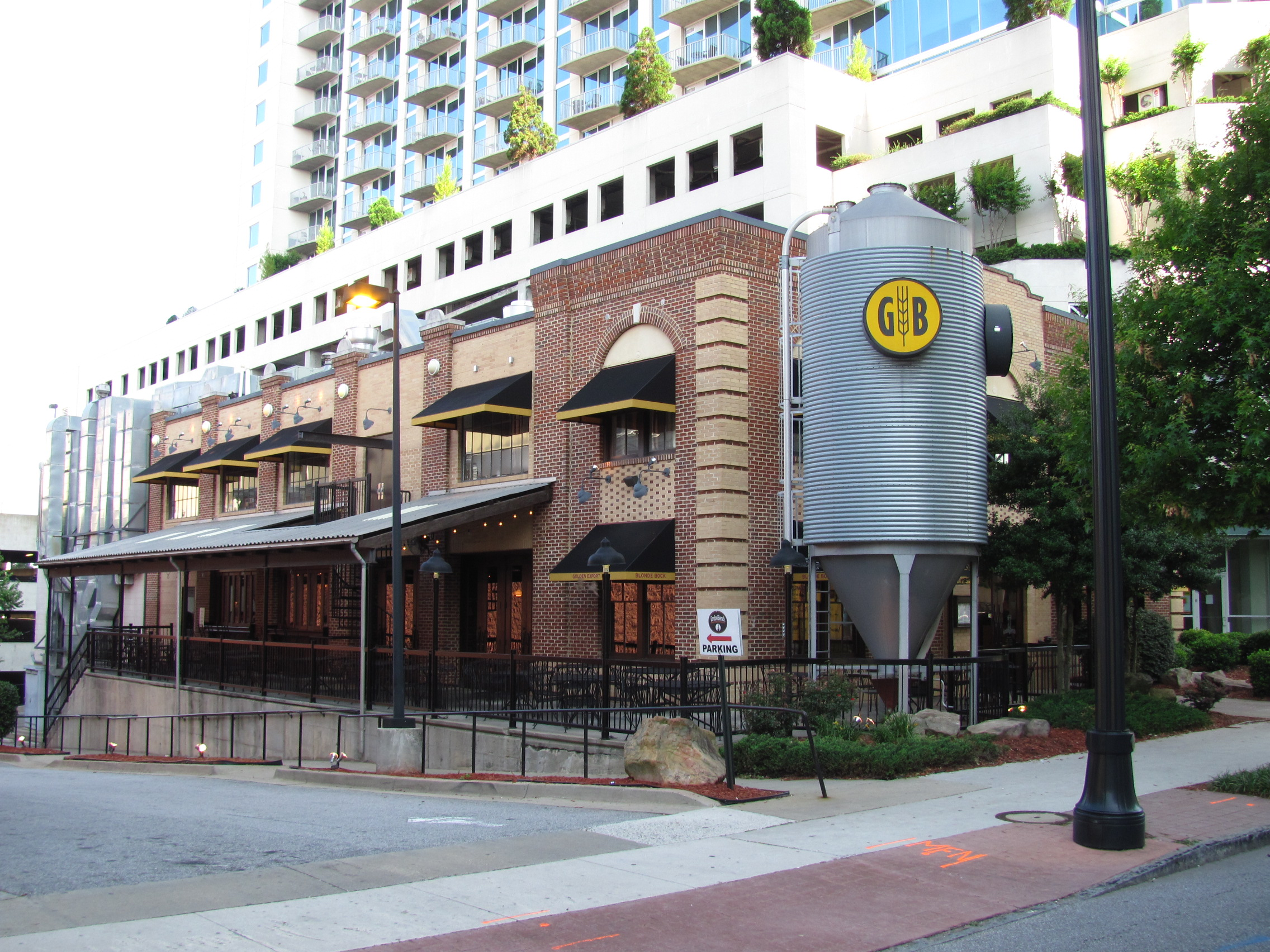
Gordon Biersch Brewery Restaurant, Atlanta, Georgia

Gordon Biersch combines German-style beer and its made-from-scratch cuisine. Featuring German lagers brewed according to the German Purity Law of 1516 (Reinheitsgebot), Gordon Biersch has won numerous gold medals at both the Great American Beer Festival and World Beer Cup. Gordon Biersch offers a made-from-scratch American menu with international flavors. The first Gordon Biersch opened in Palo Alto, California. The company was acquired by Big River Brewing Company in 1999 and later renamed Gordon Biersch Brewery Restaurant Group, Inc. The company reported six locations in Taiwan.

=== Rock Bottom Restaurant Breweries ===
The company operates 16 breweries under the name Rock Bottom Restaurant & Brewery. These breweries are located in several states, with five restaurants in Colorado, five in Illinois and one restaurant each in California, Florida, Maryland, Massachusetts, Minnesota and Virginia. The store was renamed Rock Bottom after someone pointed out that they were "building at the bottom of the rock," which was Prudential's slogan at the time. In 2000, the Boston-based Brew Moon Enterprises Inc. filed for bankruptcy and sold four of its five restaurant-microbreweries to Rock Bottom. In 2009, the La Jolla location in San Diego won a medal at the Great American Beer Festival, and in 2012 they medaled at the World Beer Cup. Rock Bottom Restaurants won Brewpub Group Brewer of the Year award at the 2013 Great American Beer Festival (GABF).

=== Stoney River Legendary Steaks ===
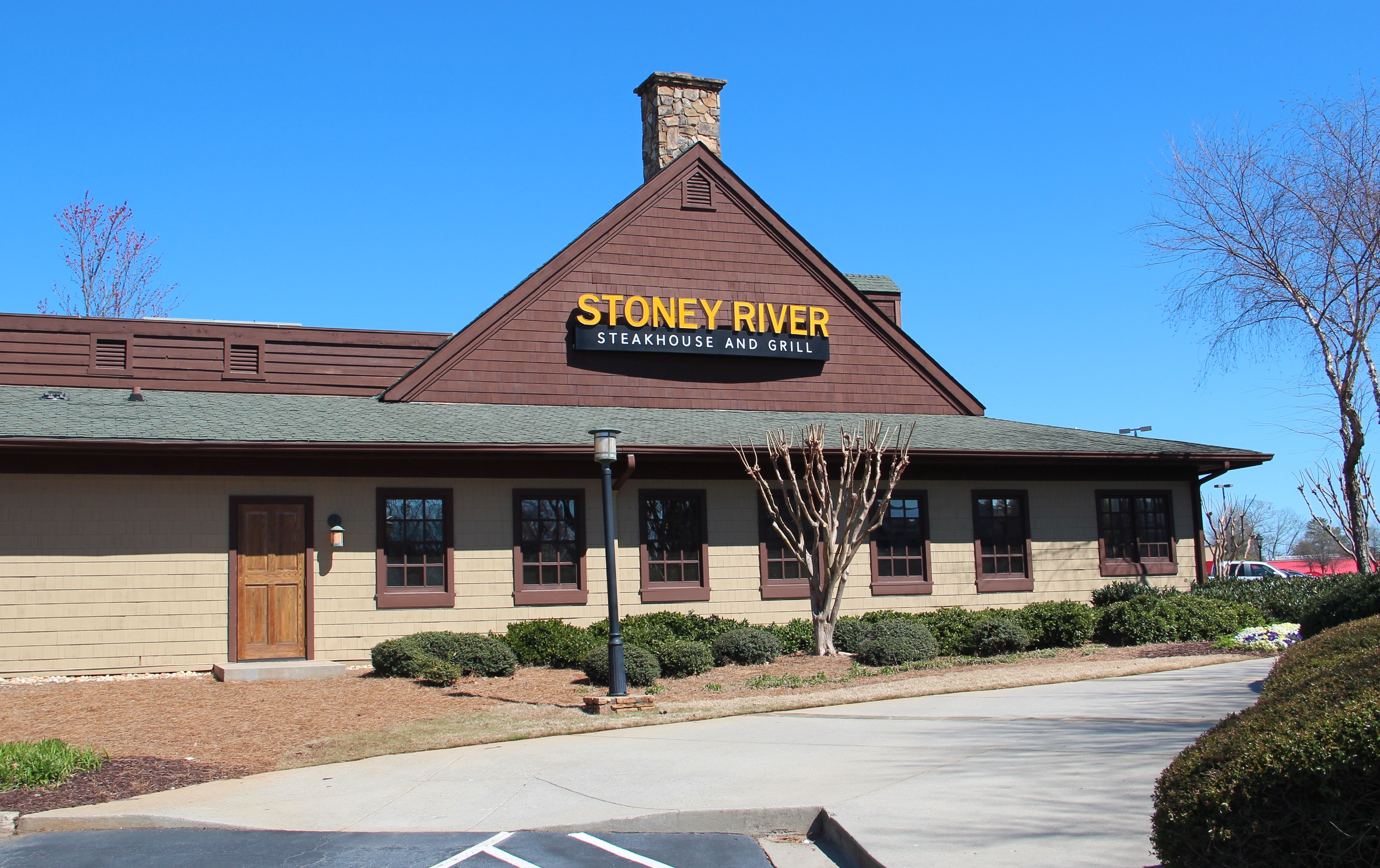
A Stoney River restaurant in Roswell, Georgia

Stoney River Steakhouse & Grill is a chain of steakhouses in the United States. In 2008, the company had 12 locations. As of 2025, there are ten Stoney River restaurants. In 2007, O'Charley's filed a lawsuit against competitor Darden claiming their Rocky River Grillhouse restaurant was too similar of a trademark to their Stoney River Legendary Steaks brand.
