= Logan's Roadhouse =

U.S. restaurant chain

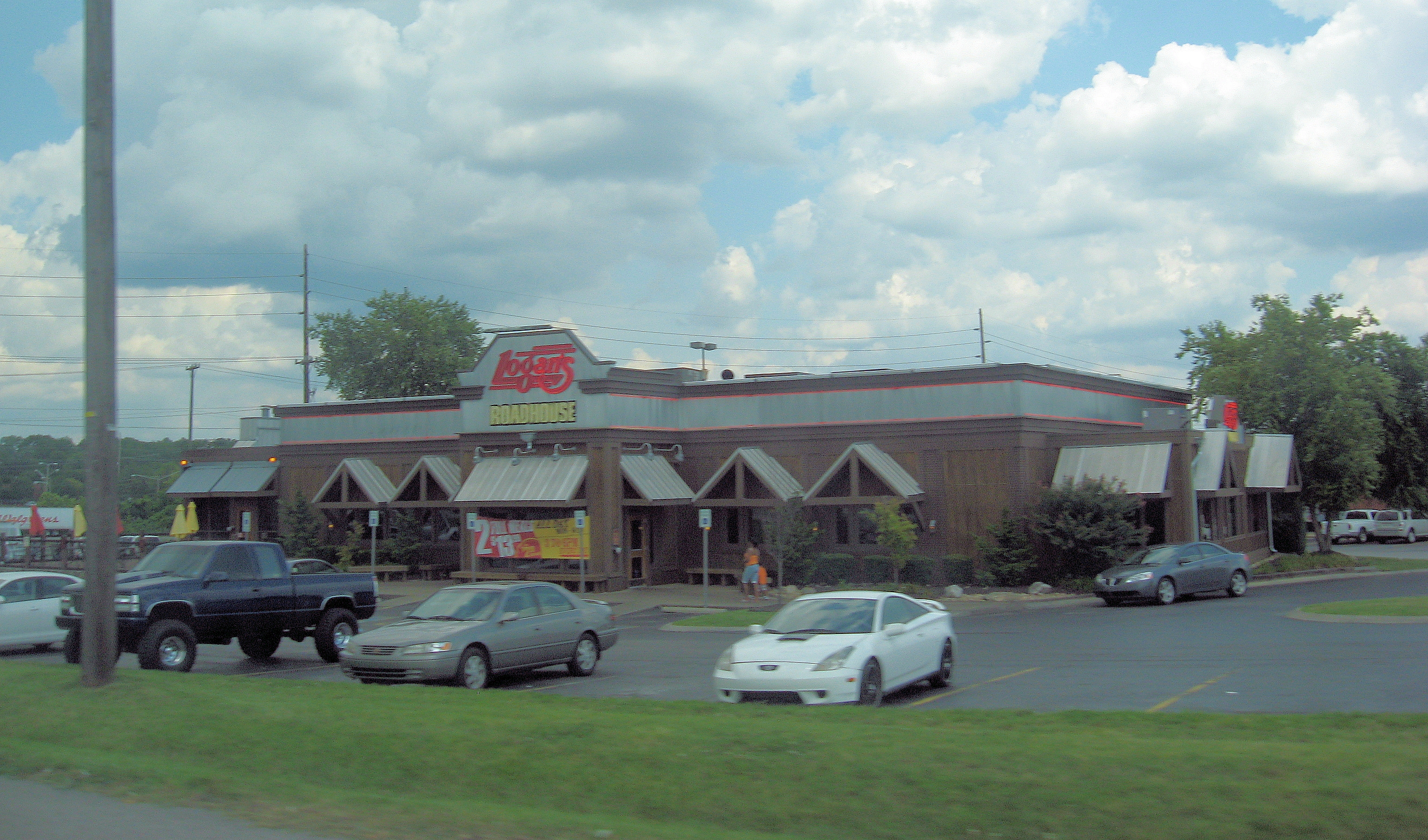
- A Logan's Roadhouse in Goodlettsville, Tennessee (now closed)
- Company type: Subsidiary
- Industry: Food service
- Genre: Casual dining
- Founded: 1991; 35 years ago Lexington, Kentucky, U.S.
- Founder: Dave Wachtel; Charles F. McWhorter
- Headquarters: Houston, Texas, U.S.
- Number of locations: 135
- Area served: United States
- Key people: Hazem Ouf (CEO); Stephen Anderson (Senior VP, Marketing); Len Popering (Chief marketing officer); Michelle Zavolta (Chief human resources officer)
- Products: Steaks, ribs, Burgers, chicken, Seafood, Sandwiches, Desserts, Family Meals, Alcoholic Beverages, Kids Menu, Appetizers, Soups and Salads
- Revenue: US$537 million (2021)
- Number of employees: 4,723 (2021)
- Parent: SPB Hospitality (2020-present)
- Website: www.logansroadhouse.com

Logan's Roadhouse is an American chain of casual dining restaurants based in Houston, Texas, United States, founded in 1991 in Lexington, Kentucky, U.S. There are 135 Logan's Roadhouse locations throughout twenty-two states.

The chain uses retro style decorations. Some of the Logan's establishments have locality-inspired decor and artwork. For example, Detroit area Logan's have murals of people wearing Detroit Pistons shirts. The chain's menu includes mesquite-grilled steaks, traditional American fare such as sandwiches, soup, salads, and seafood, longneck cold beer, and homemade yeast rolls.

== History ==
In 1999 it became a wholly owned subsidiary of the publicly held Cracker Barrel. On December 6, 2006, Logan's Roadhouse was sold to affiliates of Bruckmann, Rosser, Sherrill & Co., Canyon Capital Advisors LLC, and Black Canyon Capital LLC for $486 million. In 2010, private equity firm Kelso & Company acquired the company.

On February 20, 2013, Mike Andres, a former McDonald's vice-president and former chief executive officer of Boston Market, replaced Tom Vogel as chief executive officer. On January 12, 2017, Hazem Ouf, former chief executive officer of American Blue Ribbon Holdings, was named president and chief executive officer.

On August 8, 2016, Logan's Roadhouse filed for bankruptcy and announced plans to close eighteen of its 256 locations that are under-performing. The chain was reported to be struggling with heavy debt and falling sales. Locations closing in late September 2016, include, in Florida, two each in Kissimmee and Orlando, and one each in Mary Esther, Tampa, and Tallahassee; one in each of those cities: Macon, Georgia; Houston, Texas; Lafayette, Louisiana and Waynesboro, Virginia.

On December 1, 2016, Logan's Roadhouse formally exited bankruptcy with a debt load reduced from about $400 million to $100 million.

On November 1, 2018, Logan's Roadhouse announced that it was acquired by CraftWorks Restaurants & Breweries.

On March 3, 2020, Craftworks filed for Chapter 11 Bankruptcy protection. On March 19, 2020, all open Logan's locations were temporarily closed amid the COVID-19 pandemic. On April 4, 2020, Craftworks announced that all the Logan's Roadhouse locations would remain closed indefinitely, and that all 18,000 employees would be laid off.

On June 12, 2020, SPB Hospitality purchased Craftworks restaurants out of bankruptcy for $93 million.
