= List of Iberian horse breeds =

This is a list of the breeds of horse native to the Iberian Peninsula, and considered in Portugal and Spain to have originated wholly or partly in those countries. Inclusion here does not necessarily imply that a breed is predominantly or exclusively of Iberian origin.

The Altér Real, Garrano, Lusitano, Ponei da Terceira and Sorraia are of Portuguese origin; the Garrano is equivalent to the Pura Raza Gallega of Spain.

A Spanish Royal Decree of 2008 listed fourteen native breeds (Asturcón, Burguete, Caballo de Monte del País Vasco, Pura Raza Gallega, Pura Raza Española ("Andalusian"), Hispano-Árabe, Hispano-Bretón, Jaca Navarra, Losino, Mallorquín, Marismeño, Menorquín, Monchino and Pottoka), of which all but the Andalusian were at risk of extinction; the Spanish Trotter and Caballo de Deporte Español were listed separately. The Pirinenc Català was added in 2012, and the Caballo del las Retuertas in 2016. The Serrano received regional recognition from the Community of Madrid in 2011.

The horses of the peninsula are commonly classified in various groups or clades, confirmed by microsatellite studies. These may include: the northern or Atlantic Celtic ponies or small horses, which show similarities to British breeds such as the Exmoor Pony; the southern or Mediterranean breeds of Celtic origin, including the Mallorquín and Menorquín; the hot-blooded breeds, including the imported Arab and Thoroughbred, as well as the Spanish Trotter; and the Iberian horses, including the Pura Raza Española, the Lusitano, the Alter Réal and the Marismeño, which are closely related to the horses of North Africa. The Retuertas does not fall within any of these groups.

Local name(s)	English name if used	Image	Notes
Asturcón			2001 population: 873;semi-feral
Altér Real			Portugal
Burguete			2001 population: 3300; heavy work and meat horse
Caballo de deporte español	Spanish Sport Horse		2001 population: 2350
Caballo de las Retuertas	Retuertas		population 60-140; feral, first described in 2005
Caballo de Monte del País Vasco	Basque Mountain Horse		2001 population: 2300; semi-feral meat horse
Caballo de Pura Raza Gallega; Galician: Cabalo de Pura Raza Galega	Galician Pony		2001 population: 650;semi-feral; 20000–22000 unregistered horses, known as faco or del país; Spanish equivalent of the Garrano
Catalán			extinct since the first third of the twentieth century
Garrano			population >950; semi-feral; Portuguese equivalent of the Caballo de Pura Raza Gallega
Hispano-Árabe			2001 population: 2464
Hispano-Bretón			2001 population: 4561; work and meat
Jaca Navarra			2001 population: 390; semi-feral
Losino			2001 population: 169; semi-feral
Lusitano			Portugal; population 23619
Mallorquín			2001 population: 172
Marismeño			population 1051, semi-feral
Menorquín			2001 population: 1647
Mérens			population >7000
Monchino			2001 population: 1004
Pirinenc Català; Cavall Pirinenc Català			population 7133; recognised in 2012
Ponei da Terceira			Terceira Island, Azores, Portugal
Pottoka	Pottok		2001 population: 532; some semi-feral
Pura Raza Española; Española	Andalusian horse		2001 population: 75389
Serrano			not nationally recognised, regional recognition only (Community of Madrid)
Sorraia			Portugal, population >100, semi-feral
Trotador Español	Spanish Trotter		2001 population: 6823, of which 85% in the Balearic Islands
