= Meat horse =

Horses bred specifically for horse meat

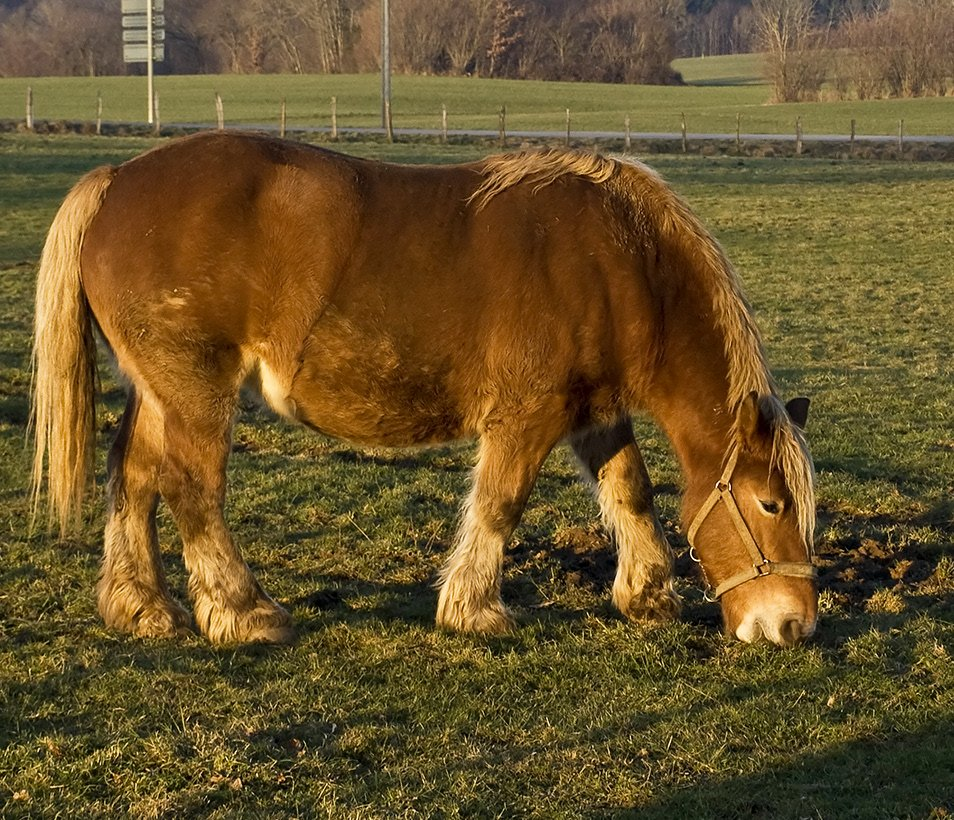
Meat horse of the Comtois breed

A meat horse, or slaughter horse, is a horse bred for its ability to yield meat. Coming from draft horses formerly used for agricultural work, these horses are threatened with extinction by the mechanization of agricultural activities. This state of affairs has prompted breeders to look for new economic outlets. Breeding for meat horses was very popular in France in the 1980s, helping to safeguard these breeds. It has developed in Italy and Spain, but is declining in France, due to the further reduction of work activities with draft horses.

Meat horses are selected for their speed of growth and fattening, as well for the mares' fertility and maternal qualities. This selection process is very different from that prevailing in a draft horse, and results in vulnerability to specific health problems. Meat horses are generally neither trained nor socialized by their breeders: they are slaughtered as foals, between six and thirty months old.

This type of farming makes it possible to enhance the value of grassland in difficult or declining areas, including cattle and sheep. It is also controversial due to the societal rejection of slaughtering horses and the practice of eating horse meat (hippophagy).

== Definition ==
The notion of "meat horse" is a French specificity: this term designates a livestock animal, the horse raised for the production of meat. Rural historian Marcel Mavré analyzes it as a degradation of the draft horse, the meat horse being a direct descendant of the draft horse, which is a working animal. The development/evolution of the meat horse is very similar to that of beef cattle, since draft cattle are used as beef cattle.

== History in France ==
The history of the meat horse is an example of "keeping breeds in business by changing their orientation".

=== Origin ===
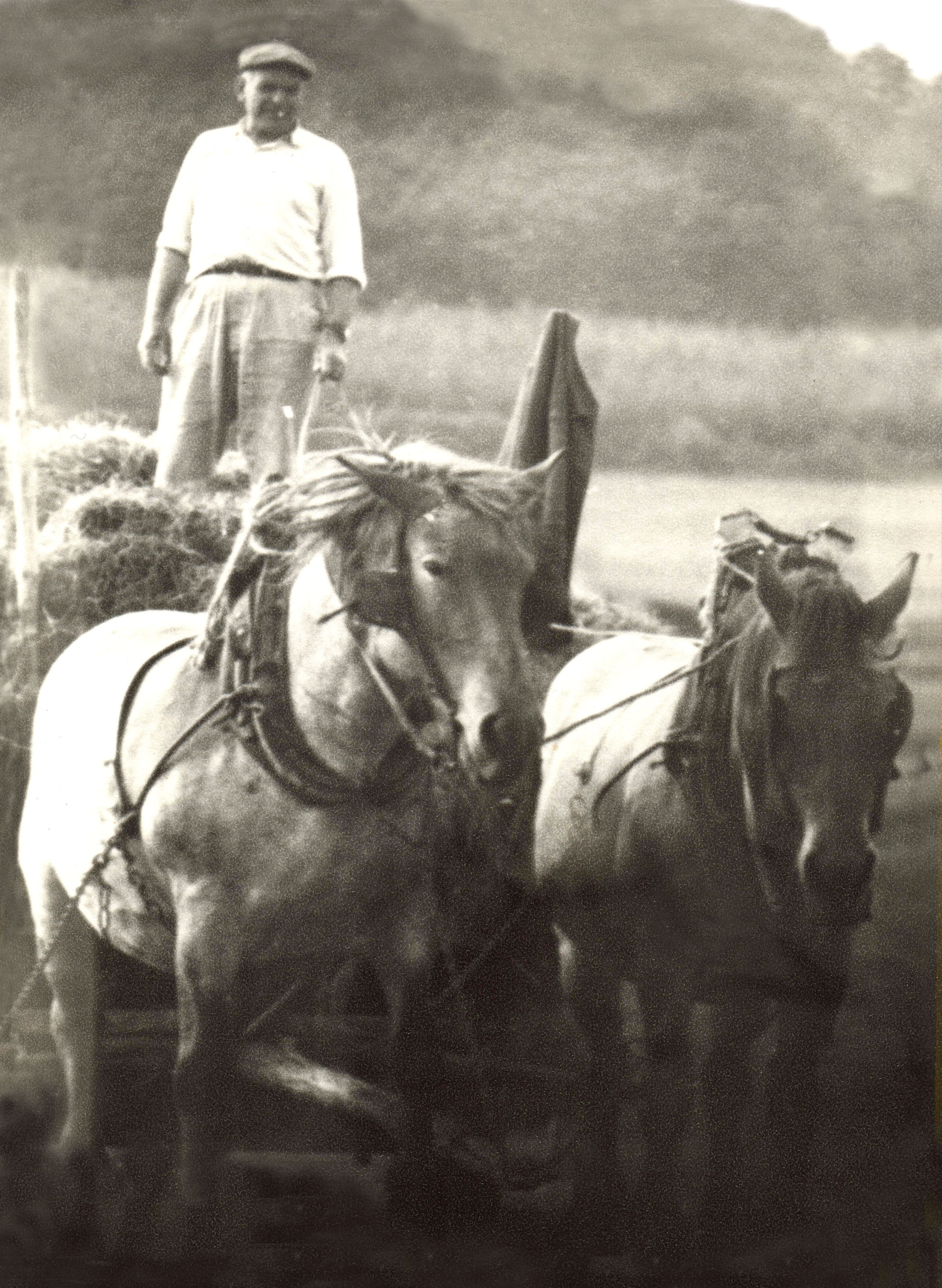
Ardennes draft horses during haymaking in July 1972 at Forrières.

Its origins date back to the 1960s in Europe, and particularly in France. Breeders of draft horses were no longer able to sell their livestock for farm work, and are left with animals with no commercial value, rendered obsolete by the tractor. Looking for ways to continue breeding these breeds, those in charge of the Boulonnais and Ardennais horse breed registries decided to direct them towards meat production. This new orientation became official in France on July 23, 1976, then published in the Journal officiel de la République française on August 24, 1976, when the cheval de trait (lit. draft horse) officially became the cheval lourd (lit. heavy horse).

=== Positioning ===
In the 1970s and 1980s, the French national stud farms encouraged breeders to convert their draft horses into meat horses, based on the beef cattle model. They introduced a number of measures. Horses suitable for draft were no longer distinguished in breeding competitions. Breeders were encouraged to present horses with heavy musculature, which enabled them to obtain good prices at slaughter. The result was a significant physical transformation of these breeds over a period of twenty years.

According to Marcel Mavré, the breeders were criticized in more ways than one. In 1981, for example, a Belgian breeder of Ardennes horses declared that one doesn't need to be a good breeder to produce meat horses because they're no longer required for draft work. The opening of the Italian market in the 1980s, a major consumer of young horse meat, led to a wave of interest in outdoor meat horse breeding, especially in Brittany, with the local draft breed, the Breton. This breeding model was exported to the Massif Central and the Pyrenees. In 1984, as the gaits of butcher horses were no longer taken into account, the gait test for the Postier Breton (the lighter of two subtypes of Breton) stallions was abolished. The distinction between the two subtypes "Trait Breton" and "Postier Breton" became less obvious in the Breton breed. In 1985, the Hennebont stud sent a huge butcher-type breeding stallion named Oscar to Bannalec in Finistère.

By 1985, French meat horses had become much heavier and fatter than in the past; almost unsuitable for draft work. Breeders of the new meat horse structure derisively nicknamed the previously lighter draft horse structure "bicycles". The construction of the "horse industry", officially named "relaunch" in the 1980s, made it possible to link breeding and marketing of heavy foals on a European scale, on the model of the bull calf. These measures were effective in halting the decline in numbers of draft horse breeds and brought about a new culture among breeders. They also allow the revival of the equestrian agricultural economy in Brittany.

=== Since the 1990s ===
In the 1990s, a movement to bring back draft horses began in France, putting the brakes on its transformation into a specialized meat animal. This left a feeling of failure for those breeders who were late to start breeding, and benefited from agro-environmental premiums for endangered horse breeds from 1992 onwards, particularly those in the Massif Central and the Pyrenees. The identity of the draft horse is changing in European perception, dissociating itself from the slaughter animal. Furthermore, since 2010, the Italian market has been less dynamic, with the price of fuel significantly increasing the cost of exporting live horses. In 2013, horse meat was traded between €1 and €1.50 per kilo by the merchant from the breeder, still mostly to Italy.

In some breeds, such as the Breton and Comtois, the meat horse model predominates among breeders (2015), to the detriment of the draft horse model. Draft horse breeders find it difficult to promote their animals in breeding competitions, as they are considered too thin compared to meat horses, which are objectively overweight and even obese.

== Description ==
The characteristics required in a horse intended for carcass weight are not the same as those of a draft horse, these two orientations being mutually incompatible. According to Bernadette Lizet, fattening meat horses leads to "abnormal deformation of the animal's body". A meat horse is selected on the basis of its growth and fattening capacity, and the maternal qualities of the mares. Heavy foals are generally slaughtered between 6 and 30 months of age. For fattening, they can be fed natural hay (ryegrass) but also silage corn, grain corn, dehydrated beet pulp, concentrated feed and lupin. Some breeders try cross-breeding several breeds (e.g. Breton and Comtois) to obtain better-adapted horse models.

Comparing draft and meat horses

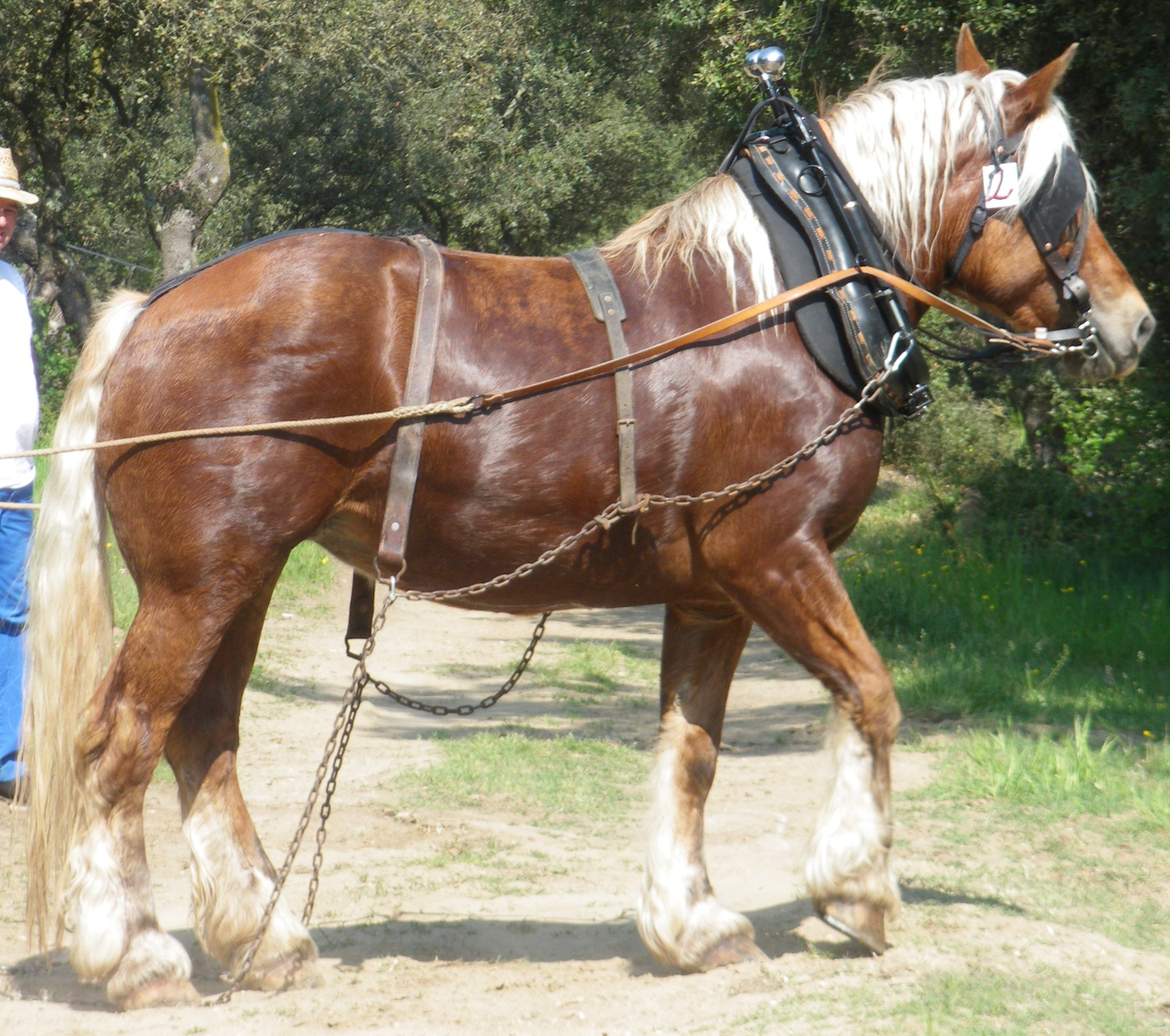
Draft horse (Comtois)

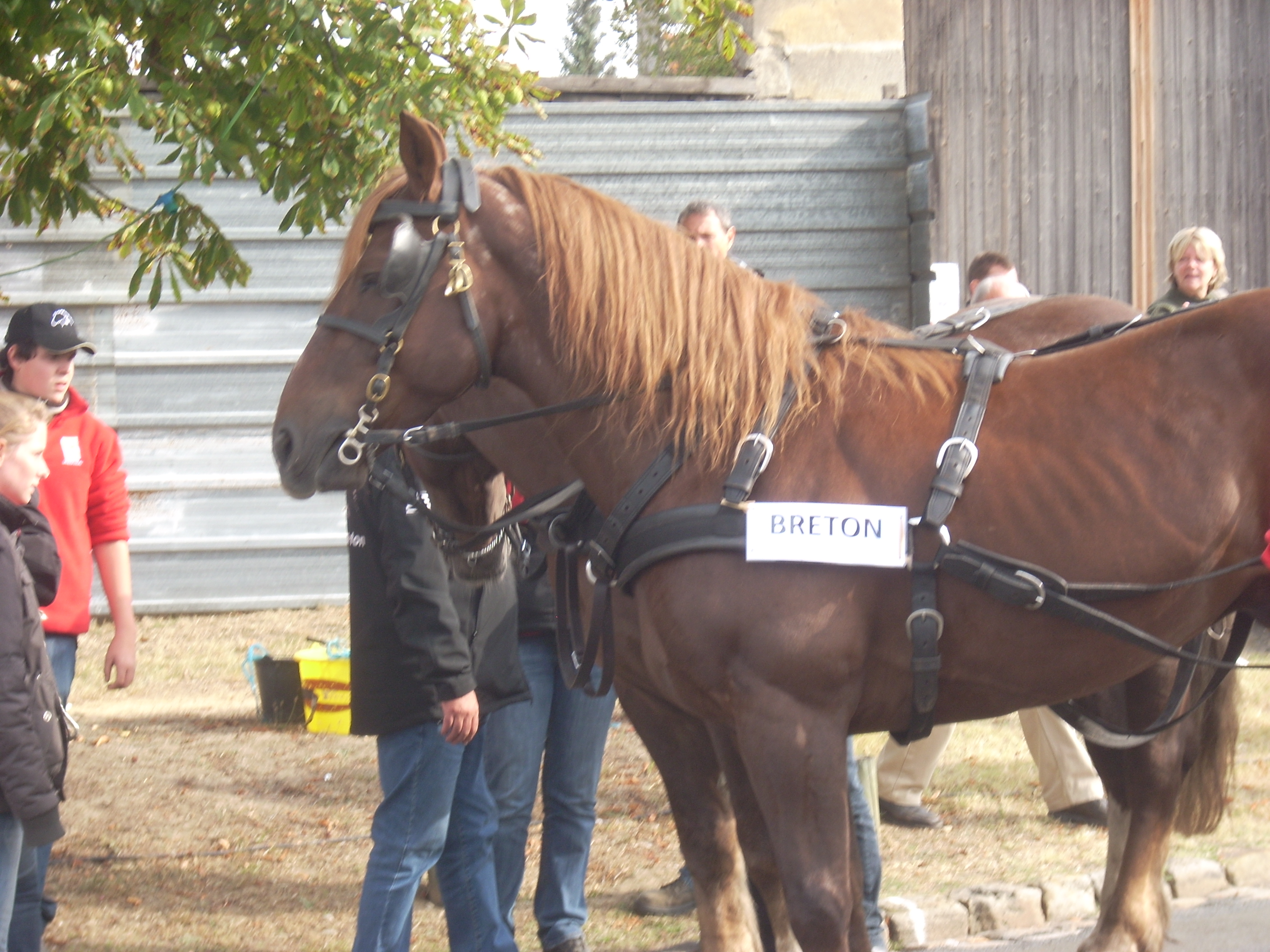
Draft horse (Breton)

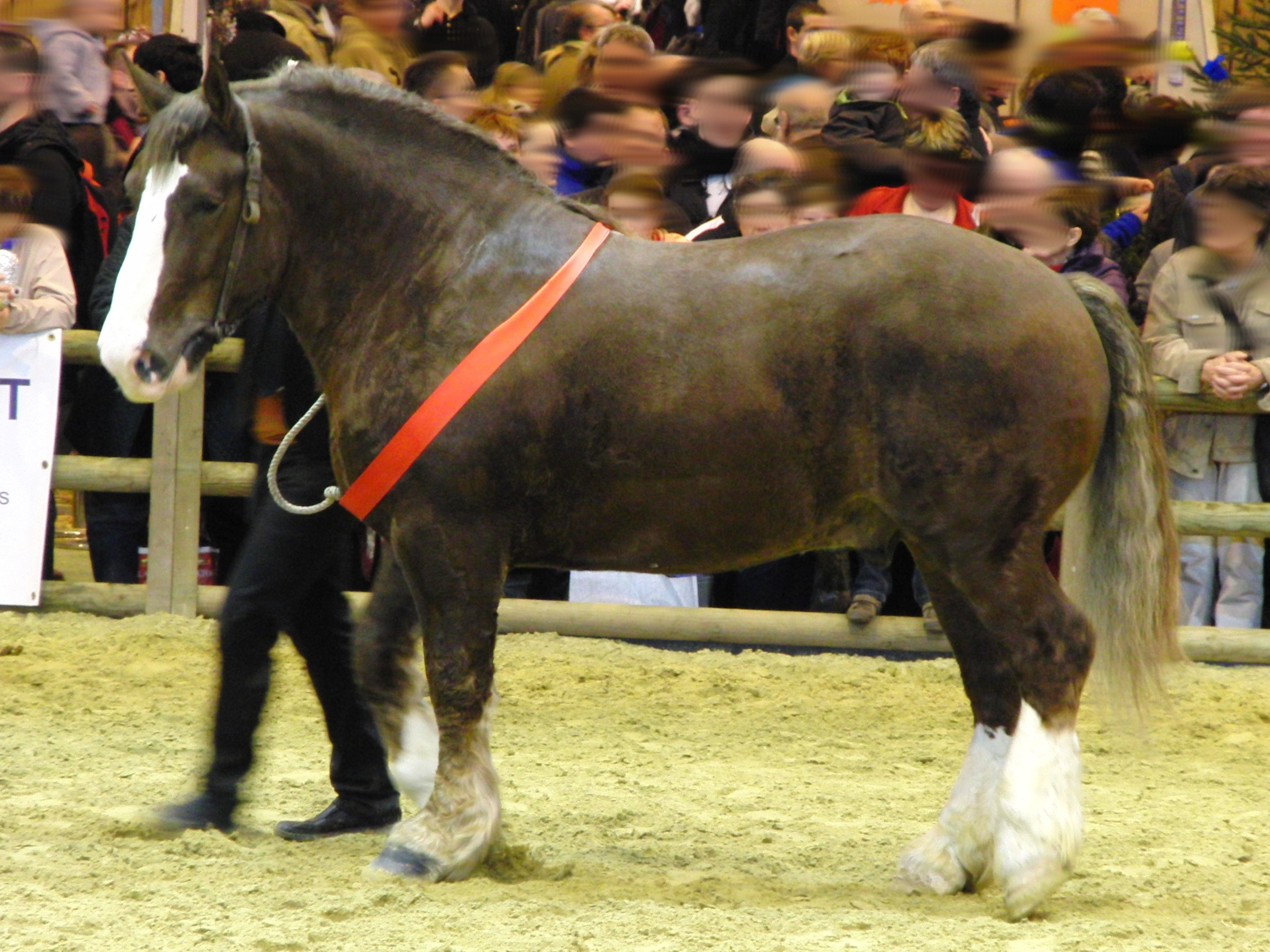
Meat horse (Breton)

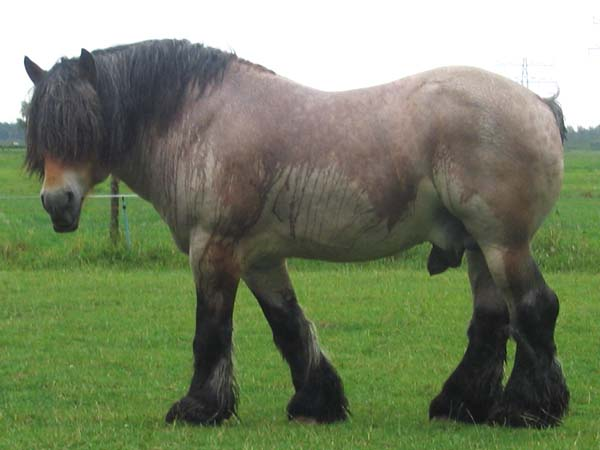
Meat horse (Belgian)

=== Breeding method ===
There are two methods of meat horse breeding: intensive and extensive, with the former favoring earlier slaughter (six months) than the latter. The extensive system makes it possible to make the most of pastures in difficult areas, in addition with cattle and sheep: the horse feeds on the cow's dung, avoiding the need for a woodchipper. Horses are generally grazed, loose-housed or semi-free-range. As part of an extensive system, meat horse breeding enables "the valorization of grass in difficult and declining areas". The relationship between a breeder and his meat horses differs from that between a breeder and draft horses, in that the animal stays much less time on the farm, and does not go through training. Meat foals are generally neither socialized nor handled, as the breeder has little interest in establishing an emotional bond with an animal destined for slaughter.

=== Slaughter ages ===
The French term laiton gras (lit. fat brass) refers to meat foals slaughtered at weaning age, around 6–7 months. They come from large mares and are supplemented with concentrated feed starting at 4 months. In the fall, they are taken with their mothers to new pastures. At slaughter, their live weight is 380 to 420 kg, for a carcass weight of 220 to 240 kg.

The foal can also be slaughtered at around 10–12 months, at a live weight of 450 to 500 kg, for a carcass weight of 270 to 300 kg. The proportion of concentrated feed should be limited to 50% of the horse's consumption to avoid excessive weight gain.

There is also a choice of slaughter between 18 months and two years of age. The foal should be fed moderately in winter, then have unlimited access to pasture in summer. If slaughtered at 18 months, the foal is not castrated, but finished off with a cereal supplement for the last two months of its life. If the foal is too light or has failed to grow sufficiently, it is castrated at around 18 months and "pushed to the trough" during its second winter, to be slaughtered at around 22–24 months, at a live weight of 600 to 650 kg.

Slaughter at around 30 months is generally chosen for foals whose growth has been limited or delayed during the first two years of life, and who are put back out to grass after their second winter. Males are castrated at around 18 months. Females unfit for reproduction may be slaughtered at 30 months. A 30-month-old foal weighs between 670 and 740 kg.

=== Health problems ===
Meat horses are predisposed to certain health problems. Many are overweight or even morbidly obese. The skeleton of a meat horse carries a quarter to a third more weight than that of an ordinary draft horse. Over time, these animals can suffer from joint, leg and kidney problems, as well as lameness. There are also risks of significant complications during foaling, as heavy mares are highly predisposed to post-partum difficulties. They are more likely than others to suffer uterine torsion during foaling. Diaphragmatic hernias can also occur, due to abdominal pressure. If the foal is too big to emerge naturally, farmers resort to calving machines. The risk of foaling problems is increased if the stallion's size is much larger than the mare's, or if the latter is too young (bred in her second year to foal at three, for example).

The existence of muscular problems in meat horses has long been known. Meat horse breeds are particularly affected by polysaccharide storage myopathy. Studies reveal a large number of occurrences of the mutation responsible for type 1 of the disease in the Belgian Draught, Percheron, Comtois, Dutch Draft and Breton breeds, with cases of severe expression of the disease in the Belgian Draught and Percheron. Cases have also been identified in the Norman Cob.

== The market ==
Contrary to popular belief, meat horse breeding is clearly in the minority within the horse meat industry. Most of the red horse meat consumed comes from animals culled from various activities, and not from meat horses bred specifically for market. The meat horse market mainly concerns foal meat. It is particularly active in France, Spain and Italy. Traditionally, young French foals are sent to Italy for fattening. Given the dependence of French breeders on the Italian market, Interbev Equins aims to develop foal meat consumption in France, in order to halt the decline in the number of meat horses.

Geographers Sylvie Brunel and Bénédicte Durand consider the relaunch of breeding for meat in France to be a failure, since its aim was to supply the country with horse meat, but the vast majority of horse meat consumed in France is still imported. Meat horse breeding is therefore heavily dependent on horse meat consumption.

== Meat horse breeds ==
Some breeds are bred almost exclusively for meat, others have a meat orientation and one or more different breeding objectives. The model is not necessarily that of the meat horse.

In Italy, the Haflinger and Sanfratellano breeds provide a large share of the country's horse meat production. Haflingers are slaughtered between 10 and 18 months of age, unless they have health or age problems. In Switzerland, the Franches-Montagnes has never been weighed down for the meat market, but foals slaughtered at around nine months of age are highly prized.

Image	Name	Breeding region	Importance of meat market
	Ardennais	France: Northeastern, and Belgium	Main meat market in France
	Basque Mountain Horse	Spain: Southern Basque Country	Almost exclusively raised for meat
	Boulonnais horse	France: Northern	In 2010, 60% of all Boulonnais horses are destined for slaughter. 80% of these meat horses are exported (mainly to Italy) for fattening prior to slaughter.
	Breton horse	France: Brittany, Massif Central, Pyrenees	Main meat market
	Burguete horse	Spain: Navarre	Main meat market
	Comtois horse	France: Franche-Comté and others	Majority of meat sales (fattening premiums, slaughterhouse opening in Franche-Comté, etc.).
	Hispano-Bretón	Spain: Castile and León	Bred almost exclusively for meat
	Italian Heavy Draft	Italy	Majority of meat sales
	Jaca Navarra	Spain: Navarre	Bred almost exclusively for meat
	New Altai	Russia and Kazakhstan	Majority meat market
	Norman Cob	France: Normandy	Existence of meat lines weighing around 900 kg
	Percheron	France: predominantly	A third of the world's livestock raised for meat in 2009, 70% in France
	Pyrénées catalanes (horse)	Spain: Catalonia	Bred almost exclusively for meat
	Rhenish German Coldblood	Germany	Existing meat market

== Controversy and social acceptance ==
Raising horses for meat is controversial, with many people opposed to the eating of horse meat (hippophagy), and to the idea of breeding horses for this purpose. According to Bernadette Lizet, in France, the meat horse breeders present at the Paris International Agricultural Show have taken to hiding their motivations from Parisian visitors, citing "passion", without ever mentioning the competition criteria for meat breeds, or fattening workshops, or "finishing-meat in Italy". City dwellers are indeed shocked by the existence of such breeding, which they consider barbarism. Jean-Pierre Digard cites the example of a "breeder of splendid meat horses paralyzed by the fear of having to explain that he was raising horses for slaughter", during an interview on a presentation podium at the 2008 Paris International Agricultural Show.

In the Spanish Basque Country, the marketing of locally bred foal meat is based on an elaborate commercial strategy. The language is modernized to lessen the emotional impact created by the idea of consuming horses, speaking instead of "foal meat" (Carne de potro), the emotional impact of the word "foal" not being deemed as strong as that of the word "horse".

Other controversies concern the abuse that some breeders inflict on meat foals, and the awarding of breeding premiums to animals in poor health (obese, even lame) to the detriment of working horses, particularly in the Breton and Comtois breeds.

== See also ==
- Draft horse
- Horse meat
- Horse slaughter
- List of horse breeds
