= Burguete (disambiguation) =

Burguete may refer to:

- Burguete – Auritz, a town and municipality in Navarre, Spain
- Burguete horse, a Spanish breed of horse
- Eduardo Burguete (1962–2023), a Spanish modern pentathlete
- Guillermo Ruiz Burguete (born 1976), a Mexican gridiron football coach
