= Balearic =

Balearic may refer to:

- Of the Balearic Islands
- The Balearic dialect of Catalan
- Balearic horse, a term sometimes used to describe either or both of these horse breeds in the region:
  - Mallorquín
  - Menorquín horse
- Balearic beat, a style of electronic dance music
- Balearic cuisine
