= Hispano-Bretón =

Spanish breed of horse

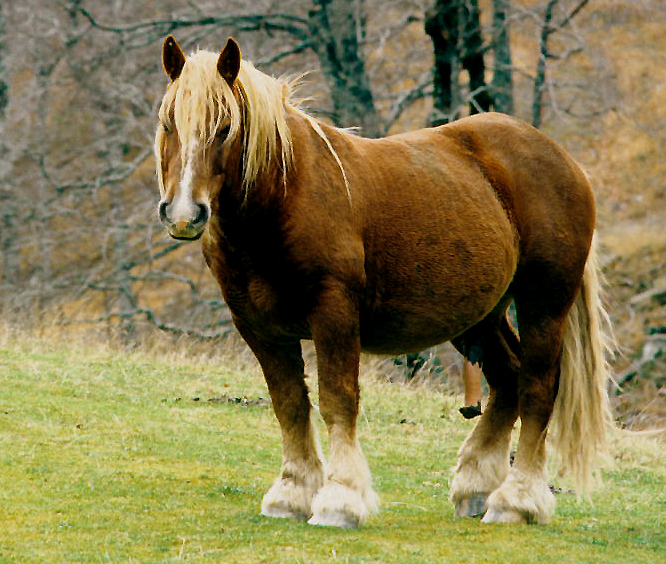
- Near Ansó, province of Huesca, in Aragon

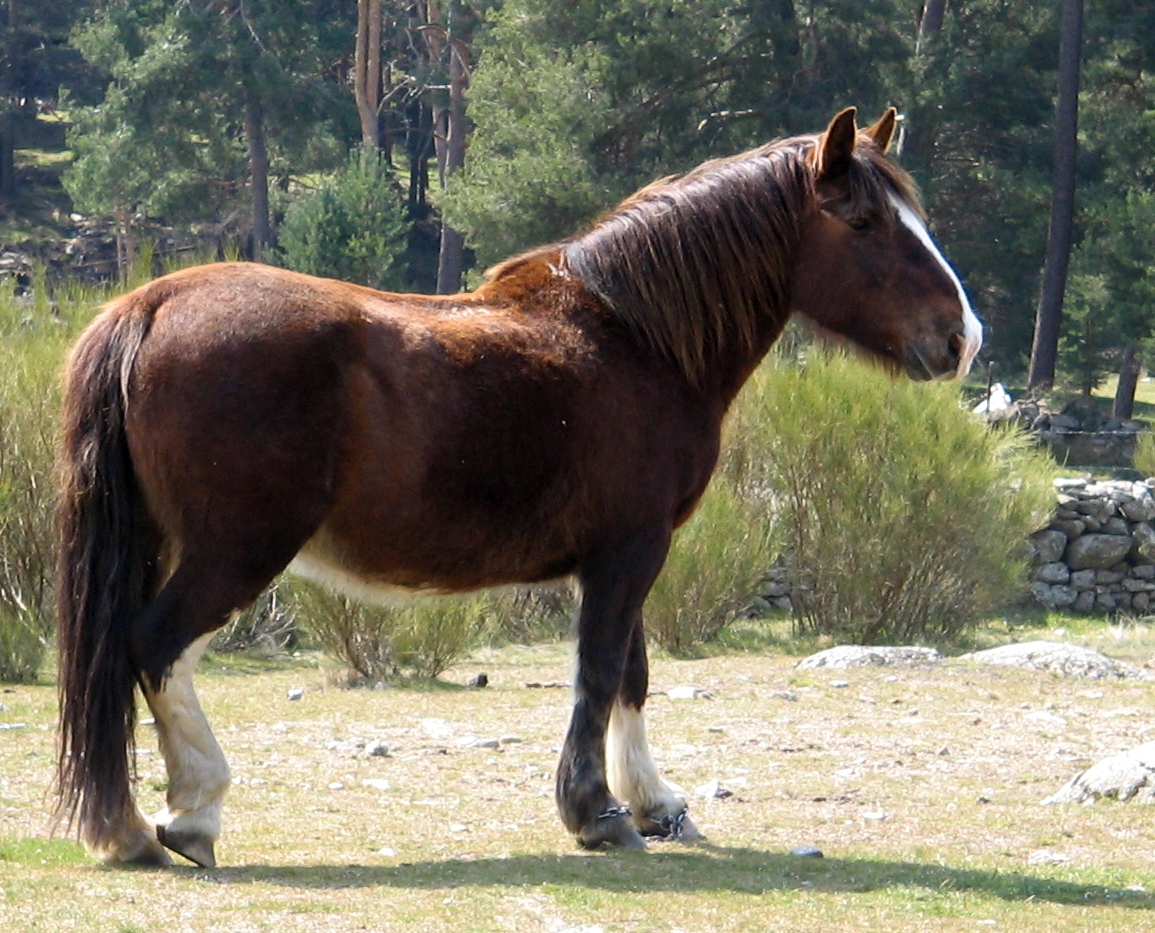
- In the Sierra de Gredos, Ávila, in Castile y León
- Conservation status: FAO (2007): not at risk; DAD-IS (2026): not at risk
- Country of origin: Spain
- Use: horse-meat

Traits
- Weight: Male: 661 kg; Female: 656 kg
- Height: Male: 149 cm; Female: 145 cm

The Hispano-Bretón is a Spanish breed of draught horse, reared principally for horse-meat. It results from cross-breeding of imported Breton horses with native Pura Raza Española stock. It is distributed mainly in two separate areas of northern Spain: Castile and León and parts of neighbouring Cantabria; and the Pyrenees of Catalonia. It is listed in the Catálogo Oficial de Razas de Ganado de España in the group of autochthonous breeds in danger of extinction. It is one of the four heavy horse breeds of Spain which together constitute approximately 90% of all horses slaughtered for horse-meat; the others are the Jaca Navarra, the Burguete and the Pirinenc Català.

== Conservation ==
This breed has a high level of genetic diversity within its gene pool, at least as compared to Pura Raza Española horses. Further analysis via microsatellites showed that, despite that, the breed has experienced inbreeding to a degree, though it seems that they haven't suffered much of a loss of genetic diversity from that, as their allelic richness remains high.

In 2015 the conservation status of the Hispano-Bretón was "endangered".
