= Horse slaughter =

Killing of horses, sometimes for meat

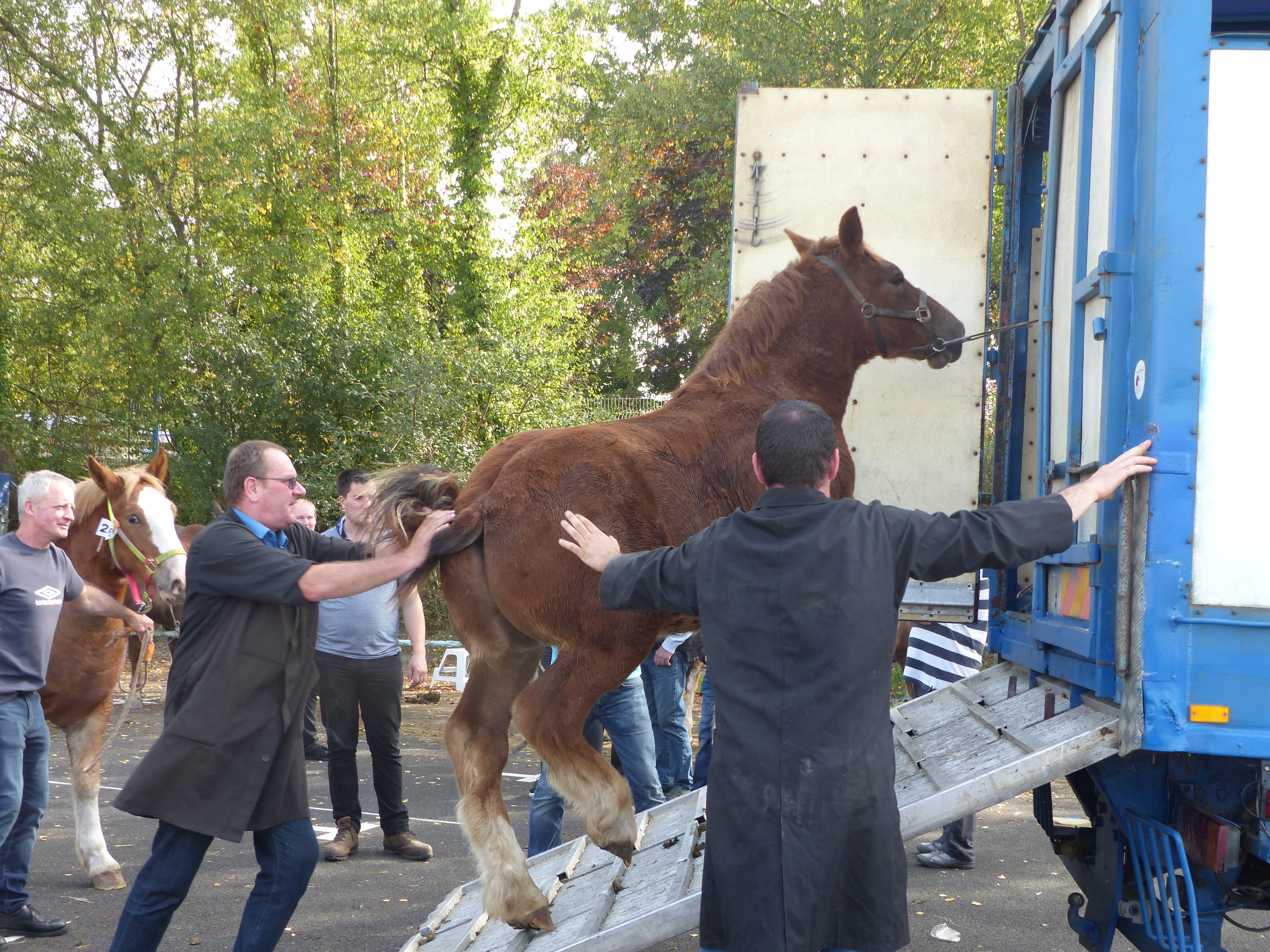
Breton foal being sent to slaughter

Horse slaughter is the practice of slaughtering horses to produce meat for consumption. Humans have long consumed horse meat; the oldest known cave art, the 30,000-year-old paintings in France's Chauvet Cave, depict horses with other wild animals hunted by humans. Equine domestication is believed to have begun to raise horses for human consumption. The practice has become controversial in some parts of the world due to several concerns: whether horses are (or can be) managed humanely in industrial slaughter; whether horses not raised for consumption yield safe meat, and whether it is appropriate to consume what some view as a companion animal.

== Methods ==
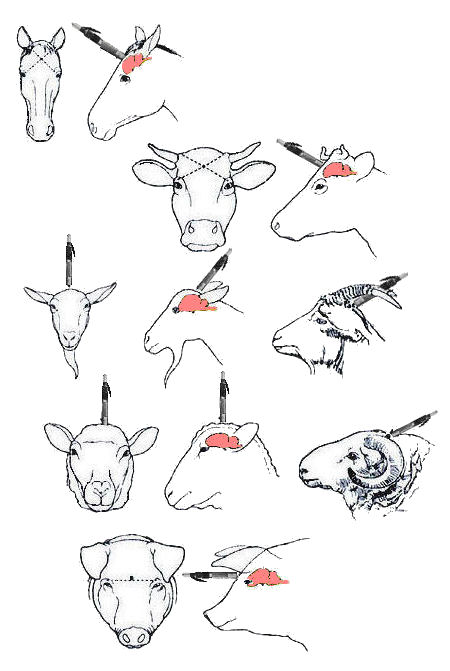
Directions for positioning bolt gun to ensure swift humane death of animal

In most countries where horses are slaughtered for food, they are processed in industrial abattoirs similarly to cattle. Typically, a penetrating captive bolt gun or gunshot is used to render the animal unconscious. The blow (or shot) is intended to kill the horse instantly or stun it, with exsanguination (bleeding out) conducted immediately afterwards to ensure death. Saleable meat is removed from the carcass, with the remains rendered for other commercial uses.

According to equine-welfare advocates, the physiology of the equine cranium is such that neither the penetrating captive bolt gun nor gunshots are reliable means of killing (or stunning) a horse; the animal may be only paralyzed. Unless properly checked for vital signs, a horse may remain conscious and experience pain during skinning and butchering.

== History ==
Some countries, such as Italy, Belgium, the Netherlands and France have maintained a tradition of eating horse meat.

Horse meat also was a traditional protein source during food shortages, such as during World War I and World War II. Before the advent of motorized warfare, campaigns usually resulted in tens of thousands of equine deaths; troops and civilians ate the carcasses, since troop logistics were often unreliable. Troops of Napoleon's Grande Armée killed almost all of their horses during their retreat from Moscow to feed themselves. In his biography, Fifty Years a Veterinary Surgeon, Fredrick Hobday wrote that when his British Army veterinary field hospital arrived in Cremona from France in 1916 it was the subject of a bidding war (won by Milanese horse-meat canners) for salvageable equine carcasses.

During World War II, the less-motorized Axis troops lost thousands of horses in combat and during the unusually-cold Russian winters. Malnourished soldiers consumed the animals, often shooting weaker horses as needed. In his 1840s book, London Labour and the London Poor, Henry Mayhew wrote that horse meat was priced differently in Paris and London.

== Controversy ==
In some countries, horses are perceived as deserving of humane consideration because of their roles as working animals and for sport. This perception may be greater in countries where horses are not bred or raised for food. According to a 2012 UK MORI survey, 50 percent of respondents in France as well as 51 percent in Belgium and 58 percent in Italy thought it acceptable to eat horses.

Several equine and animal-welfare organizations oppose slaughter or support a ban on horse slaughter, but other animal organizations and animal-agriculture groups support the practice. According to livestock-slaughter expert Temple Grandin, horse slaughter can be humane with proper facility design and management.

Stolen horses have been sold to auctions, where they are bought by "kill buyers" and shipped to slaughter. Auctions enable horses to be sold without owner consent, by theft or misappropriation. According to California Livestock and Identification Bureau statistics, the 1998 ban on horse slaughter in California was followed by a 34-percent decrease in horse theft.

=== Long-distance transport ===
One concern about the welfare of horses destined for slaughter is the long distances the horses are sometimes transported to a slaughterhouse. In 2013, 32,841 horses were slaughtered in Italy; of these, 32,316 were transported from other EU states.

== Worldwide ==
Horse-meat production (2009)
Country	Tons per year
Mexico	78,000
Argentina	57,000
Kazakhstan	55,000
Mongolia	38,000
Kyrgyzstan	25,000
United States	25,000
Australia	24,000
Brazil	21,000
Canada	18,000
Poland	18,000
Italy	16,000*
Romania	14,000
Chile	10,000
France	7,500
Uruguay	8,000
Senegal	9,500
Colombia	6,000
Spain	5,000*
* Includes donkeys

== Ireland ==
Horses slaughtered in Ireland, by year
Year	Horses
2012	24,362
2013	10,711
2014	7,602
2015	6,033
2016	7,618
2017	7,748
2018	6,573

In 2019, Ireland's Department of Agriculture released figures on the numbers of horses slaughtered at government-approved abattoirs for human consumption. The numbers peaked in 2012, but significantly decreased the following year due to stricter regulations put in place after the 2013 horse meat scandal in Europe.

In 2024, an RTÉ Investigates program, Horses – Making a Killing which went undercover inside an Irish horse slaughterhouse, found widescale animal abuses and incidents of workers purposely misidentifying animals. Animals were shown to have identifying markings covered with spray paint and new microchips inserted prior to slaughter. Journalists from the Investigates program examined the details of 2,400 horses slaughtered at Shannonside Foods Ltd between January 1, 2023 and March 1, 2024. They found that 71% of the slaughtered animals were thoroughbreds bred for the racing industry, over 400 of which had racing careers, and the rest were sport or leisure horses. The documentary led to investigations by Europol, the European Commission and the Irish Department of Agriculture. Meat from the abattoir featured in the documentary was later destroyed over food safety concerns.

== United States ==
=== Food safety ===
Horses in the United States are not bred or raised for meat. Nearly all equine medications and treatments are labeled, "Not for horses intended for human consumption." Meat from American horses raises a number of potential health concerns, primarily due to the routine use of medications banned in food animals and a lack of tracking of such use. Unlike livestock raised for food (where all potential medications are tested for withdrawal times and vigilantly tracked), there is no way to guarantee which medications have been used in a particular horse. During November and December 2010 inspections of EU-regulated plants in Mexico which slaughtered horses for human consumption, the European Commission Food and Veterinary Office (FVO) uncovered violations. Most American horses destined for slaughter are transported to EU-regulated plants in Mexico and Canada. Horses, unlike traditional food animals in the United States, are not raised (or medicated) with the intent of becoming human food. Because American horses are not intended for the human food chain, they often receive medications banned by the Food and Drug Administration for use in food animals. Concern also exists that horse meat will be mixed with ground-beef products and sold improperly labeled in the US, as occurred during the European 2013 horse meat scandal.

Before 2007, three major equine slaughterhouses operated in the United States: Dallas Crown in Kaufman, Texas; Beltex Corporation in Fort Worth, Texas; and Cavel International in DeKalb, Illinois. All were Belgian-owned, with Multimeat also having French and Dutch ownership; Velda owned Cavel, Multimeat owned Beltex and Chevideco owned Dallas Crown. The slaughterhouses exported about $42 million in horse meat annually, with most going overseas. About 10 percent of their output was sold to zoos to feed their carnivores, and 90 percent was shipped to Europe and Asia for human consumption. Although the House of Representatives voted overwhelmingly to end horse slaughter in 2006, the bill never came to a vote before the Senate. The two Texas horse-slaughter plants were ordered closed in 2007, after protracted battles with local municipalities who objected to their financial drain on the municipalities (no tax revenue), ditches of blood, dismembered foals and noxious odors in residential neighborhoods. Later that year, the Cavel plant was closed after local community action.

The director of equine protection of the Humane Society of the United States reported seizing large numbers of horses, and equine-rescue facilities were taking in more horses than ever despite a record number of horses shipped to Canada and Mexico for slaughter. The equine market was saturated by increased breeding.

In March 2012, Wyoming state Representative Sue Wallis proposed a new horse-meat processing plant in Missouri or Arkansas. According to Wallis, she had six million dollars to invest and support from Belgian horse-meat buyers. In May Wallis sought local investors in Wyoming to help finance the plant, which she said could cost between two and six million dollars and would process up to 200 horses a day for sale abroad and to ethnic markets in the US. In 2013 the Obama Administration proposed the removal of funding for USDA inspection of horse-slaughter plants in the 2014 fiscal year, which would prevent horse slaughter.

=== Federal bills ===
Slaughterhouses in the United States cannot legally operate without inspection by the U.S. Department of Agriculture, a federal agency. States are able to individually ban the slaughter of horses without federal approval, but the USDA operates through a federally-funded budget by the President and the Senate and House Appropriations Committees. Amending the budget to prohibit funding to the USDA for inspecting slaughterhouses processing horse meat as a means to block horse slaughter in the US at a federal level was introduced as a policy goal starting in 2005. Using the budget to block inspection means that continuation of the ban is subject to review each year, and did not ensure that changes could not be made by future congresses.

H.R. 2744-45 Sec 794, The Agriculture, Rural Development, Food and Drug Administration and Related Agencies Appropriations Act 2005-2006 was successfully passed to end funding for inspection, effectively ending the processing of horse meat in the US until a future government was willing to reinstate. The USDA resisted by creating a loophole with regulation CFR 352.19 which allowed existing slaughterhouses to pay inspectors directly instead of the agency relying on federal funding. This loophole was closed for Illinois and Texas, the states still engaging in horse slaughter, through a series of court rulings in 2007.

In 2012, the Agriculture, Rural Development, Food and Drug Administration, and Related Agencies Appropriations Act, 2013 excluded the wording necessary to continue blocking federal funds for USDA inspection of slaughterhouses processing horse meat In June 2013 a New Mexico meat plant fulfilled the requirements for USDA inspection of their horse slaughter facility and reopened the horse slaughter debate in congress. In 2014 President Obama proposed and passed a budget that once again included language to prohibit horse slaughter in the U.S by defunding federal inspection budget.

Efforts have been made to create a federal law ending the slaughter of American horses for human consumption. On September 8, 2006, the House of Representatives passed a bill which would have made killing or selling American horses for human consumption illegal in the United States; however, it was not passed by the Senate.

Two bills, H.R. 503 in the House and S. 1915 in the Senate, were introduced in the 109th Congress to prevent the slaughter of horses for human consumption. H.R. 503 was passed by the House on September 7, 2006, by a recorded vote of 263–146. S. 1915 was read twice, referred to committee and not voted on. Both bills died at the end of the 109th Congress, and were reintroduced in the 110th Congress on January 17, 2007, as H.R. 503 and S. 311. S. 311 was reported out but not taken up for a vote. The bills were not reintroduced in the 111th Congress. Two bills were introduced in the 112th Congress: H.R. 2966 and S. 1176, the American Horse Slaughter Prevention Act of 2011. The latter was introduced on July 9, 2011, by Senators Mary Landrieu (D-LA) and Lindsey Graham (R-SC) to amend the Horse Protection Act of 1970 (15 U.S.C. ch. 44) to prohibit the shipping, transporting, moving, delivering, receiving, possessing, purchasing, selling, or donation of horses and other equines to be slaughtered for human consumption.

A new iteration of the SAFE Act was introduced in 2021 as H.R. 3355 to the U.S. House of Representatives on February 19, 2021, by Rep. Janice Schakowsky (D-IL) but as of this date has not been brought to the floor for a vote

=== Transport of horses for slaughter ===
Although the Department of Transportation has officers at enforcement points to ensure the proper transportation of horses, it has no jurisdiction beyond transportation. Horses that "are severely lame or disabled are not accepted at the plants".

A 1998 USDA Animal and Plant Health Inspection Service survey to determine welfare problems during equine transport to slaughter found severe problems in 7.7 percent of the transported horses; most arose from owner neglect or abuse, rather than transportation. The report recommended fining individuals who transport horses unfit for travel. However, despite those recommendations, in an April 2011 report on equine transport violations, of 458 violators and 280 cases reported since February 1, 2002, 51 violators were fined a total of $781,350. The highest fines imposed were $230,000.00 on Charles Carter of Colorado, $162,000 on Leroy Baker of Ohio and $77,825 on Bill Richardson of Texas. A 2007–2015 investigation by Animals' Angels found overcrowded pens, aggression, rough handling, transport with no rest, untreated injuries and no water or food for more than the 28 hours required by law. On February 22, 2007, Representative Robert Molaro introduced HB1711 to the Illinois General Assembly to prohibit the transport of horses into the state for the sole purpose of slaughter for human consumption.

US Department of Agriculture regulations govern the transportation of horses, but the USDA has said that it does not have the resources for enforcement. In 2009, a bill which would have prohibited the interstate transport of live horses in double-deck horse trailers passed out of committee in the House of Representatives and was placed on the Union Calendar. The bill died at the end of the 111th Congress.

On November 18, 2011, the ban on the slaughter of horses for meat was lifted as part of the Consolidated and Further Continuing Appropriations Act for Fiscal Year 2012. However, it was reestablished by Congress on January 14, 2014, with the passage of the Fiscal Year 2014 Omnibus Appropriations Act.

On March 12, 2013, Senators Landrieu and Graham introduced S. 541, the Safeguard American Food Exports (SAFE) Act of 2013. The SAFE Act amends the Federal Food, Drug, and Cosmetic Act to deem equine (horses and other members of the family Equidae) parts an unsafe food additive or animal drug. The SAFE Act also prohibits the knowing sale or transport of equines (or equine parts) in interstate or foreign commerce for human consumption. An identical version of the bill, H.R. 1094, was introduced in the House of Representatives by Representatives Patrick Meehan (R-PA) and Jan Schakowsky (D-IL).

=== Texas judicial ruling 2007 ===
On January 19, 2007, the 5th U.S. Circuit Court of Appeals in New Orleans overturned a lower court's 2006 ruling that a 1949 Texas law banning horse slaughter for the purpose of selling the meat for food was invalid because it had been repealed by another statute and was preempted by federal law. A panel of three 5th Circuit judges disagreed, saying that the Texas law still stood and was enforceable. On March 6, 2007, without comment or dissent, the 19 judges of the 5th Circuit rejected a petition by three foreign-owned slaughter plants seeking a full court review of the panel's January 19 decision.

== United Kingdom ==
In the European 2013 horse meat scandal, foods advertised as containing beef were found to contain undeclared or improperly declared horse meat—100 percent of the meat content, in some cases. A smaller number of products also contained other undeclared meats, such as pork. The issue came to light on January 15, 2013, when it was reported that equine DNA had been discovered in frozen beefburgers sold at several Irish and British supermarkets.

== See also ==
- Horse meat – Consumable meat from horses
- Meat horse – Horses bred specifically for horse meat
