= Pirinenc Català =

Spanish breed of horse

- Conservation status: FAO (2007): not listed; DAD-IS (2025): at risk/vulnerable
- Other names: Catalan: Cavall Pirinenc Català
- Country of origin: Spain
- Distribution: Catalonia

Traits
- Weight: 650–750 kg
- Height: 145–160 cm

The Pirinenc Català or Cavall Pirinenc Català is a Spanish breed of heavy horse in the autonomous community of Catalonia in north-eastern Spain. It is reared almost exclusively for horse-meat, but may also be used for draught work.

The horses are rustic and well adapted to mountain weather and terrain, and are managed extensively with only minimal human intervention, grazing year-round on the pastures of the Pre-Pyrenees and Pyrenees of Catalonia.

== History ==
The Pirinenc Català derives from heavy horses imported to Catalonia from the early twentieth century onwards; many of these were from France, and included animals of the Ardennes, Boulonnais, Breton, Comtois, Percheron and Poitevin breeds. These were cross-bred with local horses, among them some remaining stock of the old Catalan – an Iberian breed of riding horse with similarities to the Mallorquín, Menorquín, Lusitano and Pura Raza Española – which was thus absorbed into the heavy horse population and has been considered extinct since the first third of the twentieth century.

A breed standard was published by the Generalitat de Catalunya in 2008 and a stud-book was established. In 2011 a federation of breeders' associations – the Federació d'Associacions de Criadors de Cavall Pirinenc Català – received approval to manage it; a breeding programme was approved in 2021.

In 2023 the total number of the horses was 4925, including 4338 mares and 587 stallions, in the hands of 391 breeders; all were in Catalonia. In 2025 the conservation status of the breed was listed by the Food and Agriculture Organization of the United Nations as "at risk/endangered".

== Characteristics ==
The horses derive from a wide variety of origins and so form a highly variable population. In general, they share three principal characteristics: they are heavily built or massive; they are long in the body but not tall; and they have a concave facial profile. The coat may be of any colour, but is usually some shade of chestnut; the principal colours listed in the breed standard are chestnut, bay and black; roan and grey are permitted, but not prioritised. Height at the withers is between 145 and 160 cm, and body weights are usually some 650 to 750 kg.

Mares are fertile and are quick to reach sexual maturity; they give birth easily and display good maternal qualities.

== Use ==
The Pirinenc Català is generally bred only for horse-meat; foals are milk-fed for the first six months, when they are taken from the dam and sold to be fattened for slaughter, which is usually at about a year old.

A few are sold for draught work, usually in southern Catalonia or in Valencia.
