= Spanish Sport Horse =

Spanish breed of horse

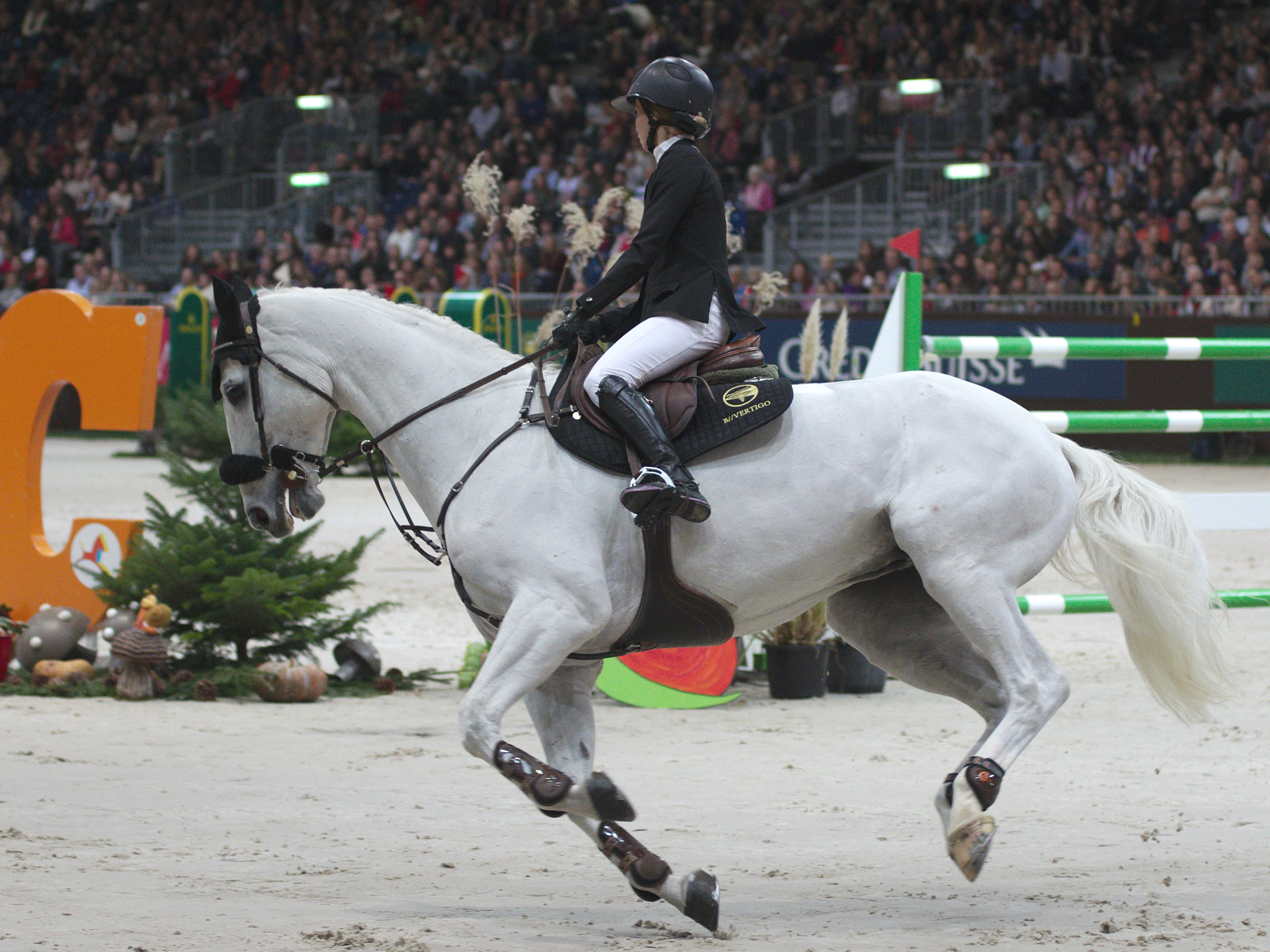
- Fardon and Anna-Julia Kontio, Geneva 2014

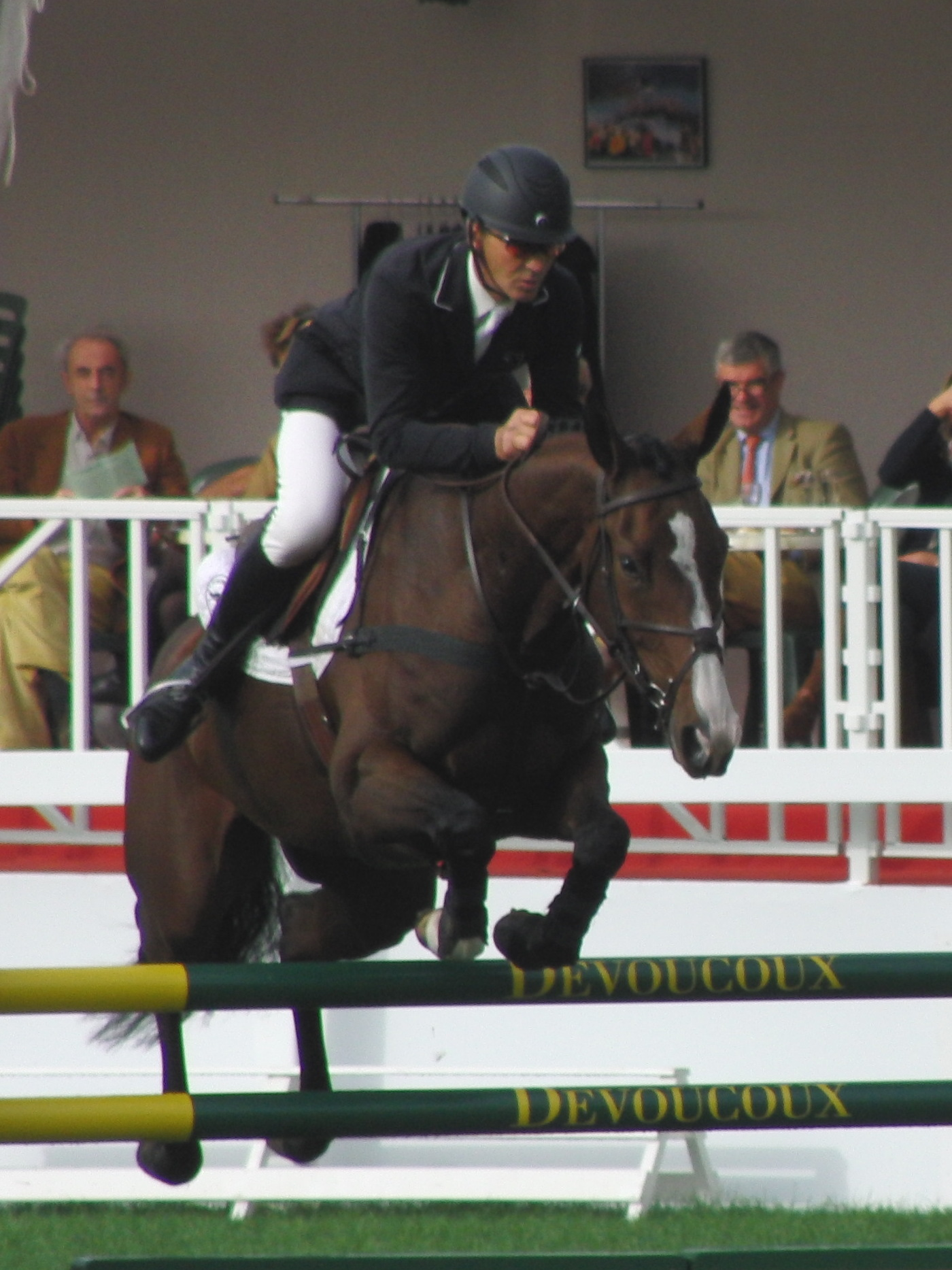
- Jet Set and Andrew Nicholson, Mondial du Lion, 2013
- Conservation status: FAO (2007): not listed; DAD-IS (2026): not at risk
- Other names: Caballo de Deporte Español
- Country of origin: Spain
- Distribution: all provinces of Spain
- Use: show-jumping; classical dressage; cross-country; three-day event; endurance; harness racing

Traits
- Weight: Male: average 550 kg; Female: average 450 kg
- Height: Male: average 168 cm; Female: average 164 cm
- Colour: any

The Spanish Sport Horse or Caballo de Deporte Español is the Spanish national breed of warmblood sport horse. It is bred particularly for competitive performance in show-jumping, but is also used for dressage, cross-country, three-day eventing, endurance and harness racing. It is widely distributed and is present in every province of Spain.

== History ==
Until the last years of the twentieth century sport horses not eligible for registration in an approved stud-book were documented by the Jefatura de Cría Caballar – the military agency responsible for horse breeding – as cross-breeds, and so were not recognised by the World Breeding Federation for Sport Horses and were not eligible to participate in international competitions. A breed association – the Asociación de Criadores de Caballos de Saltos – was established in Seville in 1992, and later changed is name to the Asociación Nacional de Criadores del Caballo de Deporte Español. In 1999 the association successfully petitioned the Cria Caballar to establish a register for these horses; in 2002 this became a genealogical stud-book approved by the Ministerio de Agricultura, Alimentación y Medio Ambiente, as the Spanish ministry of agriculture was then called.

The stud-book allows registration of horses of the Spanish Hispano-Arabe, Mallorquí, Menorquí, Pura Raza Española and Spanish Trotter breeds; of the international Anglo-Arab, Arab and Thoroughbred breeds; of any horse registered in a stud-book recognised by the World Breeding Federation for Sport Horses (with the exception of pony and draught horse breeds); and of cross-breeds deriving from any combination of these. In 2011 the principal influences on the breed were identified as the Hanoverian, Holsteiner, Oldenburger, Trakehner and Westphalian sport horses of Germany.

In 2023 there were a total of 22884 horses registered, with mares and males in nearly equal numbers; these were kept by 4546 breeders, an average of approximately 5 horses each.

== Characteristics ==
There is no breed standard for the Caballo de Deporte, which may be of any colour. Average heights at the withers are about 164 cm for mares and 168 cm for stallions and geldings; the corresponding average body weights are approximately 450 kg and 550 kg respectively.

The horses reach sexual maturity at three years old, and on average mares foal for the first time at the age of four. The average age of approved breeding stallions is 13, and of mares 12.

== Use ==
It is bred particularly for competitive performance in show-jumping, but is also used for classical dressage, cross-country, three-day eventing, endurance and harness racing.
