= Retuertas =

Spanish breed of horse

- Conservation status: FAO (2007): not listed; DAD-IS (2022): unknown
- Other names: Caballo de las Retuertas; Caballo de las Retuertas de Doñana
- Country of origin: Spain
- Distribution: Province of Huelva; Province of Salamanca

Notes
- feral population

The Retuertas or Caballo de las Retuertas is a Spanish breed of horse indigenous to Andalusia. It is found only in the Doñana National Park in the provinces of Huelva and Sevilla, with a conservation herd in the Campanarios de Azaba Biological Reserve in Espeja (Salamanca Province) a part of which is the research reserve of the Consejo Superior de Investigaciones Científicas, the Spanish National Research Council.

In 2016 it was added to the list of domestic animal breeds with national government recognition.
