= Monchino =

Spanish breed of horse

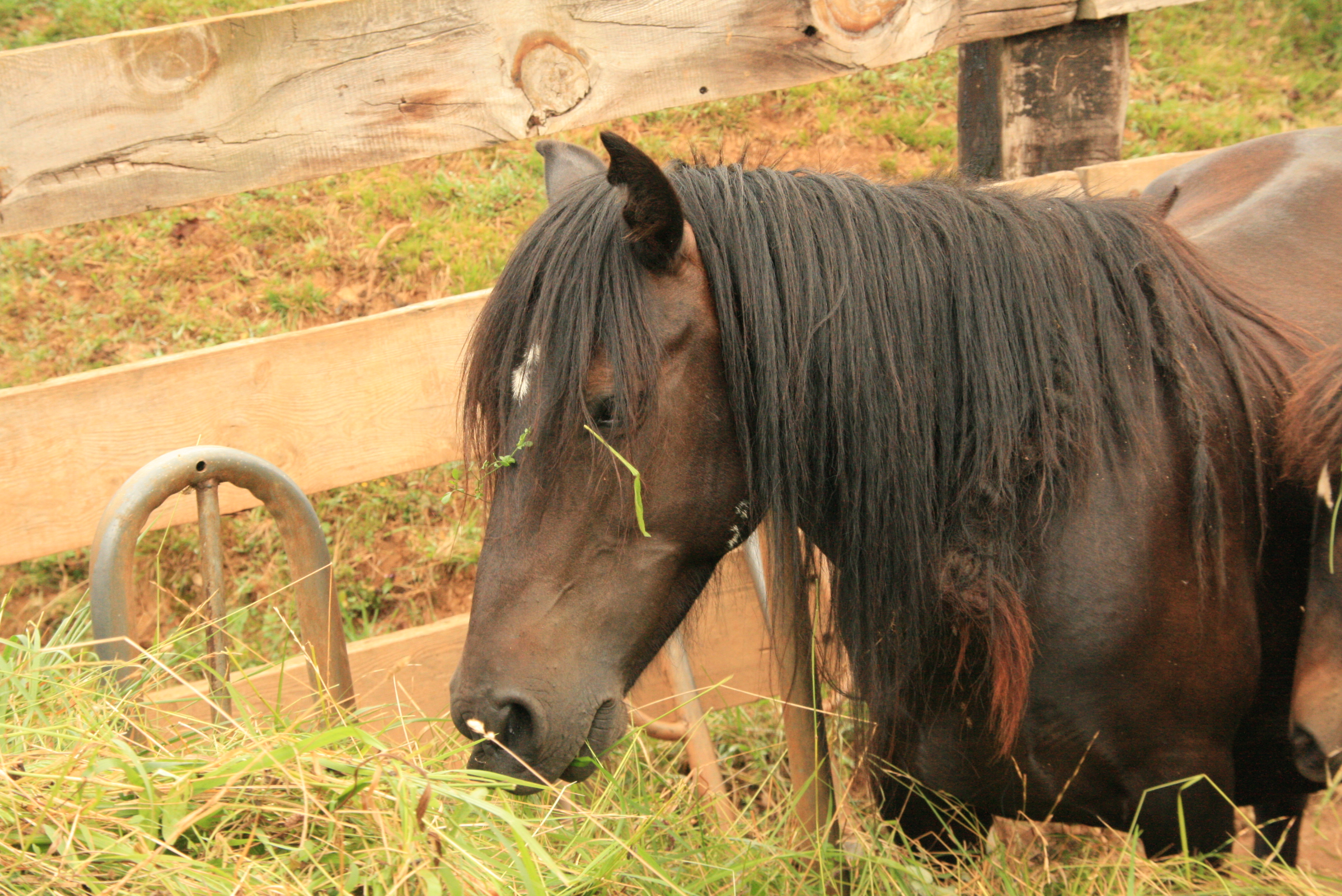
- Monchinu horse.
- Other names: Monchinu
- Country of origin: Cantabria, Spain

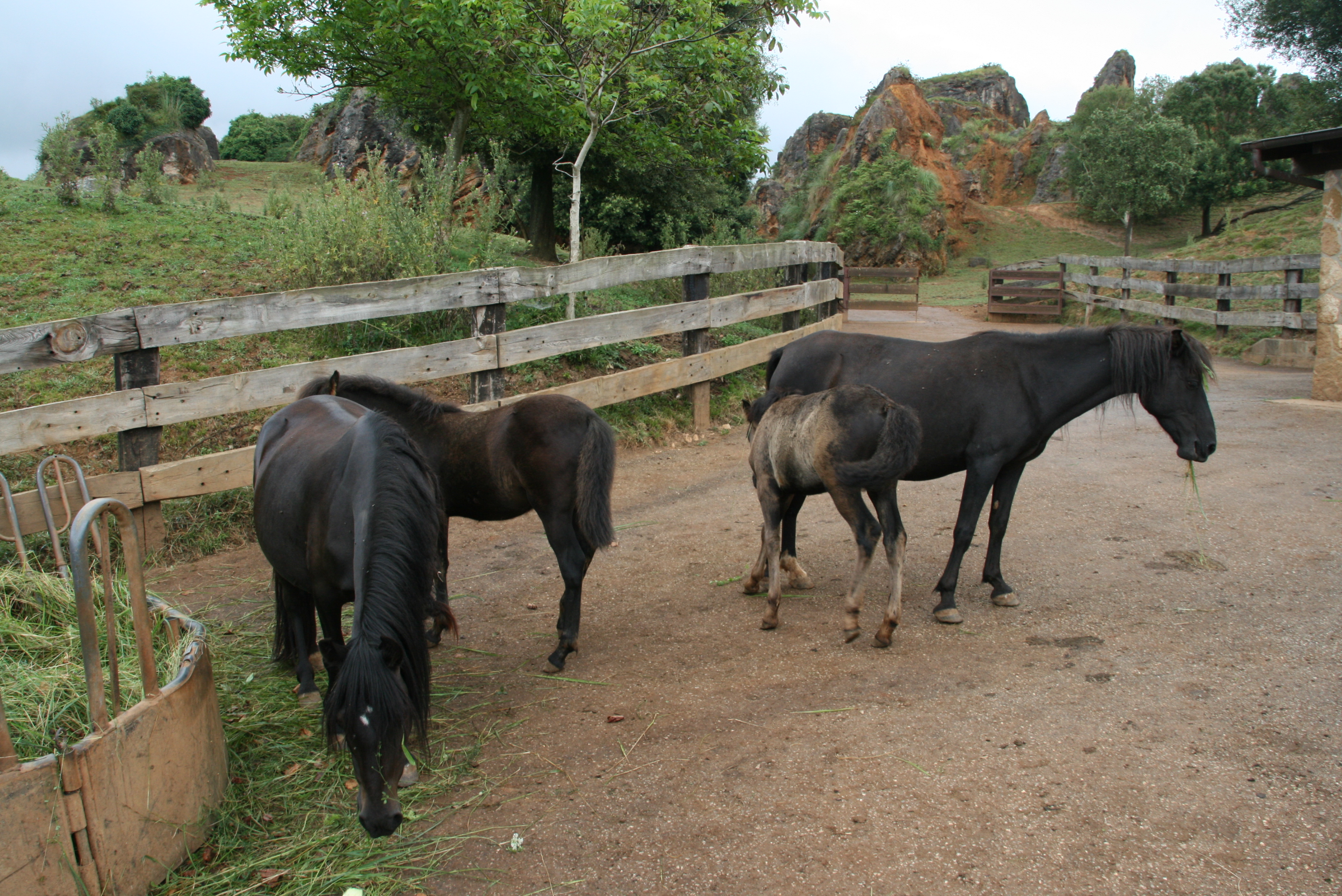
Monchinu herd in Cabárceno Natural Park, Cantabria.

The Monchino (Spanish: [monˈtʃino]) or Monchinu (Cantabrian: [monˈtʃinu]) is a breed of horse indigenous to the Valle de Guriezo in the Cantabria region of northern Spain, and also extending into neighbouring Biscay province. It is listed in the Official Catalogue of Livestock Breeds of Spain (Catálogo Oficial de Razas de Ganado de España) in the group of autochthonous breeds in danger of extinction. The word monchinu means highlander, from the mountains, in Cantabrian.

== See also ==
- Iberian horse
