= Burguete horse =

Spanish breed of horse

Burguete
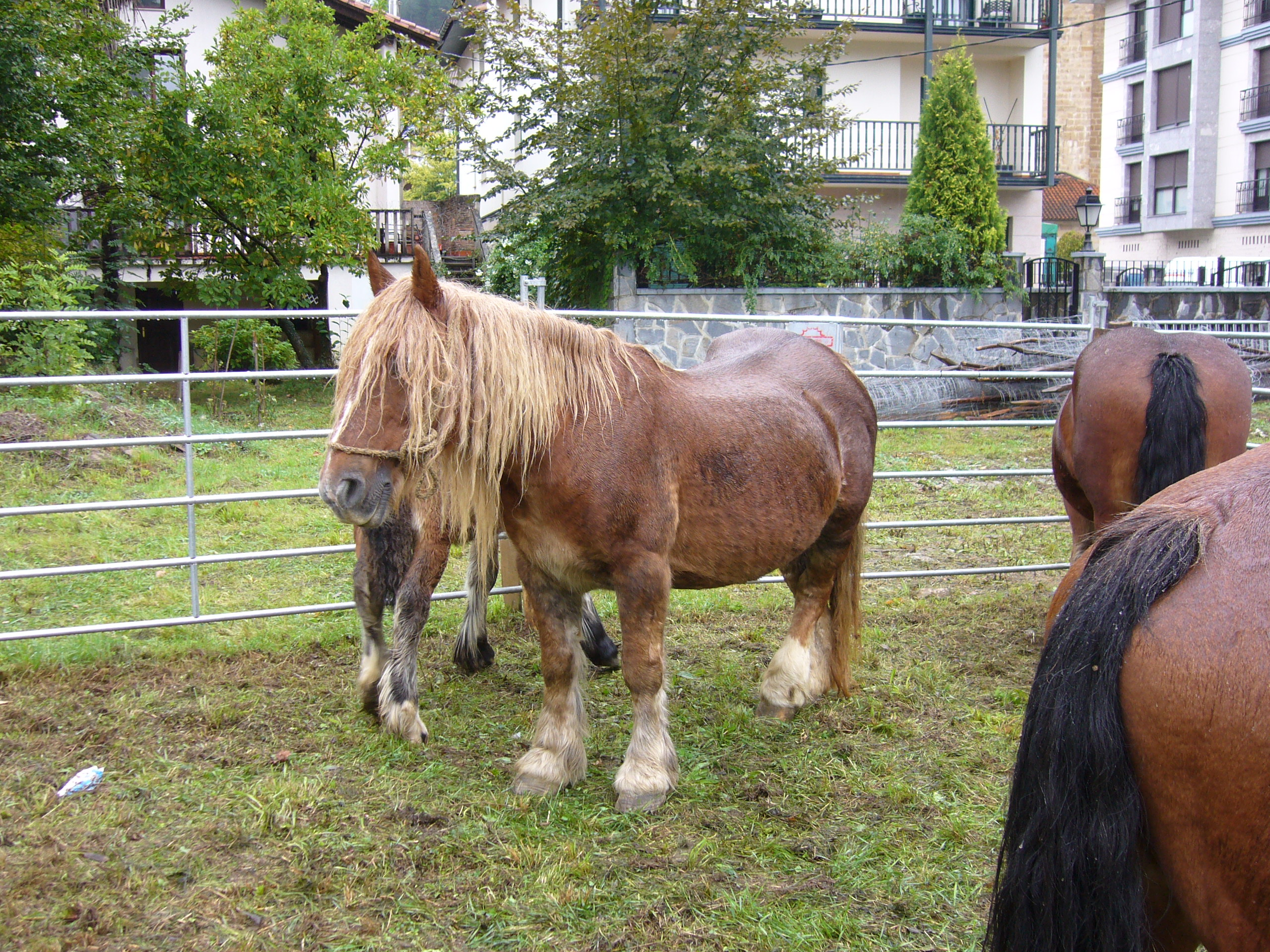
- Conservation status: FAO (2007): not at risk; DAD-IS (2023): at risk/vulnerable
- Other names: Basque: Aurizko zaldia; Spanish: Caballo Burguete; Spanish: Caballo de Raza Burguete
- Country of origin: Spain
- Use: horsemeat; conservation grazing; draught work

Traits
- Colour: bay or chestnut

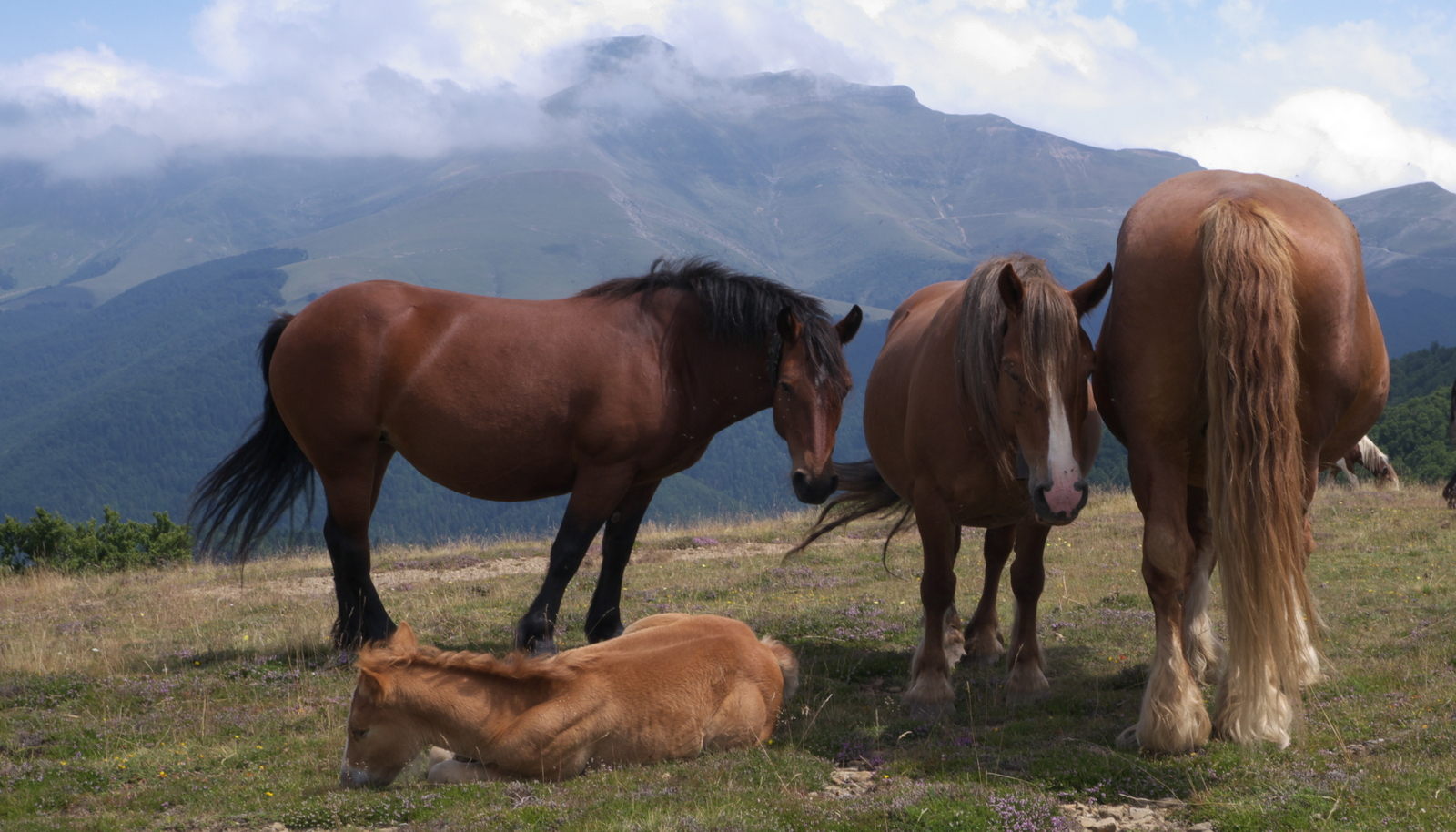
In Ochagavía, Navarre

The Burguete (Spanish: Caballo Burguete or Caballo de Raza Burguete, Basque: Aurizko zaldia) is a Spanish breed of horse from the autonomous community of Navarre in north-eastern Spain. It is listed in the Catálogo Oficial de Razas de Ganado de España in the group of autochthonous breeds in danger of extinction. It is reared principally for horsemeat. The name, both in Basque and in Spanish, is derived from that of the municipio of Burguete – Auritz.

It is one of four Basque breeds of horse, the others being the Jaca Navarra, the Pottoka and the Euskal Herriko Mendiko Zaldia or Basque Mountain Horse.

== History ==
The Burguete derives from cross-breeding of indigenous Basque mares of Jaca Navarra type with foreign stallions of the Trait Breton, Postier Breton and Percheron breeds, and later with Ardennes and Comtois stock. It received recognition from the national government of Spain in 1979, when it was included in the Catálogo Oficial de Razas de Ganado de España. The name of the breed, both in Basque and in Spanish, is derived from that of the municipio of Burguete – Auritz in northeastern Navarre.

A breeders' association, the Asociación de Criadores de Raza Equina Burguete de Navarra, was established in 1998, and in 1999 was recognised by the Government of Navarre and authorised to keep the stud-book for the breed.

The Burguete is distributed only in Navarre. In north-eastern Navarre, its area of origin, it is associated with the municipios of Auritz/Burguete and Isaba, as well as the settlements of Villanueva de Arce/Hiriberri-Artzibar in the municipio of Arce and Arrieta/Artzibar in the municipio of Auñamendi. Its range later expanded into north-western Navarre, where it is associated with the comarca of Barranca, with the municipio of Larráun in the comarca of Norte de Aralar, and with the Améscoas – the municipio of Améscoa Baja in the comarca of Estella Oriental and the former administrative region of Améscoa Alta to the north.

In 2019 there were 1532 breeding mares and 307 active stallions; At the end of 2022 the total population numbered 7317 head, consisting of 6064 mares and 1317 stallions; the registered breeding stock numbered 365 stallions and 4001 mares, for a total of 4366. In 2023 the conservation status of the breed was reported to DAD-IS as "at risk/vulnerable".

== Characteristics ==
The Burguete is solidly built and somewhat brachymorphic – the length of the body is rather more than the height at the withers. The coat is either bay or chestnut.

== Use ==
It is reared principally for horsemeat; for this purpose, mares are sometimes put to Comtois or Auxois stallions, rather than those of the Burguete breed.

It may be used for draught work, and in northern Navarre is used also for conservation grazing.
