= Basque Mountain Horse =

Spanish breed of horse

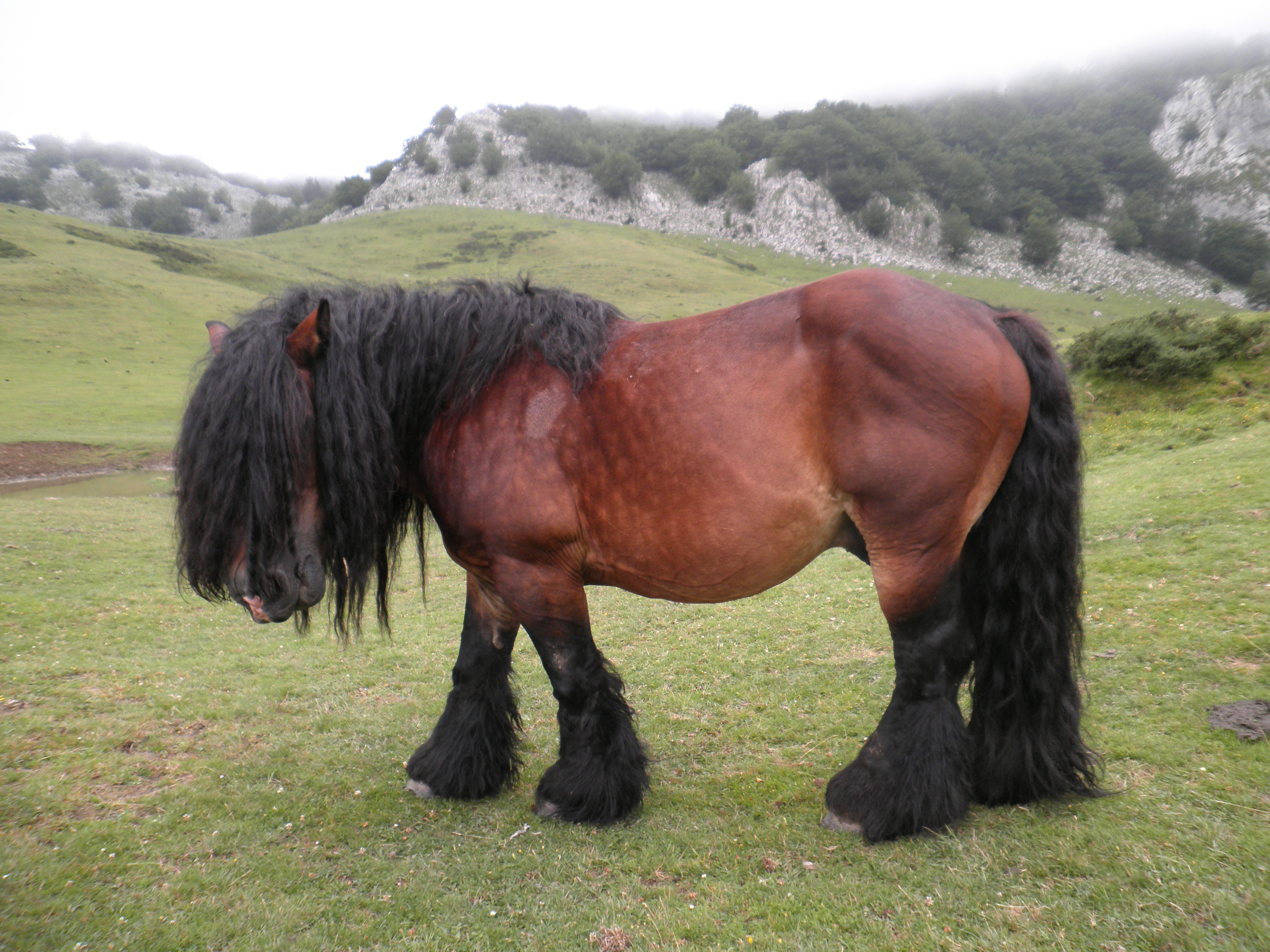
- On Gorbeia
- Conservation status: FAO (2007): endangered; DAD-IS (2025): at risk/vulnerable
- Other names: Basque: Euskal Herriko Mendiko Zaldia; Spanish: Caballo de Monte del País Vasco
- Country of origin: Spain
- Distribution: Euskadi (Basque Country/País Vasco)
- Standard: Boletín Oficial del País Vasco

Traits
- Height: 138.5 cm (55 in)

The Basque Mountain Horse, Spanish: Caballo de Monte del País Vasco, Basque: Euskal Herriko Mendiko Zaldia, is a Spanish breed of horse from the autonomous community of Euskadi (the Basque Country or País Vasco). It is listed in the Catálogo Oficial de Razas de Ganado de España, the official catalogue of livestock breeds of Spain, in the group of autochthonous breeds in danger of extinction. It is reared principally for meat.

== History ==
The Basque Mountain Horse originated in the province and historical territory of Álava, the southern part of the País Vasco. It derives from the horses of the traditional Pottok breed, which from the early twentieth century were cross-bred to imported stallions of draught breeds including the Ardennes, Breton, Comtois and Percheron.

The original breed standard of the Euskal Herriko Mendiko Zaldia or Caballo de Monte del País Vasco was officially approved on 21 July 1999 and published in the Boletín Oficial del País Vasco, the official bulletin of the Basque Country; it was repealed in 2015 and replaced with a new one. The first breed society was the Asociación de Ganaderos de Equino de Álava; separate societies later formed in Bizkaia and in Gipuzkoa. In 2014 the three societies merged to form the Euskal Herriko Mendiko Zaldi Arrazaren Federazioa or Federación de la Raza de Caballo de Monte del País Vasco.

In 2013 the total number of breeding animals recorded in the herdbook was 4556. At the end of 2023 the total number registered was 6218, with a breeding stock of 3812 brood-mares and 288 active stallions in the hands of 313 breeders; both the horses and the breeders were all in Euskadi – no horse was reported from any other autonomous community of Spain or from any other country.

== Characteristics ==
The horses are of small to medium size, rustic, muscular and well-proportioned. Average height at the withers (without distinction of sex) is 138.5 cm and the average thoracic circumference ('chest girth') 179 cm; the average cannon-bone circumference is 20 cm. The facial profile is straight or slightly concave. The coat is most commonly chestnut or bay in any shade, and roan and black can also occur; neither grey nor pied (piebald or skewbald) animals are eligible for registration.

== Use ==
The horses are reared principally for meat, at times by breeding mares to stallions of foreign meat breeds such as the Axis and Comtois. Management is extensive and transhumant: the horses spend most of the year pasturing at liberty on the mountains of Álava, but in winter are brought down to lower ground. In the coldest winter months they may receive some additional feed in the form of organic straw or oats; like other transhumant livestock, they are given the extra salt they require. In 2023 reproduction was by natural means only – mares covered by stallions; no use was made of artificial insemination.

Foals are weaned at approximately six months old; they are usually slaughtered at about 12–16 months, at a live weight of some 165–185 kg. The meat may be marketed as Carne de Potro de la Montaña Alavesa; this product is included in the Ark of Taste of the international Fondazione Slow Food per la Biodiversità.

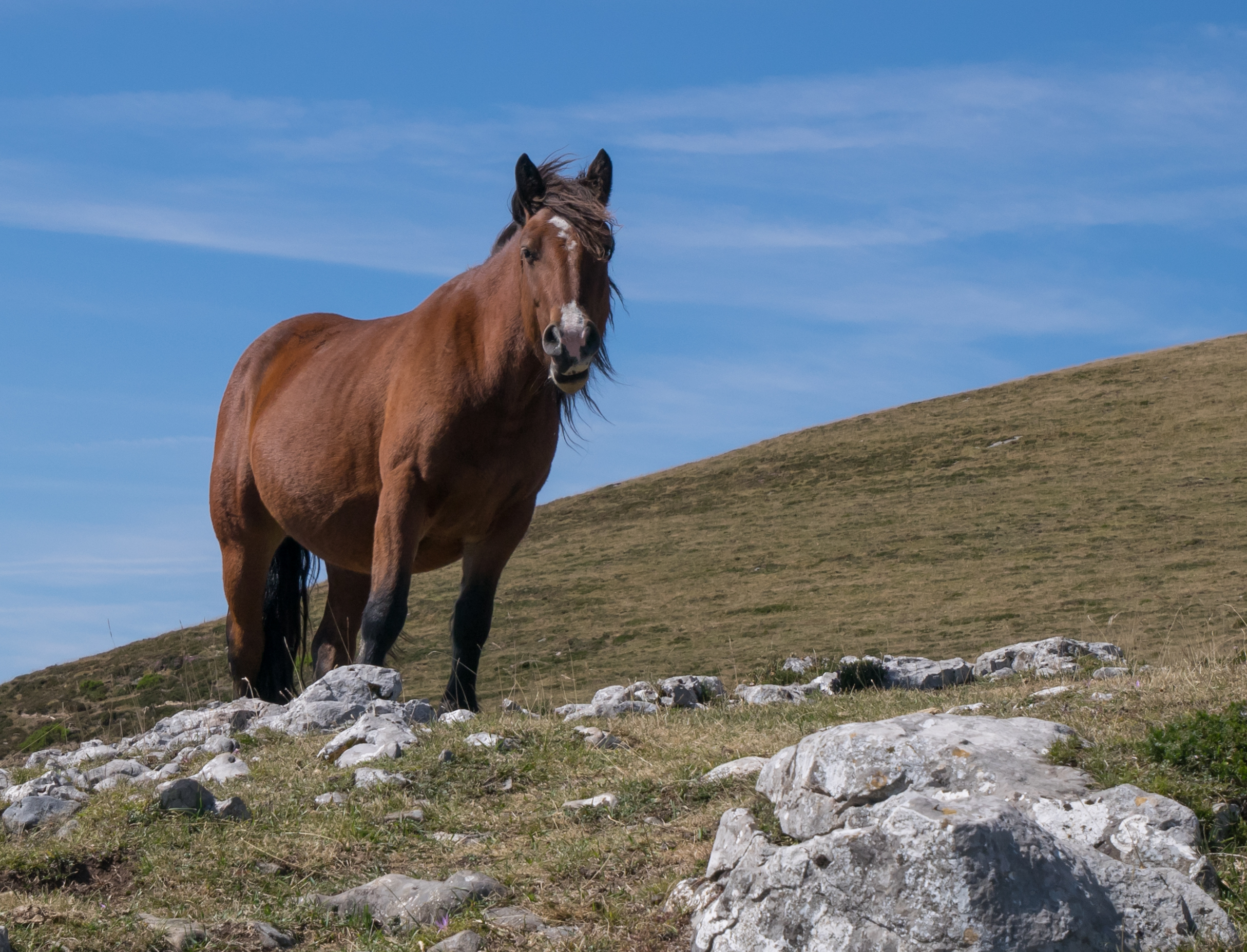
On Gorbeia

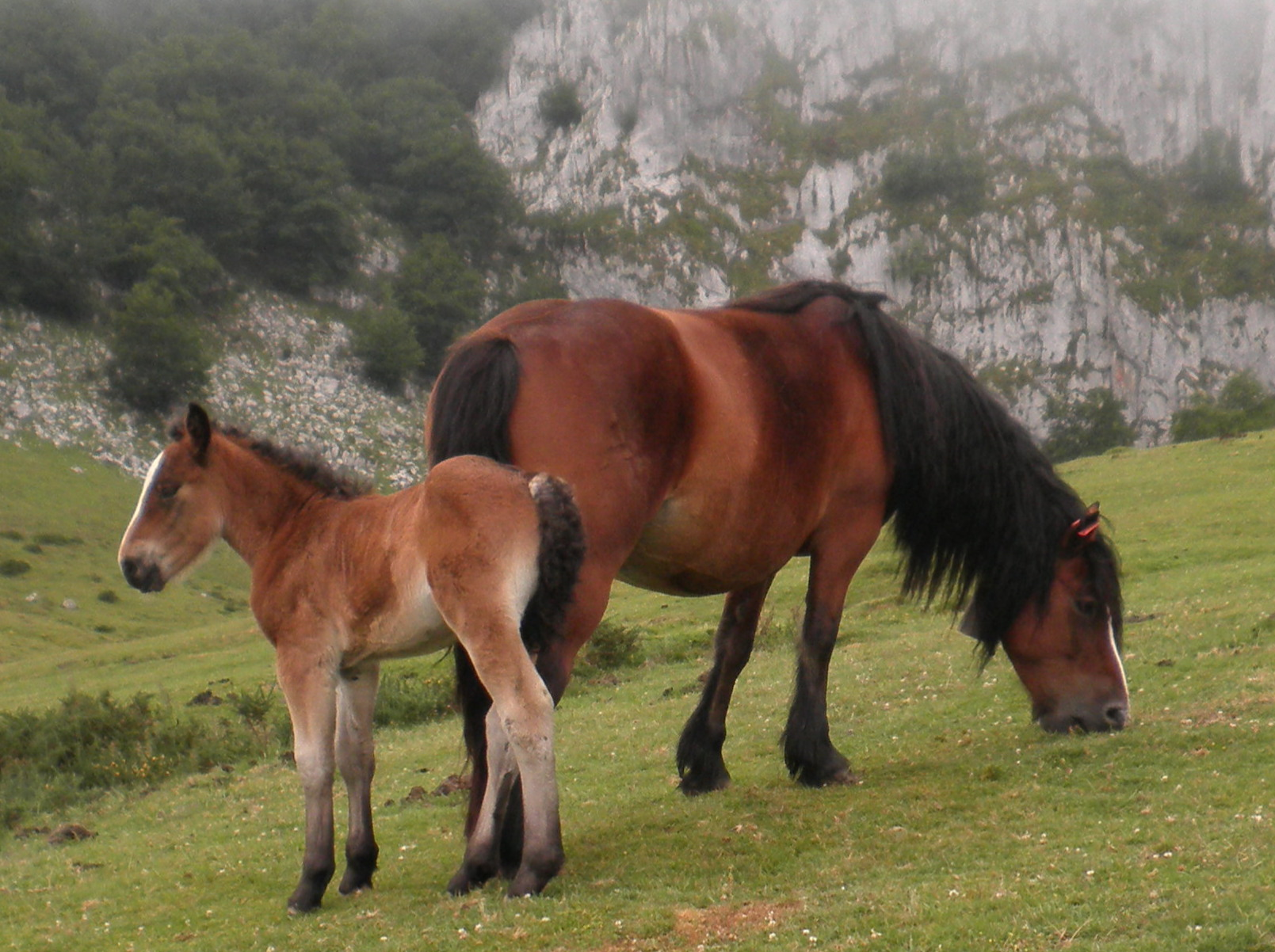
Mare and foal on Gorbeia

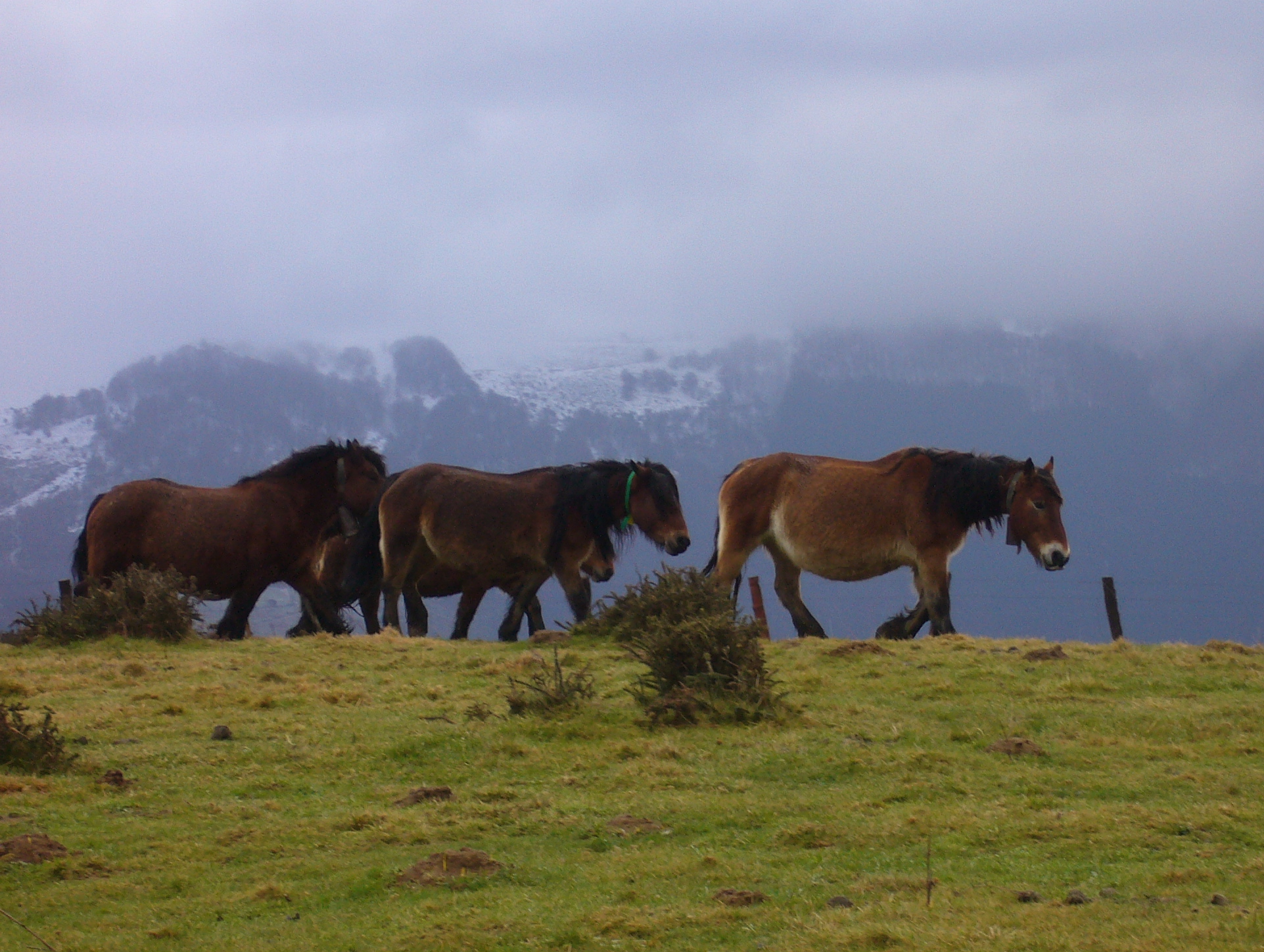
In the Parque Natural de Pagoeta
