= Mallorquín =

Spanish breed of horse

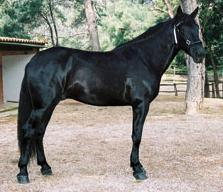
- Conservation status: FAO (2007): critical-maintained; DAD-IS (2020): at risk
- Other names: Cavall Mallorquí; Caballo Mallorquín; Mallorquina; Pura Raza Mallorquina
- Country of origin: Spain
- Distribution: Mallorca, Balearic Islands
- Standard: Dirección General de Recursos Agrícolas y Ganadero (page 7, in Spanish)
- Use: riding horse

Traits
- Height: 155–165 cm; Male: average 162 cm; Female: average 160 cm
- Colour: black

The Mallorquín or Caballo Mallorquín, Catalan: Cavall Mallorquí, is a rare Spanish breed of horse indigenous to the island of Mallorca in the Balearic Islands, from which it takes its name. Identification of the breed was begun in 1981 by the Patronato para las Razas Autóctonas de Mallorca. The Mallorquín is listed in the Catálogo Oficial de Razas de Ganado de España in the group of autochthonous breeds in danger of extinction.

== History ==
The origins of the Mallorquín are obscure. The Mallorquín and Menorquín are genetically closer to each other and to the now-extinct Catalan breed – itself the result of introgression of populations with strong African genetic influence into an original population of Celtic horses introduced to the Iberian peninsula by the Celts in about the eighth century BC – than they are to the five "Atlantic" Celtic breeds of northern Spain, the Asturcón, Gallego, Jaca Navarra, Losino and Pottok.

Identification of the breed was begun in 1981 by the Patronato para las Razas Autóctonas de Mallorca. A stud-book was opened in 1988 by the Prefectura de Cría Caballar of the Spanish ministry of defence, and a breed association – the Associació de Criadors i Propietaris de Cavalls de Raça Menorquina – was established in 1992. The official breed standard was approved in 2003.

The Mallorquín is listed in the Catálogo Oficial de Razas de Ganado de España in the group of autochthonous breeds in danger of extinction. Its status was listed as "critical-maintained" by the Food and Agriculture Organization of the United Nations in 2000 and in 2007. In about 2005 the number of Mallorquín horses recorded in the stud-book was 247, but a census conducted by the Ministerio de Medio Ambiente y Medio Rural y Marino in 2003 had identified only 172. In 2010 a population of 146 was reported, which by 2018 had risen to 320.

== Characteristics ==
The Mallorquín may only be black, in all its variations; horses of any other colour can not be registered. Limited white facial markings are permitted, white leg markings are not. The minimum permissible height is 1.52 m (15.0 h) for males and 1.48 m (14.2 h) for mares.

== Uses ==
The Mallorquín is used by the local population only as a riding horse; farm work in the islands was traditionally done by the Balearic donkey. Mares were traditionally bred to imported stallions, usually of French Trotter or Orlov Trotter breed, to produce Trotador Español (' Spanish Trotter') horses. Approximately 85% of the Spanish Trotter population is in Mallorca; however, genetic study has found little recent influence of the Mallorquín on the Spanish Trotter breed. Mallorquín mares were also much used in the production of mules.
