= Galician horse =

Spanish breed of horse

Galician
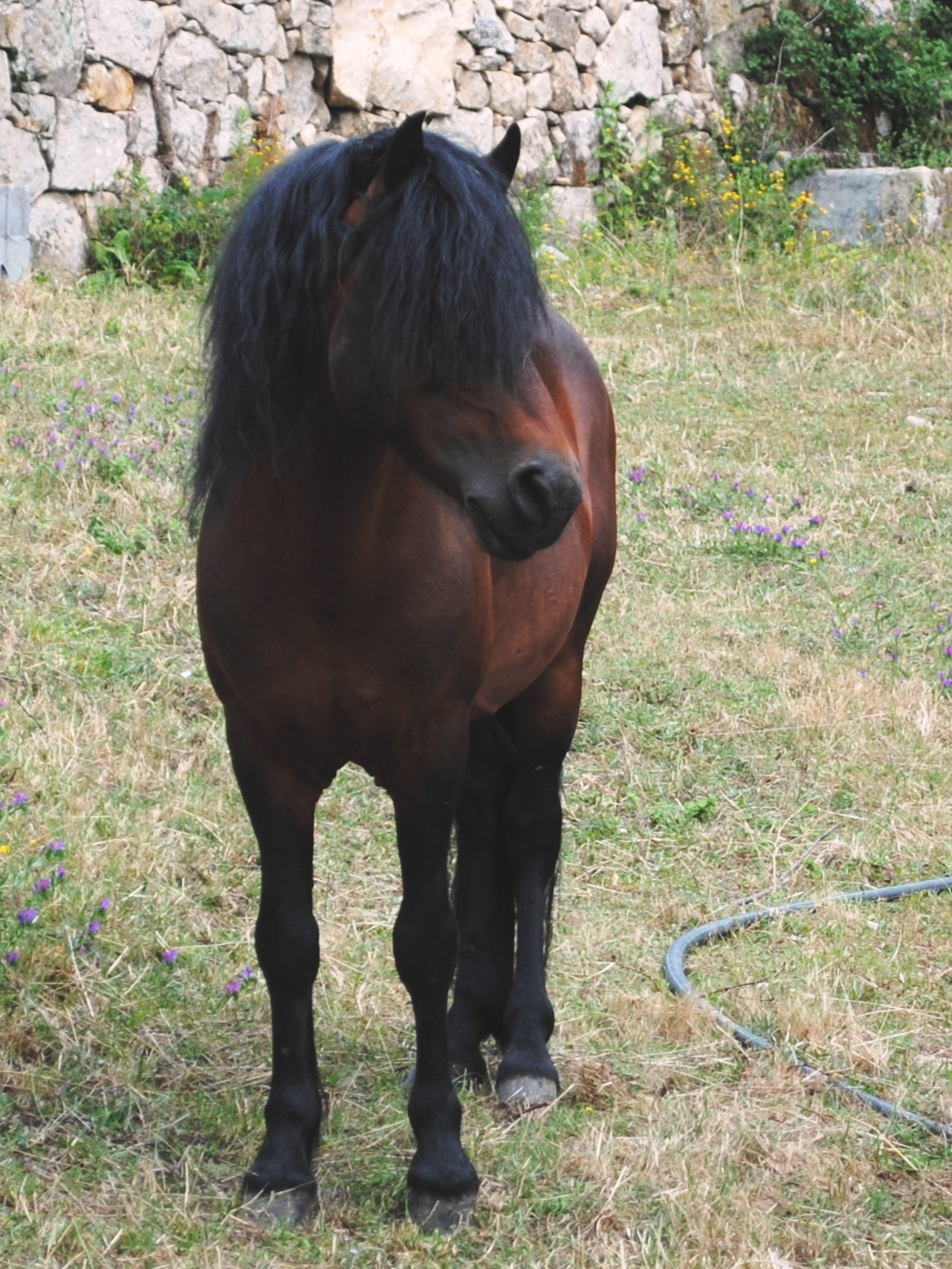
- Conservation status: FAO (2007): endangered-maintained; DAD-IS (2026): at risk/endangered
- Other names: Caballo de Pura Raza Gallega; Cabalo Galego do Monte; Faca Galiziana; Faco Gallego; Galiciana; Galega; Galego; Gallega; Gallego; Jaca Gallega
- Country of origin: Spain
- Distribution: Galicia

Traits
- Weight: 165–300 kg}; Male: average 238 kg; Female: average 182 kg
- Height: 120–140 cm

The Galician or Galician Mountain Horse, Spanish: Caballo de Pura Raza Gallega, Galician: Cabalo Galego do Monte, is a breed of small horse from Galicia, in north-western Spain. It is genetically very close to the Garrano breed of northern Portugal. It was in the past used as a war-horse and in agriculture; it is now raised principally for meat. The horses are bay or black.

== History ==
The most commonly accepted theory of the origin of the Gallego is that it, like other small breeds of the northern part of the Iberian peninsula, descends from small dark-coloured horses introduced by Celtic immigrants in the sixth century BC.

In the Middle Ages these horses were rented or exchanged for other horses at the border between Galicia and Castile, since the Galician was more sturdy and suitable for the rugged landscape of the country.

In the 1980s and 1990s there was concern that the introduction of stallions of other breeds, with better meat-producing qualities, was placing the original stock at risk. The Xunta de Galicia published a conservation plan for the breed in 1993. A breed association, the Asociación Pura Raza Cabalo Galego, was formed in 1997, and in 1998 the breed was officially recognised and a stud-book established.

The Galego is regulated and protected by the Galician government. It is distributed through much of Galicia and is present in the concellos of A Estrada, Cambados, Covelo, Poio, Pontevedra and Santa María de Oia in the province of Pontevedra; of Abegondo, Arzúa, Cambre, Cariño, Cerceda, Curtis, Ferrol, Irixoa, Lousame, Noia, Ortigueira and Porto do Son in the province of A Coruña; of Guitiriz, Muras, Ourol, Mondoñedo, Riotorto, Vilalba and Viveiro in the province of Lugo; and of Castro Caldelas, Coles and Lobios in the province of Ourense. A small number have been exported to Germany. In 2013 the total population was reported as 1623.

In 2015 it was listed by the Ministerio de Agricultura, Alimentación y Medio Ambiente, the Spanish ministry of agriculture, among the fourteen indigenous horse breeds in danger of extinction. (Note: "Raza Autóctona en Peligro de Extinción) Its conservation status was listed as 'endangered-maintained' by the Food and Agriculture Organization of the United Nations in 2007 and as 'at risk/endangered' in 2026.

== Use ==
The horses are usually managed extensively, in semi-feral conditions, on the mountains of Galicia. They may be used for riding or slaughtered for meat; the hair of the mane and tail is used to make brushes.
