= Breton horse =

Breed of draft horse developed in Brittany

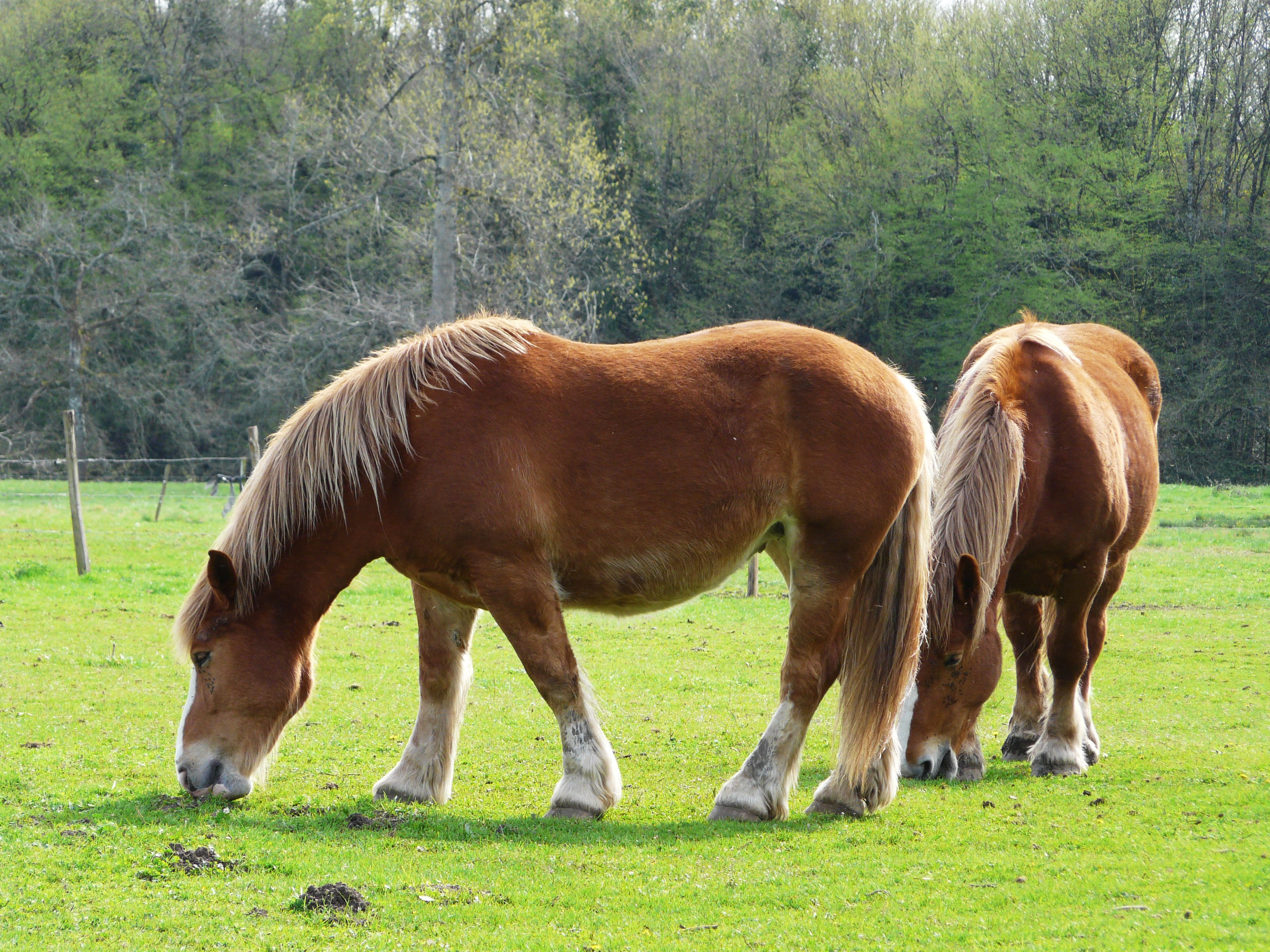

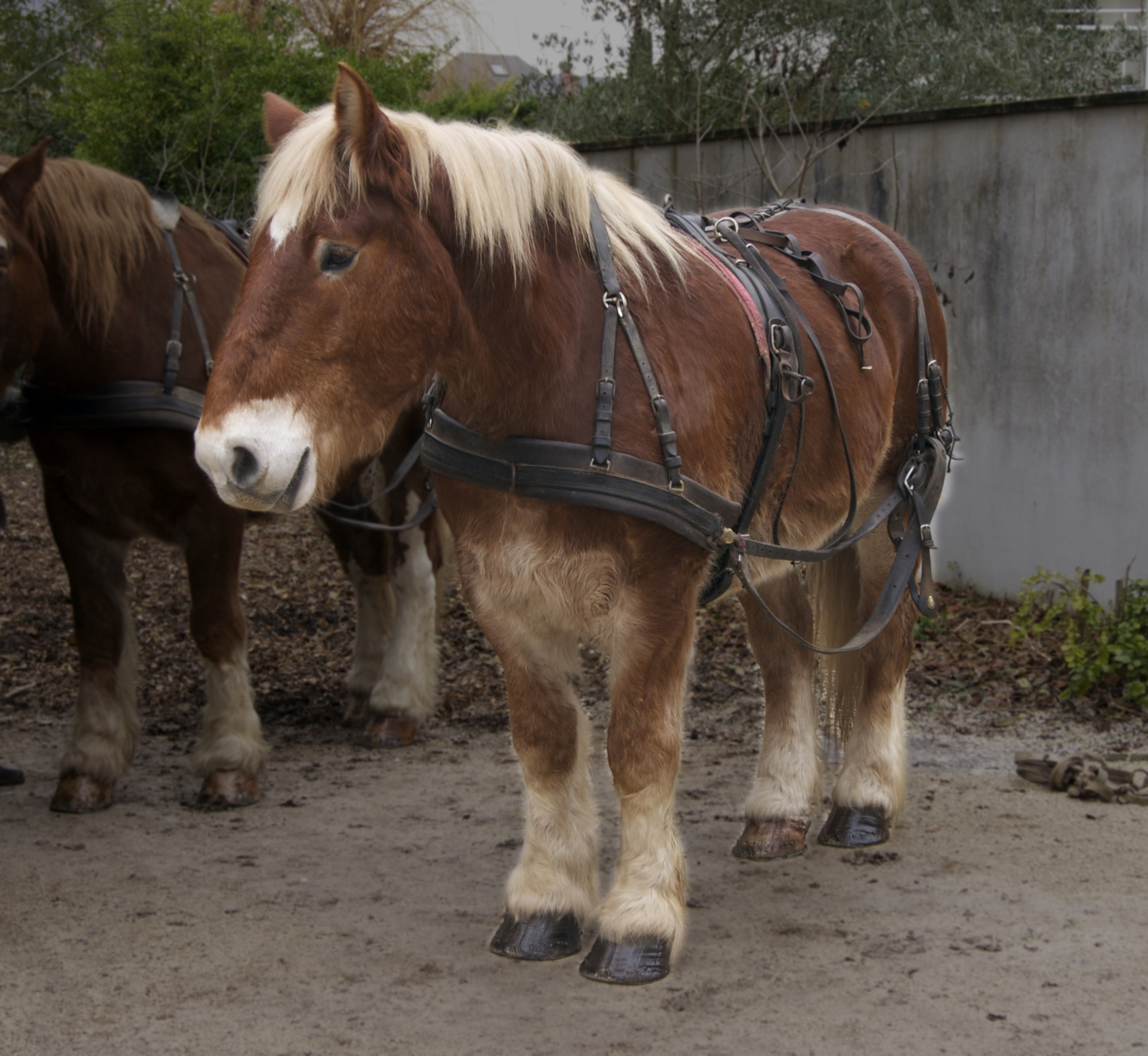
- Conservation status: FAO (2007): not at risk; DAD-IS (2021): not at risk
- Country of origin: France
- Standard: Association Nationale du Cheval de Trait Breton (in French)

Traits
- Weight: Postier Breton: 750–900 kg; Trait Breton: 900–950 kg
- Height: 152–163 cm

The Trait Breton (Breton: Marc'h-dre-lien Breizh) is a French breed of draught horse. It originated in Brittany, in north-west France, from cross-breeding of local horses with various other breeds. It is strong and muscular, and often has a chestnut coat.

There are two principal subtypes: the Postier Breton is an agile harness and light draught breed; the Trait Breton is heavier, and best suited to agricultural work. The Breton was used as a working animal for agricultural and military purposes; in the twenty-first century it is reared principally for horsemeat. A stud book was started in 1909.

== History ==
The Breton was originally bred for strength and durability. One theory is that they were brought to Europe during the Aryan migration from Asia over 4,000 years ago, while another school of thought has them descending from horses bred by Celtic warriors before their conquest of Great Britain.

The original ancestors of the Breton were a population of horses that lived in the Breton mountains, possibly descended from steppe horses ridden by Celts. During the Crusades, these mountain horses were crossed with oriental horses to create a type known as the Bidet Breton. In the Middle Ages, the ancestral Breton horse was sought by military leaders, partly because of its comfortable gait, which was said to be partway between a brisk trot and an amble. Due to its gaits and the fact that it only stood about 1.40 m (13.3 hands) high, it was nicknamed the Bidet d'Allure or Bidet Breton. Horses of other bloodlines brought back to Europe during the Crusades had a strong influence on the Breton, and two types subsequently developed. The Sommier was the common, heavier type, used mainly as a pack horse and for farm and draft work. From the Sommier, the Roussin was developed, was used mainly in wars and on long journeys. The Roussin's natural ambling gait made it popular as a lighter riding horse.

A stud-book was started in 1909. There were originally separate books for the Trait and Postier types, which in 1912 became two sections of a single book, and in 1920 were merged. Also in 1920, a breed association, the Syndicat des Éleveurs de Cheval Breton, was formed. In 2018 the Association Nationale du Cheval de Trait Breton was made the official national association in its place.

The breed retained its mountain roots with its main stud, the National Provincial Stud, being located in the mountain country of Langonnet. In 1920, the decision was made to permit no new outside blood into the studbook, and in 1951 the studbook was officially closed to outside horses.

In France, breeding is concentrated mainly in the four Breton départements of Côtes d'Armor, Finistère, Ille-et-Vilaine and Morbihan, but extends into northern Loire-Atlantique and parts of Maine-et-Loire, the Massif Central and the Pyrenées. New registrations in 2017 were just over 2300; of these, more than 900 were in Brittany, and almost 900 in the regions of Nouvelle Aquitaine and Occitanie in the south-west of the country.

The Breton has been exported to many countries, and has influenced a number of breeds. It may have influenced the Canadian Horse, the Freiberger or Franches-Montagnes of Switzerland, and the Italian Tiro Pesante Rapido. In India, Breton mares were used to produce mules, and contributed to the development of the Indian Half-bred; at Saharanpur some were put to an Anglo-Arab stallion named Mystère to produce carriage horses. The Hispano-Bretón breed of Spain derives from cross-breeding of imported Breton stallions with local mares; the Bréton Empordanès is a population in the Empordà region of Catalonia. After the Second World War a Breton stallion was used to improve the conformation of the German Schleswig Coldblood. In Japan the Breton is among the imported heavy breeds that contribute to the Ban-ei Race Horse.

== Characteristics ==
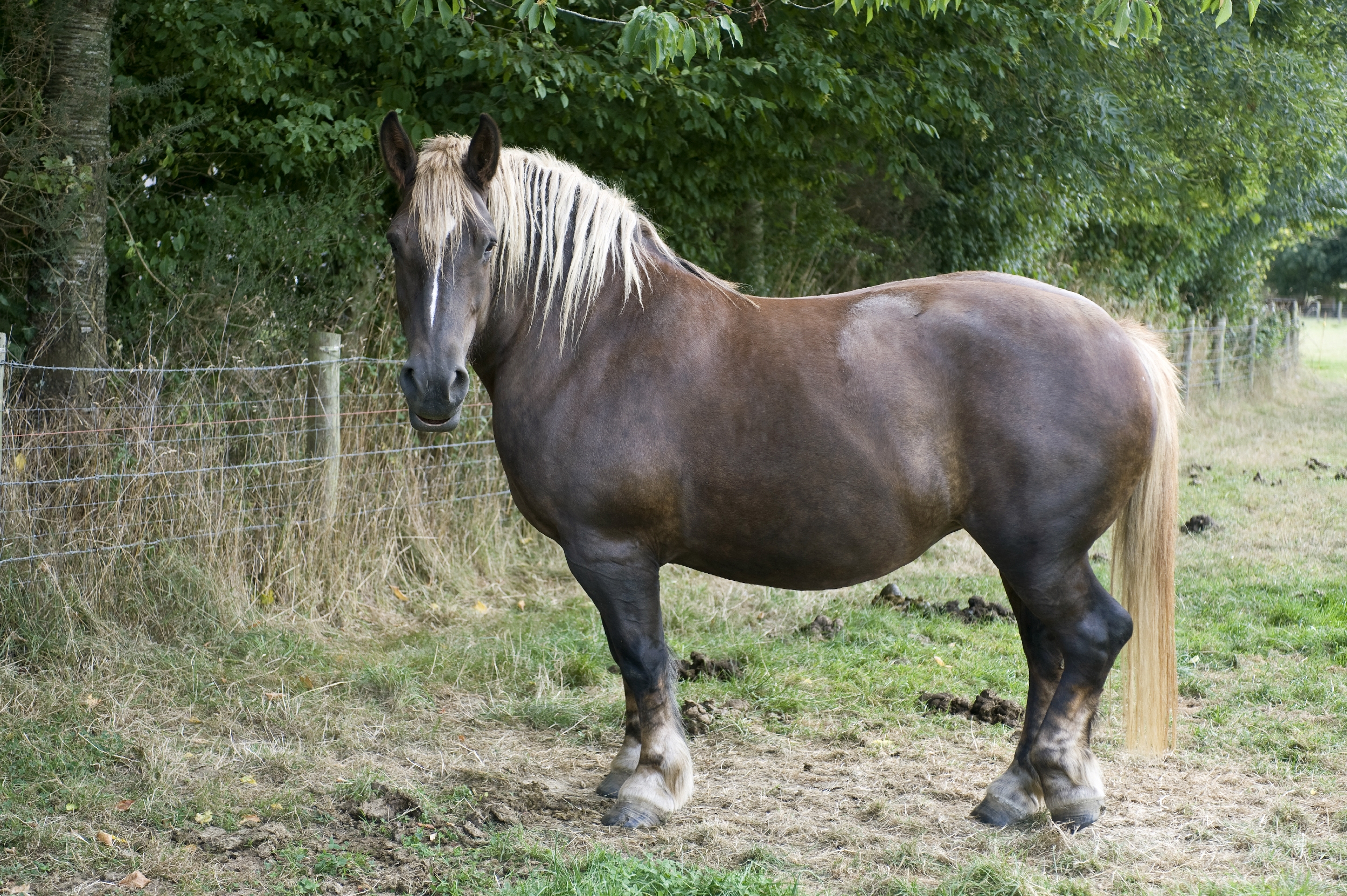
Mare, 2013

The Breton normally stands about 1.55 to 1.63 m (15.1 to 16.0 hands) at the withers, depending on type. It is most commonly chestnut, flaxen chestnut or chestnut roan; bay and blue roan are less usual, and black is rare. Limited white markings are tolerated. The head is of medium size, the profile straight or convex; the neck is long and well set on, the shoulder long and sloped, the chest broad, the breast deep, the back broad, the croup broad and double, and the legs muscular.

Registered animals may be branded with a heraldic ermine on the left side of the neck.

=== Subcategories ===
There are several subtypes of the Breton breed. Two, the Trait Breton and the Postier Breton, are officially recognised, while others such as the Centre-montagne or Central Mountain Breton are not. Older types that have disappeared include the Grand Breton and the Bidet Breton or Bidet d'Allure.

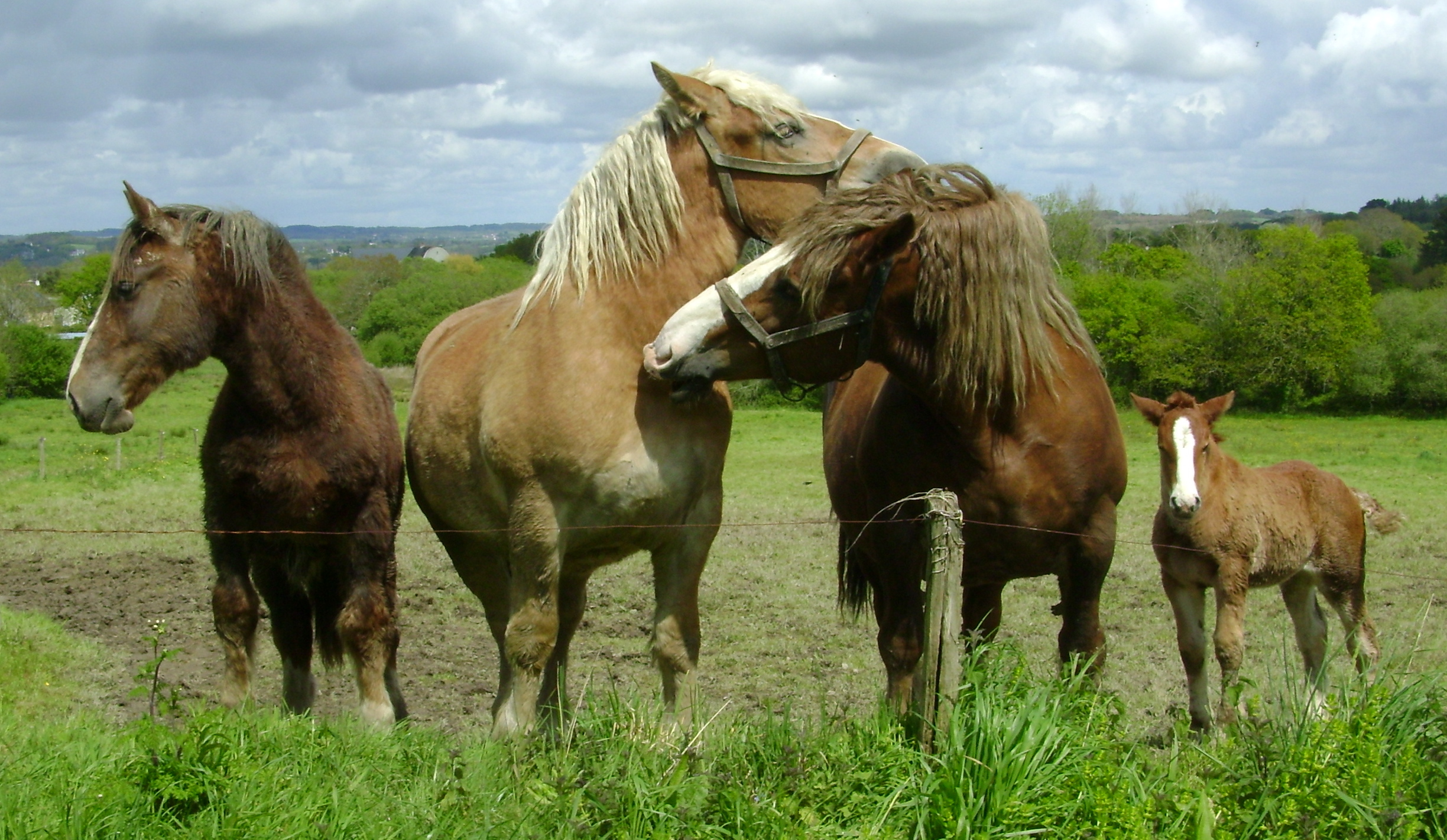
Postier Bretons at pasture

The Postier Breton was developed as a result of cross-breeding with the Norfolk Trotter and the Hackney during the 19th century. Its name originates from its use in pulling mail coaches. The Postier was used extensively by the French Horse Artillery, and it has been described as a lighter version of the Suffolk Punch draft breed from Great Britain.

The Trait Breton is derived from an infusion of Ardennes and Percheron blood. It is very strong relative to its size and has short but muscular legs. This type has absorbed another, older type, called the Grand Breton, a heavier horse that was used to improve many other draft breeds. The Centre-montagne or Central Mountain Breton is a smaller draft type.

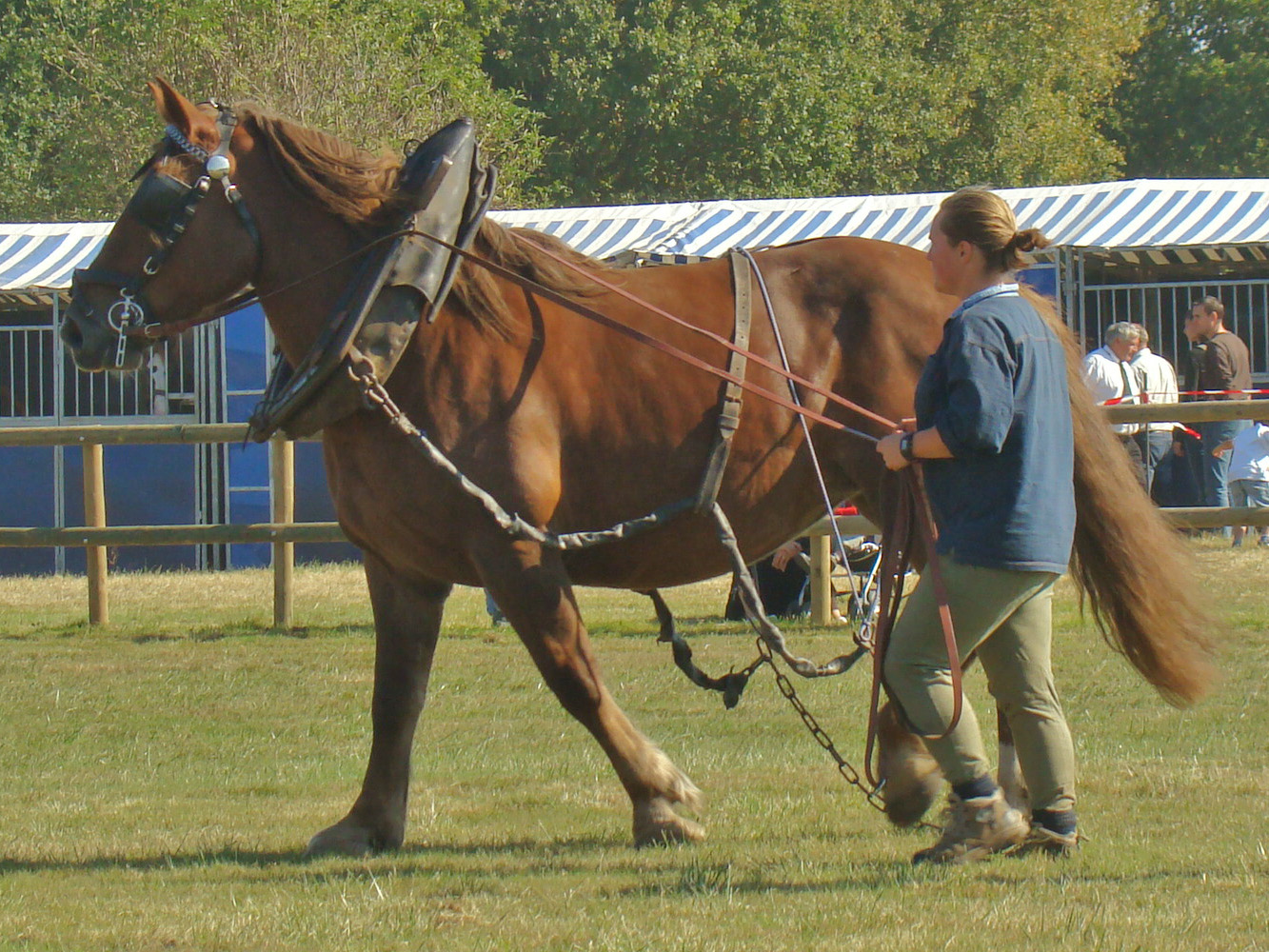
In harness

== Uses ==
The Breton is used in many capacities owing to the various sub-types of the breed. Smaller types can be used under saddle and for fast, light draft work, whilst larger types are ideal for heavy draft and agricultural work. They are also commonly used to improve other breeds through crossbreeding. Today the breed is used as a draft horse on small farms and to gather seaweed. It is also bred for meat production; horse meat is a dietary staple in many European countries, including France, Belgium, Germany and Switzerland.

== See also ==
- List of French horse breeds
