= Jaca Navarra =

Spanish breed of horse

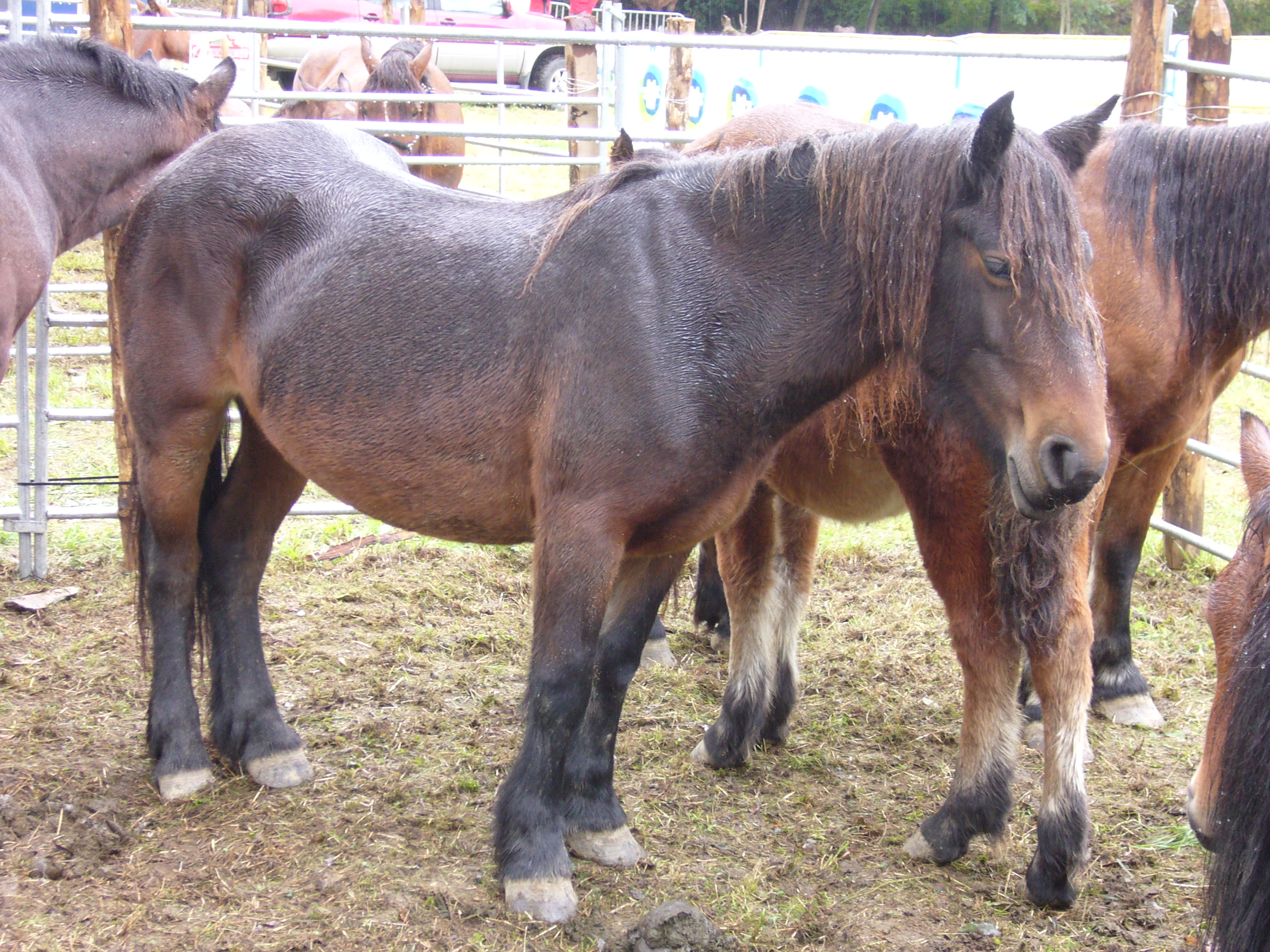
- Conservation status: FAO (2007): endangered; DAD-IS (2022): at risk
- Other names: Basque: Nafarroako zaldiko; Poney Navarro; Caballo Navarro; Caballo Vasco-Navarro; Caballito de Andía; Caballito de las Améscoas; Caballito de la Barranca; Jaca de Montaña; Raza de Pamplona; Raza Pamplonica; Navarrese Horse
- Country of origin: Spain
- Distribution: Navarre
- Standard: Asociación de Criadores de Ganado Equino Jaca Navarra
- Use: draught; meat; conservation grazing

Traits
- Weight: Male: Average: 475 kg (1,047 lb); Female: Average: 400 kg (880 lb)
- Height: Male: Average: 134 cm (53 in); Female: Average: 126 cm (50 in)

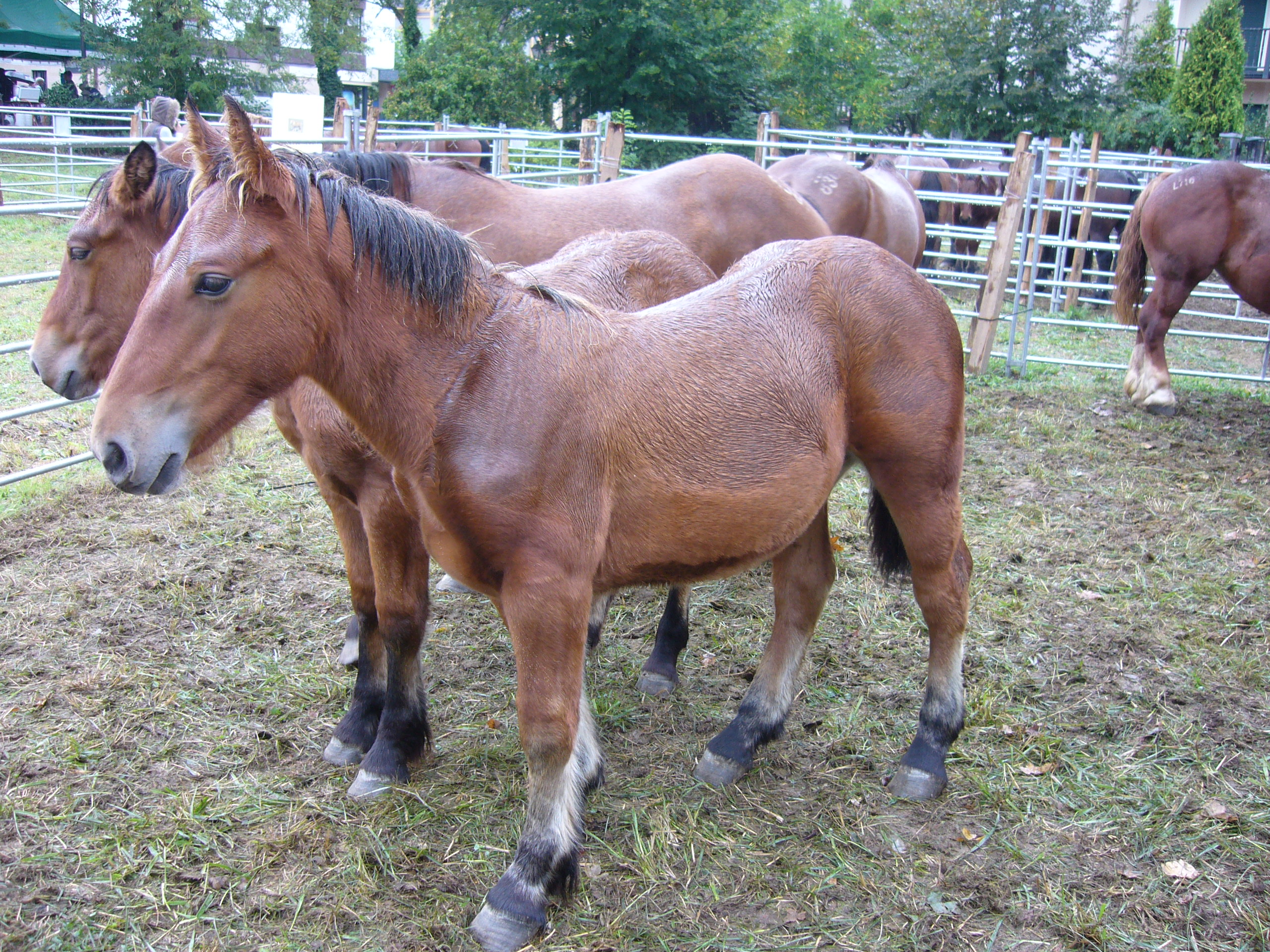
At the market of Ormaiztegi

The Jaca Navarra (Basque: Nafarroako zaldiko), or Navarrese Horse, is a Spanish breed of small horse from the autonomous community of Navarre in the north-eastern part of the country.

== History ==
The origins of the Jaca Navarra are unknown; In 2013 it was listed in the Catálogo Oficial de Razas de Ganado de España in the group of autochthonous breeds in danger of extinction. The total population of the Jaca Navarra has been variously estimated at 350 (in 1999), 250 (in 2000), and 240 and decreasing (in 1997). In April 2011 the total population was reported to be 899, all of which were in Navarre. In 2000, and again in 2007, it was listed by the Food and Agriculture Organization of the United Nations as endangered.

A breeders' association, the Asociación de Criadores de Ganado Equino Jaca Navarra, was formed in 1999, and a stud-book opened in 2001. All but a few examples of the breed are kept in semi-feral conditions in a conservation and reference herd at the Sabaiza estate in Uzquita, in the comarca of Tafalla.

== Names ==
In Spanish, this breed is also known as the Poney Navarro, Caballo Navarro, Caballo Vasco-navarro, Caballito de Andía, Caballito de las Améscoas or Caballito de la Barranca, and was in the past also known as Jaca de Montaña, Raza de Pamplona or Raza Pamplonica.

The word jaca has an unusual history, from Old Spanish haca, itself from Old French haque, which in turn is ultimately derived from the English place-name Hackney, a place famous for its horses.

== Use ==
The Jaca Navarra may be used as a light draught horse. It is reared for meat, and may be used in conservation grazing.
