= 2013 horse meat scandal =

Food scandal in Europe

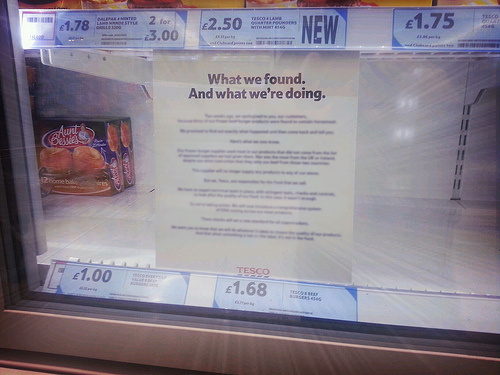
Removal of beefburgers from a Tesco supermarket following the adulteration with horse meat scandal

The 2013 horse meat scandal was a food fraud crisis that began on 15 January 2013 when it was reported that a wide range of food products advertised in the European Union as containing beef were found to contain undeclared or improperly declared horse meat. The crisis escalated in February 2013 when some Findus products were found to contain up to 100% horsemeat instead of beef. A smaller number of products also contained other undeclared meats, such as pork. The issue was discovered through DNA testing on frozen beefburgers and lasagne sold in several Irish and British supermarkets.

The analysis found that 23 out of 27 beef burger samples also contained pig DNA. Adherents of some religions are forbidden from eating pork or horse meat due to their beliefs.

While the presence of undeclared meat was not a health issue, the scandal revealed a major breakdown in the traceability of the food supply chain and the risk that harmful ingredients could have been included. Sports horses, for example, could have entered the food supply chain, and with them the veterinary drug phenylbutazone, which is banned in food animals. The scandal later spread to 13 other European countries, and European authorities decided to find an EU-wide solution. They initiated meat testing of about 4,000 horse meat samples for the veterinary drug.

== Investigations ==
=== Ireland ===
Investigations by the Food Safety Authority of Ireland (FSAI) led Ireland to become the first EU state to report the presence of horse meat in beef and to make the results public. The first positive test for equine DNA was on 10 December 2012. It carried out additional tests on 18 and 21 December. The FSAI then sent samples to the Eurofins laboratory in Germany. Professor Alan Reilly of the FSAI testified to the Oireachtas on 5 February 2013 that the results indicated the presence of equine DNA, but not the amount. The IdentiGen Laboratory and the Eurofins Laboratory were asked to determine the amount of horse meat in the samples. On 21 December 2012, the FSAI requested that the Department of Agriculture, Food and the Marine in Ireland obtain further samples. These were sent to the IdentiGen laboratory on 4 January 2013.

Results were received back from Eurofins and IdentiGen on 11 January 2013. Professor Reilly reported on 5 February that quantitative results from IdentiGen were received by the FSAI late on the evening of 11 January 2013. Of the ten burger products that tested positive for equine DNA, all but one were at low levels. The quantification of equine DNA in this burger product estimated 29% relative to the beef DNA content. Silvercrest manufactured this product on behalf of Tesco. At this point, there was no explanation for the finding of 29% equine DNA relative to beef DNA in this single sample. On 14 January 2013, the FSAI informed the Department of Health and the Department of Agriculture, Food and the Marine of the final results. On the same day, it also informed the Food Standards Agency in the United Kingdom.

The next day, 15 January 2013, the FSAI advised the five retailers concerned – Tesco, Dunnes Stores, Aldi, Lidl and Iceland – of their findings; all these firms withdrew the offending products. The media and newspapers of 16 January 2013 led with the story, focusing on the one burger which tested positive for 29% equine DNA.

Another significant investigation into the horse meat affair in Ireland, by Ireland's Department of Agriculture, published its findings in March 2013. This report's investigation "concluded that there is no evidence that Silvercrest knowingly purchased horsemeat".

=== United Kingdom ===
In the UK, a House of Commons Select Committee on Environment, Food and Rural Affairs report on the horse meat incident was not critical of UK or Irish producers. It expressed concern that horsemeat contamination resulted from fraud and other criminal activity across the EU. Chair of the Committee, Anne McIntosh MP, said: "The evidence suggests a complex network of companies trading in and mislabelling beef or beef products which is fraudulent and illegal."

The second major UK report on the horse meat incident was conducted by Professor Chris Elliott, the Director of the Institute for Global Food Security at Queen's University Belfast. In his independent report, he argues that food crime was at the heart of the horsemeat incident and makes a range of suggestions for how this could be tackled. "Industry, government and enforcement agencies should, as a precautionary principle, always put the needs of consumers above all other considerations, and this means giving food safety and food crime prevention—i.e. the deterrence of dishonest behaviour—absolute priority over other objectives."

=== Test results ===
Of 27 beef burger products tested, 37% were positive for horse DNA, and 85% were positive for pig DNA. Of 31 beef meal products tested, 21 were positive for pig DNA, but all were negative for horse DNA. Nineteen salami products were tested, but were negative for all foreign DNA. Of the 37% of beef products tested positive for horse DNA, Tesco's Everyday Value Beef Burgers tested at 29.1%. All other reported brands had less than 0.3% horse DNA. These products originated from Liffey Meats and Silvercrest Foods in Ireland, and from the Dalepak Hambleton food processing plant in the United Kingdom. Trace amounts of horse DNA were also found in raw ingredients imported from Spain and the Netherlands.

Laboratory DNA investigations were requested by the authorities into possible donkey meat adulteration of minced meat products labelled as 100% beef. British company Primerdesign provided many of the tests to laboratories and companies wishing to test for contamination.

== Companies ==
=== ABP Food Group ===
ABP Food Group logo

By 16 January 2013, four subsidiaries of ABP Food Group had been accused of supplying adulterated meat. They were Silvercrest in County Monaghan, Dalepak in North Yorkshire, Freshlink in Glasgow, ABP Nenagh in County Tipperary, Ireland, and Dairy Crest, Rossington.

Hamburger meat from Silvercrest Foods, a subsidiary of Larry Goodman's ABP Food Group, in County Monaghan, Ireland, was found to contain 29% horse meat relative to beef. Porcine DNA was also found. Tesco dropped Silvercrest as a supplier of processed meat, but ABP said that it "welcomed their decision to continue sourcing fresh beef from other ABP companies". On 15 February 2013, Tesco said, "We will no longer work with the suppliers who fell below our very high standards."

The first apparent instance of fresh beef being adulterated with horse meat was reported by Asda, which removed its 500-gram own-label beef Bolognese sauce from sale. The sauce was supplied by Greencore, which said in a statement that the meat in the sauce had been supplied by ABP Food Group's Nenagh plant in County Tipperary, Ireland. On 4 March 2013, Greencore announced that "multiple further tests for the presence of equine DNA on the same batch of the same product using both screening and quantitative tests (in line with FSA testing protocols) at two different, independent accredited laboratories have all produced negative results" and "an extensive programme of testing of other finished product and raw material at the Bristol facility has produced negative results for the presence of equine DNA. The investigation of the overall incident, overseen by an independent expert ... included an audit of ABP Food Group's plant in Nenagh, Ireland ... found no evidence of contamination in the supply chain."

Burger King, which had more than 500 fast food outlets in Ireland and the UK at the time, dropped Silvercrest as a supplier, using suppliers in Germany and Italy instead, after horse meat was found in their supply chain.

Waitrose removed beef meatballs from sale when it found that they contained pork. The meatballs were manufactured by an ABP factory in Glasgow. Waitrose, part of John Lewis, said it would be creating a new facility to supply its own beef products.

Tesco, the Co-operative Group, Iceland, and Aldi also cancelled their contracts with ABP Food Group due to the adulteration.

Food wholesaler Makro, supplier to the restaurant and pub industry, announced that some of its frozen burgers supplied by Silvercrest tested positive for horse DNA. A spokesman said that Makro no longer sells the product in question.

=== Spanghero ===
On 14 February 2013, the French government stated that a French meat-processing company, À la Table de Spanghero, had knowingly sold horse meat labelled as beef, and that its licence was suspended while an inquiry was underway. Spanghero imported meat from Romania and sold it on to another French company, Comigel, which made frozen ready meals at its factory in Luxembourg. French consumer affairs minister Benoît Hamon said the meat had left Romania clearly and correctly labelled as horse and that it was afterwards that it was relabelled as beef by Spanghero. The investigation also said some blame may rest with Comigel, claiming the staff there should have noticed anomalies in the paperwork, and realised from the smell and look of the meat once it was defrosted that it was not beef.

=== Comigel ===
On 7 February 2013, Findus announced that in a sample of 18 beef lasagne products that it tested, 11 contained between 60% and 100% horse meat. It was also revealed that some of the products sold had minced meat declared as beef that was 60–100% horse meat. The source of the horse meat was third party supplier Comigel, a French-headquartered frozen ready meal producer, from its subsidiary Tavola factory in Capellen, Luxembourg. According to the FSA, the company had been alerted by a third-party French supplier on 4 February 2013, and it tested its beef lasagne products, finding that over 50% of the products tested contained horse meat. According to reports, both Findus UK and the French supplier withdrew all products related to the third-party supplier. The reason for the adulteration was initially stated as "highly likely" criminal activity.

The president of Comigel, Erick Lehagre, told Agence France-Presse that the adulterated meat supplier was Spanghero, a firm owned by Lur Berri and founded in 1970 by Claude and Laurent Spanghero, two former France international rugby players. He said that Spanghero had told him that the meat was not from France, but came from a producer in Romania. On 11 February 2013, France's Consumer Affairs Minister Benoit Hamon warned it "will not hesitate" to take legal action if there is evidence companies had knowingly duped consumers. Hamon said an initial investigation by French safety authorities had found that a French company, Poujol (Spanghero's holding company), had bought frozen meat from a Cypriot trader. That trader had bought it from Dutch food supplier Draap (the Dutch word for horse, paard, spelled backwards), owned by Jan Fasen, who was previously convicted in 2012 of horsemeat fraud dating back to 2007. Draap, in turn, bought it from two Romanian slaughterhouses. Poujol then supplied a factory in Luxembourg, owned by Comigel, which then supplied Findus and the British supermarkets. The Romanian government has stated that there are no contracts between the Romanian abattoirs and any French, Cypriot, or Dutch meat processors.

On 8 February 2013, Findus announced that it would no longer accept meat from Comigel and stopped further deliveries of the product in question. On the same day, Findus UK published a public apology on its website, also announcing that, following DNA testing, three of its products were found to contain horse tissue. These were the 320, 350, and 500 gram packages of Findus Beef Lasagne; the company offered a refund for products purchased. Findus Sverige AB also announced a recall of its 375 gram packs of ready-made single-portion lasagne (code 63957), and published a contact number for customers who had already purchased the products. On 8 February 2013, supermarket chain Aldi announced that it would withdraw from sale Today's Special Frozen Beef Lasagne and Today's Special Frozen Spaghetti Bolognese, supplied by Comigel, after tests found the meat content to be between 30 and 100% horse.

=== HJ Schypke ===
The Swiss-based company Nestlé reported on 18 February 2013 that it had found more than 1% horse DNA in two beef pasta products. It withdrew chilled pasta products, Buitoni Beef Ravioli and Beef Tortellini, in Italy and Spain. Sourced from sub-contractor HJ Schypke, itself a German sub-contractor of Belgian-based Nestlé supplier JBS Toledo, also withdrew frozen Lasagnes à la Bolognaise Gourmandes, a product for catering businesses produced in France.

=== Frigilunch ===
On 22 February 2013, Birds Eye revealed that DNA tests showed that horse meat was present in Birds Eye chili con carne sold in Belgium and supplied by Belgium firm Frigilunch. Birds Eye withdrew three ready meals that contained beef from sale in the UK.

=== Sodexo ===
All of the frozen beef products produced by Sodexo, "one of the largest private catering businesses in Britain", were withdrawn on 22 February 2013 following the discovery of horse DNA in a sample. At the time, the company supplied 2,300 institutions within the UK, including schools, old-age people's homes, prisons, and branches of the armed forces.

=== Kuršu Zeme ===
On 1 March, the Department of Food and Veterinary of Lithuania announced that horse meat was found in three canned beef brands sold by Latvian company Kuršu Zeme. Canned beef made by the Latvian company was removed from sale in Lithuania.

=== Wiljo Import en Export B.V. and Vleesgroothandel Willy Selten B.V. ===
On 10 April 2013, it was reported that two Dutch trading companies, owned by the same person whom food safety officials had previously investigated, may have supplied 50,000 metric tonnes of adulterated beef containing horse meat since January 2011.

=== Findus ===
On 7 February 2013, it was revealed by the Food Standards Agency that the Findus beef lasagne range in the UK, France, Norway, and Sweden, and the shepherd's pie and moussaka ranges in France, contained horse meat without proper declaration or official scrutiny. The contamination may have gone on since summer 2012 according to a leaked document.

=== Compass Group ===
Compass Group was the world's biggest catering firm at the time and discovered through conducting tests that it was unknowingly supplying concealed horse meat in food products to a "small number" of schools in Northern Ireland.

=== Whitbread ===
Whitbread, which was at the time Britain's biggest hotel group, also discovered through tests that it had unknowingly sold concealed horse meat in food products.

== Source of meat ==
The horse meat that was found in Comigel products originated at Doly Com, a Romanian-based slaughterhouse. An inquiry by the French government showed that "the meat had left Romania clearly and correctly labelled as horse. It was afterwards that it was relabelled as beef". Doly Com supplied the horse meat under a contract to Cyprus-based Draap Trading Ltd, a meat trader which operates in the Netherlands. It is owned by a British Virgin Islands holding company, and Jan Fasen is a director. Draap spelt backwards is paard, the Dutch word for horse. After having the horse meat delivered to a cold storage company in Breda, Draap then sold the frozen meat to Spanghero, who insist that it arrived at their Castelnaudary plant labelled as "Beef – originating in EU". After some processing, Spanghero then sent it to Comigel, where the end products for sale were made. According to French media reports, Spanghero falsified documents regarding the meat.

Horse meat found in Silvercrest products is thought to have originated in Poland.

== Health implications ==
A small survey, part of the EU-funded project FoodRisC, conducted by a team from University College Dublin and Brunel University found that health risks were not respondents' first concern; rather, the claims made on labels did not match the contents of food products. Additional concerns included allegations that a "French plant which handled horse meat sold in Britain as beef has previously been at the centre of a major E.coli discovery". Inquiry into horse meat sources in the UK also revealed that Aintree racecourse has a contract with a licensed slaughterhouse in West Yorkshire to remove dead Grand National race horses. It is illegal for horses euthanised by injection to be put into the human food chain. Many chemical agents used for animal euthanasia leave residues in the meat, which may be harmful to humans, and have caused sickness and death in predators and scavengers. Aintree officials stated they were "as confident as we possibly can be that no unfit meat ever reaches the human food chain".

=== Phenylbutazone ===
In January 2013, concerns first arose about the possibility that horse meat containing traces of the veterinary drug phenylbutazone could enter the human food chain, despite regulations that horses treated with it cannot legally be used for human consumption. The drug, commonly known as "bute", is used as an analgesic in horses. The issue was also raised by politicians such as Labour party MP Mary Creagh.

In response, the Food Standards Agency (FSA) initially stated that only five cases of horses slaughtered in the UK had been treated with phenylbutazone, none of which had entered the human food chain. A subsequent review of 206 horse carcasses slaughtered in the UK between 30 January and 7 February 2013 found eight were contaminated with phenylbutazone, six of which had been shipped to France. The UK's Chief Medical Officer, Sally Davies, said the level of contamination, 1.9 mg/kg, posed "very little risk to human health". She added that around 500–600 burgers containing 100% horse meat would need to be eaten to receive the daily human therapeutic dose. Additional tests at that time indicated than none of the products from Findus contained phenylbutazone. Another report found that between two and five percent of samples tested between 2007 and 2011 had phenylbutazone contamination, and that only 50 samples per year were tested. In 2012, 145 carcasses were tested, and two of the nine carcasses that tested positive for bute that year were not reported to the FSA for seven months. In April 2013, the FSA reported it had not only found more than 1% horse DNA in Asda's 340 gram tins of "Smart Price Corned Beef" but it also contained four ppb of phenylbutazone, marking the first time since the start of the scandal that bute had been detected in a meat product in the UK food chain.

However, one problem raised was over-documentation; all UK animals with phenylbutazone contamination tested in early 2013 possessed a "horse passport" that allowed their carcasses to be sold for human consumption. The veterinary residues committee (VRC) reminded the public in July 2012 that it had been "repeatedly expressing concern" about phenylbutazone contamination. and recent discoveries of contamination suggest that the passport system was not working.

Phenylbutazone is used therapeutically in humans as a treatment for ankylosing spondylitis when other treatments are not suitable. The effect on humans of low-level exposure over an extended period has not been extensively formally studied. High incidences of focal necrosis were found in female rats fed low doses of 1,2-diphenylhydrazine over time. Non-steroidal anti-inflammatory drug (NSAID) residues risk causing rare, but potentially fatal side-effects in humans. There is inadequate data on carcinogenicity of phenylbutazone; it is not classifiable as to its carcinogenicity to humans.

There is also speculation that some horse meat from the United States, where phenylbutazone is commonly used, may have entered the food chain via Mexico and then been exported to Europe. One reason for this is that Spanghero had purchased meat from a company, Draap, whose owner, Jan Fasen was previously convicted for fraud; as long ago as 2007, Draap had labelled horse meat imported from Mexico and South America as Dutch or German beef. The primary concern is horse meat from the United States: up to 15% of horses sent to slaughter in Canada or Mexico are former racehorses that have been given drugs during their racing career, such as phenylbutazone, which are approved for use in horses but not humans and carry the warning "Do not use in horses intended for human consumption." Further, they are given medication at levels that led a research veterinarian to call them "walking pharmacies". These animals may have meat too toxic to eat safely.

=== Equine infectious anaemia ===
Some experts and UK government officials have raised concerns that horse meat from Romania could be contaminated with equine infectious anaemia (EIA). Although EIA does not pose a risk to humans, it could be an indicator of additional health problems in horses that may stem from poor living conditions. Since 2007, the European Union has restricted export of live horses from Romania to any other EU member state unless the animals have a Coggins test for EIA prior to export. Environment secretary Owen Paterson stated that "Romanian horse meat is not allowed in", though he acknowledged that it could be a serious problem if Romanian horse meat from animals with EIA had been imported.

Some news outlets referred to EIA as "Horse AIDS", even though it is not an immunodeficiency syndrome and the retrovirus that causes it is equid-specific. EIA is, however, a lentivirus, like HIV, and thus research on EIA has the potential to help research efforts with HIV/AIDS.

== Contributory causes ==
An article by Will Hutton about contamination in the UK lays much of the responsibility at the door of those who have removed much of the regulation of the meat industry, and cut the budgets and workforces—halving the number of inspectors—of those responsible for enforcing the remaining regulations. Another article points out that "Long business supply chains are corruptible and can hide a multitude of crimes if no one checks for fraud or criminal activity".

In Britain, the incident was a catalyst for the discussion of the validity of a self-regulated meat industry. Karen Jennings, assistant general secretary of the UNISON trades union, said that "the industry isn't fit to regulate itself".

== Implications for religious groups ==
Observant Muslims and Jews consider it sinful to eat certain types of meat, pork for both groups, and also horse and many other animals for Jews, due to religious prohibitions. Professor Reilly stated "for some religious groups or people who abstain from eating pig meat, the presence of traces of pig DNA is unacceptable". On 15 March 2013, a Westminster health and safety survey confirmed that pig DNA had been found in halal chicken sausages produced for schools.

== Reactions ==
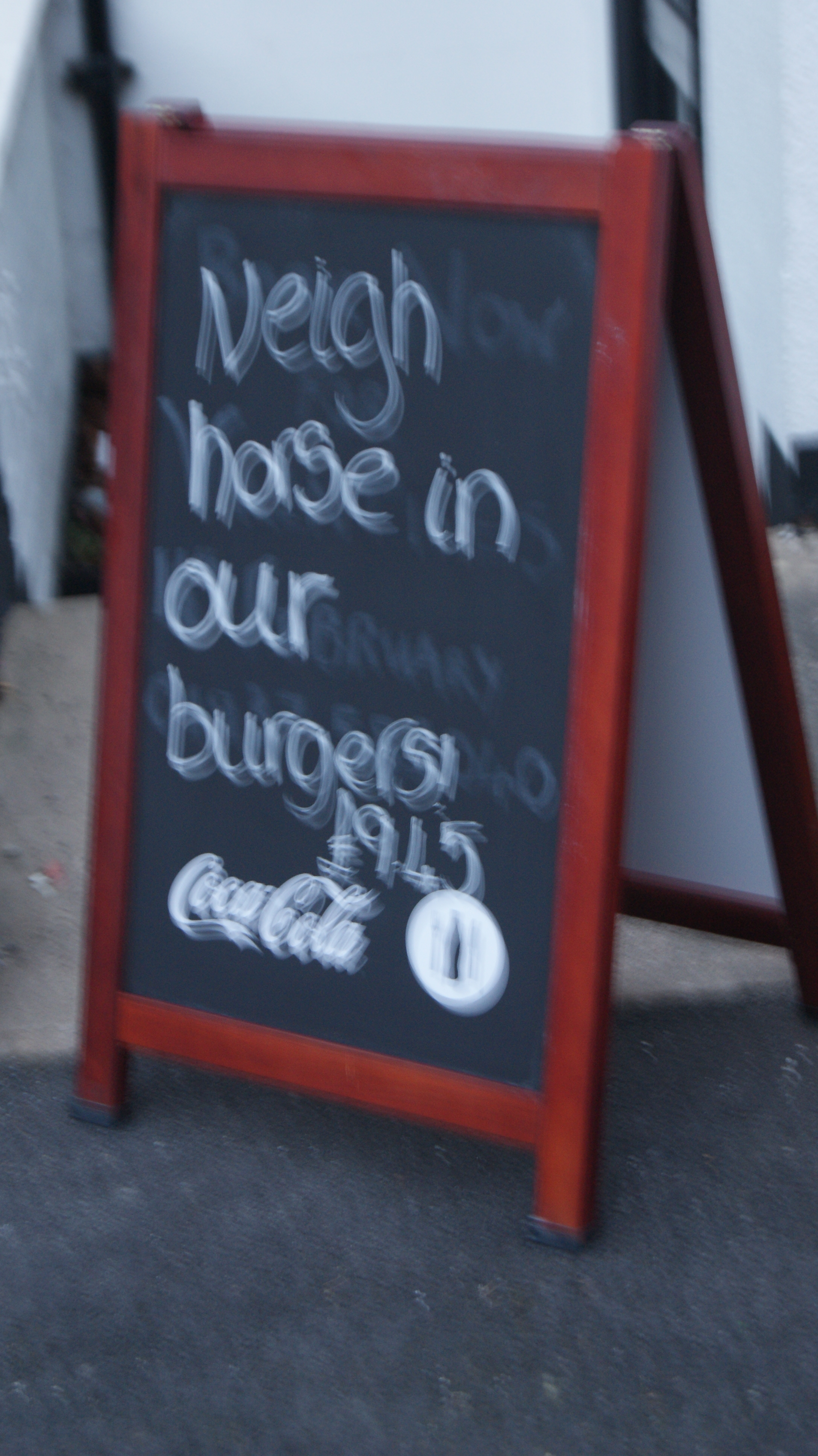
"Neigh horse in our burgers", a satire on the scandal outside a pub in Wetherby, West Yorkshire

Horse meat is not normally eaten in Ireland and Britain. According to Professor Reilly, chief executive of the FSAI, "In Ireland, it is not our culture to eat horse meat and therefore, we do not expect to find it in a burger". Silvercrest, a subsidiary of ABP Foods has claimed that there is no risk to the public upon eating the foreign meat. Eleven firms, including Tesco and Asda, said they shared shoppers' "anger and outrage". Whitbread vowed to remedy the unacceptable situation. The Food Standards Agency's (FSA) chief executive, Catherine Brown also said "it is unlikely we will ever know" how many unwittingly ate horsemeat.

Tesco's market value dropped by €360 million.

=== European Union officials ===
European Union officials, European ministers and Commissioner (Tonio) Borg set up an urgent meeting in Brussels on 13 February 2013 on how to contain the horse meat scandal that exposed flaws in European control systems on food safety, and to formulate an action plan. Following the meeting, EU agriculture ministers announced a three-month coordinated control plan of DNA testing of processed meat across the European Union. The plan, adopted 19 February 2013, called for 2,500 random tests on processed food for horse DNA and 4,000 for phenylbutazone (bute), beginning in March 2013, with initial results announced on 15 April 2013. The Hague-based Europol would handle the co-ordination of investigations among national authorities, as well as any raids on premises and arrests on suspicion of criminal conspiracy to defraud.

=== Sales drop ===
On 26 February 2013, it was announced that sales of frozen hamburgers had fallen by 43% and frozen ready meals by 13% from pre-scandal levels. The study took place 21 January – 17 February. Sales of bona fide horse meat, on the other hand, increased in those EU countries where it is moderately common.

== Factories ==
Table of factories that produced adulterated foods
Parent company	Factory name	Health mark (factory number)	Address	Location	% of sample contaminated
ABP Food Group
ABP Food Group	Silvercrest Foods	IE 565 EC	Ballybay, County Monaghan, Ireland	54.1326°N 6.9070°W	29.1
ABP Food Group	Dalepak Hambleton	UK HN012 EC	Leeming Bar Industrial Estate, Northallerton, North Yorkshire, England	54.3046°N 1.5664°W	0.1
Liffey Meats	Liffey Meats	IE 325 EC	Ballyjamesduff, County Cavan, Ireland	53.8527°N 7.2065°W	trace
Comigel	Tavola	–	Capellen, Luxembourg	49.6479°N 5.9855°E	30–100

== Arrests ==
On 23 May 2013, a Dutch meat wholesaler, Willy Selten, was arrested for allegedly selling 300 tonnes of horsemeat as beef. Selten, who owns the meat wholesaler Willy Selten BV, was arrested together with the company's interim director. In October, Barry Gardiner MP, the UK shadow Environment minister, criticised the lack of prosecutions of leading players ten months after David Cameron had promised that everything possible would be done to deal with a "very shocking" crime. Gardiner said, "The extraordinary thing is that because of its clout, industry has been able to commit what appears to be a criminal offence – selling the public horsemeat falsely labelled as beef – and just say they are sorry and didn't know."

On 26 August 2016, Andronicos Sideras, owner of Dinos and Sons Ltd, was charged with conspiring with Ulrich Nielsen and Alex Ostler-Beech, of Flexi Foods, to sell horsemeat as beef between 1 January 2012 – 31 October 2012 by the City of London Police. On 2 August 2017 Sideras was jailed for four years and six months and Nielsen for three years and six months, while Ostler-Beech was given an 18-month suspended sentence and a 120 hour-community service order.

== December seizures ==
In December 2013, consignments of horse meat were seized, and arrests were made. 21 people were arrested on Monday, 16 December, in various parts of southern France. This meat was from horses kept on a farm attached to a scientific laboratory and not certified as fit for human consumption. A dealer from Narbonne was helping police with enquiries.

== Timeline ==
Date	Event
2012 Summer	Adulteration may have started, according to a leaked document.
2012-11-30	FSAI receives results from the IdentiGen laboratory on samples bought on 7–9 November 2012, which were Salami products (19), beef meal products (31), and beef burger products (27). Where the quantitative test resulted in 23 (85%) beef burger products testing positive for porcine (pig) DNA and 10 (37%) testing positive for equine (horse) DNA. The burgers came from 6 plants in Ireland and 3 plants in the UK. The products which tested positive for equine DNA came from 2 plants in Ireland and one in the UK.
2012-12-07	Irish authorities become aware of the adulteration in ABP Food Group burgers with 29% horse meat content.
2012-12-10	FSAI receives laboratory result from DNA sequencing confirms presence of equine (horse) and porcine (pig) DNA.
2012-12-18	FSAI receives laboratory confirmation on equine (horse) DNA from another round of purchased burger samples from 10 December from the same or similar product batches to the original samples that tested positive.
2012-12-19	FSAI receives result that the 10 burgers sampled on 7 to 9 November 2012, which tested positive for equine (horse) DNA, were negative for the presence of phenylbutazone and other drugs.
2013-01-11	Samples that FSAI requested from Department of Agriculture, Food and the Marine on 21 December, of raw ingredients from the two implicated meat processing plants in Ireland, and analysed by the IdentiGen laboratory on 4 January 2013, showed very low or trace levels of equine (horse) DNA in beef products from the Netherlands, Spain, and Ireland. However, they were not linked as ingredients. FSAI receives Semi-quantitative results from the Eurofins laboratory (Germany) that corroborate the initial results from the IdentiGen laboratory. Quantitative results from IdentiGen lab indicate that only 1 of 10 burger tests showed an estimated low 29% level of equine (horse) DNA. This product was manufactured by Silvercrest on behalf of Tesco.
2013-01-15	The Food Safety Authority of Ireland (FSAI) announced that horse meat had been found in frozen beefburgers at several Irish and British supermarkets, including Tesco, Asda, Dunnes Stores, Lidl, Aldi, and Iceland. The FSAI conducted tests on a selection of beef and salami products with "best before" dates between June 2012 and March 2014. FSAI advises the five retailers concerned (Tesco, Dunnes Stores, Aldi, Lidl and Iceland) of their findings. The implicated products are removed immediately.
2013-01-16	Tesco's market value dropped by 360 million EUR.
2013-01-24	Food Safety Authority of Ireland (FSAI) withheld 24 test results from a German laboratory.
2013-01-29	Samples that FSAI requested that HSE formally take from burgers in a range of retail and catering premises were analysed in the Eurofins laboratory under the direction of the HSE's public analyst. All tested negative except one which was a sample from Tesco that confirmed previous findings.
2013-02-04	Findus is alerted by a third party that the beef lasagne product did not "conform to specification".
2013-02-07	Revealed that Findus beef lasagne range in the UK, France, and Sweden, and the shepherd's pie and moussaka ranges in France contained horse meat without proper declaration. Out of 18 products 11 tested positive for horse meat.
2013-02-08	DGCCRF inspected Spanghero and was able to review the traceability of documents for the concerned batches over the past 4 months, which attests to the conformity of Spanghero's procedures.
2013-02-13	European ministers and Commissioner (Tonio) Borg meet urgently in Brussels.
2013-02-14	DGCCRF investigation results become public, and determine the source of the fraud. On 14 February, the French government blamed the French company Spanghero, but the company says it acted in good faith. The fraudulent sale shipped 750 ton of meat during 6 months.
2013-02-14	One 63-year-old man was arrested at Peter Boddy Licensed Slaughterhouse, in Todmorden, West Yorkshire and two men, aged 64 and 42, were held at Farmbox Meats Ltd, near Aberystwyth, Wales, following searches by the Food Standards Agency (FSA) on 12 February 2013
2013-02-25	A study by Stellenbosch University found traces of water buffalo, goat, and donkey meat in various products on sale in South Africa.
2013-02-27	Gæðakokkar 30% meat pie sold in Iceland is found not to contain any meat at all.
2013-03-07	One of two Russian suppliers of sausage to IKEA in Russia is found to contain horse meat despite its labelling.
2013-03-08	Meat returned with green mould is cleaned, dried, and resold in the Polish plant to make sausages and ham. Exports to the UK, Ireland, Germany, and Lithuania. Three other Polish meat-processing plants were found to label horse meat as beef.

(The IdentiGen and Eurofin laboratories are both accredited to the European Standard EN ISO/IEC 17025:2005.)

== See also ==
- 2008 Irish pork crisis
- 2013 aflatoxin infestation
- List of food contamination incidents
- Mad cow crisis
- Taboo food and drink
- Pink slime
- Geriatric horses
