= Comigel =

French food processing company

Comigel S.A.S. is a privately owned French food processing company, headquartered in Metz.

== History ==
Founded in 1972 in Luxembourg, it moved its headquarters to Metz in 1976. The company was owned by Perkins Foods Holdings Ltd of the United Kingdom from 1991, and then purchased by French-based private equity firm Céréa Capital and for a minority share by Unigrains in 2007. The leading directors of Comigel are Antoine Sage, Erick Lehagre, Gilles Sicard, Antoine Peyronnet and Michel Chabanel of Céréa Capital.

The private venture capital was invested by another private equity house Unigrains in 2010, who specialise in acquiring agricultural and food businesses across Europe. Unigrains claim to have an investment experience and partnership of 50 years in more than 200 French agri-businesses. Unigrains is also the owner of Ekkia, a horse trading company. Unigrains is also an investor in Labeyrie Fine Foods (a Lur Berri company and owners of Spanghero). The directors of Unigrains are Jean-François Laurain, (DG d’Unigrains), Michel Chabanel, (président de Céréa Gestion, Didier Bosc, (directeur des investissements et du développement d’Unigrains), Gilles Sicard : (DG de Céréa Capital), Antoine Peyronnet, Antoine Sage, (directeurs Céréa Capital), Fabrice Vidal, (DG de Céréa Mezzanine).

After the purchase of Atlantique Alimentaire in 2010, employing 240 and based in La Rochelle, group turnover reached 100 million euros, on production of 30,000 tons of food.

== Operations ==
Comigel produces mainly frozen convenience food for the European market, and is a provider of white-label products for different food and retailers' brands of frozen fast food and desserts.

At the Tavola factory in Capellen, Luxembourg, 200 employees produce 16,000 tonnes annually of frozen ready-meals. These are then sold to retailers including Auchan and Cora in France, while a third are exported to customers including Findus, and Tesco in the UK. One quarter of the factory's output goes to restaurants in schools, colleges, hospitals, retirement homes, company canteens and public service restaurants.

== Horse meat contamination ==
In February 2013, it was reported that a lasagne product that Comigel produces in Luxembourg on behalf of Findus and Aldi for distribution in Great Britain, Ireland and Sweden, was found to contain up to 100% horse meat instead of the 100% beef as declared in the list of ingredients, in 11 out of 18 samples in a Food Standards Agency check. Comigel claimed that the meat supplier was Spanghero, a firm owned by Lur Berri.

Findus announced that they will accept no more meat from Comigel, and stopped further deliveries of the product in question . On 8 February 2013, Findus Sweden announced a recall of its 375g packs of ready-made lasagne (code 63957) and published a contact number for customers who wanted to return the products they had already purchased.

Supermarket chain Aldi announced on 8 February 2013 that it would be withdrawing Today's Special Frozen Beef Lasagne and Today's Special Frozen Spaghetti Bolognese, products both sourced and supplied from Comigel, after tests found the meat content to contain between 30% and 100% horse meat.

The BBC reported, on 11 February 2013, that supermarket chain Tesco had discovered the meat in some of its Everyday Value Spaghetti Bolognese was 60% horsemeat.

British Environment Secretary Owen Paterson told the House of Commons that it appeared that '"criminal activity" had been at the heart of the scandal.

On 14 February 2013, Dutch media reported that the frozen lasagne sold by the Dutch supermarket Albert Heijn under the Euroshopper brand, also originated from Comigel, via a subsidiary known as Tavola. The Primafrost Lasagne sold by Coop, Plus, Boni and Nettorama supermarkets in the Netherlands, also turned out to be supplied by Comigel.

French government members Stéphane Le Foll "Ministre de l'Agriculture" and Benoît Hamon "Ministre de la Consommation" concluded on 14 February 2013 that during further criminal investigations the meat processor Spanghero will have its licence suspended.
