= Walter Spanghero =

French rugby union player (born 1943)

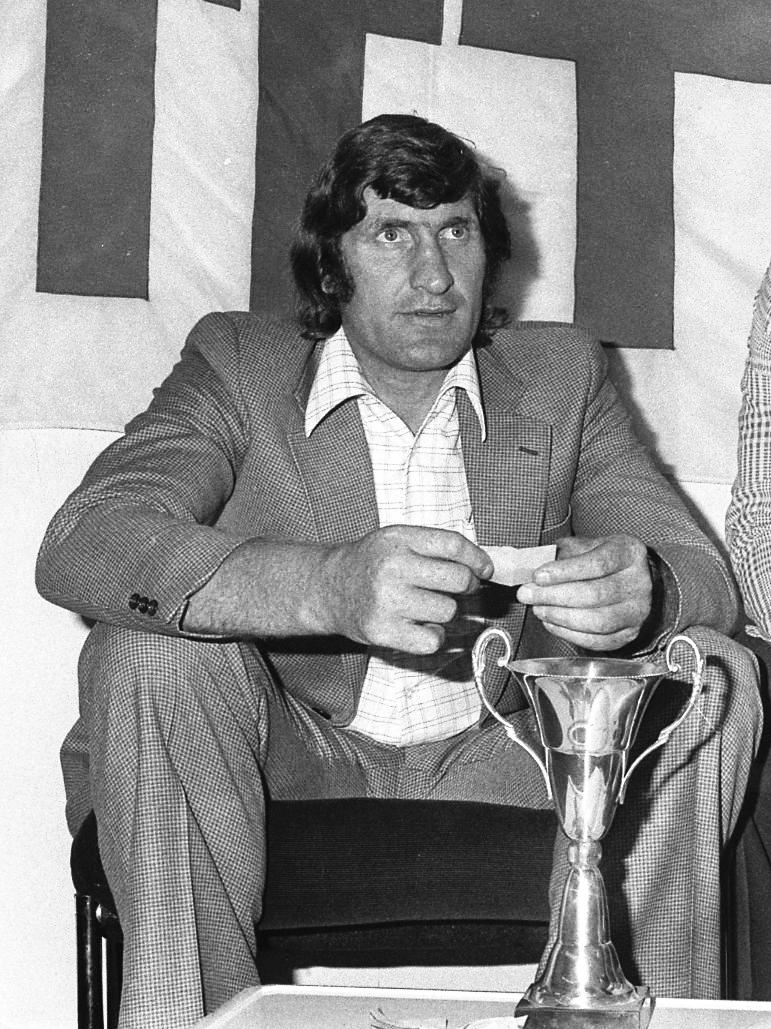
- Walter Spanghero in 1978
- Born: 21 December 1943 (age 82) Payra-sur-l'Hers, France
- Height: 1.87 m (6 ft 1 1/2 in)
- Weight: 100 kg (220 lb)
- Notable relative(s): Nicolas Spanghero; Claude Spanghero

Rugby union career
- Position(s): Lock, number eight, flanker
Senior career
Years	Team	Apps	(Points)
1961–1975	Narbonne		
1975–1977	Toulouse		
International career
Years	Team	Apps	(Points)
1964–1973	France	51	(14)

Walter Spanghero (born 21 December 1943) is a former French rugby union footballer. His father, Ferruccio Dante Spanghero, emigrated from Friuli, arriving in France in the 1930s to make a living as a bricklayer. He was a part of the France national team which won the 1968 Grand Slam in the Five Nations. He was also a part of the French side which won the Five Nations in 1967 and 1973. He played for France over 50 times. He played at number 8, lock and flanker. He famously had a very stormy relationship with his brother, Claude, who was also an international rugby player for France.

== Youth ==
Walter Spanghero was born on December 21, 1943, in Payra-sur-l'Hers (Aude). His parents, Ferrucio and Romea, were both italian immigrants who had settled in France in the 1930's. They run a farm in the village of Bram, and Ferrucio played in the rugby union local team. They had eight children together, two daughter, Maryse and Annie, and six boys, Laurent, Jean-Marie, Walter, Claude, Guy et Gilbert. Walter is the third kid of the family. Walter was taken out of school at thirteen after an incident with a teacher, who tried to hit him and broke his ankle. He then work with his father at the familial farm.

== High level rugby player ==
Walter started playing rugby at the age of 17, in 1960, with the Bram club. The following year, he joined Narbonne first division team, where his older brother Laurent was already playing.

All the Spanghero brothers became regulars in the RC Narbonne team. Laurent, Walter and Claude were all club captains during their career, which meant that for some fifteen years the armband of the club was carried only by one of the Spanghero brother.

Ten years captain of the club, Spanghero fail to win any championship, losing his only final in 1974 on a Béziers drop at the siren. He won three Challenge Yves du Manoir in 1968, 1973 and 1974, and one Challenge Antoine-Béguère in 1966. He leave Narbonne in 1974 to play in Toulouse for two season.

He gain in 1966 and 1975 the Midi Olympique Oscar, designating the best French player in the championship.

== Other Activities ==
Playing in a non-professional era, Spanghero worked in a Carcassonne bank, then he created a car location company.

In 1995, he was commissioned by the French Rugby Federation to work on the professional status of players. He urged the president Bernard Lapasset to divide funding into three thirds, one for the players, the second for the clubs and the third for the training clubs. The project was modified in his absence, and he withdrew. A member of the federation's executive committee, he did not stand for re-election in April 1995.

In 1999, he was a consultant to the newspaper l'Humanité during the World Cup.

From 2001 to 2004, he was a Toulouse city councillor in charge of security.

== Style of play ==
A lock at the beginning, Walter Spanghero quickly show a great polyvalence on all forward position, from number 8 to winger. His size and strength make him one of the most powerful forwards in the French team history. He also possessed dexterous hand, was very mobile and had a high rugby IQ. With his devastatingly effective tackles, he works behind the scenes in defence to the benefit of his team. He tried to react as little as possible to provocations and blows he receives. As a result, he earned the nickname "Iron Man" from the South Africans. Walter Spanghero works on his physical condition on a daily basis, not hesitating to run 10 kilometers in summer, returning home in a car deliberately left out in the sun. His work ethic give him a starter spot in his club and national selection for all of his career. Colin Meads, a New Zealand international, admires him: "He's a clean player who's on the ball all the time, good at line-outs and hard as teck". In his first autobiography, Welsh international Mervyn Davies includes him in his XV Wales - World selection.
