= Horsegate =

Horsegate can either mean:

- The News International phone hacking scandal based on the revelation that British Prime Minister David Cameron had ridden a horse loaned to former News of the World editor, Rebekah Brooks by the Metropolitan Police.

or

- The 2013 horse meat contamination scandal – Horsegate was one of the names given to the 2013 meat scare, in which horsemeat was found in prepared frozen meat products and ready meals that were said to contain beef. Also known as the "Horsemeatgate" and "Findusgate", after one of the companies that made the ready meals.
