= Nicolas Spanghero =

French rugby union player (born 1976)

Nicolas Spanghero (born 21 October 1976) is a French rugby union player. He plays as a lock.

He is nephew of former international, Walter Spanghero and Claude Spanghero. He represented Harlequins in the Guinness Premiership and now plays for Colomiers in the French Pro D2. He has played for France A.
