= Findus =

Frozen food brand

- Product type: Frozen food
- Current owner: Nomad Foods (Nordic countries, France, Italy, Spain, Switzerland, Belgium, UK and Australia)
- Country: Sweden
- Introduced: 1945; 81 years ago
- Markets: Europe and Australia
- Previous owners: Nestlé; Unilever
- Website: www.findus.com

Findus (/ˈfɪndəs/; Swedish: [ˈfɪndɵs]) is a Swedish frozen food brand which was founded in 1945. Findus products include ready meals, peas and Crispy Pancakes, the latter of which were invented in the early 1970s.

The Swiss food company Nestlé owned the Findus brand from 1962 to 2000; it sold the rights to the brand in most of Europe (except in Italy where it was owned by Unilever) in 2000 whilst retaining ownership in Switzerland (later under Froneri) until 2021. Through a number of acquisitions, the brand in Scandinavia, France, Italy, Spain and Switzerland is now owned by Nomad Foods.

In June 2015, Iglo Group was purchased by Nomad Foods. Nomad followed this in November 2015 with the purchase of Findus' European business, with the exception of Findus UK and Young's, which remain under the ownership of Lion Capital and its partners. Young's confirmed in February 2016 that it intended to rebrand Findus in the UK.

Young's later sold Findus UK to Nomad Foods for £500 million.

== History ==
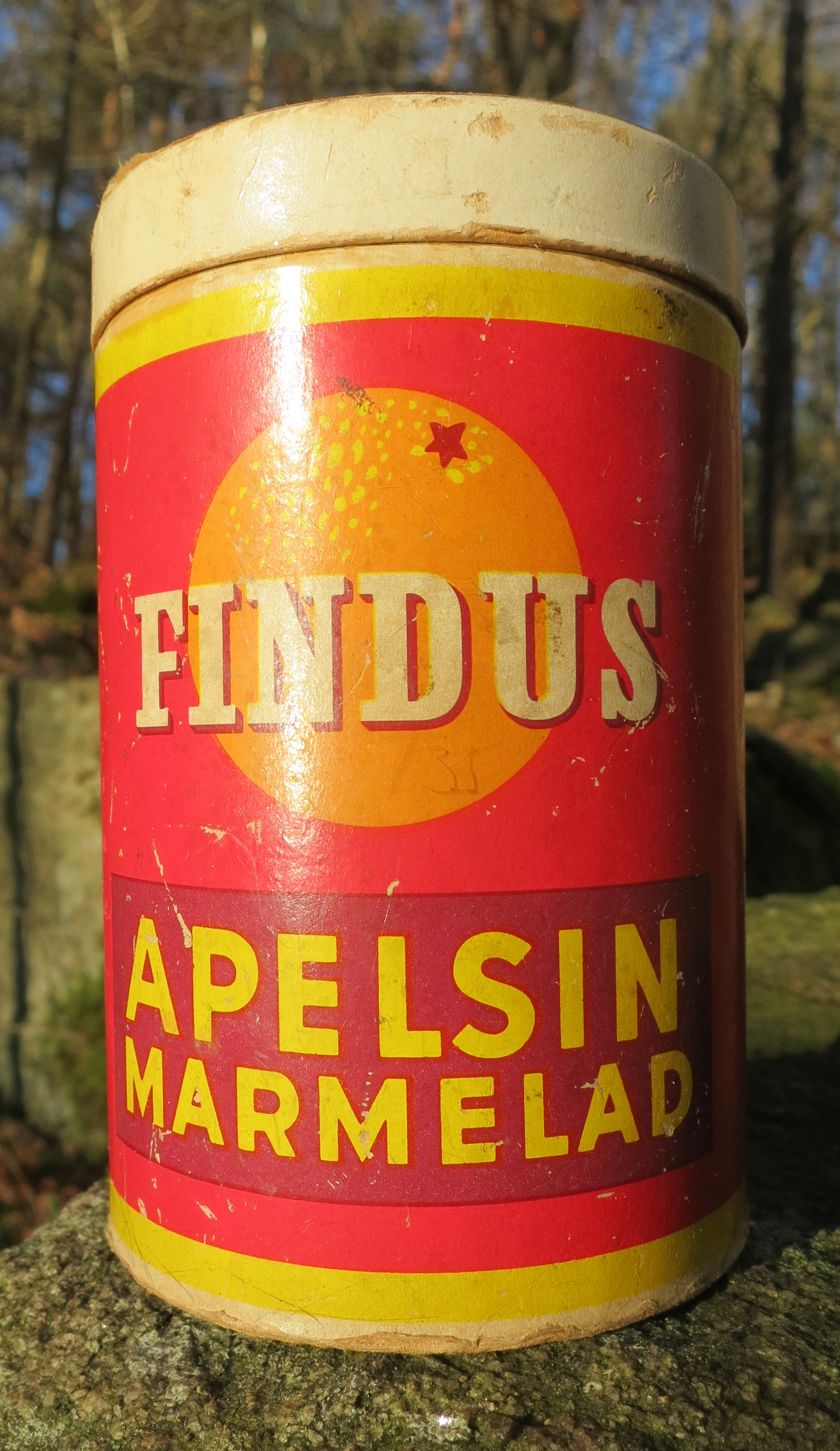
Findus orange marmalade from the 1950s

The origins of the Findus brand date back to the founding of Skånska Frukt- vin- & Likörfabriken (Scanian Fruit, Wine and Liqueur Factory) in Bjuv, Sweden, in 1905. In 1941 this company was acquired by the confectionery manufacturer Freja Marabou and was subsequently renamed Findus Canning Factory. In 1945 the first Findus-branded deep-frozen food products went on sale in Sweden, produced in a small factory in Scania. Findus products were exported to an increasing number of European countries in the late 1950s, including the United Kingdom in 1958.

In 1962, Findus Co. was acquired by the Swiss food and beverage company Nestlé. In 1963, The Swiss food and beverage company Nestlé and the Anglo-Dutch consumer goods company Unilever formed a frozen foods joint venture in Italy, which sold products under the Findus name.

In the 1970s, famed film director Orson Welles provided narration for a series of Findus television commercials that aired in the UK. Outtakes from the recordings sessions (in which Welles complained about the quality of the advertising copy, argued with the director, and ultimately stormed out of the recording booth) have become known colloquially as the Frozen Peas recordings. The Findus Flag logo was adopted in 1971.

Unilever acquired Nestle's stake in the joint venture in 1985, giving it full ownership of the Findus brand in Italy. The Findus Lean Cuisine range was launched by Nestlé in 1987.

In 1998, Nestlé announced that it intended to discontinue the Findus brand in the UK in favour of its Crosse & Blackwell name. The plan was dropped when Swedish firm EQT AB purchased the Findus brand in Scandinavia, France, Spain and the UK from Nestlé in 1999.

Geir Frantzen, a former senior manager at Findus AB, bought out the UK company in April 2005 from EQT. EQT sold the rest of the Findus business (excluding Italy and Switzerland) to CapVest Limited in January 2006, which subsequently created FoodVest as a holding company for Findus and Young's Seafood. In July 2008 FoodVest, including Findus, was purchased by the British private equity firm, Lion Capital LLP. FoodVest was renamed Findus Group in 2009. On 6 January 2009, a fire broke out at the British Findus factory, devastating much of the building. Newcastle Production, owners of the factory, entered in the administration with Zolfo Cooper on 12 January, leading to 359 redundancies.

Unilever later sold Findus Italy to Permira in 2010.

In June 2011 it was announced that Findus Group would take back direct responsibility for sales and marketing of the Findus brand in Spain, which it had previously licensed to Ardo in 2005. In November 2015, Findus in all markets excluding the UK was sold to Nomad Foods, former Nomad Holding, which had already purchased Iglo Group, former Birds Eye, in June that year. Findus' UK operations remained alongside Young's under the ownership of investors led by Lion Capital. In February 2016, Young's confirmed it would discontinue use of the Findus brand in the UK, replacing it with Chef's Classic and Original Pancake Co.

Froneri later sold Findus Switzerland to Nomad Foods Europe for approximately €110 million in 2021, unifying Birds Eye/Iglo/Findus ownership in continental Europe.

== Products ==
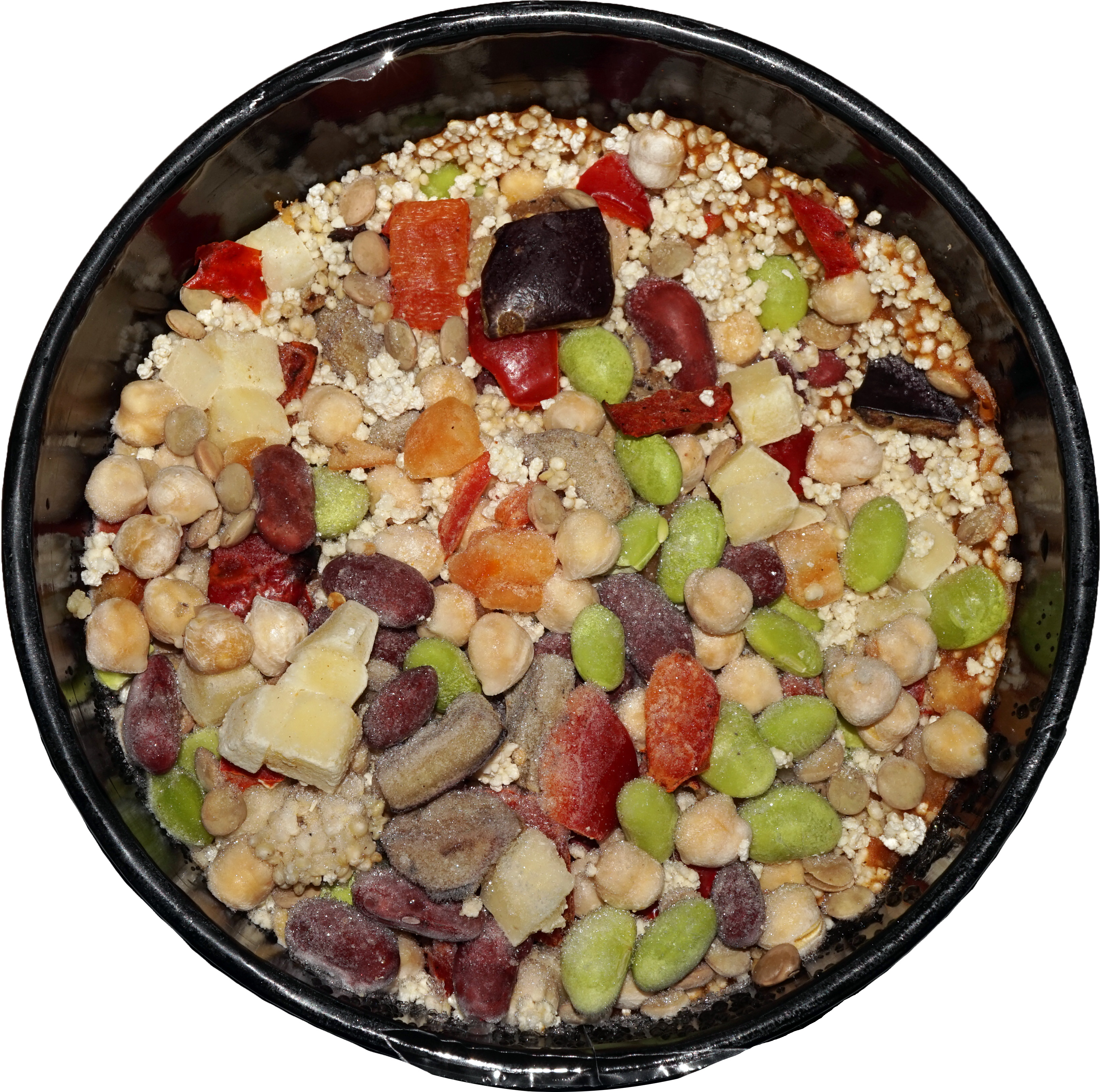
Frozen bean meal by Findus

The Italian Findus range includes 4 Salti in Padella (literally "four jumps in a pan", Italian for "stir frying"), a microwavable or easy cooking version of classic Italian dishes, such as amatriciana and tagliatelle al ragù.

=== Crispy Pancakes ===
Crispy Pancakes is the name of a brand of frozen savoury pancakes containing various fillings and are coated with breadcrumbs. The pancakes were first introduced in 1958.

Past fillings include cheddar cheese, chicken and bacon, chicken and sweetcorn and chicken and mushroom (these were being phased out in November 2001 and finally discontinued in 2002).

They have been made available again since 2019 under the Birds Eye branding. Flavours include mozzarella, tomato and mozzarella, ham and mozzarella, and minced beef and onion.

Crispy pancakes, packaged in Britain, are sold in the United Kingdom and Ireland in most major supermarkets.

In Italy, they were historically made and packed in the Sagit factory in Cisterna Di Latina and are known as Sofficini ("soft ones, fluffy ones") and are described as mozzarella and cheese, tomato and mozzarella, mozzarella and spinach or cheese and ham.

The chef Hugh Fearnley-Whittingstall re-created Findus Crispy Pancakes on his television show River Cottage in November 2009. Fearnley-Whittingstall stated in an article in The Times in 2009 that he loved Findus Crispy Pancakes as a child.

=== Crostinos ===
Fish Finger that contains chips coating instead of breadcrumbs. Popular during the late 1980s and early 1990s.

== Sponsorships ==
Findus were previously sponsors of the former 2nd tier of British ice hockey the British National League. They also sponsored English football club Grimsby Town between 1979 and 1984.

== 2013 horse meat scandal ==
On 7 February 2013, it was revealed that the Findus beef lasagne range in the UK, France and Sweden and the shepherd's pie and moussaka ranges in France contained horse meat without proper declaration. The contamination may have gone on since summer 2012 according to a leaked document. Out of 18 products, 11 tested positive for horse meat. It was also revealed that some of the products sold had minced meat declared as beef that actually was 60–100% horse meat. The source of the horse meat was a third party supplier of Comigel, the producer of the lasagne. According to the Food Standards Agency (FSA), the company had been alerted by a third-party French supplier on 4 February 2013 and tested its beef lasagne products finding over 50% of the tested products contained horse meat. According to reports, both Findus UK and the French supplier withdrew all products related to the third party supplier. It is thought the reason for the contamination is "highly likely" to have been criminal activity.

On 8 February 2013, Findus UK published a public apology on their website, also announcing that, following DNA testing, 3 of its products were found to contain horse tissue. These are the 320, 350 and 500-gramme packages of Findus Beef Lasagne and the company offered a refund for products purchased. In Sweden, Findus Sverige AB also announced a recall of its 375 gram packs of ready-made single portion lasagne (code 63957) and published a contact number for customers who had already purchased the products.

The horse meat is thought to have been introduced via a Romanian abattoir that delivered the meat to a trader in the Netherlands. They were contracted by a Cypriot trader who sold the frozen meat to Spanghero. The meat was then sent to Comigel who makes the end consumer product. The French authority DGCCRF (Directorate General for Competition, Consumer affairs and Repression of Fraud) inspected Spanghero on Friday 8 February and was able to review the traceability of documents for the concerned batches on the past 4 months, which attests of the conformity of Spanghero's procedures. The French fraud office, the DGCCRF investigation is going on, and inspectors are visiting both the Comigel and Spanghero plants. The investigation's results should be known on 14 February and they will determine the fraud source. Spanghero is working jointly with the authorities on this investigation. Public health scientists suspect the horse meat may contain traces of bute which is harmful to humans in large amounts.

Spanghero had to withdraw 12 tonnes of mince in June 2011, because of suspected contamination by E.coli, which causes potentially fatal food poisoning. This contamination happened to be a false alarm. Spanghero products did not contain E. coli and the French authority DGCCRF cleared Spanghero on 22 June 2011.

In a public letter later that day, 11 firms, including Tesco and Asda, said they shared shoppers' "anger and outrage". Whitbread vowed to remedy the unacceptable situation on 26 February. The FSA's chief executive, Catherine Brown also said "it is unlikely we will ever know" how many unwittingly ate horse meat. In 2016, all Findus products were removed from UK supermarkets. In 2019, a new recipe and name were introduced for Findus' crispy pancakes.

Findus was not the only perpetrator, as Compass Group, the world's biggest catering firm, Sodexo the French contract caterer to hospitals, schools and defence sites and Whitbread, Britain's biggest hotel and hospitality group, were also indicted for illegally selling concealed horse meat in food products.
