= À la Table de Spanghero =

French meat processing company

- Company type: Privately held company; formerly Société Anonyme
- Industry: Meat processing
- Founded: Castelnaudary, France (1970)
- Founder: Claude and Laurent Spanghero
- Headquarters: Castelnaudary, France
- Key people: Barthélémy Aguerre (President)
- Operating income: €65,000,000 (2011)
- Number of employees: 360
- Parent: Lur Berri (through Poujol)
- Website: a-la-table-de-spanghero.fr

À la Table de Spanghero, commonly known as Spanghero, is a French meat processing company based in Castelnaudary, Aude. Products include sausages, cassoulet, minced meat, and ready meals. The Lur Berri cooperative owns 99% of the company through its holding Poujol.

== History ==
The company was founded in 1970 as Spanghero SA in Castelnaudary by Claude and Laurent Spanghero, two former French international rugby players. In the 1990s, it was being run by Laurent, Claude and Guy Spanghero. In 2009, the Lur Berri cooperative acquired a 90% stake in Spanghero through its holding Poujol. In 2011, the company name was changed to À la Table de Spanghero, and by June 2012 executives Laurent, David and Jean-Marc Spanghero had all left the company. In February 2013, Lur Berri owned 99% of Spanghero.

== Scandals ==
In June 2011 the company had to withdraw 12 tonnes of mince because of suspected contamination by E.coli, which causes potentially fatal food poisoning. Further analysis showed the absence of pathogenic bacteria.

Spanghero is implicated in the 2013 horse meat contamination scandal, having supplied meat labelled as beef but actually horse to Comigel, which was then used in frozen food products such as lasagne, sold in the United Kingdom, France, Germany and Sweden. The company stated that it had not opened the packages of frozen meat product before sending them on to the Luxembourg factory of the Comigel subsidiary Tavola. The packages had been labelled minerai de bœuf désossé surgelé (origine Roumanie), meaning "frozen boneless beef bulk packs (origin Romania)". Spanghero also said that they wanted to be sure that it was the product that they had supplied that was in question, because they were not Tavola's only supplier.

On 14 February 2013, the French government confirmed that Spanghero knowingly sold horsemeat labelled as beef, and the company's licence was suspended. Spanghero president Barthélémy Aguerre denied the claims and several workers demonstrated against the suspension, while consumer protection minister Benoît Hamon defended the government's decision.

On 18 February, Stéphane Le Foll, Minister of Agriculture, Food and Forestry announced that he had "sufficient evidence" to restore all the company's licences (meat cutting, charcuterie,...) except frozen storage.

In March 2013, food inspectors found 57 tonnes of frozen sheepmeat at Spanghero, that had been imported from the United Kingdom and that included mechanically recovered meat (MSM). MSM is banned in the European Union, as it may contain fragments of bone. Bones of bovines, ovines or caprids may not be imported into EU countries from countries with a risk of spongiform encephalopathies; this includes the UK, following the mad cow disease outbreak of the 1990s, and the prevalence of scrapie among sheep there. Spanghero blamed its supplier Draap (the Dutch word for "horse" reversed) for false labelling.

== A New Start ==
As a result of the scandal, Laurent Spanghero bought back the company, renamed it La Lauragaise, in honour of the region, restored it to viable condition, and then, after a difficult year in which he had to legally protect it from bankruptcy, resold it to CA Holding, a Dutch company, who renamed it l'Occitane Plats Cuisinés.
