= Goophone =

Counterfeit device manufacturer

Goophone 谷峰
- Industry: Consumer electronics, telecommunication
- Headquarters: Shenzhen, China
- Products: Smartphones; Mobile phones Tablet computers

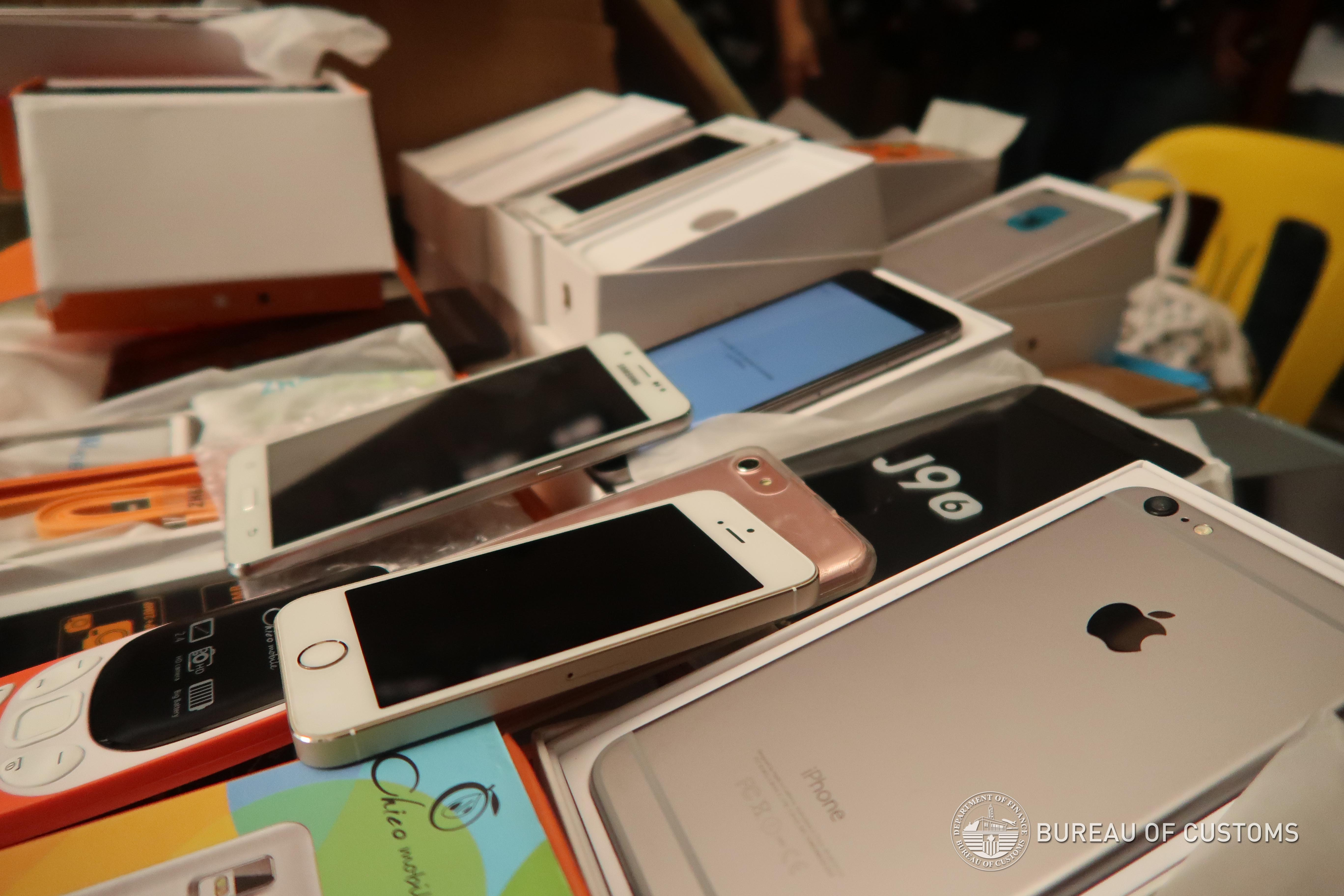
Counterfeit cellphones confiscated by the Philippine Bureau of Customs.

Goophone (simplified Chinese: 谷峰; traditional Chinese: 穀峯; pinyin: gǔ fēng; lit. 'valley peak') is a manufacturer of smartphones, tablets and smart watches based in Shenzhen, China. The company earned notoriety for releasing counterfeit clones of popular high-end smartphones such as the iPhone, Samsung's Galaxy S series and HTC One (M8) using off-the-shelf systems-on-a-chip from MediaTek and the Android operating system, often with user interfaces made to resemble the devices they imitate.

== Patent rights controversy ==
In 2012, Goophone was reported to have filed a patent application for the Goophone i5, a clone of Apple's iPhone 5, prior to the latter device's release. The clone itself was also unveiled before Apple was able to launch the iPhone 5. The company even went so far as to threatening legal action against Apple. Law professor Robin Feldman at UC Hastings expressed concern over China's patent policy, stating in an email interview, "It would be unfortunate if a country's patent system were designed to allow this type of behavior."

Goophone repeated the same strategy later on. In 2017, for instance, it released the Goophone iX before the device it is copying in terms of design—the iPhone X—was released. The device, which had significantly inferior hardware, was sold for around £80/$105 while the iPhone X retailed for $999. By the time Apple announced its iPhone lineup in September 2018, the Goophone XS Max - a copy of the iPhone XS Max - was already being sold at Goophone's website.

== See also ==
- Counterfeit consumer goods
