= IdentiGEN =

Provider of DNA-based analysis and diagnostics

- Company type: Private
- Industry: Biotechnology
- Founded: 1996
- Headquarters: Dublin
- Website: identigen.com

IdentiGEN Ltd. is an Ireland-based company providing DNA-based analysis and diagnostics with operations in Ireland, the UK, North America and Canada. Services include species identification, parentage testing, and a food traceability system.

== History ==
IdentiGEN was founded in 1996 as a spin-out from research conducted at Trinity College, Dublin. Among the first to apply molecular genetic techniques to source-verify meat products, the company pioneered the use of this technology to improve food traceability and supply chain transparency. It differs from track-and-trace systems that rely on metadata and packaging identification.

== See also ==
- 2013 meat adulteration scandal
