= Claude Spanghero =

French rugby union player (born 1948)

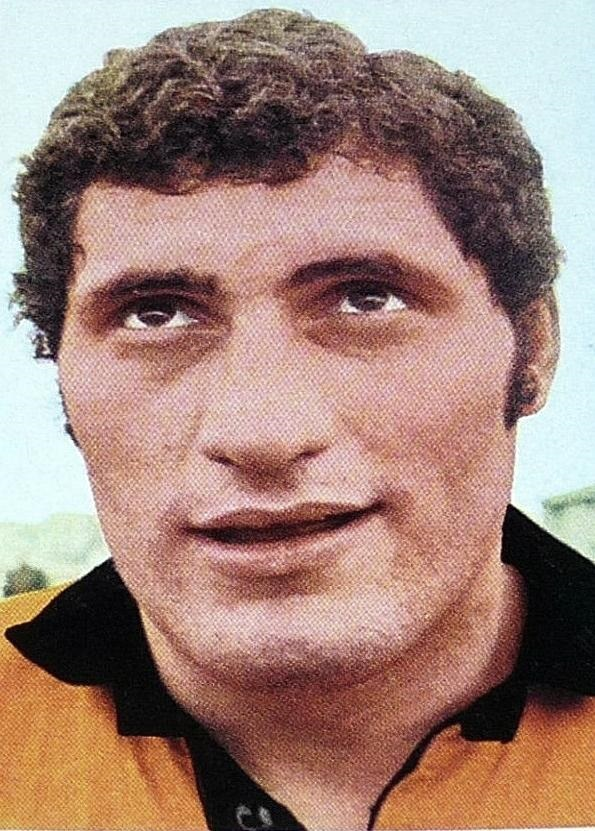
- Spanghero in 1971
- Born: 5 June 1948 (age 78) Payra-sur-l'Hers, France
- Height: 1.96 m (6 ft 5 in)
- Weight: 104 kg (229 lb)
- Notable relative(s): Walter Spanghero; Nicolas Spanghero

Rugby union career
- Position(s): Lock, number eight
Senior career
Years	Team	Apps	(Points)
1965–1980	Narbonne		
1981-1989	RO Castelnaudary		
International career
Years	Team	Apps	(Points)
1971–1975	France	22	(12)

Claude Spanghero (born 5 June 1948) is a former French rugby union footballer. He played at number 8 and as a lock.

He was part of the French side which won the Five Nations in 1973. He played for France 22 times, including 7 with his brother Walter Spanghero. He famously had a very stormy relationship with his older brother, who was also an international rugby player for France.

== Honours ==
- French rugby champion, 1979 with RC Narbonne
- French championship finalist 1974 with RC Narbonne
- Challenge Yves du Manoir 1973, 1974, 1978 and 1979 with RC Narbonne
