= 2013 European aflatoxin contamination =

Food safety incident in Europe

In February–March 2013 several European countries, including Romania, Serbia, Croatia reported nationwide contamination of milk for human consumption (and possibly of derivative products) with aflatoxins. The details are still scarce.

It was reported in March that feed originating from Serbia and imported in the Netherlands and Germany was contaminated. It was also reported in March that tests revealed contamination in milk produced by two Dutch farms. Milk in Germany was also tested but so far has been reported as not tainted. Nevertheless, Russia announced it would ban imports from the German farms that received contaminated feed. On March 20, Romanian farmers dumped milk in protest after the government banned milk from five farms, which remain unnamed. Danone Romania also withdrew some 75 tons of milk products from the shelves.

The European Commission's Rapid Alert System for Food and Feed (RASFF) has reported 10 notifications of aflatoxin B1 in maize of European origin since the last maize harvest in autumn 2012. In the 10 years prior to the last harvest—between 2001 and 2011—a total of nine cases of aflatoxins were reported in maize. Aflatoxins have been mainly an "import problem" up to now. However, global warming is increasingly affecting the mycotoxin map in Europe, producing "tropical toxins" within Europe's borders.

In Serbia the contamination turned into a political scandal after the government raised the internal milk contamination standards to ten times those from the EU. This higher limit, however, is also followed in the United States and two-thirds of the world.

On February 22, The Iowa Department of Agriculture found elevated Aflatoxin concentrations in dog food manufactured at a Pro-Pet facility in Kansas City, KS. The corn component of the dog food was reportedly contaminated with aflatoxins, though the contributing corn load passed screening at the facility. There are no reports of milk contamination in Iowa.

== See also ==
- 2013 meat adulteration scandal
