= EC identification and health marks =

Markings on food products of animal origin in the European Community

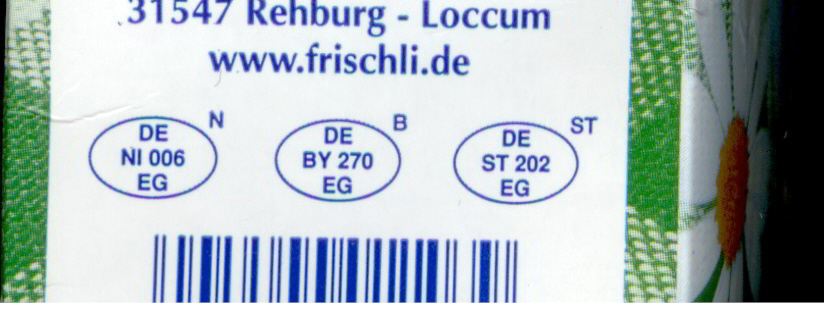
Identification marks on a German Tetrapak milk container

Identification marks and health marks are the oval-shaped markings found on food products of animal origin in the European Community, required by European Union food safety regulations. It identifies the processing establishment that produced and packaged the product and that is therefore responsible for its hygiene status. These marks are meant as a monitoring and tracking aid for food safety and customs inspectors, and each food processing facility dealing with food products of animal origin is required to keep records of its trading partners and their approval numbers (in the case they process said food products), both for buying and selling. The identification and health marks are not an indication for the specific origin of a particular piece of food by themselves, as they do not encode the location of the farm that provided the initial raw product or livestock.

== Regulations ==
The European Union has multiple regulations regarding food safety and quality control in the food industry. These are:

- the EC/852/2004 regulation, regarding general food safety (commonly known as the Food Law),
- the EC/853/2004 regulation, regarding processing and trading of food products of animal origin, and
- the EC/854/2004 regulation, regarding the veterinary and laboratory examination of livestock and meat products.

The EC/853/2004 regulation defines the identification mark (to identify the last plant or facility which processed the item), and the EC/854/2004 regulation defines the health mark (to identify the slaughterhouse for raw meat or the dairy facility for raw milk, the vet's name being optional). The former is in effect only when there is no need for the latter, though they use essentially the same marking style.

== Meaning ==
The identification and health marks contains the following information in an oval:

- the name of the country in which the product was processed, or more commonly a modified version of the corresponding ISO 3166-1 alpha-2 country code (which could be AT, BE, BG, CY, CZ, DE, DK, EE, ES, EL, FR, FI, HU, HR, IE, IT, LT, LU, LV, MT, NL, PL, PT, RO, SE, SI or SK). UK(NI) may be used for products processed in Northern Ireland post-Brexit;
- the national approval number of the facility where the food was processed (the format of the approval number can be country-specific);
- the letters EC for European Community (sometimes also the older EEC for European Economic Community), or their equivalents in other EU languages (for example, EK instead of EC, or EGK instead of EEC), but only if the source materials were produced in/imported from another EC member state.

=== Examples ===
An example of a simple identification mark:

HU
260
EK

Where HU is the country code for Hungary, 260 is the national approval number of a processing facility (in this case, a dairy facility of the company Alföldi Tej), and EK stands for Európai Közösség (European Community in Hungarian).

Another example with a more complex national approval number:

FR
49.099.001
CE

Where FR is the country code for France, 49.099.001 is a complex national approval number, which encodes some geographic data about the facility (49: Maine-et-Loire region, 099: Cholet commune, 001: facility number), and CE stands for Communauté européenne (European Community in French).

== See also ==
- Food safety
- HACCP
- Quality management
