= Food Safety Authority of Ireland =

Irish government agency

- Údarás Sábháilteachta Bia na hÉireann

Agency overview
- Formed: 1 January 1999
- Type: Statutory authority
- Jurisdiction: Ireland
- Headquarters: The Exchange, George's Dock, IFSC, Dublin 1
- Minister responsible: Jennifer Carroll MacNeill, TD, Minister for Health
- Agency executives: Greg Dempsey, Chief Executive; Ann Horan, Chair
- Parent department: Department of Health
- Key document: Food Safety Authority of Ireland Act, 1998

The Food Safety Authority of Ireland (FSAI) (Irish: Údarás Sábháilteachta Bia na hÉireann – USBE) is the statutory body responsible for ensuring food produced, distributed or marketed in Ireland complies with food safety and hygiene standards, best practice codes and legal requirements.

The FSAI was established on 1 January 1999, with the enactment of the Food Safety Authority of Ireland Act, 1998. The chief executive of the FSAI is Greg Dempsey. The FSAI Act empowers the Authority to issue closure orders and prohibition orders on food businesses which do not comply with food safety and hygiene requirements.

== 2013 horse meat scandal ==
The FSAI conducted tests on a sample of frozen beefburgers sold in Irish and British supermarkets in early 2013, and announced on 15 January that the test results had revealed significant quantities of horse meat in several of the products tested. The findings triggered the 2013 meat adulteration scandal, which involved several major food retailers and suppliers in the United Kingdom, France and other European countries.
