= Lur Berri =

- Company type: Food company
- Industry: holding company activities
- Founded: 1936, France

Lur Berri is a cooperative food company in south west France, created in 1936.

== History ==
In 1936, the wheat cooperative was founded. Until 1965, activity was focused on crop production in the Basque Country.

In 1971, the agricultural cooperative Lur Berri was born from a merger between grain cooperatives in the Basque Country and Lower Navarre.

From the 1980s, the cooperative grew quickly. It moved into livestock production (cattle, sheep, pigs and poultry) and acquired a number of cereal wholesalers: Bonnut, Garlin, Espoey, Artix, Clermont, and Coarraze-Nay. The group Lur Berri has been active in the Pyrénées-Atlantiques, Landes, Hautes-Pyrénées, and most recently, the Tarn-et-Garonne.

Lur Berri's mission is to "assure our farmer partners the best value of their products".

== 2013 meat adulteration scandal ==
On 14 February 2013, the French government confirmed that Spanghero, a French prepared meat producer of which Lur Berri owns 99%, knowingly sold horse meat labelled as beef in the 2013 meat adulteration scandal, and the company's licence was suspended while investigations continued.
