= Payra-sur-l'Hers =

Commune in Occitanie, France

- Commune
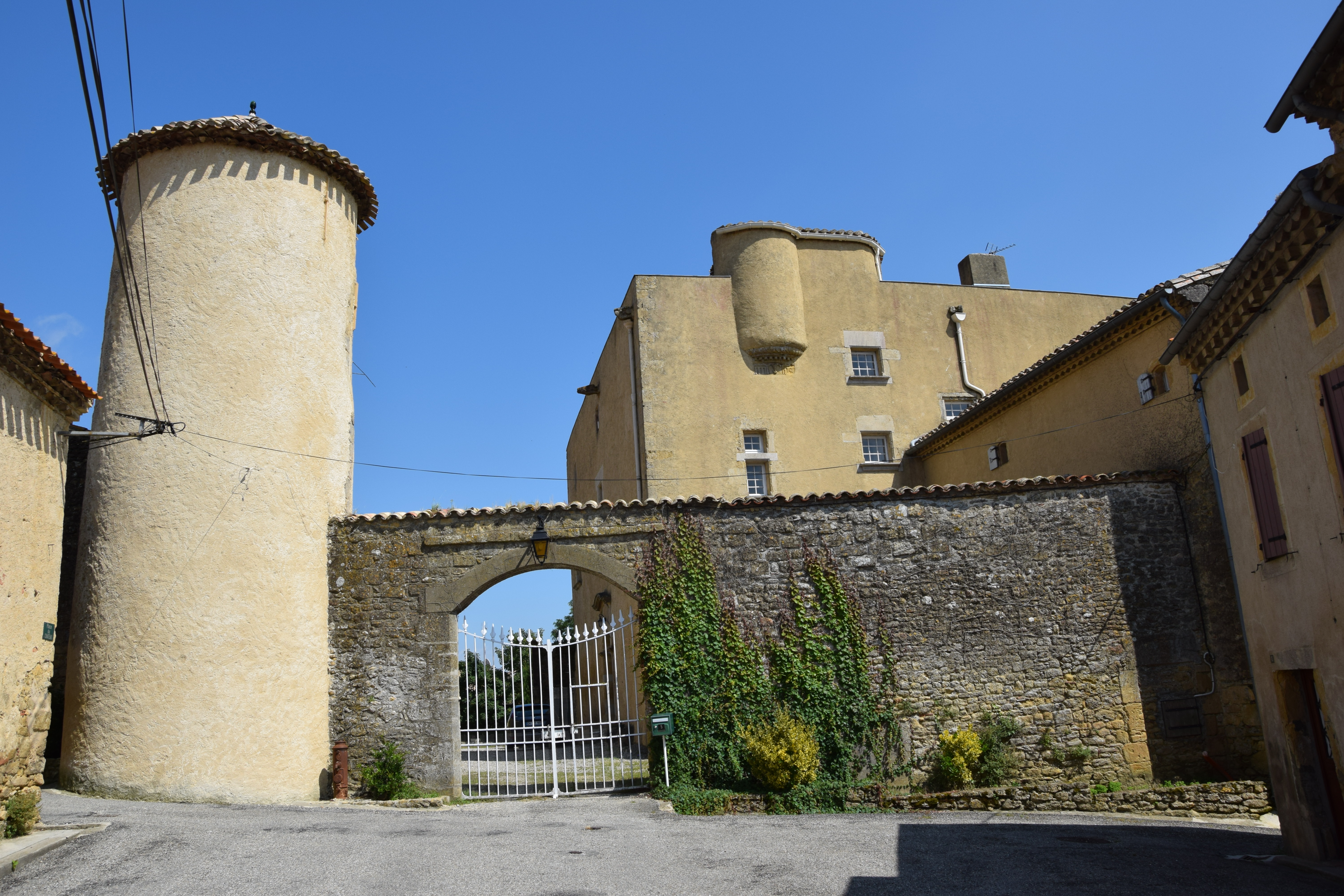
- The chateau in Payra-sur-l'Hers

- Coat of arms
- Location of Payra-sur-l'Hers
- Location within France Location within Occitanie
- Coordinates: 43°16′N 1°52′E
- Country: France
- Region: Occitania
- Department: Aude
- Arrondissement: Carcassonne
- Canton: La Piège au Razès
- Intercommunality: Castelnaudary Lauragais Audois

Government
  - Mayor (2020–2026): Bernard Pech
- Area^{1}: 24.52 km^{2} (9.47 sq mi)
- Elevation: 250 m (820 ft)
- Highest elevation: 362 m (1,188 ft)
- Lowest elevation: 237 m (778 ft)
- Population (2023): 210
  - Density: 8.6/km^{2} (22/sq mi)
- Time zone: UTC+01:00 (CET)
  - Summer (DST): UTC+02:00 (CEST)
- INSEE/Postal code: 11275 /11410
- ^{1} French Land Register data, which excludes lakes, ponds, glaciers > 1 km^{2} (0.386 sq mi or 247 acres) and river estuaries.

Payra-sur-l'Hers (French pronunciation: [pɛʁa syʁ lɛʁs], literally Payra on the Hers; Occitan: Pairan) is a commune in the Aude department in southern France.

== Population ==
Historical population
Year	Pop.	±% p.a.
1968	206	—
1975	192	−1.00%
1982	184	−0.61%
1990	158	−1.89%
1999	177	+1.27%
2007	154	−1.72%
2012	187	+3.96%
2017	205	+1.86%
2023	210	+0.40%
Source: INSEE

== See also ==
- Communes of the Aude department
