= Tavola =

Tavola may refer to:

- Kaliopate Tavola (born 1946), Fijian economist, diplomat, politician and Minister for Foreign Affairs
- Roberto Tavola (born 1957), retired Italian professional football player

== See also ==
- Gran Tavola (Italian for "Great Table") was the largest Sienese bank, and one of the most powerful banks in Europe from 1255 to 1298
- In music, the belly of a Sound board (music)
