= Animal passport =

Animal passport may refer to:

- Common Veterinary Entry Document
- Pet passport
- Horse passport
