= Airlog =

AIRLOG is a European Union FP7 project that was scheduled to run from 1 February 2012 to 31 January 2014. The aim of AIRLOG was to develop technology that would assist auditors of indoor air quality (IAQ) and educate the public about IAQ. AIRLOG was to also create an integrated platform for IAQ audit management. As such, the project was to provide best practice digital guide for the European Union.

== Background ==
Air pollution is of concern in Europe because it may impair health and damage the environment. Long term exposure to air polluted with fine particles in Europe, especially that from proximity to traffic, is associated with deaths from natural causes and low birth weight (but not necessarily with non-malignant respiratory deaths). In the EU, it is estimated to cost the healthcare system 1 million euros per year (nine percent of the EU Gross Domestic Product (GDP). and 2.2 million disability-adjusted life years (DALYs) are lost due to poor indoor air quality; it is estimated that 30% of those who spend a majority of their time within EU buildings suffer from Sick Building Syndrome (SBS).

Although, from a global perspective, harmful indoor air pollution is caused by cooking and heating with solid fuels on open fires or traditional stoves, especially in poorly ventilated rooms, indoor air pollutants may also come from heating and cooling equipment, electronic appliances, cleaning products, air fresheners, insecticides, and construction materials.

Accurately determining risk associated with exposure to indoor air pollution and controlling indoor air quality with regulatory instruments is difficult. Audits of Indoor Air Quality (IAQ) may assist in lessening risk to the health of people, help to improve productivity and support the use energy efficiency equipment and methods in buildings. To meet these goals, the European Commission's (EC) Scientific Committee on Health and Environmental Risks (SCHER) ruled that the EU should conduct a comprehensive review of existing data on pollutants of indoor air and begin recording data in a database.

== Difficulties in the IAQ audit process ==
AIRLOG proposed to make a web-based audit management platform that would make audits less expensive, more accurate and easier to understand. The platform would include a Decision Support System that would use previously entered data to determine actions in improving IAQ that would eventually become best practice. The platform would also take into consideration the need for sustainable building design, efficient use of energy and other green elements.

An audit of IAQ is not a simple process for a number of reasons. The assessment must include measures of factors such as inefficient heating and air conditioning, growth of mould in moist areas, and the presence of volatile organic compounds (VOCs) from cleaning agents and objects such as new furniture. The IAQ audit may encounter unknown variables that influence its cost, time, and accuracy. In addition, each building is different in size, configuration, and exposure to air pollutants. The creation of an accurate IAQ audit must come from the combined efforts of engineers, chemists, health professionals, architects, building managers, maintenance personnel, building owners and consumers. IAQ auditors need to be trained and accredited in order to give a building an official certification.

== Elements of an IAQ audit ==
An IAC audit can be divided into two parts. One part is about the level of comfort experienced in a building and the other is about measures of IAQ. Levels of comfort in a building are determined by factors such as temperature, humidity, air velocity, air renewal, and ventilation pressure. The second part, the IAQ, is determined by factors such as inorganic toxic gases, VOCs, particulate matter (PM10), electromagnetic fields and radiation, and microbiological contaminants (fungi and bacteria such as Legionella).

The audit is taken in steps. An initial assessment involves the collecting of information about the building and its ventilation and air conditioning (HVAC); its critical points; and its possible sources of contamination. This is done through visual inspection. Then, there is the standardised measurement and analysis of factors such as certain chemicals and microbes. This is done by collecting samples for laboratory analysis. A third step is researching possible corrective actions.

== Problems to overcome ==
AIRLOG aimed to create software to assist field engineers in audits of IAQ in buildings in the EU. It also aimed to develop an integrated management platform that could become more effective as data was entered. Thus, testing of IAQ in an individual building would be aligned with the monitoring of IAQ across the EU.

The problems in IAQ auditing that were to be overcome included: inefficient planning of audits, overdue reports, incompleteness, lack of transparency in reporting audit progress and slow accumulation of results for monitoring. They also included: risk of errors due to manual data entry, the generation of unreliable alerts, bulk data loss from Excel files and paper-based documents, delay or failure to implement the necessary corrective actions, and non-standardized auditing practices by building type, use and state. In addition, AIRLOG was challenged with considering the efficient use of energy and the training of IAQ experts in standard methodologies.

== Sources and use of data ==
AIRLOG aimed to integrate a number of data sources. These included: measurements from sensors; laboratory analysis; maintenance reports from building managers; and governmental and legislative decisions. AIRLOG planned to manage these sources of data using a platform based on Web 3.0. The platform would use artificial intelligence to automatically learn and propose actions for mitigation and control through the use of a risk simulation tool.

== Legal framework ==
In its resolution of 4 September 2008, relating to the mid-term review of the European Agency for Health and Action Plan 2004–2010 (2007/2252 (INI)), the European parliament called on the EC to propose directives to address the following:

"Special attention to those vulnerable groups most susceptible to pollutants, by introducing measures to reduce exposure to indoor environmental contaminants in schools and health centres through the adoption of good practices to manage the quality of indoor air; specific measures on indoor air quality, to establish a high level of health protection and internal security, in particular...regarding construction products, to propose measures to increase energy efficiency of buildings and for the security and safety of chemicals used in equipment and furnishings; and minimum requirements for newly constructed buildings, to ensure adequate indoor air quality."

The resolution recommended that the EC encourage member states to improve IAQ through tax and other financial concessions and to reduce exposure to electromagnetic radiation in official buildings. Action 12 of the EU Environment and Health Action Plan 2004–2012 called for the development of ways to address factors affecting IAQ such as moisture, mould, building materials, consumer products, and indoor activities. Special focus would be placed on the IAQ of buildings used by people most at risk, the young, the sick and the elderly, for example schools and health centres.

== Economic impact ==
In June 2010, an EU conference, "Product Policy and Indoor Air Quality", concluded that attention to IAQ would improve work performance, reduce absenteeism and reduce need for medical care and therefore have economic impact. Furthermore, the standardised testing, certification and labelling of indoor products that gave VOC emissions would facilitate international trade and reduce trade barriers within the 28 EU member states.

== Notes ==
- CEN standard TC 264 - WG 9: Quality assurance of automated measuring systems
- CEN standard TC 264 - WG 26: Indoor air emissions of building materials.
- Decree law 78/2006: National energy certification system and indoor air quality in buildings. (Portugal)
- International Society of Indoor Air Quality and Climate (ISIAQ-NL) and Eco-Counselling Europe. (Netherlands)
- New Jersey Indoor air quality standard: NJAC 12:100-13, 2007.
