= Horse meat =

Consumable meat from horses

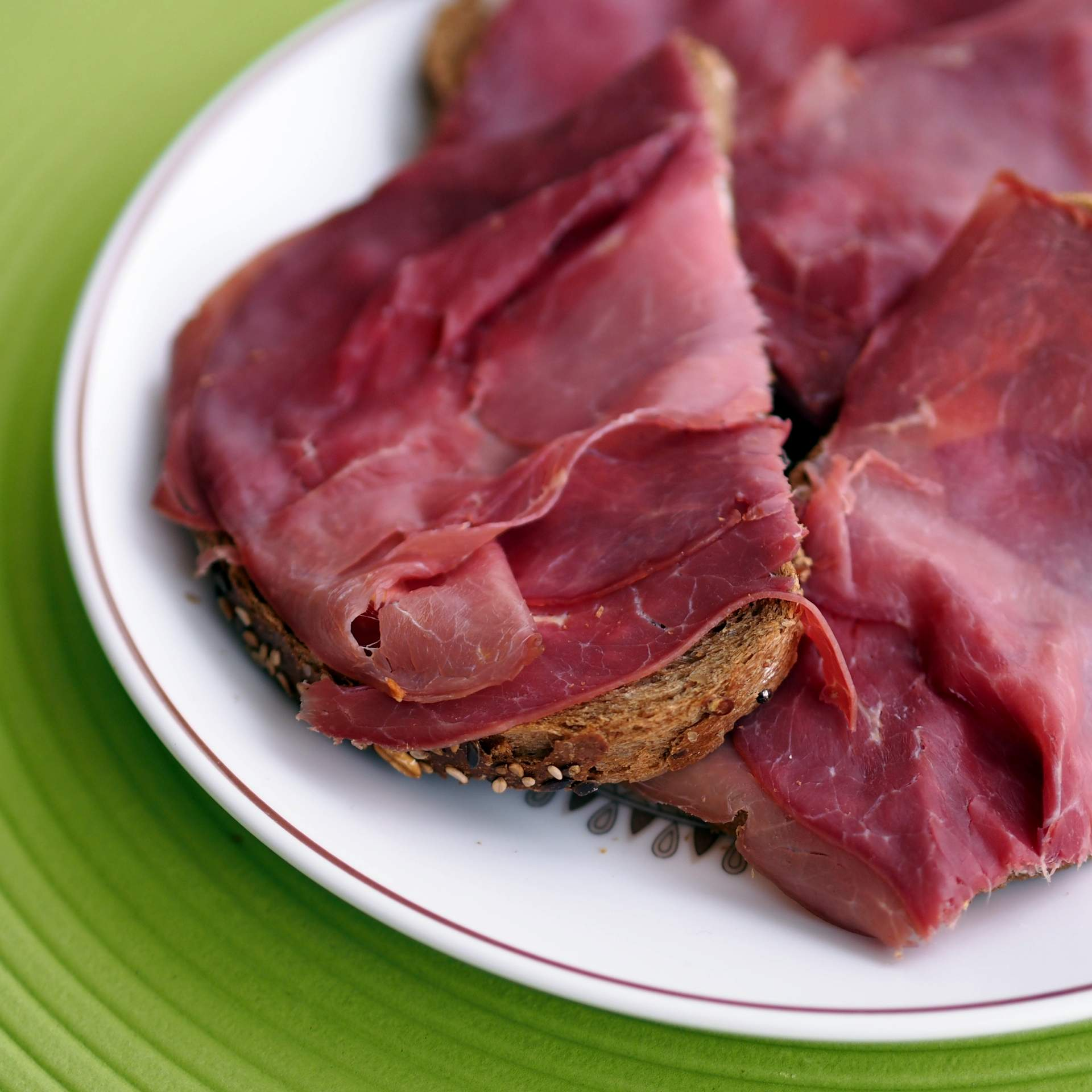
- Paardenrookvlees (Dutch-style smoked and salted horse meat) on bread
- Type: Meat

The consumption of horse meat, also known as hippophagy, forms a significant part of the culinary traditions of many countries, particularly in Europe and Asia.

The eight countries that consume the most horse meat consume the meat from about 4.3 million horses a year. For the majority of humanity's early existence, wild horses were hunted as a source of protein.

== History ==
Archaic humans hunted wild horses for hundreds of thousands of years following their first arrival in Eurasia. Examples of sites demonstrating horse butchery by archaic humans include: the Boxgrove site in southern England dating to around 500,000 years ago, where horse bones with cut marks (with a horse scapula possibly exhibiting a spear wound) are associated with Acheulean stone tools made by Homo heidelbergensis; the Schöningen site in Germany (also thought to have been created by Homo heidelbergensis) dating to around 300,000 years ago, where butchered horses are associated with wooden spears (the Schöningen spears, amongst the oldest known wooden spears); as well as the Lingjing site in Henan, China, dating to 125–90,000 years ago. During the Upper Palaeolithic, there is evidence for the hunting of horses by modern humans in Europe, as well as Asia. Paleoindians, the first humans to inhabit the Americas, hunted the continents' native horses shortly prior to their extinction.

In many parts of Europe, the consumption of horse meat continued throughout the Middle Ages until modern times, despite a ban on horse meat by Pope Gregory III in 732. Horse meat was also eaten as part of Germanic pagan religious ceremonies in Northern Europe. In the 15th and 16th centuries, Spaniards, followed by other European settlers, reintroduced horses to the Americas. Some horses became feral, and began to be hunted by the indigenous Pehuenche people of what is now Chile and Argentina. Initially, early humans hunted horses as they did other game; later, they began to raise them for meat, milk, and transport. The meat was, and still is, preserved by being sun-dried in the high Andes into a product known as charqui.

France dates its taste for horse meat to the Revolution. With the fall of the aristocracy, its auxiliaries had to find new means of subsistence. The horses formerly maintained by the aristocracy as a sign of prestige ended up being used to alleviate the hunger of the masses. During the Napoleonic campaigns, the surgeon-in-chief of Napoleon's Grand Army, Baron Dominique-Jean Larrey, advised the starving troops to eat the meat of horses. At the siege of Alexandria, the meat of young Arab horses relieved an epidemic of scurvy. At the battle of Eylau in 1807, Larrey served horse as soup and as bœuf à la mode. At Aspern-Essling (1809), cut off from the supply lines, the cavalry used the breastplates of fallen cuirassiers as cooking pans and gunpowder as seasoning, thus founding a practice that carried on until at least the Waterloo campaign.

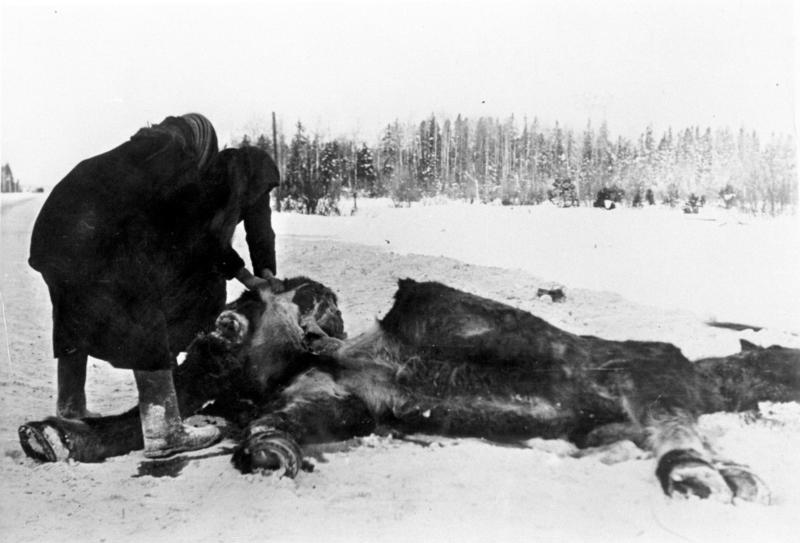
Hunger during World War II led to horses being eaten.

Horse meat gained widespread acceptance in French cuisine during the later years of the Second French Empire. The high cost of living in Paris prevented many working-class citizens from buying meat such as pork or beef. In 1866, the French government legalized the eating of horse meat, and the first butcher's shop specializing in horse meat opened in eastern Paris, providing quality meat at lower prices.

During the Siege of Paris (1870–1871), horse meat, along with the meat of donkeys and mules, was eaten by anyone who could afford it, partly because of a shortage of fresh meat in the blockaded city, and also because horses were eating grain that was needed by the human populace. Though large numbers of horses were in Paris (estimates suggested between 65,000 and 70,000 were butchered and eaten during the siege), the supply was ultimately limited. Not even champion racehorses were spared (two horses presented to Napoleon III of France by Alexander II of Russia were slaughtered), but the meat became scarce. Many Parisians gained a taste for horse meat during the siege, and after the war ended, horse meat remained popular. Likewise, in other places and times of siege or starvation, horses are viewed as a food source of last resort.

Despite the general Anglophone taboo, horse and donkey meat was eaten in Britain, especially in Yorkshire, until the 1930s, and, in times of postwar food shortages, surged in popularity in the United States and was considered for use as hospital food. A 2007 Time magazine article about horse meat brought to the United States from Canada described the meat as "a sweet, rich, superlean, oddly soft meat, and closer to beef than to venison".

== Nutrition ==
Horse meat has a slightly sweet taste reminiscent of beef. Many consumers say they are unable to tell the difference between beef and horse meat.

Meat from younger horses tends to be lighter in color, while older horses produce richer color and flavor, as with most mammals. Horse meat can be used to replace beef, pork, mutton, venison, and any other meat in virtually any recipe. Horse meat is usually very lean. Jurisdictions that allow for the slaughter of horses for food rarely have age restrictions, so many are quite young, some even as young as 16 to 24 months old.

Selected nutrients per 100 g (3.5 oz)
Food source	Energy		Protein (g)	Fat (g)	Iron (mg)	Sodium (mg)	Cholesterol (mg)
Food source	(kJ)	(Cal)	Protein (g)	Fat (g)	Iron (mg)	Sodium (mg)	Cholesterol (mg)
Game meat, horse, raw	560	133	21	5	3.8	53	52
Beef, strip steak, raw	490	117	23	3	1.9	55	55

== Production ==
Ten largest producers of horse meat in 2018
	Country	Number of animals	Production (tonnes)
1.	China	1,589,164	200,452
2.	Kazakhstan	718,027	126,520
3.	Mexico	634,845	83,922
4.	Mongolia	397,271	57,193
5.	Russia	250,248	45,388
6.	United States	114,841	29,275
7.	Canada	127,656	27,395
8.	Brazil	188,531	24,566
9.	Australia	86,244	24,148
10.	Kyrgyzstan	155,177	23,762
	Total	4,262,004	642,621

In most countries where horses are slaughtered for food, they are processed in a similar fashion to cattle, i.e., in large-scale factory slaughter houses (abattoirs) where they are stunned with a captive bolt gun and bled to death. In countries with a less industrialized food-production system, horses and other animals are slaughtered individually outdoors as needed, in or near the village where they will be consumed.

In 2005, the eight principal horse meat-producing countries produced over 700,000 tonnes of it. At that time, the five biggest horse meat-consuming countries were China (421,000 tonnes), Mexico, Russia, Italy, and Kazakhstan (54,000 tonnes).

Horse meat production

Production of horse meat per animal

== Use ==
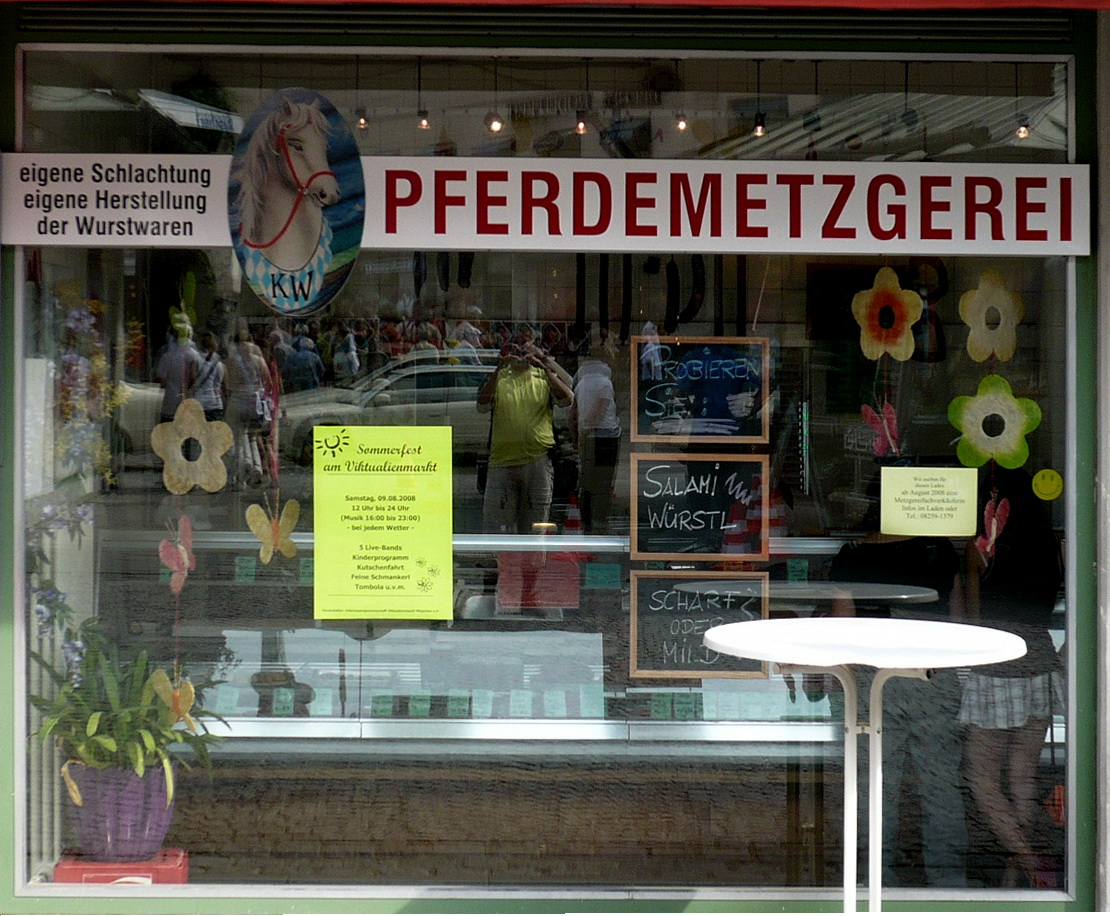
Horse butcher on the Viktualienmarkt in Munich, Germany

As horses are relatively poor converters of grass and grain to meat compared to cattle, in the western countries they are not usually bred or raised specifically for their meat. Instead, horses are slaughtered when their monetary value as riding or work animals is low, but their owners can still make money selling them for horse meat, for example in the routine export of the southern English ponies from the New Forest, Exmoor, and Dartmoor. British law requires the use of "equine passports" even for semiferal horses to enable traceability (also known as "provenance"), so most slaughtering is done in the UK before the meat is exported, meaning that the animals travel as carcasses rather than live. Ex-racehorses, riding horses, and other horses sold at auction may also enter the food chain; sometimes, these animals have been stolen or purchased under false pretenses. Even prestigious horses may end up in the slaughterhouse; the 1986 Kentucky Derby winner and 1987 Eclipse Award for Horse of the Year winner, Ferdinand, is believed to have been slaughtered in Japan, probably for pet food.

A misconception exists that horses are commonly slaughtered for pet food. In many countries, such as the United States, horse meat was outlawed for use in pet food in the 1970s. American horse meat is considered a delicacy in Europe and Japan, and its cost is in line with veal, so it would be prohibitively expensive in many countries for pet food.

Meat from horses that veterinarians have put down with a lethal injection is not suitable for human consumption, as the toxin remains in the meat; the carcasses of such animals are sometimes cremated (most other means of disposal are problematic, due to the toxin). Remains of euthanized animals can be rendered, which maintains the value of the skin, bones, fats, etc., for such purposes as fish food. This is commonly done for lab specimens (e.g., pigs) euthanized by injection. The amount of drug (e.g. a barbiturate) is insignificant after rendering.

Carcasses of horses treated with some drugs are considered edible in some jurisdictions. For example, according to Canadian regulation, hyaluron, used in treatment of particular disorders in horses, in HY-50 preparation, should not be administered to animals to be slaughtered for horse meat. In Europe, however, the same preparation is not considered to have any such effect, and edibility of the horse meat is not affected.

== Attitudes towards horse meat ==
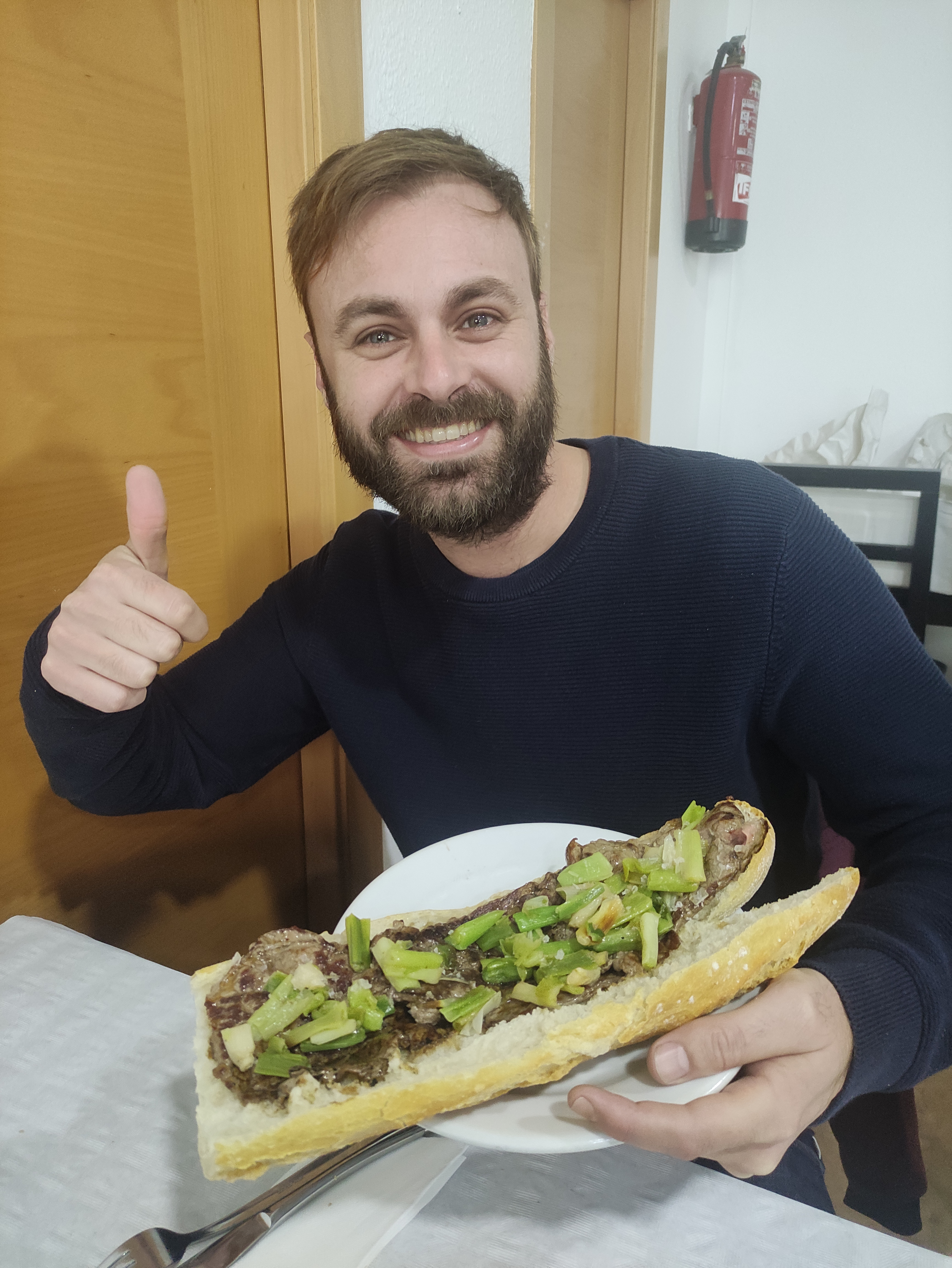
A bocadillo sandwich with horse meat

Horse meat is commonly eaten in many countries in Europe and Asia. It is not a generally available food in some English-speaking countries such as the United Kingdom, South Africa, Australia, the United States, and English Canada. It is also taboo in Brazil, Ireland, Poland and Israel and among the Romani. Horse meat is not generally eaten in Spain, except in the north, but the country exports horses both as live animals and as slaughtered meat for the French and Italian markets. Horse meat is consumed in some North American and Latin American countries, but is illegal in some others. The Food Standards Code of Australia and New Zealand definition of 'meat' does not include horse.

In Tonga, horse meat is eaten nationally, and Tongan emigrants living in the United States, New Zealand, and Australia have retained a taste for it, claiming Christian missionaries originally introduced it to them. This caused a controversy in Salt Lake City in 1983 where M&R Company of Hartford, Connecticut, offered to sell horsemeat to the local Tongan Mormon community who requested them but halted their plans due to strong opposition from other Mormons.

The consumption of horse meat has been common in Central Asian societies, past or present, due to the abundance of steppes suitable for raising horses. In North Africa, while horse meat has been occasionally consumed, it has never been eaten in the Maghreb.

Horse meat is forbidden by Jewish dietary laws because horses are not ruminants and do not have cloven hooves and therefore are not kosher.

In the eighth century, Popes Gregory III and Zachary instructed Saint Boniface, missionary to the Germans, to forbid the eating of horse meat to those he converted, due to its association with Germanic pagan ceremonies. The people of Iceland allegedly expressed reluctance to embrace Christianity for some time, largely over the issue of giving up horse meat. Pope Gregory III's penal law banning horse meat consumption was abrogated by the 1983 Code of Canon Law. Horse meat is now currently consumed in Iceland, and many horses are raised for this purpose. The culturally close people of Sweden still have an ambivalent attitude to horse meat.

Henry Mayhew describes the difference in the acceptability and use of the horse carcass between London and Paris in London Labour and the London Poor (1851). Horse meat was rejected by the British, but continued to be eaten in other European countries such as France and Germany, where knackers often sold horse carcasses despite the papal ban. Even the hunting of wild horses for meat continued in the area of Westphalia. Londoners also suspected that horse meat was finding its way into sausages and that offal sold as that of oxen was, in fact, equine.

While no taboo on eating horse meat exists per se, it is generally considered by ethnic Russians to be a low-quality meat with poor taste, and it is rarely found in stores. It is popular among such historically nomadic peoples as the Bashkirs, Tatars, Kyrgyz, and Kazakhs.

=== Taboos ===
In 732 AD, Pope Gregory III began a concerted effort to stop the ritual consumption of horse meat in pagan practice. While the pope's penal law has been abrogated, in some countries, the effects of this prohibition by the Catholic Church have lingered, and horse meat prejudices have progressed from taboos to avoidance to abhorrence. In a study conducted by Fred Simoons, the avoidance of horse meat in American culture is less likely due to lingering feelings from Gregory's prohibition, but instead due to an unfamiliarity with the meat compared to more mainstream offerings. In other parts of the world, horse meat has the stigma of being something poor people eat and is seen as a cheap substitute for other meats, such as pork and beef. In any case, Pope Gregory's law is no longer in force, so there is no prohibition now for Catholics to eat horse meat (other than on abstinence days).

According to the anthropologist Marvin Harris, some cultures class horse meat as taboo because the horse converts grass into meat less efficiently than ruminants.

Totemistic taboo is also a possible reason for refusal to eat horse meat as an everyday food, but did not necessarily preclude ritual slaughter and consumption. Roman sources state that the goddess Epona was widely worshipped in Gaul and southern Britain. Epona, a triple-aspect goddess, was the protectress of the horse and horse keepers, and horses were sacrificed to her; she was paralleled by the Irish Macha and Welsh Rhiannon. In The White Goddess, Robert Graves argued that the taboo among Britons and their descendants was due to worship of Epona, and even earlier rites. The Uffington White Horse is probable evidence of ancient horse worship. The ancient Indian Kshatriyas engaged in horse sacrifices and horse meat consumption, one of which is Ashwamedha Yajna as recorded in the Vedas and Ramayana and Mahabharata, but in the context of the ritual sacrifice, it is not "killed", but instead smothered to death. Also Ancient Indians consumed horse meat. In 1913, the Finnic Mari people of the Volga region were observed to practice a horse sacrifice.

In ancient Scandinavia, the horse was very important, as a living, working creature, as a sign of the owner's status, and symbolically within Old Norse religion. Horses were slaughtered as a sacrifice to the gods, and the meat was eaten by the people taking part in the religious feasts. When the Nordic countries were Christianized, eating horse meat was regarded as a sign of paganism and prohibited. A reluctance to eat horse meat is common in these countries even today.

=== Opposition to production ===
The killing of horses for human consumption is widely opposed in countries such as the U.S., the UK and Greece where horses are generally considered to be companion and sporting animals only. In ancient Greece horses were revered and horse slaughter was forbidden by law; this is also the case in modern Greece, as horses are considered companions and a symbol of beauty, strength and pride. French former actress and animal rights activist Brigitte Bardot spent years crusading against the eating of horse meat. However, the opposition is far from unanimous; a 2007 readers' poll in the London magazine Time Out showed that 82% of respondents supported chef Gordon Ramsay's decision to serve horse meat in his restaurants.

== Around the world ==
=== South America ===
==== Argentina ====
Argentina is a producer and exporter of horse meat, but it is not used in local consumption and is considered taboo.

==== Chile ====
In Chile, it is used in charqui. Also in Chile, horse meat became the main source of nutrition for the nomadic indigenous tribes, which promptly switched from a guanaco-based economy to a horse-based one after the horses brought by the Spaniards became feral and bred naturally.

Although not nearly as common as beef meat, horse meat can be readily available in some butcheries throughout the country. It is generally less expensive than beef and somewhat associated with lower social strata.

==== Uruguay ====
In Uruguay horses are appreciated for their companionship and horse meat shouldn't be consumed, as it constitutes a taboo that dates back from Spaniard ancestry at colony times. There's a saying that preaches: a lomo de caballo criollo se hizo la patria (on criollo horse back the nation was made). However the country produces horse meat to be exported to France and China. Also a common belief is that horse meat is locally used to make salami. Slaughtering horses are fierce untamed colts.

=== North America ===
==== Canada ====
A small horse meat business exists in Quebec. Horse meat is also for sale in Granville Island Market in Vancouver, where according to a Time reviewer who smuggled it into the United States, it turned out to be a "sweet, rich, superlean, oddly soft meat, closer to beef than venison". Horse meat is also available in high-end Toronto butchers and supermarkets. CBC News reported on March 10, 2013, that horse meat was also popular among some segments of Toronto's population.

Despite this, most of Canada shares the horse meat taboo with the rest of the English-speaking world.

This mentality is especially evident in Alberta, where strong horse racing and breeding industries and cultures have existed since the province's founding, although large numbers of horses are slaughtered for meat in Fort MacLeod, and certain butchers in Calgary do sell it.

In 2013, the consumer protection show Kassensturz of Swiss television SRF reported the poor animal conditions at Bouvry Exports, a Canadian horse meat farm in Fort MacLeod, Alberta. Migros, the primary importer of horse meat into Switzerland, started working with Bouvry to improve their animal welfare, but in 2015 Migros cut ties with Bouvry because though improvements had been made, they had not improved sufficiently. Migros had "set itself the ambitious goal of bringing all suppliers abroad up to the strict Swiss standards by 2020".

==== Mexico ====
As of 2005, Mexico was the second-largest producer of horse meat in the world. By 2009, it became the largest producer of horse meat in the world. While horse meat is produced in Mexico, the practice of eating horse meat is not widely accepted. Domestic consumption is usually attributed to non-human consumption such as carnivorous zoo animals.

==== United States ====
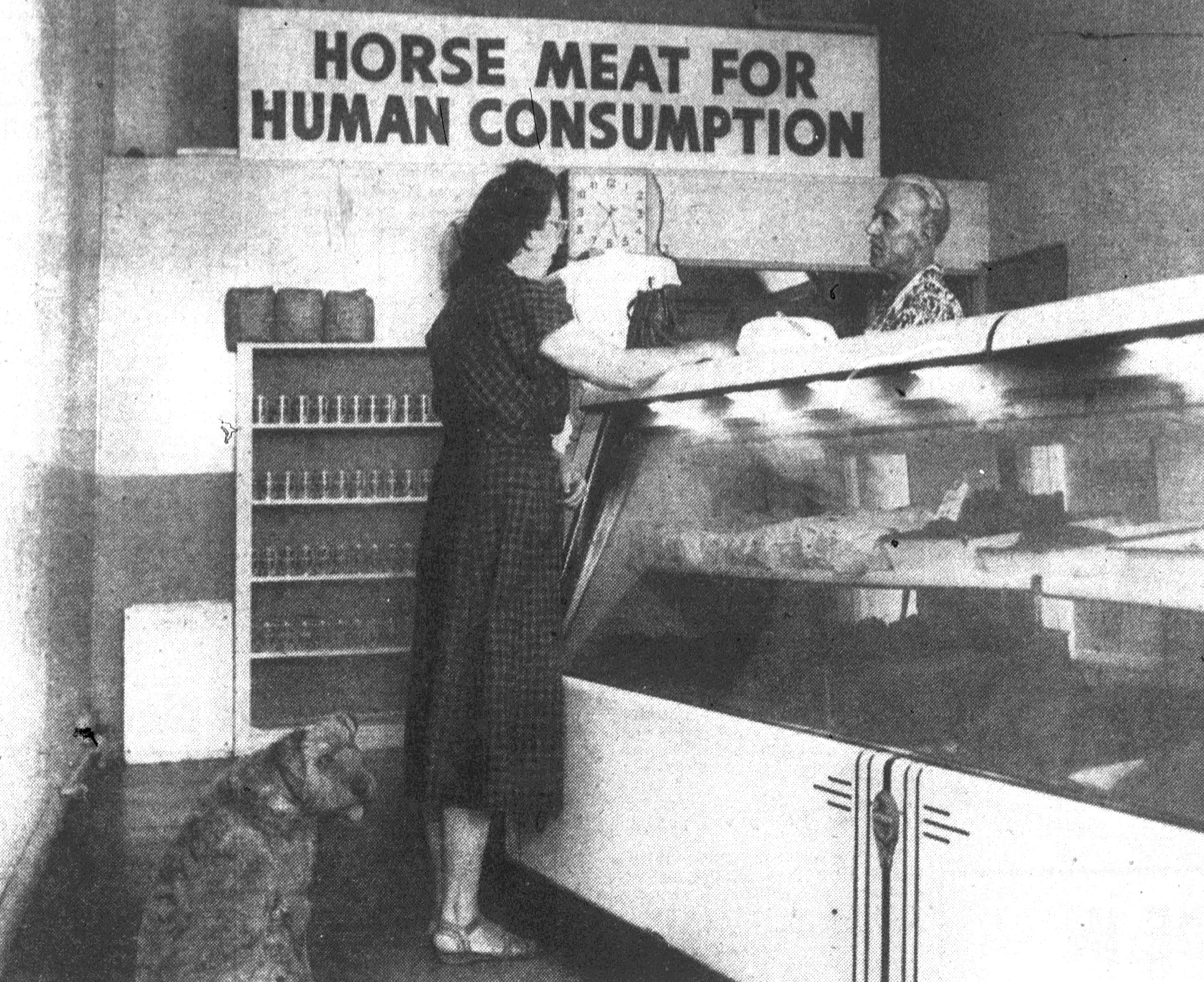
A butcher shop in Los Angeles, California in 1951 with a sign that reads, "Horse meat for human consumption"

Horse meat is generally not eaten in the United States, and is banned in many states in the country. It holds a strong cultural taboo in American culture with 83% of Americans supporting a national ban on horse slaughter.

All horse meat produced in the United States since the 1960s (until operations ceased in 2007) was intended solely for export abroad, primarily to the European Union. However, a thriving horse exportation business is going on in several states, including Texas, primarily exporting horses to slaughterhouses in either Canada or Mexico.

Restriction of human consumption of horse meat in the U.S. has involved legislation at local, state, and federal levels. Several states have enacted legislation either prohibiting the sale of horse meat or banning altogether the slaughter of horses.

California outlawed in 1998 via ballot proposition the possession, transfer, reception, or holding any horse, pony, burro, or mule by a person who is aware that it will be used for human consumption, and making the slaughter of horses or the sale of horse meat for human consumption a misdemeanor offense.

In 2007, the Illinois General Assembly enacted Public Act 95–02, amending Chapter 225, Section 635 of the state's compiled statutes to prohibit both the act of slaughtering equines for human consumption and the trade of any horse meat similarly to Texas Agriculture Code's Chapter 149.

Other states banning horse slaughter or the sale of horse meat include New Jersey, Oklahoma, and Mississippi. In addition, several other states introduced legislation to outlaw the practice over the years, such as Florida, Massachusetts, New Mexico, and New York.

At the federal level, since 2001, several bills have been regularly introduced in both the House and Senate to ban horse slaughter throughout the country without success. However, a budgetary provision banning the use of federal funds to carry out mandatory inspections at horse slaughter plants (necessary to allow interstate sale and exports of horse meat) has also been in place since 2007. This restriction was temporarily removed in 2011 as part of the Consolidated and Further Continuing Appropriations Act for Fiscal Year 2012 but was again included in the FY2014 Agriculture Appropriations Act and subsequent federal budgets, hence preventing the operation of any domestic horse slaughter operation.

Until 2007, only three horse meat slaughterhouses still existed in the United States for export to foreign markets, but they were closed by court orders resulting from the upholding of aforementioned Illinois and Texas statutes banning horse slaughter and the sale of horse meat.

The taboo surrounding horse meat in the United States received national attention again in May 2017 when a restaurant in the Lawrenceville section of Pittsburgh served a dish containing horse tartare as part of a special event the restaurant was hosting with French Canadian chefs as guests. The restaurant, which otherwise does not serve horse meat (which is legal to serve and consume in Pennsylvania), received an inspection and a warning from the USDA not to serve horse meat again. A Change.org petition subsequently went up to advocate making serving horse meat illegal in Pennsylvania.

From the 1920s and through the 1950s or 1960s, with a brief lapse during World War II, horse meat was canned and sold as dog food by many companies under many brands, most notably Ken-L Ration. Horse meat as dog food became so popular that by the 1930s, over 50,000 horses were bred and slaughtered each year to keep up with this specific demand.

=== Europe ===
==== Austria ====
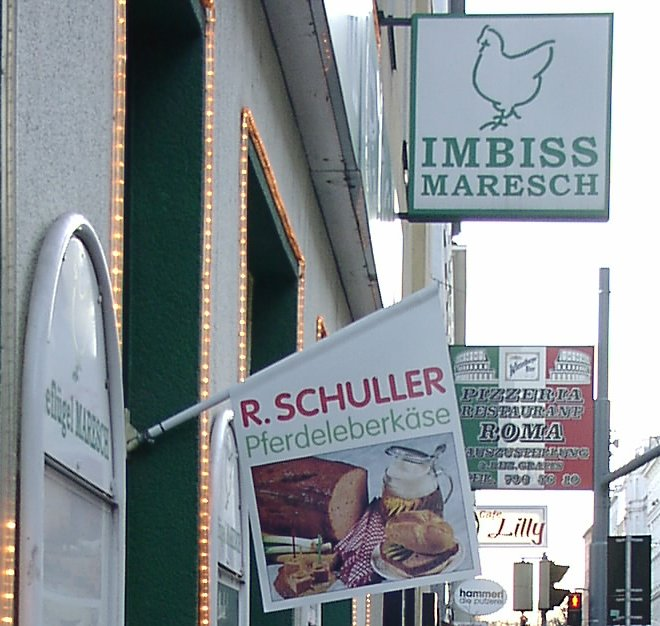
Fast-food shop selling horse Leberkäse (Pferdeleberkäse) in Vienna

Horse Leberkäse is available in special horse butcheries and occasionally at various stands, sold in a bread roll. Dumplings can also be prepared with horse meat, spinach, or Tyrolean Graukäse (a sour milk cheese). Such dumplings are occasionally eaten on their own, in a soup, or as a side dish.

==== Belgium ====
In Belgium, horse meat (paardenvlees in Dutch and viande chevaline in French) is popular in a number of preparations. Lean, smoked, and sliced horse meat fillet (paardenrookvlees or paardengerookt; filet chevalin in French) is served as a cold cut with sandwiches or as part of a cold salad. Horse steaks can be found in most butchers and are used in a variety of preparations. The city of Vilvoorde has a few restaurants specialising in dishes prepared with horse meat. Horse sausage is a well-known local specialty in Lokeren (Lokerse paardenworst) and Dendermonde with European recognition. Smoked or dried horse/pork meat sausage, similar to salami, is sold in a square shape to be distinguished from pork and/or beef sausages. A Flemish region around the Rupel River is also famous for a horse stew named schep, made out of shoulder chuck (or similar cuts), brown ale, onions, and mustard. Schep is typically served with fries, mayonnaise, and a salad of raw Belgian endive.

==== Bulgaria ====
Horse meat is served in some restaurants in Bulgaria, as the preferred way of consuming it is in the form of steaks and burgers. Still being far from a meat for mass consumption, horse meat is regaining its popularity, which it had in the '60s and '70s of the past century, when it was also consumed in sausages and tartare.

==== Finland ====
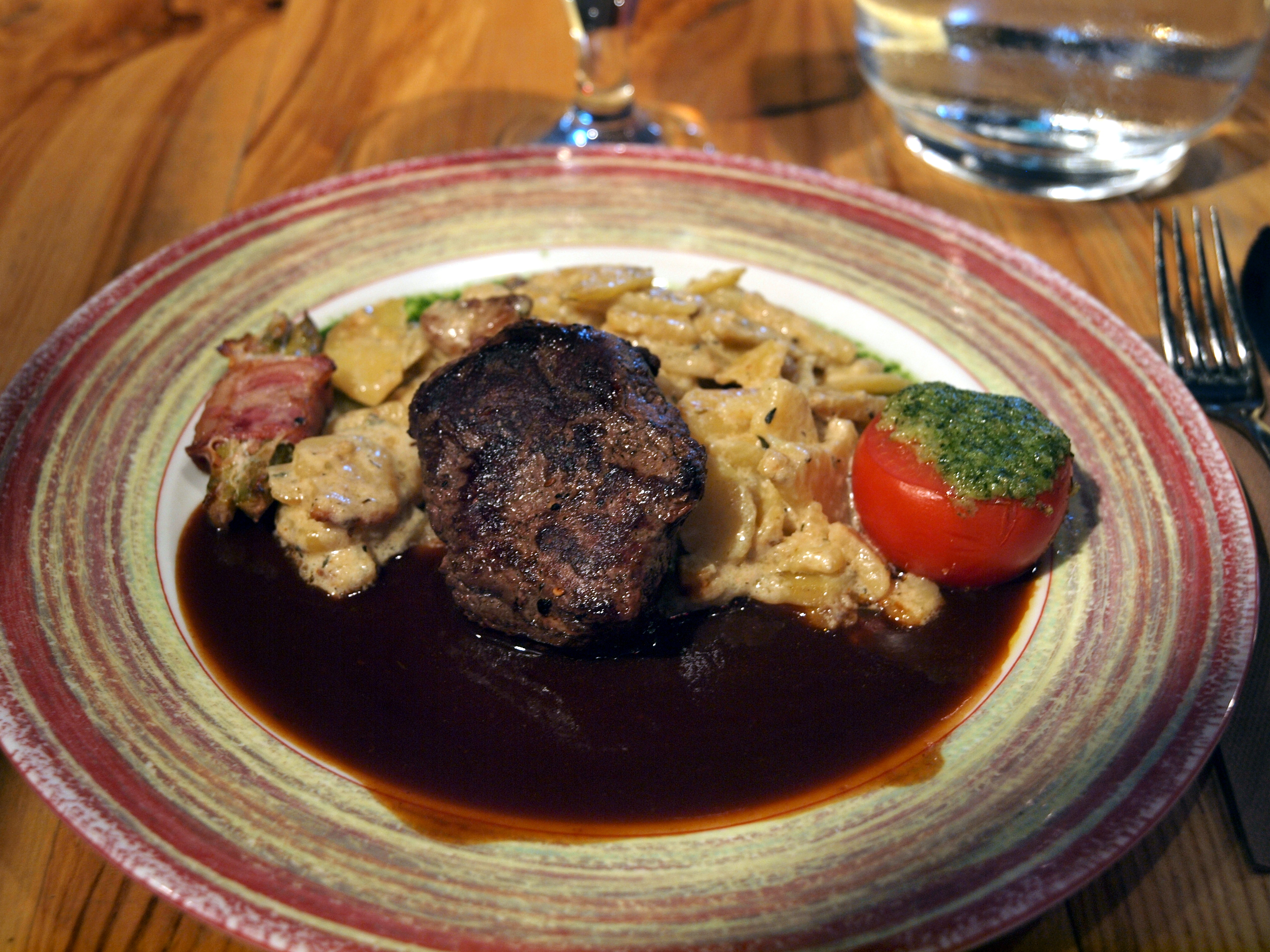
A horse meat steak served at restaurant Oklahoma, Vantaa, Finland

Horse meat is available in butcher shops and shops specializing in meats but it can sometimes be found in supermarkets, especially in ground form. The most common way to eat horse meat is in sausage form, especially meetwursti (Mettwurst), a cured and smoked sausage which often contains pork, beef and horse meat. Finns consume around 400g of horse meat per person per year and the country produces around 300–400 thousand kilograms of meat per year, while importing around 1.5 million kilograms per year from countries like Canada, Mexico or Argentina. No horses are bred for meat production and there are stringent laws against using meat from a horse that has been medicated or injected with antibiotics. Using meat from a horse that has been treated with non-equine medicine or has not been inspected by a veterinarian is banned outright.

==== France ====
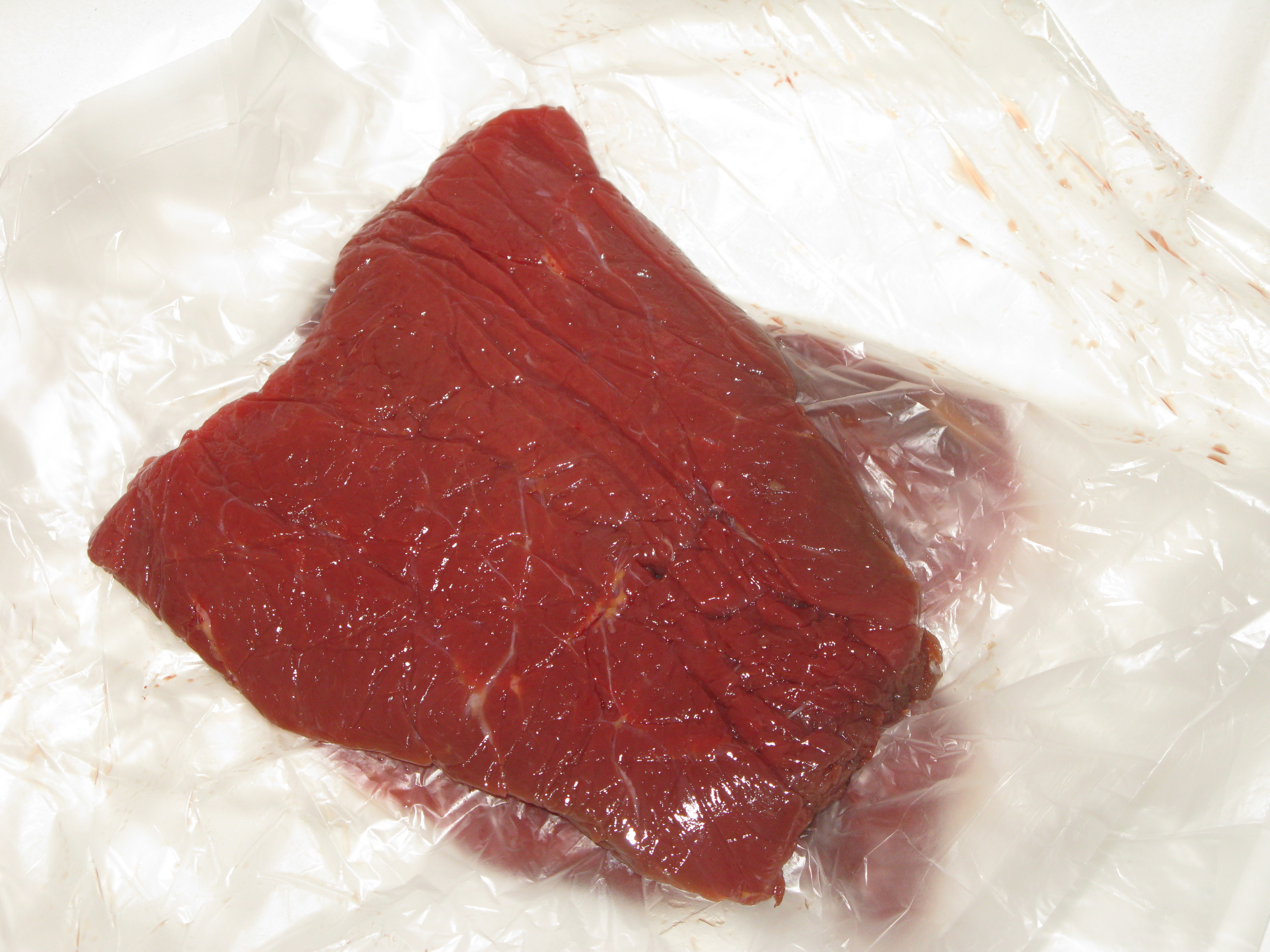
Entrecôte of horse meat, in France

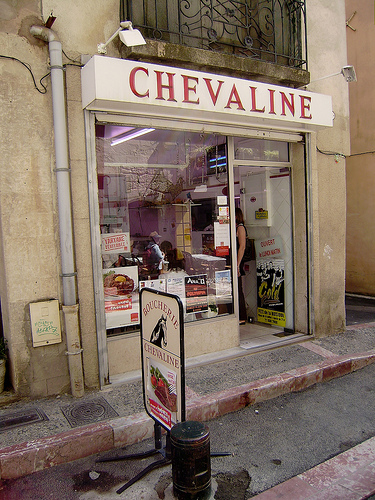
A butcher shop specializing in horse meat in Pezenas, Languedoc, France

In France, specialized butcher shops (boucheries chevalines) sell horse meat, as ordinary butcher shops were for a long time forbidden to deal in it. However, since the 1990s, it can be found in supermarket butcher shops and others. Horse meat was eaten in large amounts during the 1870 Siege of Paris, when it was included in haute cuisine menus.

Horse fat is highly rated for making french fries, though rarely used nowadays. In 2023, the last remaining horse butcher in Paris described the meat as "going out of fashion" as he announced his retirement.

==== Germany ====
Although no taboo comparable to that in the English-speaking world exists, German law used to require that horse meat be sold only by specialized butchers (Pferdemetzgereien). This requirement was retracted in 1993, but only a small minority of ordinary butchers have since begun to sell horse meat. As of 2018, most horse meat was still sold by the specialists, some of whom also delivered by mail order.

Many regions of Germany have traditional recipes that include horse meat. In the Rhineland around Cologne and Düsseldorf, restaurants often offer the traditional Sauerbraten in horse meat, typically with a beef variant to choose from. Other traditional horse meat dishes include the Swabian Pferderostbraten (a joint of roast meat prepared similarly to roast beef), Bavarian sausage varieties such as Rosswurst and Ross-Kochsalami as well as Ross-Leberkäse, a meatloaf dish.

The 2013 meat adulteration scandal started when German authorities detected horse meat in prepared food products including frozen lasagna, where it was declared fraudulently as beef. The mislabeling prompted EU authorities to speed up publication of European Commission recommendations for labeling the origin of all processed meat.

==== Hungary ====
Horse meat has historically been consumed in Hungary. Horse meat consumption continued even after conversion to Christianity in the 11th century (horse meat consumption was condemned by Christianity). Horse meat consumption declined substantially after the Mongol invasion (AD 1241–1242) and disappeared by the mid-sixteenth-century Ottoman occupation.

In Hungary, horse meat is primarily used in salami and sausages, usually mixed with pork, but also in goulashes and other stews. These products are sold in most supermarkets and many butcher shops.

==== Iceland ====
In Iceland, horse meat is both eaten minced and as steak, also used in stews and fondue, prized for its strong flavor. It has a particular role in the culture and history of the island. The people of Iceland supposedly were reluctant to embrace Christianity for some time largely over the issue of giving up horse meat after Pope Gregory III banned horse meat consumption in 732 AD, as it was a major part of many pagan rites and sacrifice in Northern Europe.

Horse meat consumption was banned when the pagan Norse Icelanders eventually adopted Christianity in 1000 AD/Common Era. The ban became so ingrained that most people would not handle horse meat, let alone consume it. Even during harsh famines in the 18th century, most people would not eat horse meat, and those who did were castigated. In 1757, the ban was decriminalised, but general distaste for horse meat lasted well into the 19th century, possibly longer, and its consumption often regarded as an indication of poverty. Horse meat is not very popular (3.2% of Iceland's meat production in 2015), although this has more to do with culinary tradition and the popularity of equestrianism than any religious motivation.

==== Ireland ====
Horse meat is not widely consumed in Ireland. It was DNA sampling efforts of Irish-company IdentiGEN that led to the discovery of horse meat in the European food chain, leading to the 2013 horse meat scandal. However, a 2024 investigation by RTÉ News disclosed that even after improvements made since 2013, meat traceability issues still remain. They uncovered deliberate alteration of horse identities to obscure that certain horses had already been deemed "unfit for human consumption". This was done through changing microchips and horse passports, and in some cases by transporting live horses to other countries where new identities were obtained.

==== Italy ====
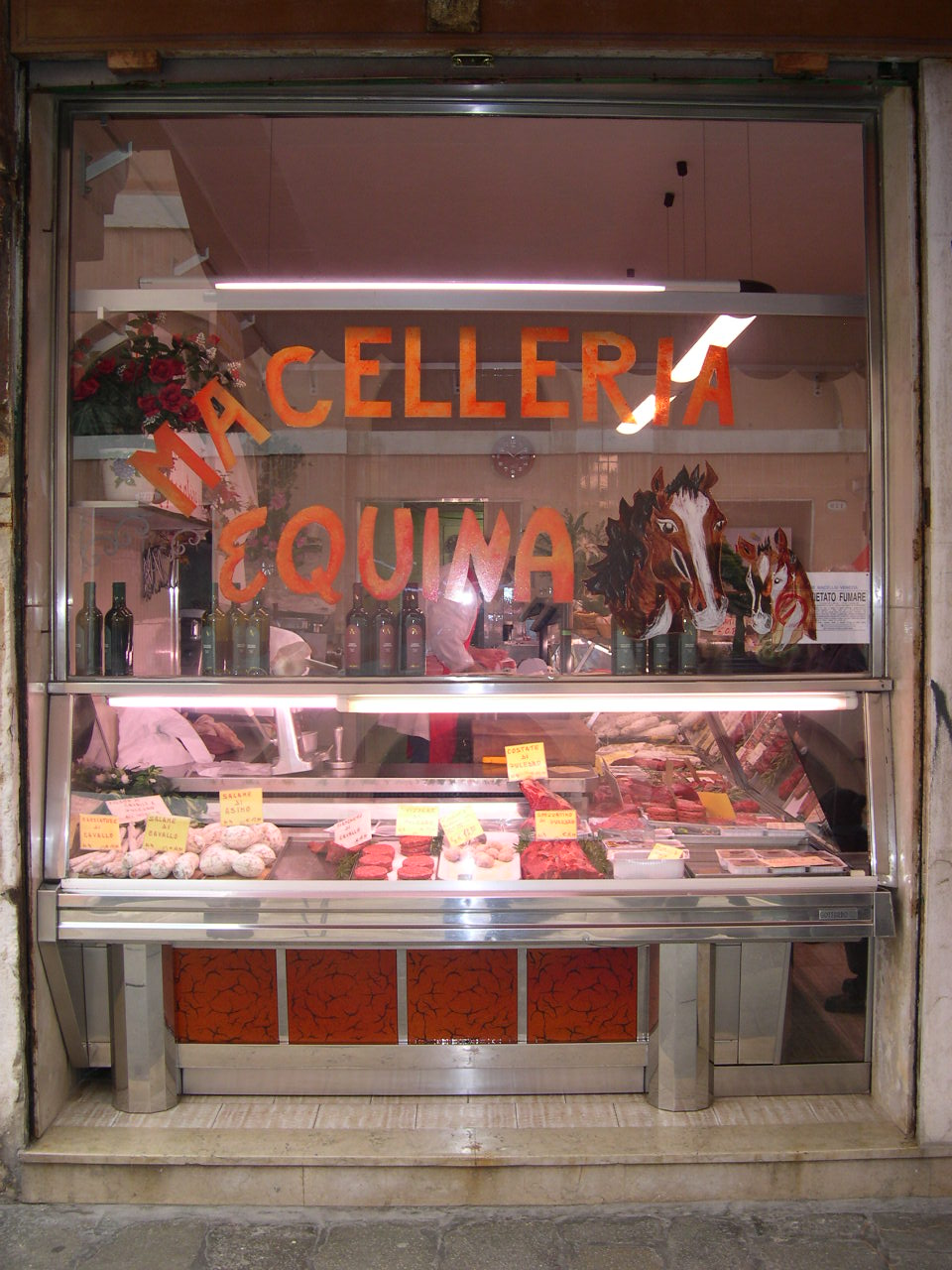
Venetian horse meat butcher

Horse meat is especially popular in Sicily. In Sicily it is part of the traditional historical cuisine of the entire island (especially in the Catania area). Sicily is also the Italian region with the greatest production. In the rest of Italy it remains isolated to some typical dishes.

Horse meat is used in a variety of recipes: as a stew called pastissada (typical of Verona), served as steaks, as carpaccio, or made into bresaola. Thin strips of horse meat called sfilacci are popular. Horse fat is used in recipes such as pezzetti di cavallo. Horse meat sausages and salamis are traditional in various places. In Sardinia, sa petza 'e cuaddu or sa petha (d)e caddu campidanese and logudorese for horse meat) is one of the most renowned meats and sometimes is sold from kiosks with bread – also in the town of Sassari is a long tradition of eating horse steaks (carri di cabaddu in the local dialect). Chefs and consumers tend to prize its uniqueness by serving it as rare as possible. Donkey is also cooked, for example as a stew called stracotto d'asino and as meat for sausages e.g. mortadella d'asino. The cuisine of Parma features a horse meat tartare called pesto di cavallo, as well as various cooked dishes.

In Veneto, the consumption of horse meat dates back to at least 1000 BC to the Adriatic Veneti, renowned for their horse-breeding skills. They were used to sacrifice horses to their goddess Reitia or to the mythical hero Diomedes. Throughout the classical period, Veneto established itself as a centre for horse breeding in Italy; Venetian horses were provided for the cavalry and carriage of the Roman legions, with the white Venetic horses becoming famous among Greeks and Romans as one of the best breeds for circus racing. As well as breeding horses for military and farming applications, the Venetics also used them for consumption throughout the Roman period, a practice that established the consumption of horse meat as a tradition in Venetian cuisine. In the modern age, horse meat is considered a luxury item and is widely available through supermarkets and butcheries, with some specialised butcheries offering only selected cuts of equine meat. Prices are usually higher than beef, pork, or any other kind of meat, except game.

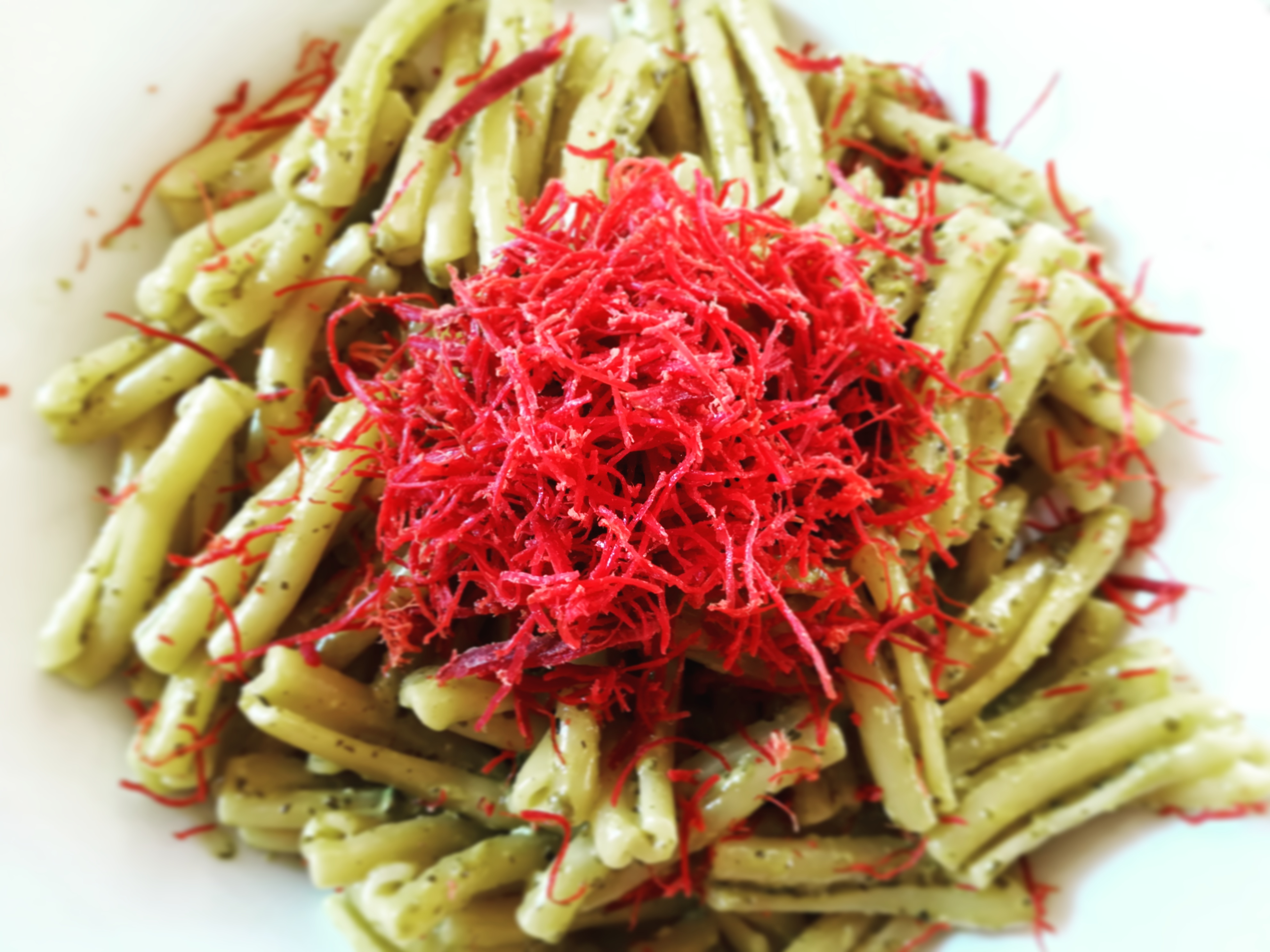
Typical Paduan specialty: horse sfilacci, smoked and salt-cured "frayed threads" of meat

In the province of Padua, horse meat is a key element of the local cuisine, particularly in the area that extends southeast from the city, historically called Saccisica. Specialties based on horse meat constitute the main courses and best attractions of several typical restaurants in the zone. They are also served among other regional delicacies at the food stands of many local festivals, related to civil and religious anniversaries. Most notable is the Festa del Cavallo, held annually in the small town of Legnaro and totally dedicated to horses, included their consumption for food.

Some traditional dishes are:

- Sfilacci di cavallo: tiny frayings of horse meat, dried and seasoned; to be consumed raw, can be a light and quick snack, more popular as a topping on other dishes: ex. pasta, risotto, pizza, salads, etc.
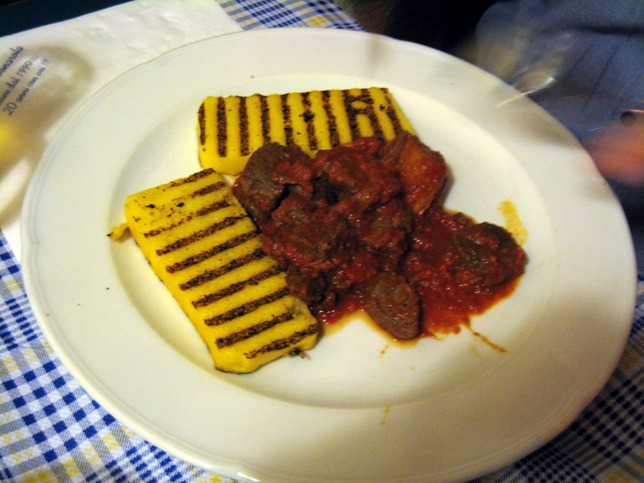
  Cavało in Úmido (traditional horse meat stew from Padua) with grilled polenta
- Straéca: a thin soft horse steak, cut from the diaphragm, variously cooked and dressed on the grill, pan or hot-plate
- Bistecca di puledro: colt steak, whose preparation is similar to straéca
- Spezzatino di cavallo: also said cavało in úmido, small chunks of horse meat, stewed with onion, parsley and/or other herbs and flavours, potatoes, broth, wine, etc., usually consumed with polenta, much appreciated also is a similar stew made of donkey meat, served in traditional trattorie, with many variations for different villages: spessadín de musso, musso in úmido, musso in tocio, musso in pocio
- Prosciutto di cavallo: horse ham, served in very thin slices
- Salame di cavallo or salsiccia di cavallo: various kinds of salami, variously produced or seasoned, sometimes made of pure equine meat, sometimes mixed with others (beef or pork)
- Bigoli al sugo di cavallo: a typical form of fresh pasta, similar to thick rough spaghetti, dressed with sauce like Bolognese sauce, but made with minced horse meat
- Pezzetti di cavallo al sugo: horse stew, seasoned with sauce, vegetables and various peperoncino, widely used in the Salento
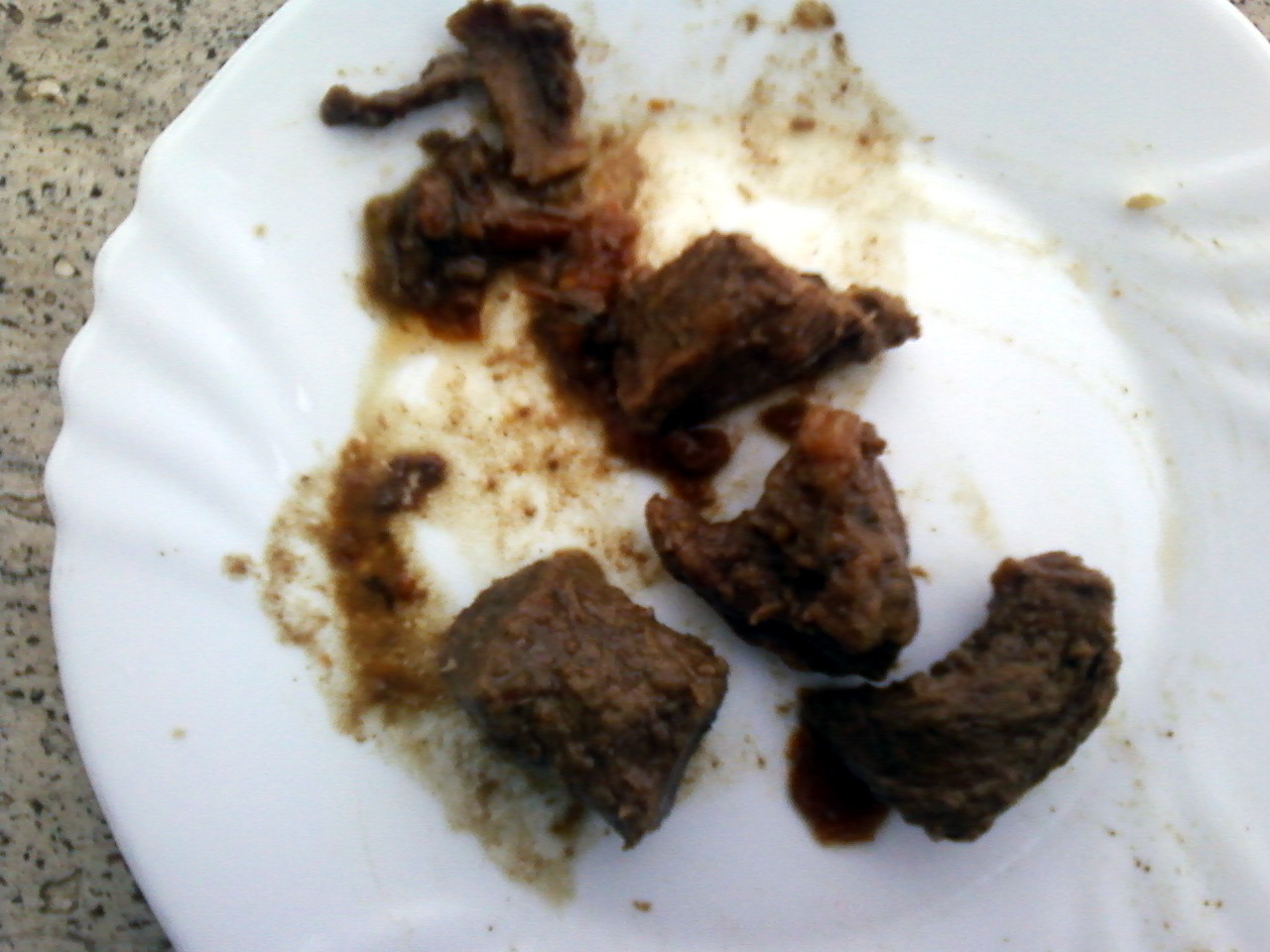
  Chunks (pezzetti) of horse stew (spezzatino di cavallo)

In southern Italy, horse meat is commonly eaten everywhere – especially in the region of Apulia, where it is considered a delicacy. It is a vital part of the ragù barese ([raˈɡu bbaˈreːze]) in Bari and of the pezzetti di cavallo, a stew with tomato sauce, vegetables and chili, popular in Salento.

According to British food writer Matthew Fort, "The taste for donkey and horse goes back to the days when these animals were part of everyday agricultural life. In the frugal, unsentimental manner of agricultural communities, all the animals were looked on as a source of protein. Waste was not an option."

==== Malta ====
In Malta, horse meat (Maltese: laħam taż-żiemel) is seared and slowly cooked for hours in either tomato or red wine sauce. A few horse meat shops still exist and it is still served in some restaurants.

==== Netherlands ====
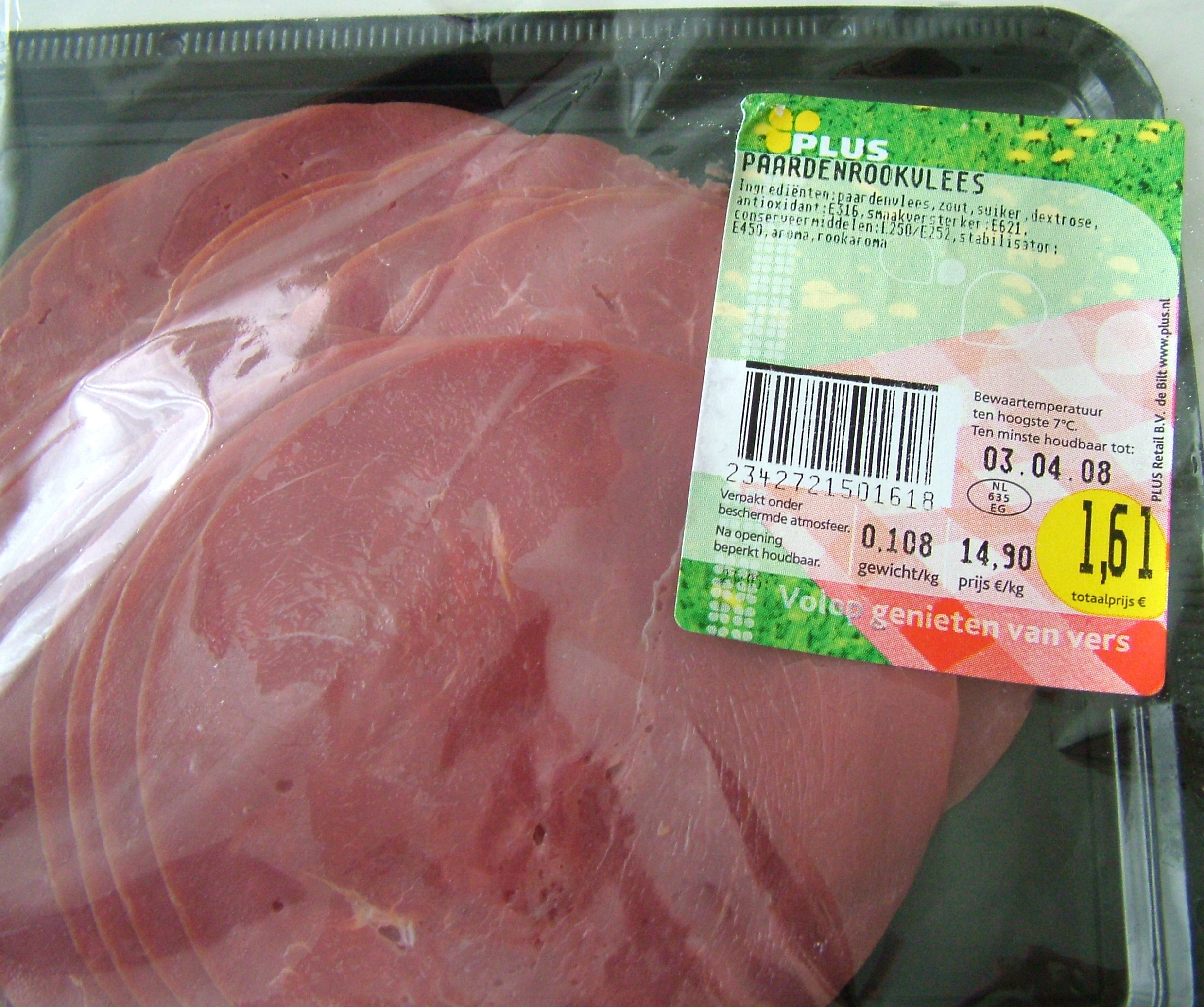
Sliced and packaged horse meat from the Netherlands

In the Netherlands, smoked horse meat (paardenrookvlees) is sold as sliced meat and eaten on bread. Zuurvlees, a southern Dutch stew, is made with horse meat as main ingredient. There are also beef-based variants. Horse meat is also used in sausages (paardenworst and frikandel), fried fast food snacks and ready-to-eat soups.

==== Norway ====
In Norway, horse meat is commonly used in cured meats, such as vossakorv and svartpølse, and less commonly as steak, hestebiff.

In pre-Christian Norway, horse was seen as an expensive animal. To eat a horse was to show one had great wealth, and to sacrifice a horse to the gods was seen as the greatest gift one could give. When Norwegians adopted Christianity, horse-eating became taboo as it was a religious act for pagans, thus it was considered a sign of heresy. These days, consumption of horse meat is considered controversial, but not uncommon.

==== Poland ====
Older horses are often exported while still alive to Italy to be slaughtered. This practice is considered controversial. Horses in Poland are treated mostly as companions, and the majority of Poles are against live export for slaughter. Poland has a tradition of eating horse meat (e.g., sausage or steak tartare.) The consumption of horse meat was highest at times when other meat was scarce, such as during the Second World War and the communist period that followed it.

==== Serbia ====
Horse meat is generally available in Serbia, though mostly shunned in traditional cuisine. It is, however, often recommended by general practitioners to persons who suffer from anemia. It is available to buy at three green markets in Belgrade, a market in Niš, and in several cities in ethnically mixed Vojvodina, where Hungarian and previously German traditions brought the usage.

==== Slovenia ====
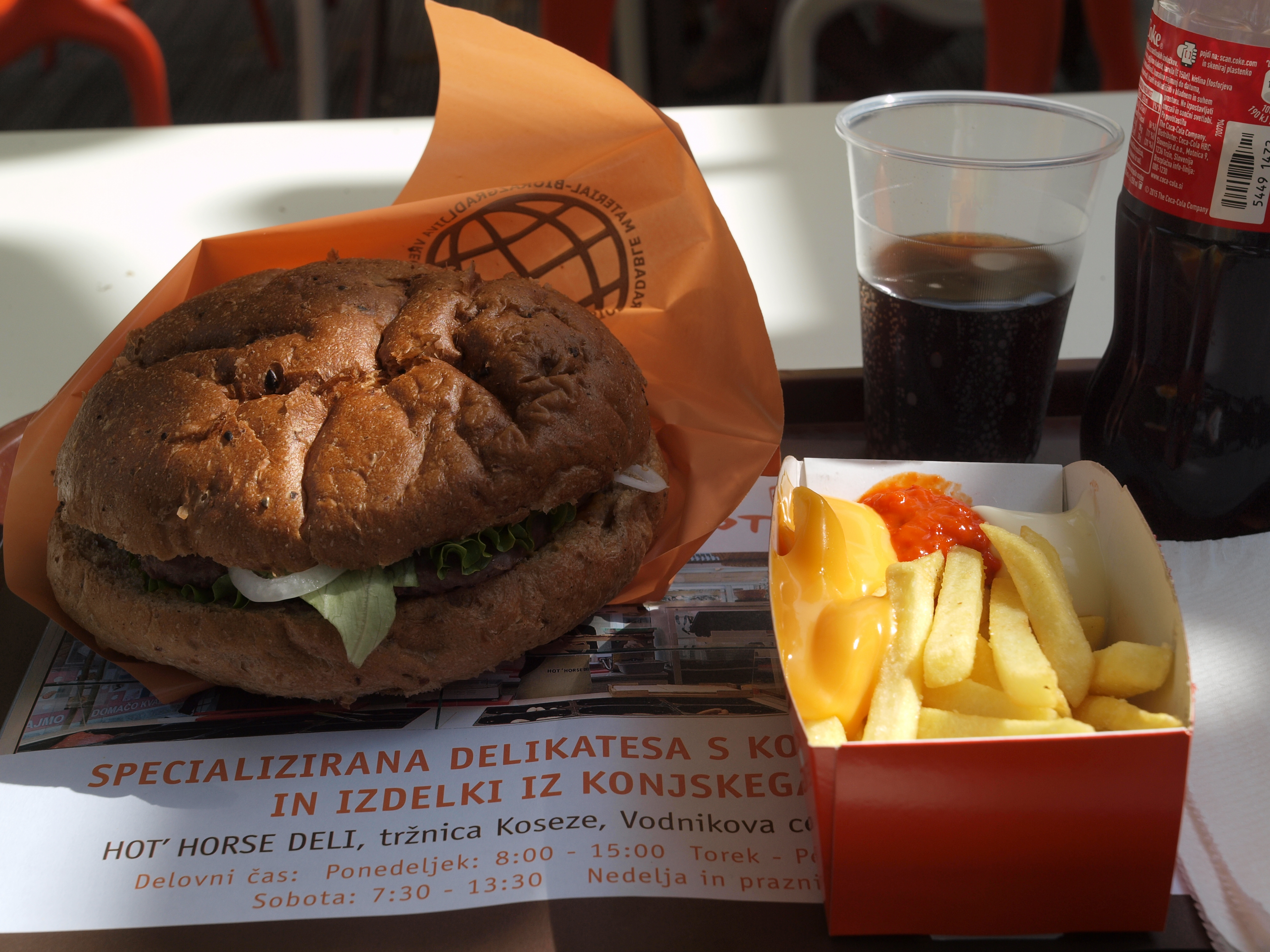
A horse meat hamburger in restaurant Hot' Horse, Ljubljana, Slovenia: Horse meat is a national delicacy in Slovenia.

Horse meat is generally available in Slovenia, and is highly popular in the traditional cuisine, especially in the central region of Carniola and in the Karst region. The horse breed known as Slovenian Cold-blood is raised for meat as well as for pulling. Colt steak (žrebičkov zrezek) is also highly popular, especially in Slovenia's capital Ljubljana, where it is part of the city's traditional regional cuisine. In Ljubljana, many restaurants sell burgers and meat that contain large amounts of horse meat, including a fast-food chain called Hot' Horse.

==== Spain ====
Cecina is a cured meat made from beef or horse, and is considered a delicacy. Foal meat (carne de potro) is preferred over horse meat for this purpose. Horse meat is easily found in supermarkets, and usually prepared as a stew or as steak. A common practice is to serve horse meat to anemic children. Although no generalized taboo exists in Spain, consumption of horse meat is minor, compared to that of pork, beef, or lamb.

On 1 December 2022, an operation by Europol and the Spanish Civil Guard announced the arrest of 41 individuals involved in a criminal enterprise illegally selling untraceable horse meat to the Spanish, Belgian and German markets. The criminal enterprise acquired horses from across Spain, generating illegal profits of EUR 1.5 million.

==== Sweden ====
Smoked, cured horse meat is widely available as a cold cut under the name hamburgerkött (literally hamburger meat). It tends to be very thinly sliced and fairly salty, slightly reminiscent of deli-style ham, and as a packaged meat, may list horse meat (as hästkött) as its primary ingredient. Several varieties of smoked sausage made from horse meat, including Gustafskorv, are also quite popular, especially in the province of Dalarna, where they are produced. Gustafskorv, similar to salami or metworst, may substitute for those meats in sandwiches.

==== Switzerland ====
Horse meat is widely available and consumed in Switzerland, where no taboo exists regarding it. The laws on foodstuffs of animal origin in Switzerland explicitly list equines as an animal type allowed for the production of food. Horse steak is widely offered in restaurants. A marinated, smoked deli meat specialty known as mostbröckli is made here with beef or horse meat. Horse meat is also used for a range of sausages in the German-speaking north of Switzerland. As in northern Italy, in Switzerland's Italian-speaking south, local salametti (sausages) may be made with horse meat. Horse may also be used in fondue Bourguignonne.

==== United Kingdom ====
In the United Kingdom, the slaughter, preparation, and consumption of horses for food is not against the law, although it has been rare since the 1930s, and horse meat is not generally available. A cultural taboo against consuming horse meat exists in the UK, although it was eaten when other meats were scarce, such as during times of war, as was whale meat, which similarly failed to achieve popularity. The sale of meat labelled as horse meat in UK supermarkets and butchers is minimal, and most actual horse meat consumed in the UK is imported from continental Europe, predominantly from the south of France, where it is more widely eaten.

Horse meat was featured in a segment of a 2007 episode of the Gordon Ramsay series The F Word. In the segment, Janet Street-Porter convinced locals to try horse meat, though not before facing controversy and being forced to move her stand to a privately owned location. The meat was presented as having a similar taste to beef, but with less fat, a high concentration of omega-3 fatty acids, and as a safer alternative in times of worry regarding bird flu and mad cow disease. The segment was met with skepticism from many viewers after broadcast for various reasons, either because some felt the practice was cruel and against social norms, or simply a belief that if the taste was really on par with other meats, then people would already be eating it. A company called Cowley's Fine Foods has also launched a horse jerky range called My Brittle Pony.

Horse meat may be eaten without the knowledge of the consumer, due to accidental or fraudulent introduction of horse meat into human food. A 2003 Food Standards Agency investigation revealed that certain sausages, salami, and similar products such as chorizo and pastrami sometimes contained horse meat without it being listed, although listing is legally required. The 2013 horse meat scandal involved multiple products being recalled from shelves due to unlabelled horse meat in amounts up to 100% of the meat content.

=== Asia-Pacific ===
==== Australia ====
Australians do not generally eat horse meat, although they have a horse slaughter industry that exports to EU countries. In the Australian meat substitution scandal of 1981, it was revealed that both horse and kangaroo meat has been intentionally mislabeled as beef for export. Horse meat exports peaked at 9,327 tons in 1986, declining to 3,000 tons in 2003. They are at Peterborough in South Australia (SAMEX Peterborough Pty Ltd) and Caboolture Abattoir in Queensland (Meramist Pty Ltd). A British agriculture industry website reported that Australian horse meat production levels had risen to 24,000 tons by 2009.

On 30 June 2010, Western Australian Agriculture Minister Terry Redman granted final approval to Western Australian butcher Vince Garreffa to sell horse meat for human consumption. Vince Garreffa is the owner of Mondo Di Carne, a major wholesale meat supplier, which supplies many cafes, restaurants, and hotels in Western Australia. He commented that no domestic market exists for horse meat (all while a successful export market exists).

==== China ====
Outside of specific areas in China, such as Guilin in Guangxi or in Yunnan Province, horse meat is not popular due to its low availability and the belief that horse meat has a bad taste or that it is bad for health. The Compendium of Materia Medica written during the Ming dynasty by Li Shizhen says that horse meat is poisonous and may cause folliculitis or death. The compendium also asserts, "to relieve toxins caused by eating horse meat, one can drink Phragmites root juice and eat apricot kernel." In southern China, local dishes include horse meat rice noodles (马肉米粉; Pinyin: mǎròu mǐfěn) in Guilin and horse meat hot pot (马肉火锅; Pinyin: mǎròu huǒguō) in Huishui County in Guizhou Province.

==== Indonesia ====
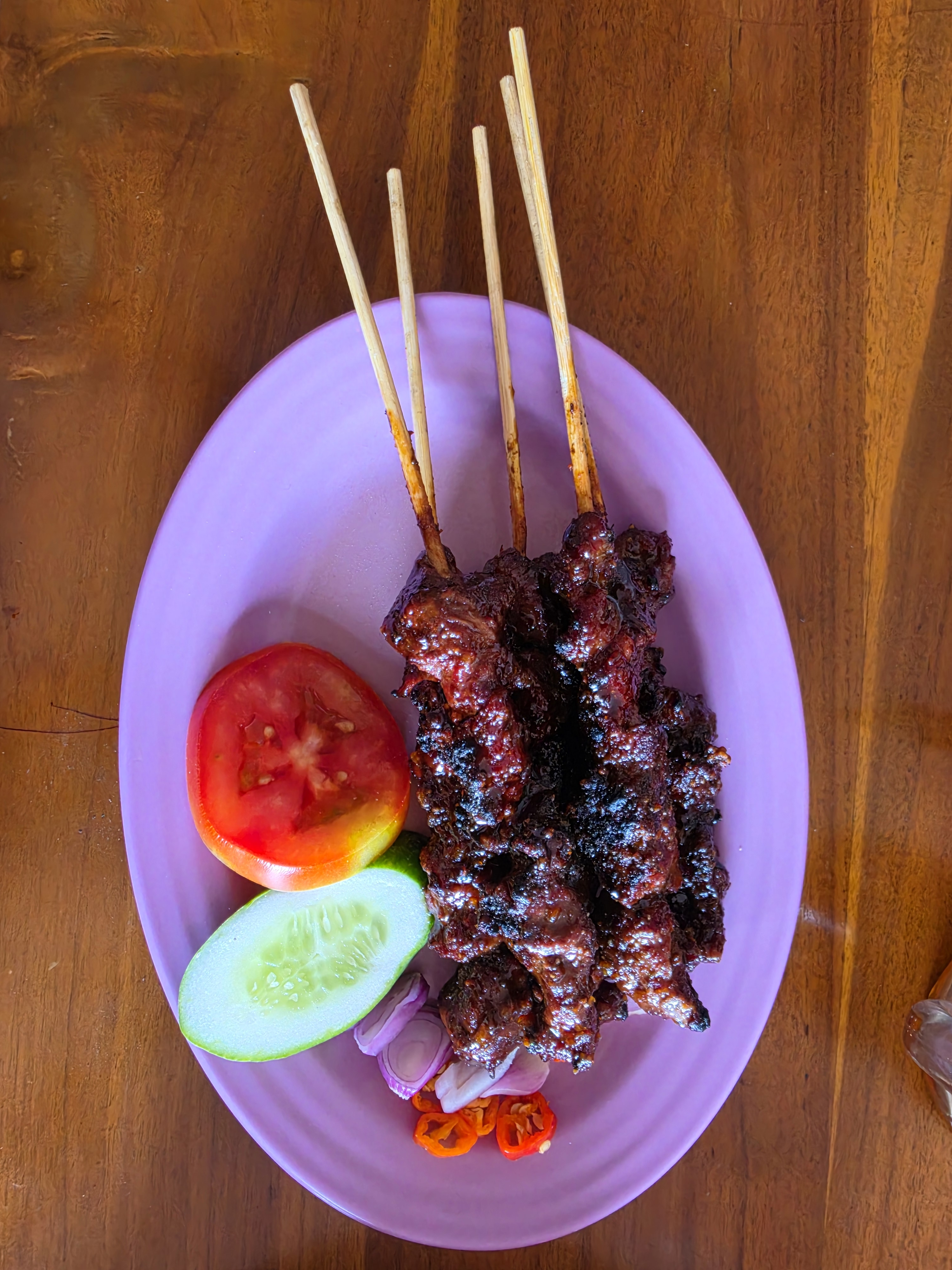
A plate of horse satay, 2026

In Indonesia, horse meat is made into satay (Javanese: sate jaran, Indonesian: sate kuda). This Yogyakartan dish is served with sliced fresh shallot, pepper, and sweet soy sauce. Horse meat is believed to be a source of strength and eating it is thought to increase a man's vitality.

==== Japan ====
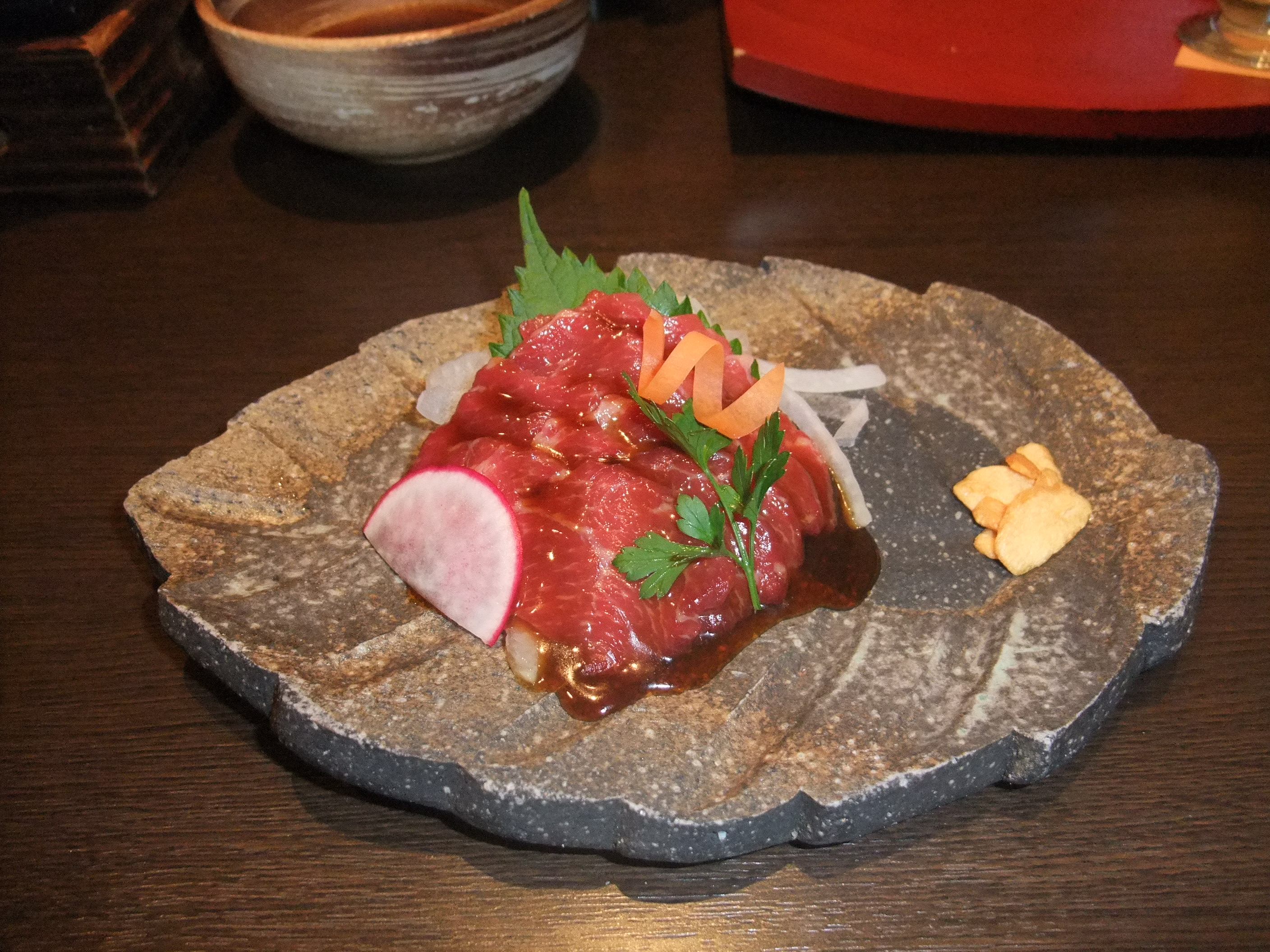
Basashi from Kumamoto

In Japanese cuisine, raw horse meat is called sakura (桜) or sakuraniku (桜肉, sakura means "cherry blossom", niku means "meat") because of its pink color. It can be served raw as sashimi in thin slices dipped in soy sauce, often with ginger, onions, garlic, and/or shiso leaves added. In this case, it is called basashi (馬刺し). Basashi is popular in some regions of Japan and is often served at izakaya bars. Fat, typically from the neck, is also found as basashi, though it is white, not pink. Horse meat is also sometimes found on menus for yakiniku (a type of barbecue), where it is called baniku (馬肉; lit. 'horse meat') or bagushi (馬串; "skewered horse"); thin slices of raw horse meat are sometimes served wrapped in a shiso leaf. Kumamoto, Nagano, and Ōita are famous for basashi, and it is common in the Tōhoku region, as well. Some types of canned corned meat in Japan include horse as one of the ingredients.

Aside from raising local draft horses for meat, Japan imports living horses (from Canada and France) and meat from several countries — the five largest horse meat exporters to Japan are Canada, Mexico, Italy, Argentina, and Brazil.

==== Kazakhstan and Kyrgyzstan ====
Horse meat stall at Green Bazar, Almaty

In Kazakhstan and Kyrgyzstan, horse meat is a large part of the diet, due mainly to the nomadic roots of the population.

Some of the dishes include:

- sausages called qazı (kazy) and chuchuk or shuzhyk made from the meat using the guts as the sausage skin,
- zhaya made from hip meat, which is smoked and boiled,
- jal (or zhal) made from neck fat which is smoked and boiled,
- karta made from a section of the rectum that is smoked and boiled,
- and sur-et which is kept as dried meat.

Sür et (сүр ет) is salted horsemeat that smoked over elm, juniper or meadowsweet.

==== Mongolia ====
Mongolian cuisine includes salted horse meat sausages called kazy that are produced as a regional delicacy by the Kazakhs. Generally, Mongols prefer beef and mutton (though during the extremely cold Mongolian winter, some people prefer horse meat due to its low cholesterol). It is kept unfrozen, and traditionally people believe horse meat helps warm them up.

Other Asian nations import processed horse meat from Mongolia.

==== Philippines ====
In the Philippines, horse meat (lukba, tapang kabayo, or kabayo) is a delicacy not commonly sold in wet markets. It is prepared by marinating the meat in lemon juice, soy sauce or fish sauce, then fried and served with vinegar for dipping.

==== South Korea ====
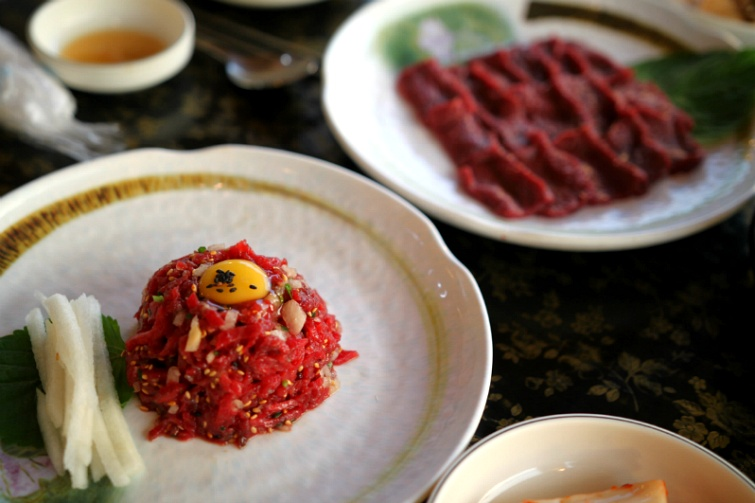
Korean Malgogi-yukhoe (horse meat tartare)

In South Korea, horse meat is generally not eaten, but raw horse meat, mostly taken from the neck, is consumed as a delicacy on Jeju Island.

==== Tonga ====
In Tonga, horse meat is eaten nationwide. The dish is also popular among the Tongan diaspora. Methodist missionary George Daniel wrote notably about a breeding pair left by James Cook during his second Oceanic voyage in Angaha close to Fuaʻamotu which were slaughtered not long after.

== See also ==
- Meat horse – Horses bred specifically for horse meat
- Horses in Slovenia § Hippophagy
- Equine ethics § On slaughtering and hippophagy
- Mare milk
- Donkey meat
- List of meat animals
- Whale meat
- Dog meat
- Monkey meat
- 2013 horse meat scandal
