= Trade Control and Expert System =

The Trade Control and Export System (TRACES), is a web-based veterinarian certification tool used by the European Union for controlling the import and export of live animals and animal products within and without its borders. Its network falls under the responsibility of the European Commission. TRACES constitutes a key element of how the European Union facilitates trade and improves health protection for the consumer, as laid down in the First Pillar principle. Other countries use computer networks to provide veterinary certification, but TRACES is the only supranational network working at a continental scale of 28 countries and almost 500 million people.

== Background ==
Since the end of the nineteenth century, following the development of modern veterinary medicine and food safety, European states have built, in parallel with customs structures, veterinary inspection stations located at the borders known as Border Inspection Posts. There all goods of animal origin including live animals are checked in order to avoid outbreaks of zoonoses and epizooties.

At the establishment of the European Economic Community (EEC) in 1958, each country used its own national legislation to set standards for the health of internationally traded animals and their products.

In the 1990s, according to its first pillar, the European Union began studying how to provide a European-scale computer network dedicated to food safety and animal health with the aim of strengthening the single European market and the protection of consumers.

The TRACES network started up in April 2004 as a replacement for the older ANIMO and SHIFT networks.

== Features ==
The first mention of TRACES was in the decision of the Commission 2003/623/CE of 19 August 2003.

It is based on a network using internet veterinary authorities of member states and participating non-EU countries. Through it, central and local authorities, border inspection posts and economics operators are linked.

It provides electronic sanitary certificates mandatory for tracking goods and live animals: Common Veterinary Entry Document (CVED) as defined in decision 2003/279/CE of the Commission of 15 April 2003 for products (CVED P) and in regulation 2004/282/CE of the Commission of 18 February 2004 for CVED for live animals (CVED A).

TRACES sends an electronic message from the departure point to the transfer point and the arrival point to notify that a consignment is arriving. Similarly, every concerned point sends a message to other points which enables a well-developed follow up of the consignment (goods or animals) movement.

It provides the ad-hoc European Union legislation, manages the non-EU country establishment list which is the agreed-upon list for importing into the EU, and keeps on file the rejected consignments and the reason for rejection.

Economic operators are able to start the process electronically by filling in the first part of the mandatory certificates for importing goods and animals into the EU.

Its next step will be electronic certification without any paperwork. At the moment, the legal basis for exchange of goods or live animals among non-EU countries and the EU is a paper certificate, even if the decision 2004/292/CE says it mandatory for member states and economic operators to use TRACES since 31 December 2004.

TRACES uses all the official languages of the EU, plus Russian. The Directorate-General for Health and Food Safety, Directorate G, unit G5, sector TRACES, is in charge of the workload.

== History ==
Before TRACES, the EU tried twice to create a computer-based network dedicated to food safety and animal health for exchange of goods and live animals via the ANIMO and SHIFT networks.

=== ANIMO ===
ANIMO (Animal Movement System), a computer-based tracking system for animal movements, was set up in 1990. Its creation was triggered by directive 90/425/CEE.

On 15 July 1991, the directive of the Council 91/496/CEE defined the veterinary checks to be carried out on imported goods from non-EU countries.

The 19 July 1991 decision of the Commission 91/398/CEE is in relation to a computer-based network linking veterinary authorities (ANIMO).

The Commission launched an invitation to tender in December 1991. On 3 December 1991, the decision of the Commission 91/638/CEE concerned itself with the designation of the host centre.

On 2 July 1992, Commission 92/373/CEE stated that ANIMO was to be hosted in Belgium.

On 25 September of that year, Commission 92/486/CEE stated that the common host would work with member states.

On 21 December 1992, the Commission 93/70/CEE specified the message ANIMO will send using its own coding system which is different from the ISO code used by the World Customs Organisation and now in use in TRACES.

Finally on 4 June 2002, Commission 2002/459/CE defined the list of ANIMO units and repealed Decision 287/2000/CE.

ANIMO was used by member states, Switzerland, Norway, Iceland, Andorra, San Marin, Slovenia, Malta and Cyprus. ANIMO was only able to send messages and lacked interactivity with veterinary authorities. ANIMO was able to trace the origin of animals and goods in the event of problems and to warn veterinary authorities if the relevant data had been added to system, but this was not done systematically. The system lacked a database on European legislation about importation from non-EU countries. This resulted in a loss of time at border inspection posts, as one had to wait for the proper legislation to be found. ANIMO was also devoted only to live animals. It did not track data concerning rejected animals or goods; a rejected consignment could attempt entry point at another border post. Additionally, ANIMO did not track the movement of animals or goods within the EU. Therefore, the Commission developed another tool, the SHIFT network.

=== SHIFT ===
SHIFT, the system to assist with the health controls of import of items of veterinary concern at frontier inspection posts from third countries, was first developed after the publication of decision 88/192/CEE of the Council on 28 March 1988. Article 1 stated, "The Commission shall be responsible for drawing up a programme for the development of computerization of veterinary importation procedures (Shift project)."

Decision 92/438/CEE of the Council specified the computerisation of veterinary import procedures (SHIFT project), amended Directives 90/675/EEC, 91/496/EEC, 91/628/EEC and Decision 90/424/EEC, and repealed Decision 88/192/EEC. This decision again gave the Commission the responsibility of organising a computer network.

SHIFT was designed to electronically manage the sanitary aspects of animal and animal products coming from non-EU countries. It was divided into three parts:

- The Community Import Requirement Database (CIRD), was dispatched to veterinary officials in border inspection posts the legislation necessary for imports. It was also supposed to control the valid data of consignments. The impossibility of updating this database in real time was the main reason for its failure.
- The Rejected Consignments System (RCS), a database which tracked information regarding rejected animals and animal products to prevent them from attempting to enter the EU through the border at a different location. This worked as a prototype in Greece and Belgium.
- The List Management System (LMS) recorded details of establishments in non-EU countries which had been approved to import into the EU by the veterinary authority of their country.

=== The failure of ANIMO and SHIFT ===
SHIFT has never operated except partially in Belgium and Greece. Both ANIMO and SHIFT failed to provide a useful tool to strengthen food safety and secure animal health in Europe. Members states were probably not ready to delegate responsibility in such sensitive matter as food safety and public health. AMINO and SHIFT predated common use of the internet, and staff at border inspection posts may not have been aware or concerned about being part of a national and European safety network. The Commission itself was only mildly enthusiastic.

=== The establishment of TRACES ===
After ANIMO and SHIFT proved to be particularly ineffective during the outbreak of swine fever at the end of the 1990s, the European Parliament in Resolution A5-0396/2000 of 13 December 2000:

Asks the Commission to ensure that the Animal Movement System (ANIMO) is managed and developed under the full control of the Commission

Regrets that three years after consideration of an assessment of the ANIMO system, improvements have yet to be introduced; asks the Commission to table without delay proposals for the modification of Council Directive 90/425/EEC taking into consideration the Court of Auditors’ observations and the above-mentioned assessment, as undertaken by the Commission itself

Again, in 2002, following the 2001 foot-and-mouth disease outbreak in the UK, European Parliament stated:

The Commission should without delay take measures to improve the existing system for monitoring the movement of live animals within the EU (Animo system). In addition, the system for the monitoring of imports into the EU (Shift system) should be introduced quickly.

The decision of the Commission 24/2003/EC of 30 December 2002 foresaw the elaboration of the new computer system and the 19 August 2003 decision 2003/623/CE announced the development of an integrated computerized veterinary system known as TRACES:

In connection with the establishment provided for in Decision 2003/24/EC, of the single architecture known as TRACES, combining the functions of the ANIMO and SHIFT systems, the Commission shall develop the new ANIMO system and make it available to the Member States.

Parameters of the new network included:

- An Internet-based architecture between member states' veterinary structures (especially border inspection posts), members states' central veterinary authorities, the European Commission and the central authorities and local inspection posts of non-EU countries;
- An access to EU legislation;
- Tracking of rejected goods or live animals;
- Management of non-EU countries lists of approved establishments to import into the EU.

TRACES was developed with inside competencies, not with an external host centre. It is under the responsibility of the Directorate-General for Health and Consumer Protection or DG-SANCO.

All European member states were required to use TRACES as of 1 January 2005.

== Working flow ==
TRACES functions in all of the official languages of the EU except Irish, as well as in Chinese, Croatian, Icelandic, Norwegian, Russian and Turkish.

=== Providing certificates ===
TRACES provides electronic, with the possibility to print, veterinary and sanitary certificates which are mandatory with consignments during import and movement in the EU. These certificates follow both live animals and animal products as they travel to and through the EU.

- Certificates of intra-community trade, Regulation 599/2004 of the Commission;
- Certificates for importing into the EU from a non-EU country, Decision 2007/240/CE of the Commission;
- Common Veterinary Entry Document for animals, Regulation 282/2004/CE of the Commission and for products, Regulation 136/2004/CE of the Commission.

=== Notification ===
Notification is just an extemporaneous exchange of information as defined in Directive of the Council 90/425/CEE, laid down in Articles 4 and 8 and 10 and 20.

The Commission shall introduce, in accordance with the procedure laid down in Article 18, a computerized system linking veterinary authorities, with a view, in particular, to facilitating the exchange of information between the competent authorities of regions where a health certificate or document accompanying the animals and products of animal origin has been issued and the competent authorities of the Member State of destination.

At each step of transport, at the border inspection post for example, TRACES provides an electronic message to whoever is concerned by this movement. If a main problem of public health or animal health is identified during an inspection, this notification is twinned by a notification in the RASFF alert network.

=== Management of non-EU countries' establishments lists ===
Non-EU establishments must be approved by the veterinary authorities of their country before being listed by the Commission. This procedure allows them the right to import to the EU. When filling in the certificate the economic operator has only to call up his own establishment in the list and tick the box. Regulation 854/2004 of the European Parliament.

=== Serious threats ===
TRACES provides EU legislation covering the required field for each certificate, imposes the physical checks applicable and the reinforced checks. In case of serious threat or disease outbreak the Commission can activate via TRACES the necessary safeguard measures through a 20 May 1994 decision of the Commission 94/360/CE which deals with reinforced checks and safeguard measures.

=== Traceability ===
Traceability is the core element of TRACES. It tracks every importation or movement in the EU of animals or animal products. In case of any problems, movements can be tracked instantaneously. Data about rejected consignments and the reasons of rejection, are also kept.
