= Scientific Committee on Emerging and Newly Identified Health Risks =

EU scientific committee

The Scientific Committee on Emerging and Newly Identified Health Risks (SCENIHR) was one of the independent scientific committees managed by the Directorate-General for Health and Consumer Protection of the European Commission, which provide scientific advice to the Commission on issues related to consumer products. In 2016, it was merged into a new committee, the Scientific Committee on Health, Environmental and Emerging Risks.

== Activities ==
The SCENIHR provided scientific opinions on questions concerning emerging or newly identified risks on non-food products, as well as on broad, complex or multidisciplinary issues requiring a comprehensive assessment of risks to consumer safety or public health not covered by other risk assessment bodies.

Examples of areas of activity include new technologies (such as nanotechnologies), medical devices, antimicrobial resistance, physical risks (such as noise and electromagnetic fields), and methodologies of risk assessment.

== Procedures ==
SCENIHR's scientific advisory procedures were based on the principles of scientific excellence, independence and transparency.

== See also ==
The Directorate-General for Health and Consumer Protection also manages two other independent Scientific Committees on non-food products:

- The Scientific Committee on Consumer Safety (SCCS)
- The Scientific Committee on Health and Environmental Risks (SCHER)

For questions concerning the safety of food products, the European Commission consults the European Food Safety Authority (EFSA).
