= European Health Examination Survey =

- "Measuring the Health of Europeans"
- Type of project: Medical data gathering
- Location: Europe
- Key people: Pilot survey participants: Czech Republic: National Institute of Public Health; Finland: National Institute for Health and Welfare; Germany: Robert Koch Institute; Greece: Hellenic Health Foundation; Italy: Istituto Superiore di Sanità; Malta: Department of Health Information & Research; Netherlands: National Institute of Public Health and the Environment; Norway: Norwegian Institute of Public Health; Poland: The Cardinal Stefan Wyszynski Institute of Cardiology; Portugal: Instituto Nacional de Saúde Dr. Ricardo Jorge; Slovakia: Regional Authority of Public Health; UK: University College London
- Funding: DG Santé
- Website: www.ehes.info

The European Health Examination Survey (EHES) is an ongoing series of large-scale clinical epidemiological studies. It is a cooperative effort among multiple European nations, in concert with the European Union (EU), the European Economic Area (EEA) and the European Free Trade Area (EFTA). While actual data collection is carried out through the health ministries of each participating nation, the coordination of these efforts across borders is under the jurisdiction of the European Commission's Directorate-General for Health and Food Safety.

== Overview ==
A health examination survey consists of the collection of both interview data (in the form of a self-guided questionnaire, an interview with a medical professional, or both) and physical examination data such as blood testing and weight measurement.

The EHES is officially a project of the European Commission's Directorate-General Santé et Consommateurs (Directorate-General for Health and Consumers, DG SANCO). It is a goal of the EHES project to include HES participation from all EU, EEA and EFTA countries.

The importance of medical examination data that can be correlated across populations, and EHES's contributions in that regard, have been noted by a number of healthcare researchers and policymakers.

EHES data have furthermore been used as the basis for more specific studies, such as examination of issues in participation rates in healthcare surveys and identification of groups with risk factors for metabolic syndrome.

== History ==
National-level Health Examination Surveys (HES) had been carried out by multiple European countries beginning in the late 1950s, with increased interest in conducting HESs by national governments beginning around the year 2000, but there was no standardisation of parameters between countries prior to 2009. With nearly 20 European countries planning to conduct their own HESs within a five-year window, it was decided that standardization of survey protocols was a priority.

=== FEHES ===
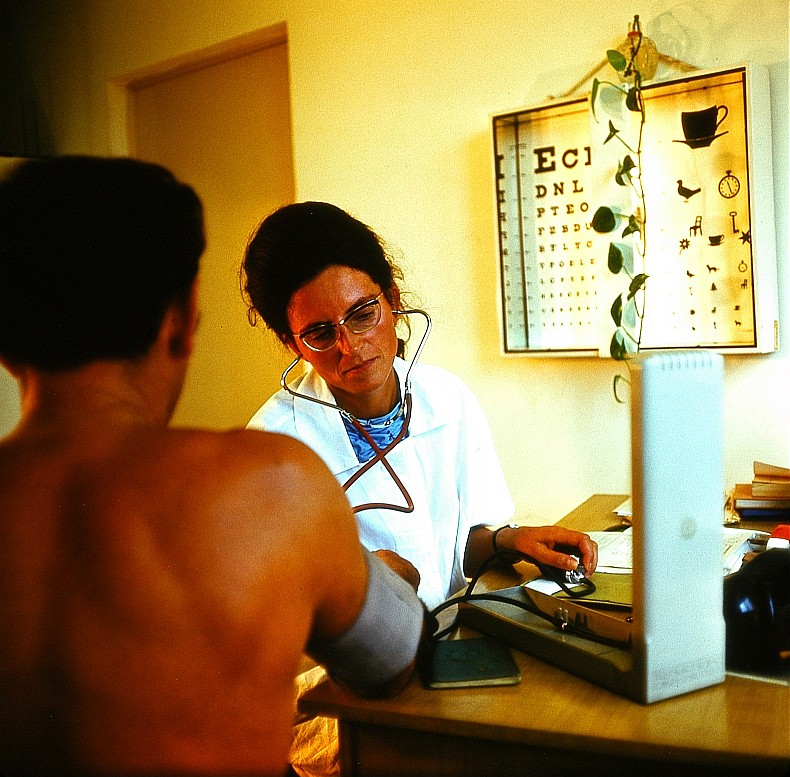
Blood pressure readings are an essential component of the EHES

From 2006–2008, the feasibility of creating a single standardized HES for all European Union (EU) member nations and all members of the European Free Trade Association/European Economic Area (EFTA/EEA) was evaluated by the Feasibility of the European Health Examination Survey (FEHES) Project. This project concluded that such a standardized HES was indeed feasible, and proposed a two-phase approach to the EHES project. Phase one would involve establishing centralized coordination for the project, conducting pilot surveys for an initial 8–12 nations, and designing and preparing full-scale surveys for those initial HESs. Phase two would involve carrying out the full-scale surveys in the initial 8–12 nations, and coordinating the design and preparation of full-scale surveys in the other European countries.

FEHES also made recommendations regarding data management; documentation and reporting; establishing and maintaining international collaboration; ethical and legal issues; measurements to be included in the pilot HESs; models for the organization of national HES infrastructure; recruitment or study participants; sampling issues; and standardization of measurement protocols.

The countries expected to be part of an eventual Europe-wide Health Examination Survey as of 2008 were Austria, Belgium, Bulgaria, Croatia, Cyprus, the Czech Republic, Denmark, Estonia, France, Germany, Greece, Hungary, Iceland, Ireland, Italy, Latvia, Lithuania, Luxembourg, the former Yugoslavian Republic of Macedonia, Malta, the Netherlands, Norway, Poland, Portugal, Romania, Slovakia, Slovenia, Spain, Sweden, Turkey, and the United Kingdom.

=== The EHES pilot program ===
The pilot project for the European HES, funded by the European Commission, was carried out from 2009–2012. Coordination for the pilot project was administered by the EHES Pilot Reference Centre (EHES RC), a collaboration between Finland's National Institute for Health and Welfare (THL), Italy's Istituto Superiore di Sanità (ISS), and Norway's Statistics Norway (SSB).

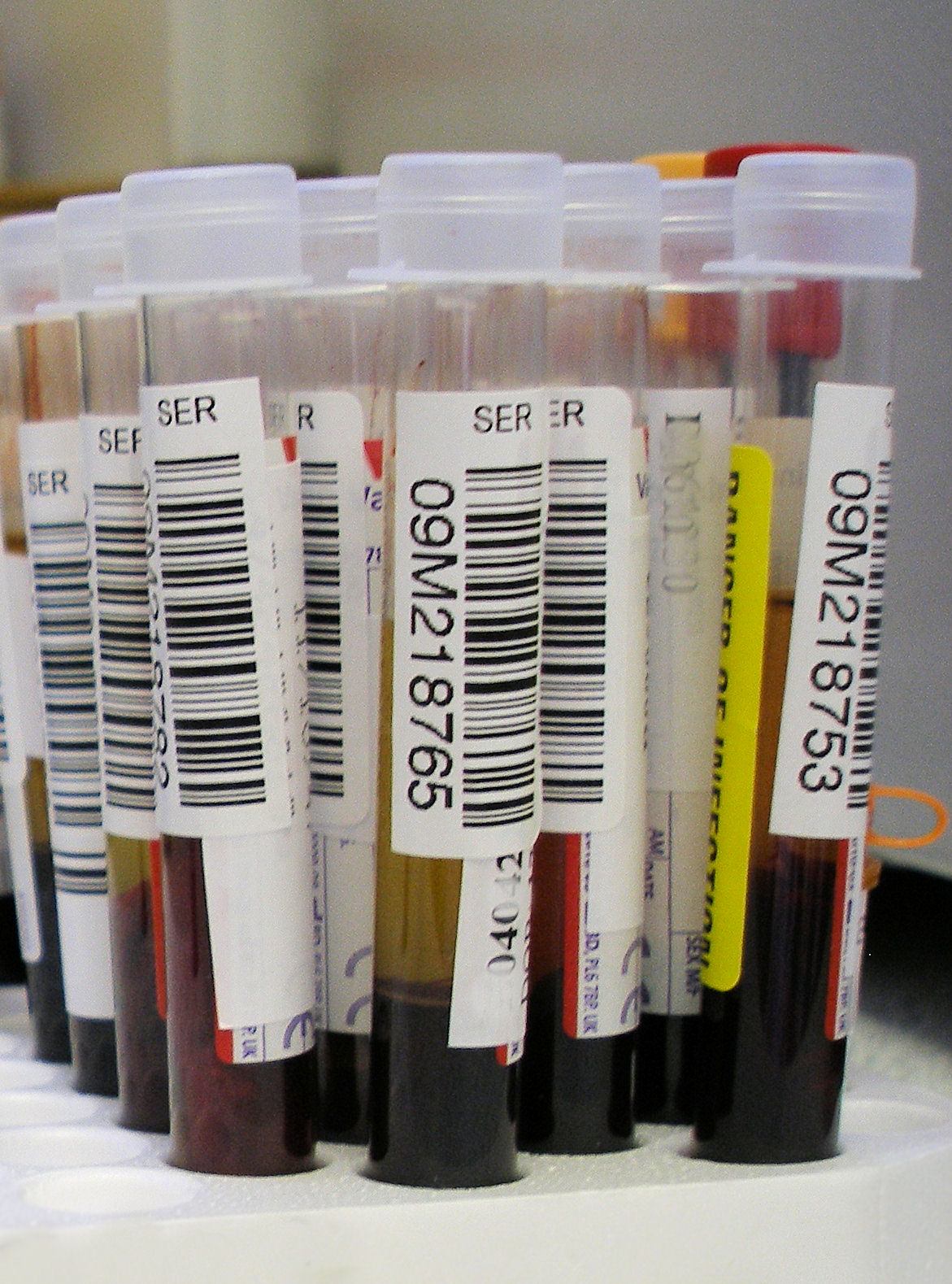
Blood tests are another essential component of the European Health Examination Survey, used to measure cholesterol and glucose levels

EHES RC created a centralised system for data management and reporting of survey data, designed and produced training seminars for participating countries, provided logistical support to countries participating in the pilot studies, published standardized HES protocols in an EHES Manual, and supervised both internal and external quality control for the EHES. The EHES Manual defined protocols for health measurements, described organization of the fieldwork, discussed ethical issues, established definitions of data-reporting indicators, included information on sampling, and provided "other details relating to the planning and conducting of a national HES." The final version of the EHES Manual incorporated revisions based on discoveries made during the pilot program.

Pilot project preliminary surveys were carried out in 12 countries: the Czech Republic, Finland, Germany, Greece, Italy, Malta, the Netherlands, Norway, Poland, Portugal, Slovakia, and the UK. (In Germany, Italy, the Netherlands and the UK, HESs were already under way when the pilot program began, thus the primary focus of the pilot program in those countries was evaluating the feasibility of converting the existing programs to match the EHES standards.) Initially, Hungary and Spain were going to be included in the pilot project as well, but logistical problems prevented their participation. The countries included were chosen based on their either already having begun a national HES, or being in the early planning stages for such a survey. These pilot studies established standardised protocols for the measurement of key risk factors for chronic disease, such as blood lipids, blood glucose, blood pressure, height, waist circumference and weight. Standardised questions for the questionnaire portion of the EHES were also developed, covering such topics as current health status, smoking history, socio-economic status, and use of health care services; as much as possible, questions conformed to the European Health Interview Survey.

Plans for training of personnel were developed, as were plans for external quality assessment. The minimum sample size in each pilot project country was 200 individuals between 25 and 64 years of age. The pilot survey project succeeded at standardizing HES measurements across populations despite participant countries having differing cultural settings, economic statuses, infrastructures and levels of previous experience conducting an HES.

== Participation by country ==
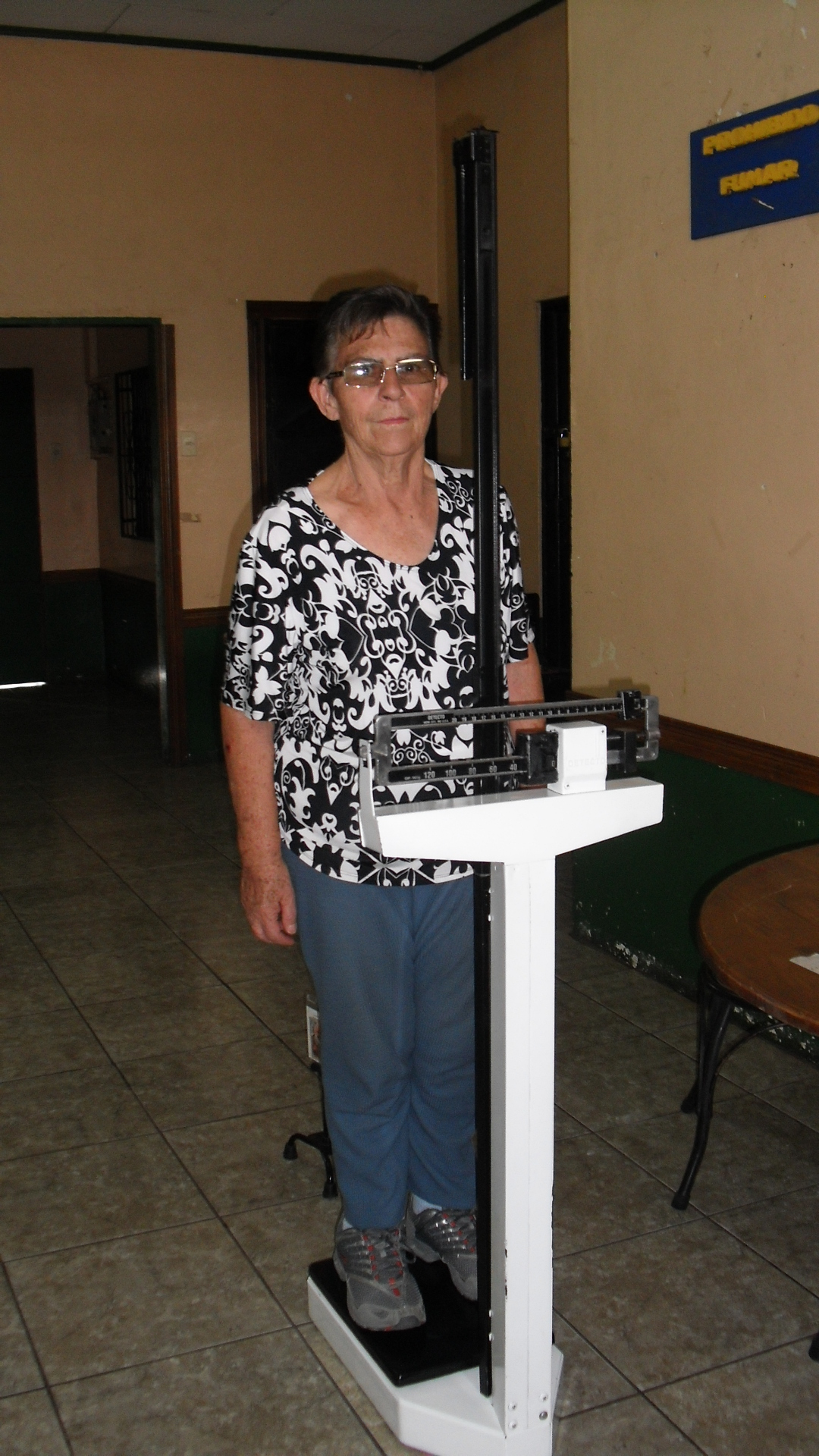
Accurate measurements of height and weight are another essential component of the EHES

21st-century European HESs by country and year
Country	Prior HESs	FEHES Pilot	EHES	Future plans
Austria	none	—		
Belgium	none	—		
Bulgaria	none	—		
Croatia	2003	—		
Cyprus	2000	—		
Czech Republic	2004–2005	2010–2011	2014–2015	2019
Denmark	2007–2008	—		
Estonia	none	—		
Finland	2000, 2002, 2007	2011–2012		2017
France	2006–2007	—	2014–2016	
Germany	2003	2008–2011	2014–2016	2018–2020
Greece	none	2011	2012, 2013–2014	2015–2017
Hungary	none	[dropped out]		
Iceland	none	—		
Ireland	2002, 2007	—		
Italy	1998–2002	2008–2012		
Country	Prior HESs	FEHES Pilot	EHES	Future plans
Latvia	none	—		2016
Lithuania	none	—		
Luxembourg	none	—	2012, 2013–2015	
Malta	none	2010	2013–2014	2015–2016
Netherlands	1999–2001	2009–2010		
Norway	none	2011, 2012	2013	
Poland	2003–2005; 2006–2008	2011	2013–2014	
Portugal	none	2010	2012–2014, 2015–2016	2020
Slovakia	2003	2011–2012		2016
Slovenia	none	—		
Spain	2007	[dropped out]		
Sweden	none	—		
Turkey	2008	—	2015–2017	
UK (England)	2000 (Note: Health Examination Surveys were carried out annually beginning with this year, and will continue until at least 2019, when the desirability of continuing to conduct annual surveys will be re-assessed.)	2008–2011	2012–present	annually to 2019
UK (Scotland)	2003	2008–2011	2012–present	annually to 2019
Country	Prior HESs	FEHES Pilot	EHES	Future plans
