= Rapid Alert System for Food and Feed =

- Formation: 2002
- Founded at: European Union
- Purpose: System for reporting food safety issues
- Website: https://food.ec.europa.eu/food-safety/rasff_en

The Rapid Alert System for Food and Feed (RASFF) is a system for reporting food safety issues within the European Union. It was established in 1979 as the Rapid Alert System for Food. In 2002, feed was incorporated and covered by the system under Regulation (EC) 178/2002 of 28 January 2002, which entered into force on 21 February 2002. Its objective is to achieve "a high level of protection of human life and health", based on the principle that the free movement of food and feed within the European Community (now the European Union) can only be achieved if food and feed safety requirements do not differ significantly between Member States.

== See also ==
- European Food Safety Authority
- Food and Agriculture Organization
- Food safety
- EUROPHYT
- TRACES
