= Lokerse paardenworst =

Belgian sausage dish from Lokeren

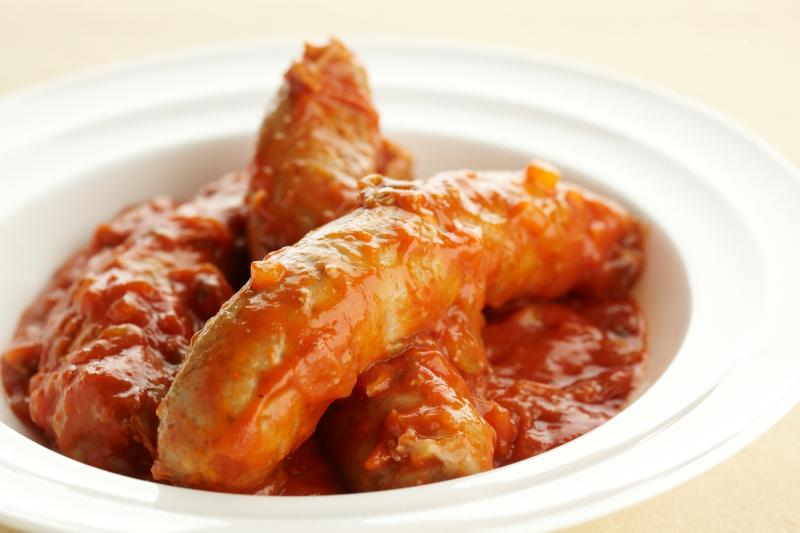
Lokerse horse sausages in tomato sauce

The Lokerse paardenworst (Lokeren horse sausage) is a regional product from the Belgian city of Lokeren. The dish consists of minced horse sausage in a sauce of tomato purée or peeled tomatoes, onions and celery, herbs (bay leaf, pepper and salt), butter or oil.

The Lokerse horse sausage was recognized in 2007 as a Flemish regional product by the Flemish Center for Agro- and Fisheries Marketing (VLAM). At present, the aim is to obtain European recognition as a regional product.

== History ==
More than a hundred years ago, horse sausage was a nutritious meal in lean times. Horse meat could be afforded by anyone, as it came from worn-out horses from farms, the Antwerp harbor and coal mines, and was mixed with imported meat from the United States. Around the end of the 19th century Lokeren experienced a lot of unemployment and poverty. The horse sausage was therefore the ideal solution for the poorest population, because the product was both cheap and nutritious. There were also a lot of horse slaughterers active in the Waasland. The tougher meat was processed into horse sausage, which became very dry, so that the idea arose to add a tomato sauce.

== Trivia ==
An album from the Urbanus comic strip was titled Lokerse paardenworsten in 2009.

== Sources ==
- Streekproduct.be: Lokerse paardenworsten
- Het Nieuwsblad, 28 September 2007, Erkende Lokerse paardenworst wil Europees
- Waasland Tourism
- Slagerij Van Moeseke
