= Common Veterinary Entry Document =

Example of a blank CVED

The Common Veterinary Entry Document (CVED) was the official document used in all member states of the European Union (EU) to pre-notify the arrival of consignments of live animals (excluding pets), animal products, and products of animal origin intended for import into or transit through the EU from third countries. Introduced in 2004, the CVED was replaced by the Common Health Entry Document (CHED) on 14 December 2019 under Regulation (EU) 2017/625.

== Background ==
The European Union developed the CVED system to strengthen veterinary controls on imports from non-EU countries following the establishment of the single market. The regulatory framework was established by Council Directive 91/496/EEC for live animals and Council Directive 97/78/EC for products of animal origin. The CVED served as the primary interface between importers and veterinary authorities, providing a standardized format for notification and recording of inspection outcomes across all EU member states.

== Types ==
Two principal variants of the CVED existed:

- CVED-A (CVED for Animals): Used for live animals entering the EU, introduced by Commission Regulation (EC) No 282/2004 of 18 February 2004.
- CVED-P (CVED for Products): Used for products of animal origin, introduced by Commission Regulation (EC) No 136/2004 of 22 January 2004.

== Structure ==
The CVED consisted of three parts:

- Part I contained details about the consignment including the consignor, consignee, country of origin, means of transport, veterinary documents, and description of the animals or products. This section was completed by the person responsible for the load (the importer or their agent) and submitted to the Border Inspection Post (BIP) at least one working day before the expected arrival of the consignment.
- Part II recorded the results of the veterinary checks conducted at the BIP and was completed by the official veterinarian. This section documented the competent authority's decision regarding acceptance, rejection, or channeling of the consignment.
- Part III was used for follow-up purposes, including confirmation of arrival at destination, recording of non-arrival, or noting quantitative or qualitative mismatches between the documentation and actual consignment.

== Veterinary checks ==
Three categories of veterinary checks were performed at Border Inspection Posts:

- Documentary checks: Examination of the veterinary certificates, health attestations, and other accompanying documentation to verify compliance with EU import requirements.
- Identity checks: Verification that the animals or products physically present corresponded to those described in the accompanying documentation.
- Physical checks: Inspection of the animals or products themselves, which could include examination of animal welfare conditions, sampling for laboratory analysis, and temperature monitoring for products.

== Submission ==
A CVED could be submitted on paper or electronically through the TRACES (TRAde Control and Expert System), the EU's web-based veterinary certification system managed by the European Commission's Directorate-General for Health and Food Safety. TRACES was launched in April 2004, replacing the earlier ANIMO and SHIFT computer systems. From 1 January 2005, all EU member states were required to use TRACES for veterinary notifications.

Electronic CVEDs required electronic signatures from both the operator responsible for the load and the official veterinarian, along with electronic seals from the issuing competent authority and the TRACES system itself.

== Replacement by CHED ==
On 14 December 2019, the CVED was superseded by the Common Health Entry Document (CHED) under the Official Controls Regulation (Regulation (EU) 2017/625). The transition also involved the replacement of Border Inspection Posts (BIPs) with Border Control Posts (BCPs) and the migration from TRACES Classic to a new version known as TRACES NT.

The CHED system introduced four document variants to cover a broader range of goods:

- CHED-A: For live animals
- CHED-P: For products of animal origin
- CHED-PP: For plants and plant products
- CHED-D: For feed and food of non-animal origin
