= Scientific Committee on Consumer Safety =

Independent scientific committee advising the European Commission

The Scientific Committee on Consumer Safety (SCCS) is one of the independent scientific committees managed by the Directorate-General for Health and Consumer Protection of the European Commission, which provide scientific advice to the commission on issues related to non-food issues. It is the successor to both the Scientific Committee on Consumer Products (SCCP) and the Scientific Committee on Cosmetic Products and Non-Food Products (SCCNFP).

== Activities ==
The Scientific Committee on Consumer Safety provides the European Commission with scientific advice on the safety of non-food consumer products. The SCCS's advice is intended to enable risk managers to take the adequate and required actions in order to guarantee consumer protection. The SCCS addresses questions in relation to the safety, allergenic properties, and impact on consumer health, of products and ingredients such as toys, textiles, clothing, cosmetics, personal care products, domestic products such as detergents, and consumer services such as tattooing. By the end of 2006 the SCCP had adopted close to 100 opinions or position papers on topics such as fragrances, hair dyes, sunbeds, tooth bleaching, preservatives, UV filters, and other substances.

== Procedures ==
The SCCS consists of a maximum of 17 members. There is also a reserve list made up of candidates found suitable for a position in a scientific committee. The members of the SCCS are appointed on the basis of their skills and experience in the fields in question, and consistent with this a geographical distribution that reflects the diversity of scientific problems and approaches in the European Union. The experts are appointed for three years, renewable a maximum of three consecutive times. In agreement with the commission, the scientific committees may turn to specialised external experts.

The SCCS complies with the principles of independence, transparency and confidentiality. The members therefore make a declaration of commitment to act in the public interest and a declaration of interests. Requests for opinions, agendas, minutes and opinions are published. The work and publications respect commercial confidentiality.

== History ==
The scientific committees were originally established by Commission Decision 97/404/EC of 10 June 1997. The Scientific Committee on Consumer Products (SCCP) was originally established as one of three scientific committees established by Commission Decision 2004/210/EC of 3 March 2004, replacing the former Scientific Committee on Cosmetic Products and Non-Food Products (SCCNFP). Commission Decision 2008/721/EC of 5 August 2008 reestablished the committee as the Scientific Committee on Consumer Safety (SCCS).

== See also ==
The Directorate-General for Health and Consumer Protection also manages two other independent scientific committees on non-food products:

- The Scientific Committee on Health and Environmental Risks (SCHER)
- The Scientific Committee on Emerging and Newly Identified Health Risks (SCENIHR)

For questions concerning the safety of food products, the European Commission consults the European Food Safety Authority (EFSA).
