= Scientific Committee on Health and Environmental Risks =

Independent scientific committee

- Abbreviation: SCHER
- Type: INGO
- Region served: Europa
- Official language: English, French
- Parent organization: Directorate-General for Health and Consumer Protection
- Website: SCHER Official website

The Scientific Committee on Health and Environmental Risks (SCHER) is one of the independent scientific committees managed by the Directorate-General for Health and Consumer Protection of the European Commission, which provide scientific advice to the Commission on issues related to consumer products.

== Activities ==
The SCHER provide the Commission with the scientific advice on questions relating to the toxicity and ecotoxicity of chemicals, biochemicals and biological compounds whose use may have harmful consequences for human health and the environment.

In particular, the SCHER addresses questions in relation to new and existing chemicals, the restriction and marketing of dangerous substances, biocides, waste, environmental contaminants, plastics and other materials used for water pipe work (e.g. new organic substances), drinking water, indoor and ambient air quality. It also addresses questions relating to human exposure to mixtures of chemicals, sensitisation and identification of endocrine disrupters.

== Procedures ==
The SCHER consists of a maximum of 19 members. The members are appointed on the basis of their skills and experience in the fields in question and consistent with this a geographical distribution that reflects the diversity of scientific problems and approaches in the European Union. The experts are appointed for three years, renewable for a maximum of three consecutive terms. In agreement with the Commission, the Scientific Committees may turn to specialized external experts.

SCHER's scientific advisory procedures are based on the principles of scientific excellence, independence and transparency. The Opinions of the Committees are made available as quickly as possible following a request for advice from the Commission. In addition, the agendas, minutes of plenary meetings and lists of members are published.

== See also ==
The Directorate-General for Health and Consumer Protection also manages two other independent Scientific Committees on non-food products:

- The Scientific Committee on Consumer Safety (SCCS)
- The Scientific Committee on Emerging and Newly Identified Health Risks (SCENIHR)

For questions concerning the safety of food products, the European Commission consults the European Food Safety Authority (EFSA).
