= Horse passport =

Documentation for horse transportation

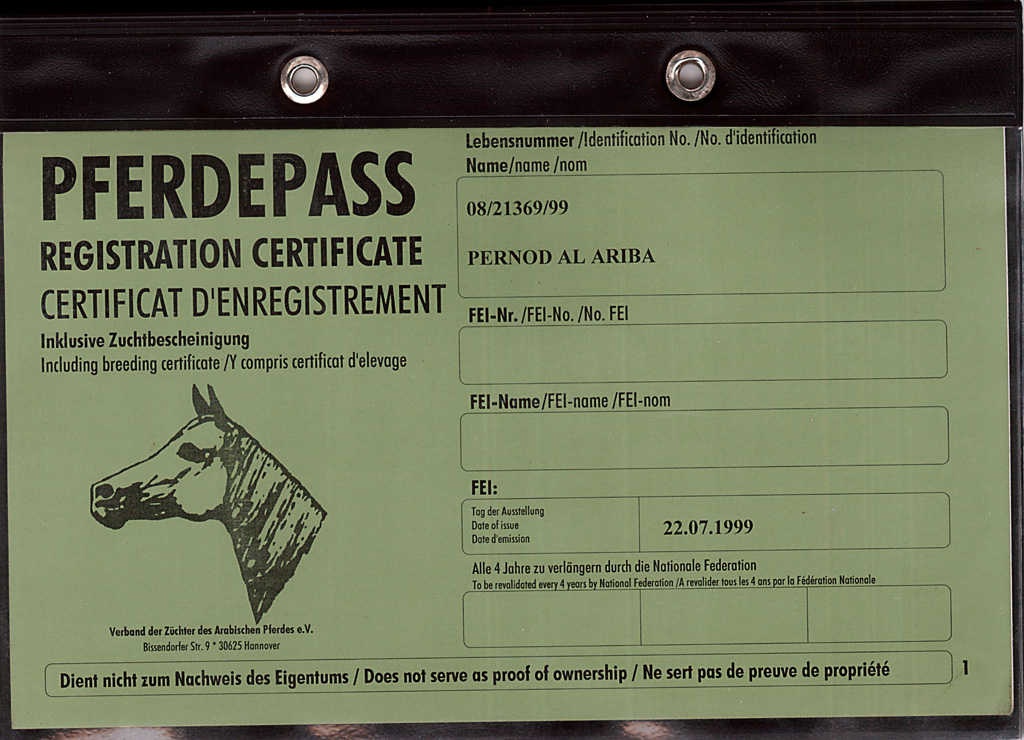
Horse passport for Pernod Al Ariba

A horse passport is documentation that allows horses to be accurately identified and more easily be transported internationally. In the United States, they are primarily intended for animals competing in International Federation for Equestrian Sports (FEI) events. In the United Kingdom, it is now required for all equines to have a "passport" and an animal cannot be sold without one.

The UK law, passed in 2003, allows owners to keep a horse from entering the food chain for slaughter by signing a declaration which allows the horse to be treated with medications that are inexpensive but not appropriate for animals that will be used as food. It also means the owners will have to find a means other than slaughter to dispose of an unwanted horse. All equines, including horses, ponies, donkeys and other equids, must have a passport and owners can be fined up to £5,000 if the animal does not.

In the United States, the United States Equestrian Federation (USEF) issues passports for FEI competition. To obtain a passport, the horse must be life-registered with the USEF, be owned by a U.S. Citizen, who must be a member of the USEF. The passport must be renewed every four years and updated if the animal changes ownership.
