= Directorate-General for Health and Food Safety =

European Union food safety organisation

The Directorate-General for Health and Food Safety (DG SANTE), until 2014 known as the Directorate-General for Health and Consumers (DG SANCO), is a directorate-general of the European Commission. The DG is responsible for the monitoring and implementation of European Union policies and laws on health and food safety. It is headed by European Commissioner for Health and Animal Welfare Olivér Várhelyi and Director-General Sandra Gallina.

== Structure ==
=== Directorates ===
The directorate-general is made up of eight directorates (as of October 2022):

- Directorate A: One Health
- Directorate B: Public Health, Cancer and Health Security
- Directorate C: Digital, EU4Health and Health Systems Modernisation
- Directorate D: Medical Products and Innovation
- Directorate E: Food Safety, Sustainability and Innovation
- Directorate F: Health and Food Audits and Analysis
- Directorate G: Crisis Preparedness in Food, Animals and Plants
- Directorate R: Policy and Administrative Support

Directorates A, C, D, E, G and R are based in Brussels, Directorate B is based in Luxembourg, and Directorate F in Grange, County Meath, Ireland. While Directorates B, C and D belong to the health pillar and E, F and G to the food safety pillar, A and R are horizontal Directorates working across both pillars.

Rapid Alert System for Food and Feed is the EC's food safety rapid alert system.

=== Scientific committees ===
DG SANTE manages two independent scientific committees:

- the Scientific Committee on Consumer Safety (SCCS)
- the Scientific Committee on Health, Environmental and Emerging Risks (SHEER)

These scientific committees provide the European Commission with the scientific advice on non-food products that it needs when preparing policy and proposals relating to consumer safety, public health and the environment. The committees also draw the commission's attention to new or emerging problems which may pose an actual or potential threat.

=== Agencies ===
DG SANTE is linked to one executive agency, the Health and Digital Executive Agency (HaDEA), as well as several decentralised agencies of the European Union such as the European Food Safety Authority (EFSA), which the European Commission consults for questions concerning the safety of food products, the Community Plant Variety Office (CPVO), which administers a system of plant variety rights, and the European Centre for Disease Prevention and Control (ECDC), which helps the European Union combat communicable diseases and other serious health threats.

== See also ==
- European Commissioner for Health and Food Safety
- European Centre for Disease Prevention and Control (ECDC)
- European Health Examination Survey
- Health Threat Unit
