= New Forest commoner =

New Forest resident with local land rights

A New Forest commoner (also known as a New Forester, Commoner or Forester) is a person who owns common land with recognized historical rights in the New Forest area of Southern England. The term is used both for a practitioner of the heritage agricultural vocation of commoning, and also a cultural minority native to the area. They are closely associated with the New Forest pony. In 2020, there were about 700 New Forest commoners.

Areas of common land in and around the New Forest are linked to established historical rights, some dating back to the Anglo-Saxon period. These include rights of pasture, mast, marl, turbary, sheep-grazing, and fuelwood. The landowners entitled to these rights – often families who have held common land for generations – are known as commoners. Only they have the legal authority to exercise the rights attached to their holdings.

The contribution of New Forest commoners to maintaining the area's ecology and landscape, as well as their historic role as a living tradition and heritage cultural minority, has been recognised by the Government of the United Kingdom, and the New Forest National Park Authority has acknowledged its commitment to protecting and supporting the community and the practice.

== History ==
Following the Norman Conquest, the Anglo-Saxon Ytene Forest was proclaimed a royal forest, about 1079, by William the Conqueror. It was renamed as Nova Foresta and used for royal hunts, mainly of deer. It was created at the expense of more than 20 small hamlets and isolated farmsteads; hence it was then 'new' as a single compact area.

Though Forest laws were now enacted to preserve this "New Forest" as a location for royal deer hunting, and interference with the king's deer and its forage was punished, the inhabitants of the area (commoners) had pre-existing Anglo-Saxon rights of common which were recognised by the Crown and governed by verderers. These common rights were passed on generationally through local families alongside the land that they were tied to, and over the centuries cohered a number of historic cultural practices, customs and values which are maintained to this day.

Though the rights were re-confirmed by statute in 1698, throughout the 18th century a number of tree plantations were created within the area to supply timber for the Royal Navy, a number of which encroached on the rights of the commoners. In response to this, the Forest gained new protection under the New Forest Act 1877, which again re-confirmed the historic rights of the commoners and entrenched that the total of enclosures was henceforth not to exceed 65 km^{2} (25 sq mi) at any time. It also reconstituted the Court of Verderers as representatives of the commoners (rather than the Crown). As of 2005, roughly 90% of the New Forest is still owned by the Crown. In 1909 the Commoners Defence Association was established to defend the commoners' rights from increasing pressure. The Crown lands have been managed by Forestry England since 1923 and most of the Crown lands now fall inside the new National Park.

Further New Forest Acts followed in 1949, 1964 and 1970. The New Forest became a Site of Special Scientific Interest in 1971, and was granted special status as the New Forest Heritage Area in 1985, with additional planning controls added in 1992. The New Forest was proposed as a UNESCO World Heritage Site in June 1999, but UNESCO did not take up the nomination. It became a National Park in March 2005, transferring a wide variety of planning and control decisions to the New Forest National Park Authority, who work alongside the local authorities, land owners and crown estates in managing the New Forest.

== Cultural minority ==
A New Forest commoner is distinguished from holders of rights over common land elsewhere by the unbroken lineage of the practice, and the expansive cultural and community heritage that surrounds and defines it.

Commoners define themselves by their cultural practices, which are over a thousand years old, their community and their native territory of the New Forest. According to Phoebe Weston, writing in the Guardian, "Very few outsiders learn to become proper New Forest commoners. It’s not just biodiversity, it’s human heritage that’s being preserved here". The commoner community is based around a number of historic local families, many of whom have been practising commoners for as long as records exist, and who have passed knowledge and custom on through a generational oral and vocational tradition. The Commoners Defence Association considers that "Commoning isn’t just about animals. It’s about people. It is about family, community, and New Forest skills. The cultural heritage of the New Forest lies much more in these people than it does in buildings or other physical features of the landscape."

The 2011 census of New Forest commoners confirmed that "When respondents were asked the main reasons that they continue to turn out, the single most often repeated reason was that commoning is a way of life, a tradition based on family and community. 41% of all comments made include expressions such as ‘it’s in my blood; I love the life’, ‘(it is a) family tradition that it is important to continue’ and ‘it’s a community I love being part of and something I want my children to have the opportunity to continue’ ... ‘Because it has been in the family for generations and is a way of life’".

== Commoners' rights ==
Commoners' rights are attached to particular plots of land (or in the case of turbary, to particular hearths), and different land has different rights – and some of this land is some distance from the Forest itself. These rights are recorded and documented in the Atlas of Rights maintained by the verderers. The rights of common are: to turn horses and cattle (but only rarely sheep) out into the Forest to graze (common pasture), to gather fuel wood (estovers), to cut peat for fuel (turbary), to dig clay (marl), and to turn out pigs between September and November to eat fallen acorns and beechnuts (pannage or mast). There were also licences granted to gather bracken after Michaelmas Day (29 September) as litter for animals (fern).

=== Common pasture ===
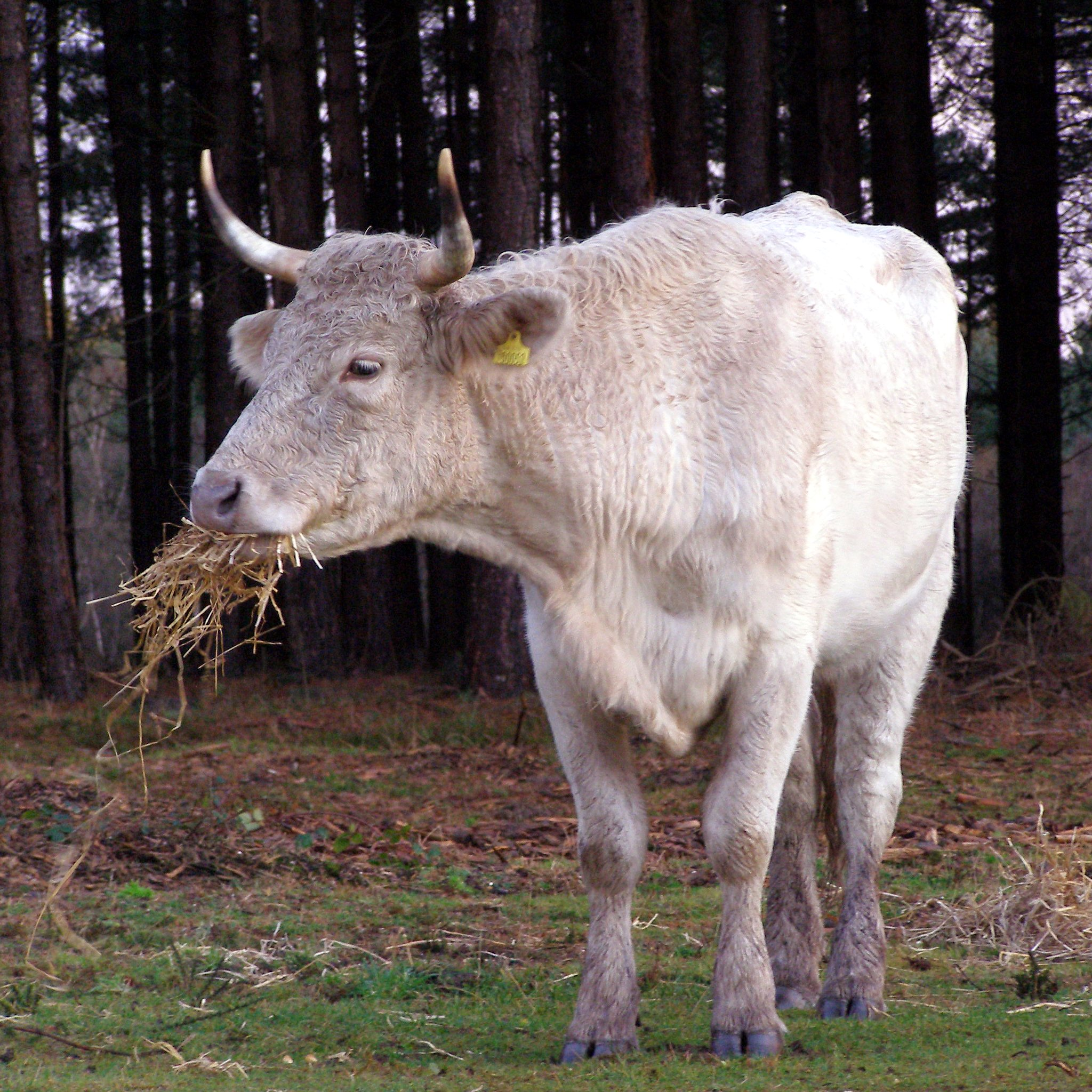
Cow eating winter feed, Longdown Inclosure

The principle of levancy and couchancy applies generally to the right of pasture. Commoners must have backup land, outside the Forest, to accommodate these depastured animals when necessary, for example during a foot-and-mouth disease epidemic. Rights to graze ponies and cattle are thus not for a fixed number of animals, as is often the case on other commons. Instead a "marking fee" is paid for each animal each year by the owner. The marked animal's tail is trimmed by the local agister, with each of the four or five forest agisters using a different trimming pattern. Ponies are branded with the owner's brand mark; cattle may be branded, or nowadays may have the brand mark on an ear tag. Grazing of commoners' ponies and cattle is an essential part of the management of the forest, helping to maintain the heathland, bog, grassland and wood-pasture habitats and their associated wildlife.

=== Estovers, turbary and marl ===
Whilst the right of estovers (fuelwood) was originally a right to cut firewood from trees directly, today it exists instead as a "free supply of a stipulated amount of firewood to certain properties", as defined by the verderers. The rights of marl (the right to cut and dig clay in order to improve agricultural land) and turbary (the right to cut peat and turf to burn as fuel) are no longer exercised. The changes to these three rights are due to the necessity of environmental protection for the National Park.

=== Mast and pannage ===
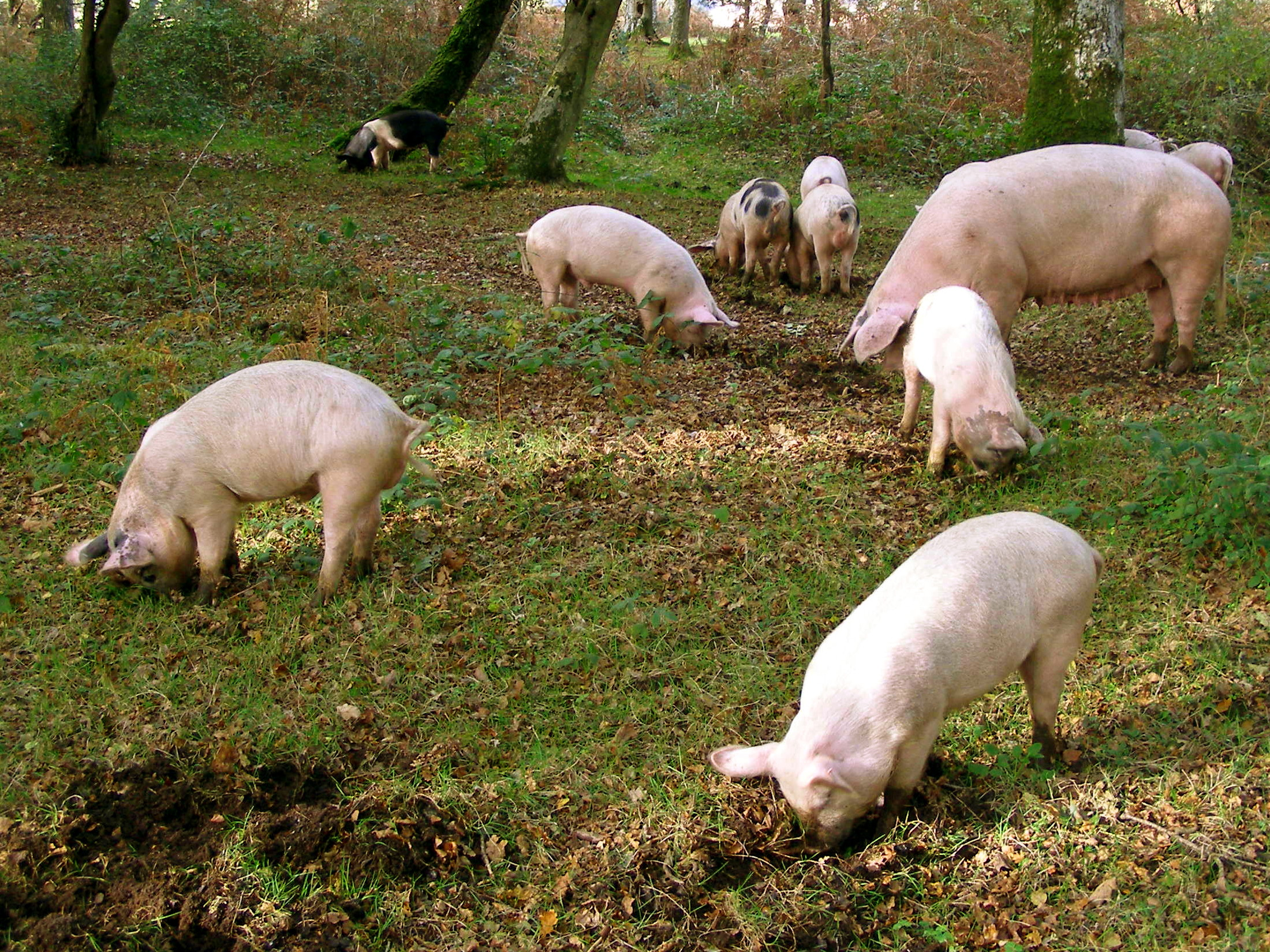
Pannage of a sow and her piglets, Ober Water, New Forest

Along with grazing, pannage is still an important part of the Forest's ecology. Pigs can eat acorns without problem, but for ponies and cattle, large quantities of acorns can be poisonous. Pannage always lasts at least 60 days, but the start date varies according to the weather – and when the acorns fall. The verderers decide when pannage will start each year. At other times the pigs must be taken in and kept on the owner's land, with the exception that pregnant sows, known as privileged sows, are always allowed out providing they are not a nuisance and return to the commoner's holding at night (they must not be "levant and couchant" in the Forest, that is, they may not consecutively feed and sleep there). This last is an established practice rather than a formal right.

== New Forest pony ==
The New Forest Pony is a breed, recognised as iconic and indicative of the New Forest area and the New Forest commoners. They, together with the cattle, donkeys, pigs, sheep and the commoners themselves, are known as "the architects of the Forest": it is the grazing and browsing of the commoners' animals over a thousand years which created the New Forest ecosystem as it is today.

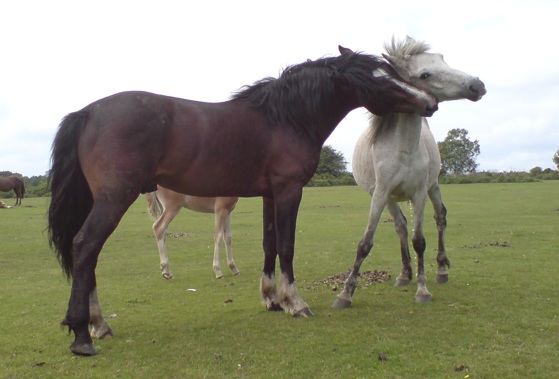
Stallion engaging in courtship behaviour with a mare near Homlsley Camp

The cattle and ponies living on the New Forest are not completely feral, but are owned by the commoners, who pay an annual fee for each animal turned out. The animals are looked after by their owners and by the Agisters employed by the Verderers of the New Forest. The Verderers are a statutory body with ancient roots, who share management of the forest with the Forestry Commission and National park authority. Approximately 80 per cent of the animals depastured on the New Forest are owned by just 10 per cent of the commoning families.

Ponies living full-time on the New Forest are almost all mares, although there are also a few geldings. For much of the year the ponies live in small groups, usually consisting of an older mare, her daughters, and their foals, all keeping to a discrete area of the Forest called a "haunt." Under New Forest regulations, mares and geldings may be of any breed. Although the ponies are predominantly New Foresters, other breeds such as Shetlands and their crossbred descendants may be found in some areas.

Stallions must be registered New Foresters, and are not allowed to run free all year round on the Forest. They normally are turned out only for a limited period in the spring and summer, when they gather several groups of mares and youngstock into larger herds and defend them against other stallions. A small number (usually fewer than 50) are turned out, generally between May and August. This ensures that foals are born neither too early (before the spring grass is coming through), nor too late (as the colder weather is setting in and the grazing and browsing on the Forest is dying back) in the following year.

Colts are assessed as two-year-olds by the New Forest Pony Breeding and Cattle Society for suitability to be kept as stallions; any animal failing the assessment must be gelded. Once approved, every spring (usually in March), the stallions must pass the Verderers' assessment before they are permitted onto the Forest to breed. The stallion scheme resulted in a reduction of genetic diversity in the ponies running out on the New Forest, and to counteract this and preserve the hardiness of Forest-run ponies, the Verderers introduced the Bloodline Diversity Project, which will use hardy Forest-run mares, mostly over eleven years old, bred to stallions that have not been run out on the Forest, or closely related to those that have.

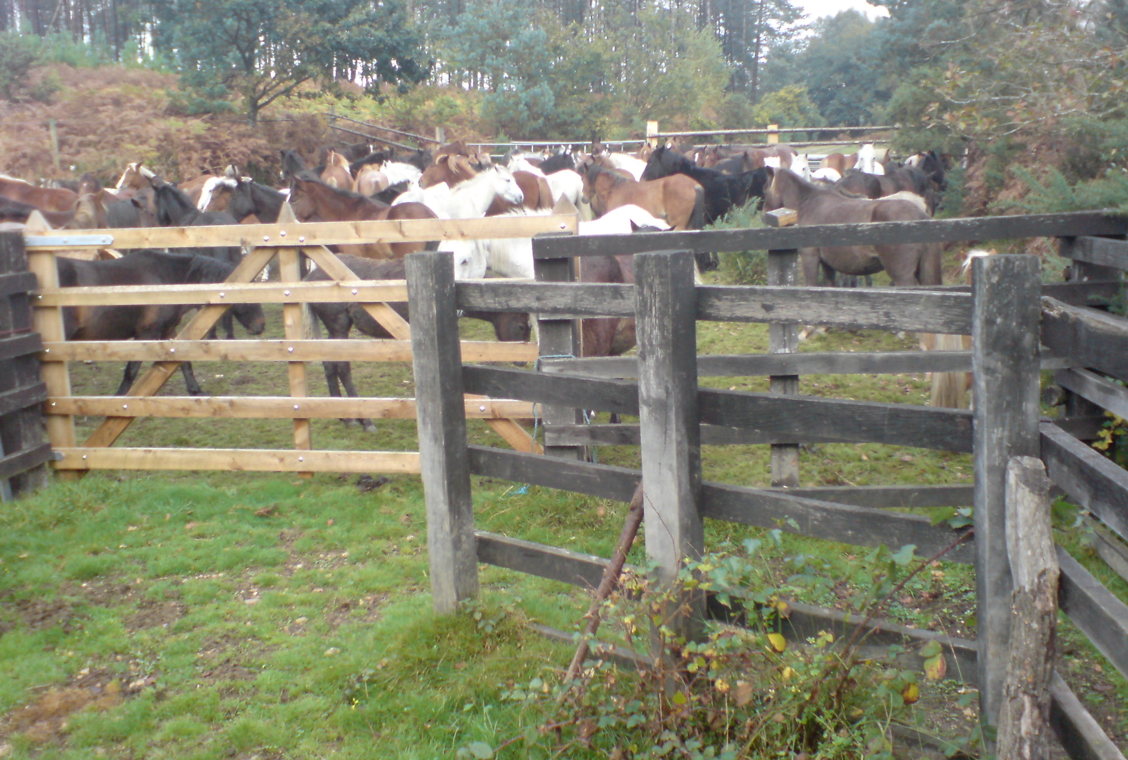
Ponies gathered in a pound at a drift

Drifts to gather the animals are carried out in autumn. Most colts and some fillies are removed, along with any animals considered too "poor" to remain on the Forest over the winter. The remaining fillies are branded with their owner's mark, and many animals are wormed. Many owners choose to remove a number of animals from the Forest for the winter, turning them out again the following spring. Animals surplus to their owner's requirements often are sold at the Beaulieu Road Pony Sales, run by the New Forest Livestock Society. Tail hair of the ponies is trimmed, and cut into a recognisable pattern to show that the pony's grazing fees have been paid for the year. Each Agister has his own "tail-mark", indicating the area of the Forest where the owner lives. The Agisters keep a constant watch over the condition of the Forest-running stock, and an animal may be "ordered off" the Forest at any time. The rest of the year, the lives of the ponies are relatively unhindered unless they need veterinary attention or additional feeding, when they are usually taken off the Forest.

The open nature of the New Forest means that ponies are able to wander onto roads. The ponies actually have right of way over vehicles and many wear reflective collars in an effort to reduce traffic fatalities, but despite this, many ponies, along with commoners' cattle, pigs, and donkeys are killed or injured in road traffic accidents every year. Human interaction with ponies is also a problem; well meaning but misguided visitors to the forest frequently feed them, which can create dietary problems and sickness (e.g. colic) and cause the ponies to adopt an aggressive attitude in order to obtain human food.

New Forest ponies are raced in an annual point to point meeting in the Forest, usually on Boxing Day, finishing at a different place each year. The races do not have a fixed course, but instead are run across the open Forest, so competitors choose their own routes around obstructions such as inclosures (forestry plantations), fenced paddocks, and bogs. Riders with a detailed knowledge of the Forest are thus at an advantage. The location of the meeting place is given to competitors on the previous evening, and the starting point of the race is revealed once riders have arrived at the meeting point.
