= Agister (New Forest) =

UK employee of the New Forest verderers

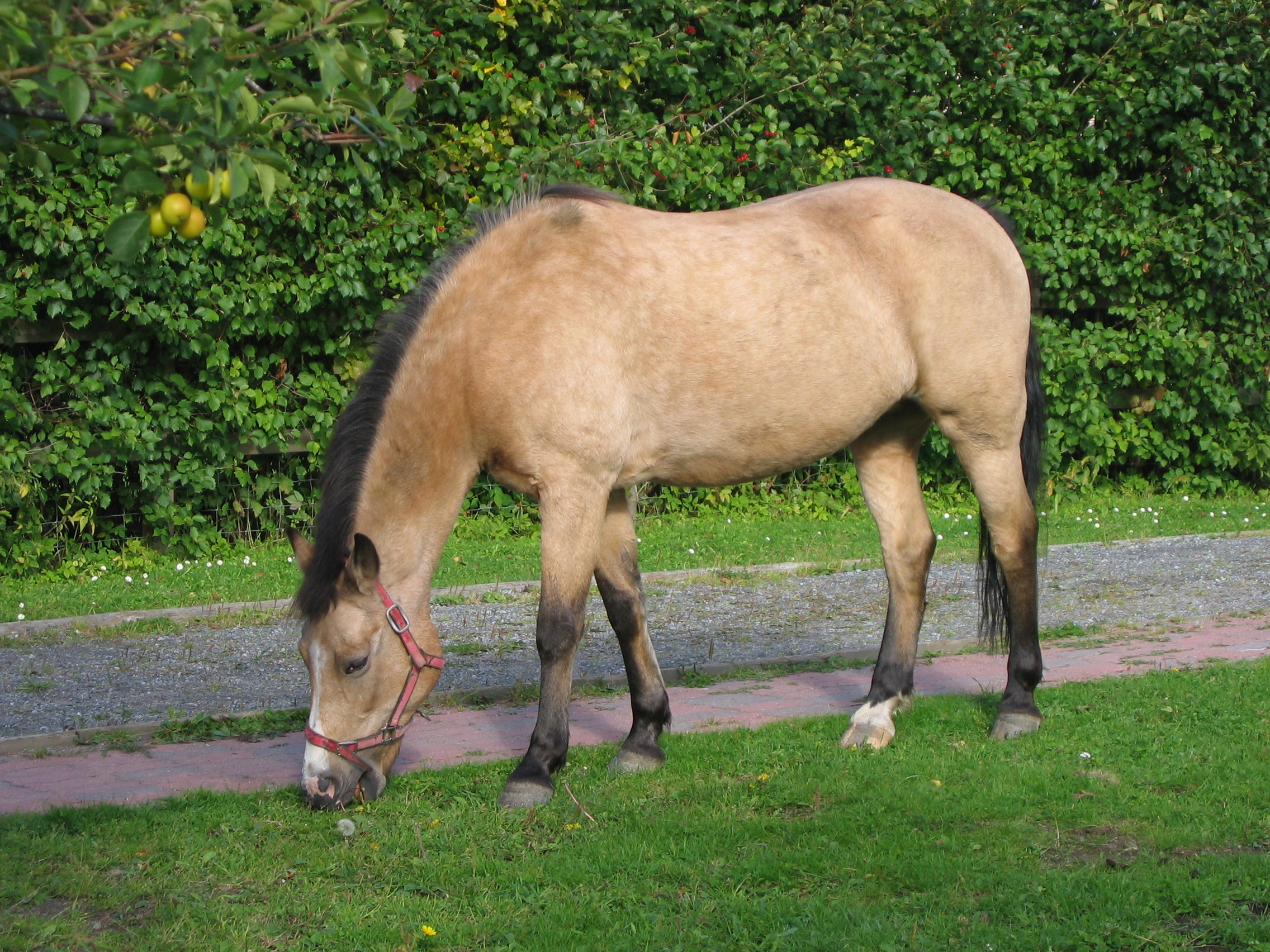
New Forest pony mare

In the New Forest, an agister (/ˈadʒɪstə/) is a local official whose role is to assist the verderers with their duty to manage the free-roaming animals that the New Forest commoners are allowed to release onto the forest. Several thousand semi-wild ponies run free, along with several thousand cattle and smaller numbers of donkeys, sheep and (in autumn) pigs. These are owned by the commoners who pay an annual grazing fee known as the ‘marking fee’. There are currently five New Forest agisters employed by the Court of Verderers, each with responsibility for a specific forest area.

The post of agister is medieval in origin, the name deriving from the word ‘agist’ meaning 'to take in to graze for payment'. Originally agisters were known as ‘marksmen’, from their role in collecting the marking fees – a role which they still have today.

Agisters spend much of their time out on the forest, often on horseback, checking the condition of the land and of the commoners’ ponies and other stock. They are on call 24 hours a day to deal with problems such as stuck, straying or injured animals. They also watch out for breaches of the verderers’ bylaws and for the presence on the forest of unauthorised animals.

Each year between mid August and early November the agisters organise regular ‘pony drifts’, in which the commoners gather in their ponies for an annual welfare check. Rounded-up ponies are recorded and checked by the agisters against the marking fees paid by their owners. Any pony that the owner wishes to sell or to take in for the winter can be removed from the forest at this point. The remaining ponies have their tails clipped in a distinctive manner to identify those normally living in a particular agister’s area, and they are turned back out for another twelve months.

== See also ==
- Agistment
