= Verderer (New Forest) =

Official responsible for the New Forest, UK

In the New Forest a verderer is an unpaid officer whose duty is to regulate and protect the interests of the New Forest commoners, and to preserve the natural beauty and good traditional character of the Forest. There are ten verderers, together constituting the Court of Verderers (or Court of Swainmote).

== The Court of Verderers ==
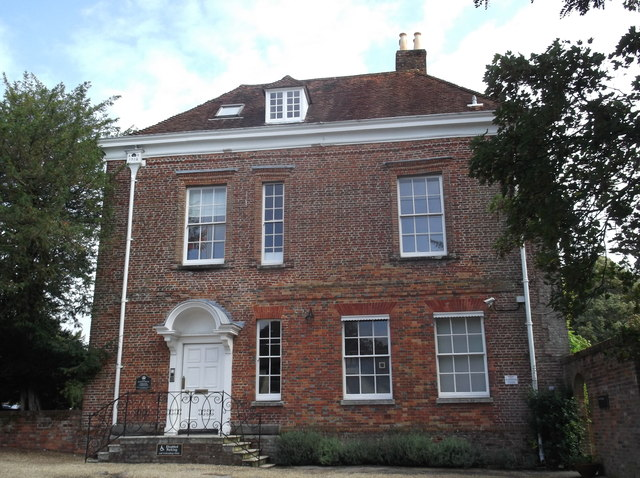
King's House, Lyndhurst, where the Court meets in open session

The Court has ancient origins but in its present form is a corporate body set up under the New Forest Act 1887 and reconstituted in 1949. It consists of ten verderers, five of whom are elected by the commoners, and four of whom are appointed respectively by the Department for Environment, Food and Rural Affairs, the Forestry Commission, the National Park Authority, and Natural England. The remaining position is held by the Official Verderer who serves as chair of the Court and who is appointed by the Sovereign.

The Court has the same status as a Magistrates Court, and acting under its authority the verderers are responsible for regulating commoning within the Forest, for dealing with unlawful inclosures, and for a wide range of other matters relating to development control and conservation such as proposals for new roads, car parks, camping sites, recreational facilities, playing fields and so on.

The verderers also work to ensure the health and welfare of the commoners' animals, and to assist with this they employ five paid agisters whose role is to supervise the animals’ day-to-day welfare.

The Court of Verderers normally meets in open session once a month (other than August and December), at which ‘presentments’ may be made by any commoner or other person. These are oral or written statements such as a concern or a complaint relating to the Forest that the petitioner wishes the Court to deal with. Where the presentment relates to a contentious matter, the Court may order that counter-presentments be heard in open court at a later date.

The verderers work closely with the Forestry Commission, an appointee of which is a member of the Court. Some activities the Commission carries out or permits within the Forest may be subject to rights of common, and thus require the verderers’ consent, while in the case of other activities the Commission may have a statutory power to override those rights or to proceed subject to consultation. To avoid misunderstandings, in 2002 the verderers and the Commission concluded a Memorandum of Understanding to help the parties determine how to handle specific activities that the Commission proposes to undertake or permit within the Forest.

The New Forest became a National Park on 1 March 2005. It is managed by a government-funded organisation, the National Park Authority, which appoints one of the Court members. The verderers have a statutory duty (under section 62 of the Environment Act 1995) to take account of the purposes of National Park designation when making any decision which affects the Park.

== History ==
In the 13th century the verderers were originally a court that was authorised by The Crown to deal with minor offences taking place within the Sovereign's Forest. Their powers were enlarged in the 17th and 18th centuries to enable the Court to deal with trespassers, and acts such as breaking inclosure fences which were detrimental to the planting and preservation of oak for shipbuilding.

Under the New Forest Act 1887 the court was placed on a statutory basis, with the verderers becoming responsible for commoners, common rights, and the Forest landscape. The New Forest Act 1949 gave the verderers additional powers to make and amend byelaws. Subsequent legislation of 1964, 1967 and 1970 has increased the range of issues the court is required to approve or to be consulted on.

== See also ==
- Verderer
- New Forest Commoner
- Agister
- Reeve (England)
