= Sierra del Sueve =

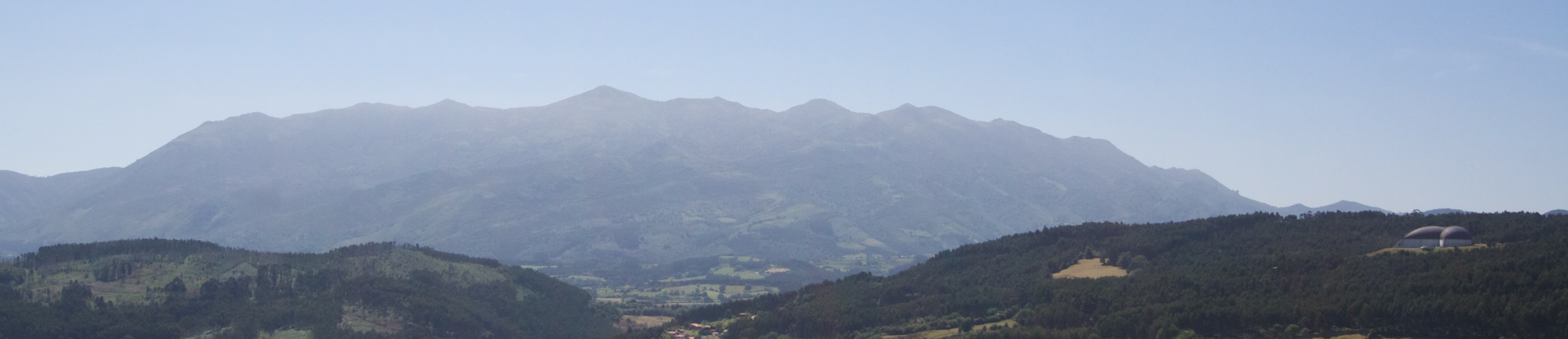
- Panoramic view of Sierra del Sueve

Highest point
- Peak: Picu Pienzu
- Elevation: 1,161 m (3,809 ft)

Dimensions
- Length: 25 km (16 mi) NE/SW
- Width: 9 km (5.6 mi) NW/SE

Geography
- Location within Spain
- Location: Asturias
- Country: Spain
- Range coordinates: 43°25′30″N 5°16′00″W
- Parent range: Cantabrian Mountains

Geology
- Orogeny: Alpine orogeny
- Rock age: Carboniferous
- Rock type: Limestone

Sierra del Sueve
- Protected Landscape
- Protected Landscape Area of Sierra del Sueve
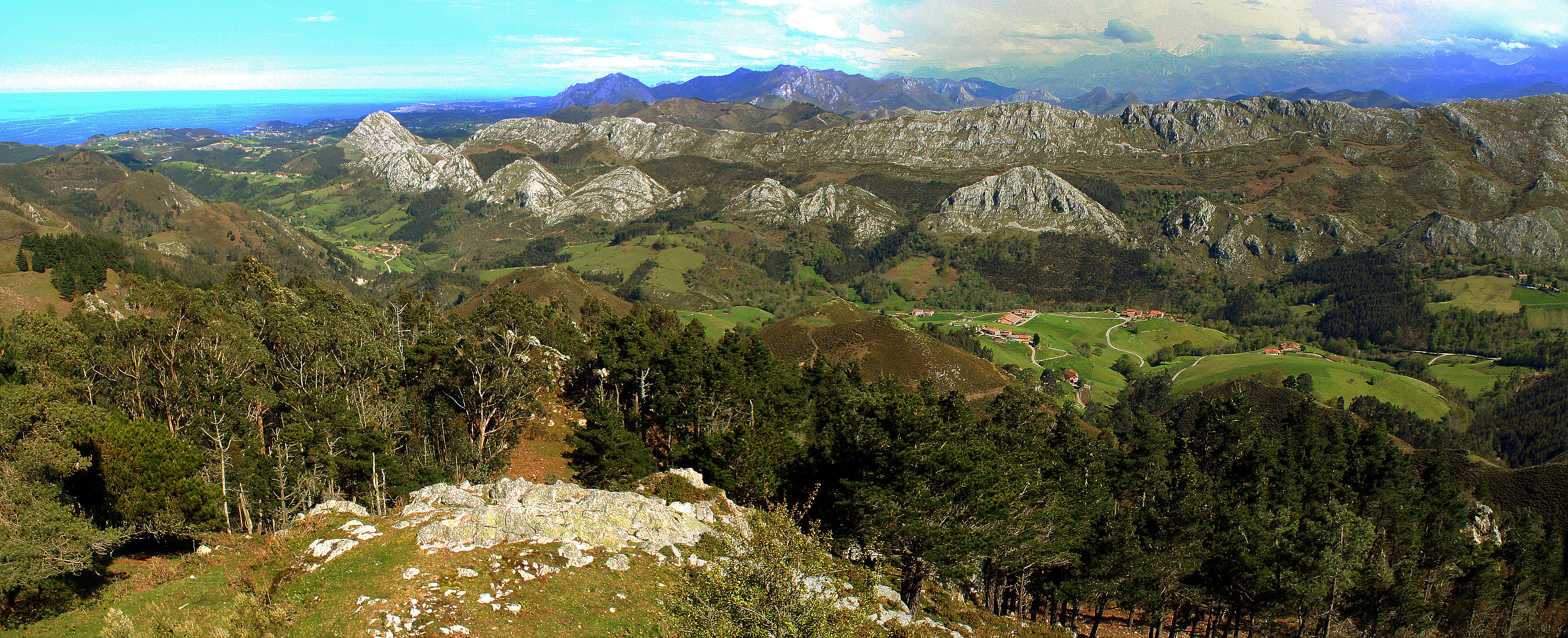
- Panoramic view of Sierra del Sueve from atop El Fito

- Location of Protected Landscape Area of Sierra del Sueve in Asturias
- Country: Spain

Area
  - Total: 210 km^{2} (81 sq mi)

The Sierra del Sueve is a limestone massif located close to the coast in the east-central area of Asturias, Spain. It is a northern foothill of the Cantabrian Mountains. The range is located in the municipalities of northeast Caravia, Colunga in the northwest, Piloña, Parres and Ribadesella to the east and south.

== Geography ==
The Sierra del Sueve is calcareous. In the westernmost section, shales, limestone, and sandstone form smooth river valleys that contrast with the eastern section, which is dominated by quartzite. In the central section, the limestone range is the main relief. Sinkhole karst are a dominant geomorphological feature in the Sierra del Sueve.

There are two adjacent ranges, the Sueve whose highest peak is the Picu Pienzu at 1,161 metres (3,809 ft) above sea level, and the El Fito (Fitu), a small mountain, with a peak of the same name. These mostly consist of limestone and quartzite.

The climate is humid and rainy, with mild temperatures due to the proximity to the sea. At the summit, fog is abundant due to the sea effects. Wind is common.

== Protected area ==
The area is a protected landscape that includes with both the range and the coast. Covering an area of 210 square kilometres (81 sq mi), it is divided between the municipalities of Caravia, Colunga, Parres, Piloña, and Ribadesella.

The Sueve Range includes a Regional Hunting Reserve within its limits. Its proximity to the sea adds to its ecological value. Farming and mountain grazing areas for cows, goats, sheep, horses and ponies are also part of the landscape.

=== Flora ===
Though Sierra del Sueve manifests a high degree of deforestation, it retains some remnants of forest. La Biescona is a beech forest in the northern area of the range close to the coast where there are clumps of chestnut trees and the remains of pine and eucalyptus reforestation, scattered between areas of shrubland and meadows. The most notable forested area is at the northern end where the trees are clumped and dominated by holly groves and espinera while also containing other species such as ash, beech, birch, elm, hazel, maple, yew, Wild Pear and brush.

Lastly, at the base of the mountain on its north side, there is a microclimate and an enclave of ferns whose distribution in such a non-tropical area makes them very rare, not only in Asturias but throughout Europe. In the populated shores, ferns include rare mattress ferns or helechilla and estando ambas (Trichomanes speciosum); both species are listed under the Catalogue Regional Threatened Flora.

=== Fauna ===
Wildlife includes fox, wild boar, feral pigs (Sus scrofa), roe deer, and the Asturian horse breed of Asturcon. Asturias, found in the high mountains of Sierra del Sueve are rare species with black or bay colour but without any white pigmentation. It is a small breed that does not trot but moves with an easy gait, leading to its popularity as a "ladies' mount". The Romans called this breed “asturcones”. This breed, which was facing extinction, has been protected by breed associations for further breeding.

The deer species of Dama dama (female), which was reintroduced in the 1960s for hunting adopted well to the region and their population had to be often controlled. However, efforts to introduce male deer, the stag (Cervus elaphus), were not successful and they moved away to other places in the eastern areas near Fito. Vertebrate fauna are also a species of special concern. Also present here are the Alpine chough (Pyrrhocorax graculus), the golden eagle (Aquila chrysaetos), cave bats (Miniopterus schreibersi) and reptiles such as the mountain lizard (Iberolacerta monticola).

Birds of prey include the Egyptian vulture (Neophron percnopterus), a threatened species.

== Tourism ==
Sierra del Sueve can be accessed by road from Infiesto and Colunga by the AS-258; the AS-432 to La Torre; and also the N-632. The viewpoint at the peak of Fitu provides excellent vistas of the shallow coastal zone from Caravia to Villaviciosa.

Hiking and mountaineering are favoured in the range. There are routes that begin in the town of Carandía; another through Portil, the MUA and Requexu lake; and another from Piloña. An Interpretation Center of the Sierra del Sueve was established in April 2007 by the City of Colunga to guide visitors on visit the sea and mountains.
