= Asturcón =

Spanish breed of horse

Asturcon
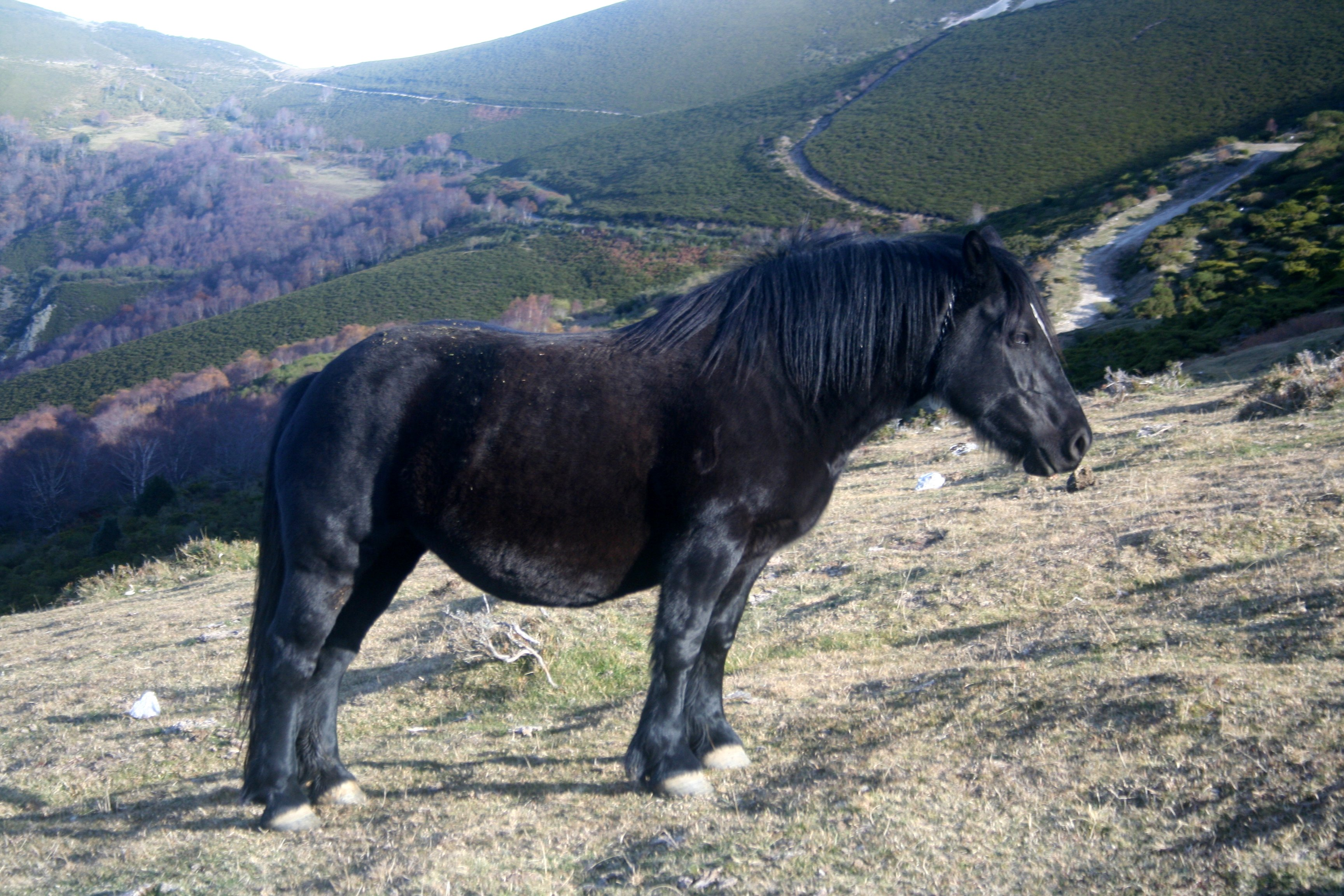
- Conservation status: FAO (2007): endangered-maintained; DAD-IS (2023): at risk/endangered
- Other names: Asturian Pony
- Country of origin: Spain
- Distribution: Asturias, elsewhere in Spain
- Standard: Principado de Asturias (in Spanish, pages 2–5)

Traits
- Weight: Male: 275 kg; Female: 250 kg
- Height: 130–147 cm; Male: 130 cm; Female: 123–125 cm
- Colour: black

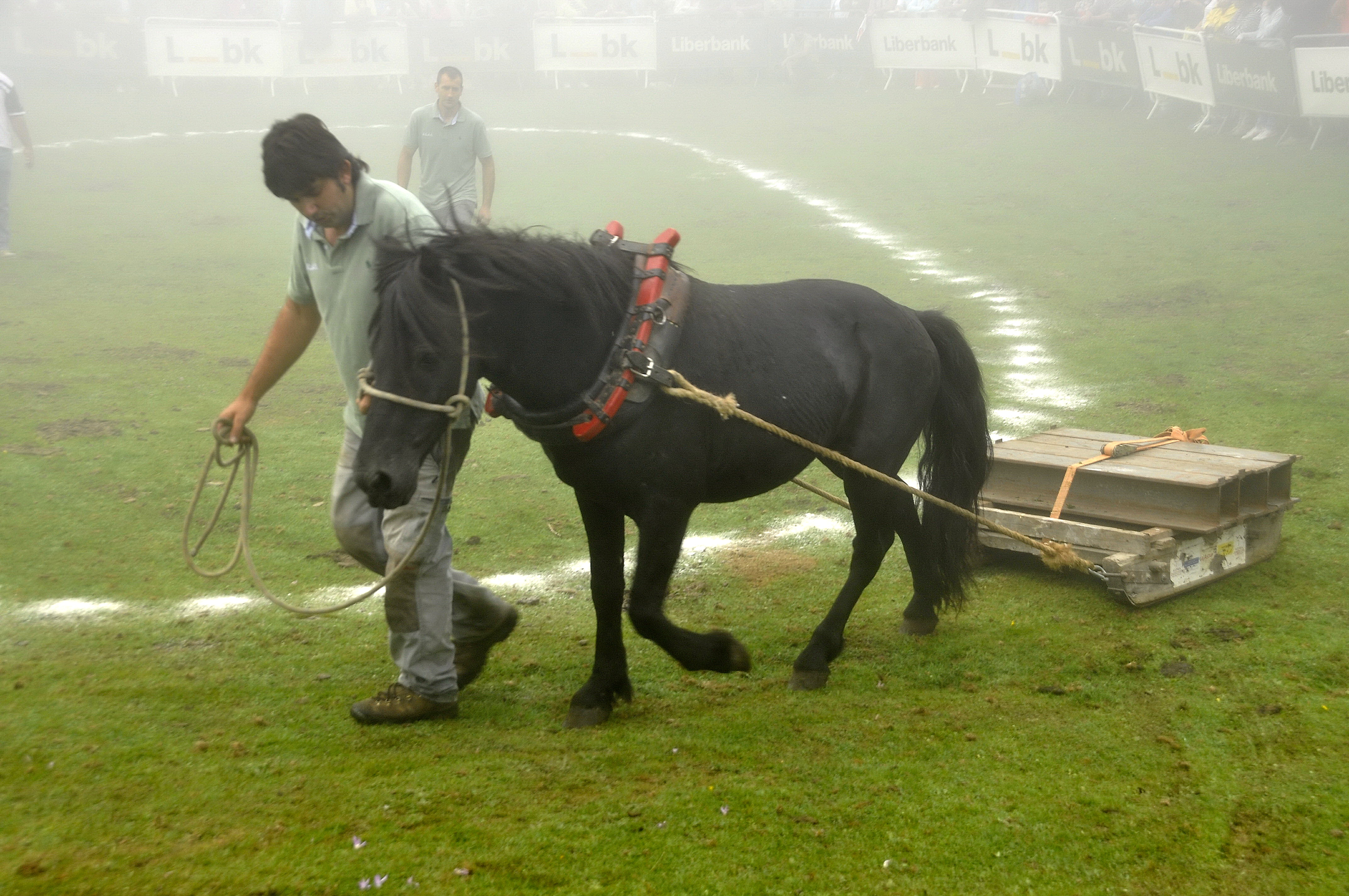
At the Fiesta del Asturcón in the Sierra del Sueve in 2015

The Asturcón is a Spanish breed of small horse or pony from the autonomous region of Asturias in the northern part of the country. It has been documented since Roman times: it has an unusual ambling gait, which was described by Pliny the Elder in his Naturalis Historia. It is of Celtic type, and shows similarity to the Pottok and Losino of Spain, the Garrano of Portugal, and the Dartmoor, Exmoor, Fell, Highland, Shetland and Welsh breeds of the British Isles.

== History ==
The Asturcón has been known and described since Roman times; it is mentioned in an epigram of Martial, and by Pliny the Elder in his Naturalis Historia, where he describes its characteristic ambling gait. The Latin word asturco was later used for other similar small horses with ambling gait.

At about the time of the Spanish Civil War, the population of the Asturcón separated into two distinct parts, one in the sierras of Sueve and La Vita, and the other further to the west, in the sierras of El Palo, La Bobia and Tineo. The two populations are genetically distinct.

A breeders' association, the Asociación de Criadores de Ponis de Raza Asturcón, was formed in 1987; at the time, there were 23 mares registered in the stud-book. At the end of 2003, there were 1181 head registered, in the hands of 94 breeders. In 2007 the Asturcón was listed by the Food and Agriculture Organization of the United Nations as "endangered-maintained". The total population at the end of 2024 was 3035 head in 334 herds; the breeding stock consisted of 1784 brood-mares and 409 stallions.

The Asturcón is thought to have given rise to the extinct Irish Hobby, and has been used in attempts to re-create that breed.

== Characteristics ==
The Asturcón is of Celtic type, and shows similarity to other Celtic breeds such as the Pottok and Losino of Spain and the Garrano of Portugal, and also to the Dartmoor, Exmoor, Fell, Highland, Shetland and Welsh breeds of the British Isles.

It is a small horse: height at the withers is usually in the range 125–135 cm, and never exceeds 147 cm. The average height for mares is variously reported at between 123 cm and 125 cm or at 130 cm, with an average weight of some 250 kg; stallions stand some 130 cm on average, with an average weight of 275 kg. The breed standard published in early 2012 by the Government of Asturias gives a height range of 130–147 cm.

In the early twenty-first century the only coat colour admitted for registration in the stud-book was black, with no marking other than a small frontal star. There was a small population of bay Asturian horses of Celtic type, but they were not registered in the Asturcón stud-book. Since 2012 the breed standard of the Government of Asturias has allowed bay and chestnut coat colours as well as black – still with no marking other than a small star.
