= Pottok =

Breed of pony

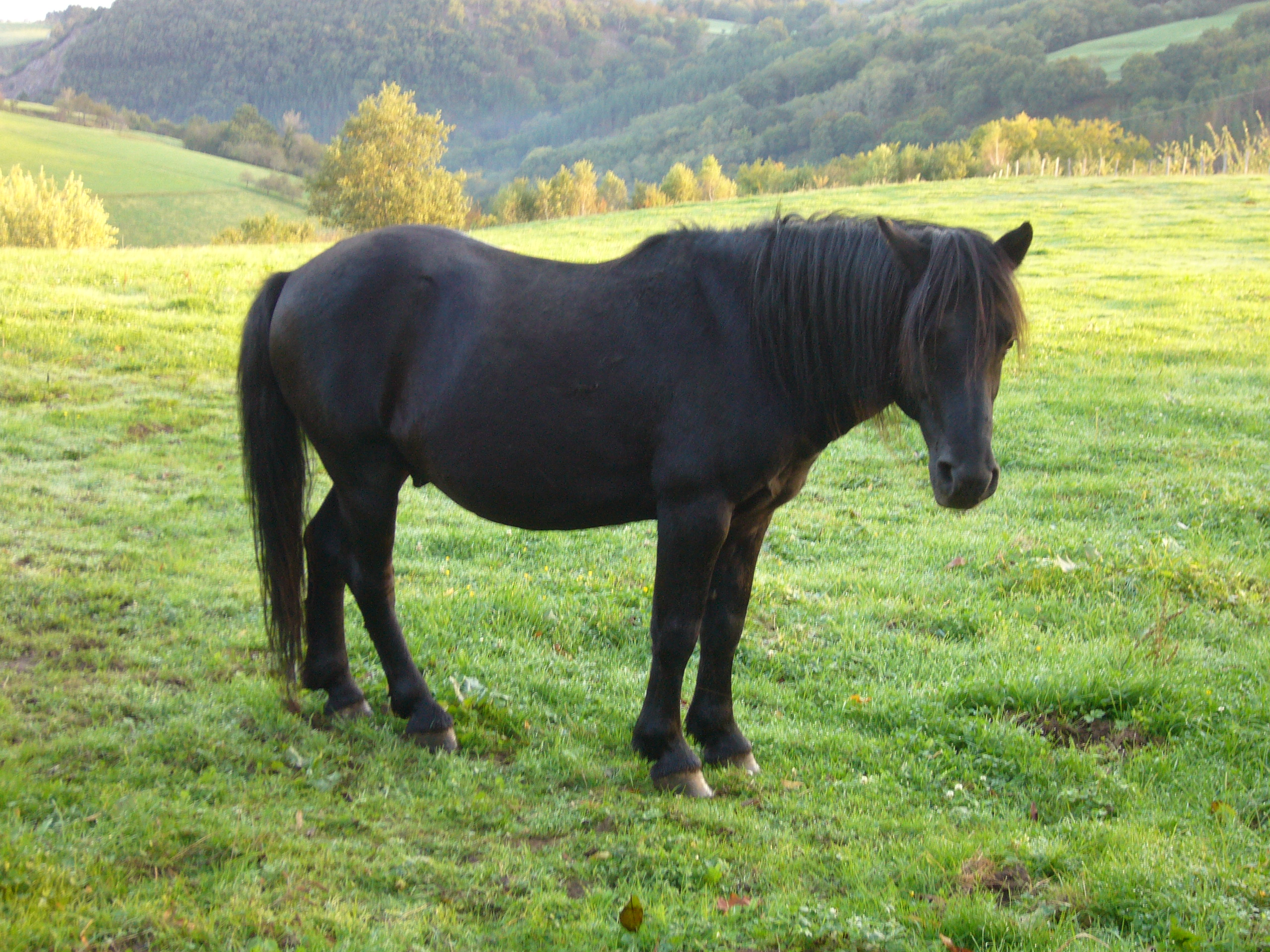
- Pottoka in the Pagoeta Nature Reserve.

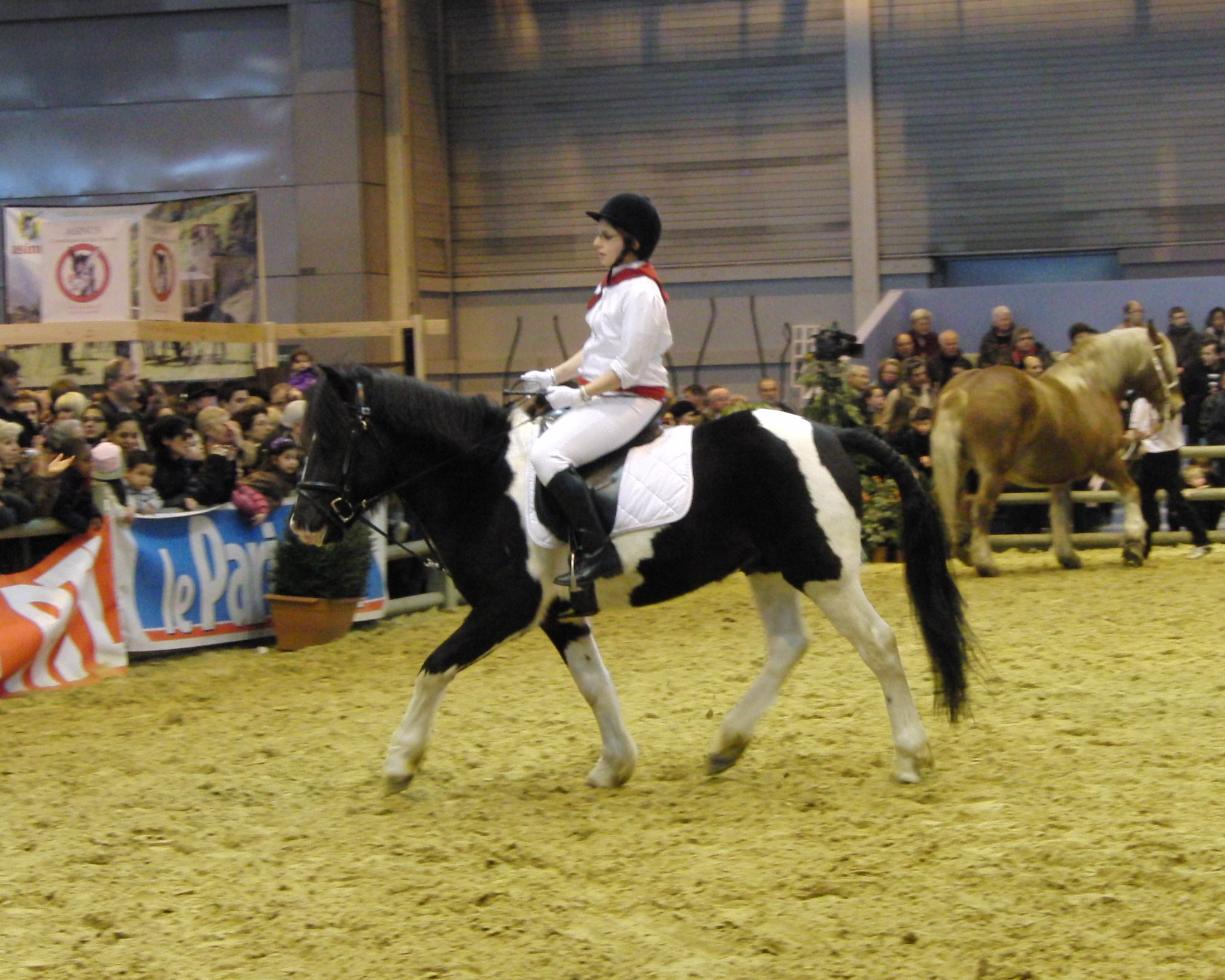
- Other names: Pottoka; Pottock
- Country of origin: Basque Country

Traits
- Distinguishing features: small, large head, heavy winter coat

Breed standards
- Les Haras Nationaux (France); Ingurumen, Lurralde Plangintza, Nekazaritza Eta Arrantza Saila; Departamento de Medio Ambiente, Planificación Territorial, Agricultura y Pesca; Schweizerischer Verband für Ponys und Kleinpferde; Fédération Suisse des Poneys et Petits Chevaux

The Pottok or Pottoka (/ˈpɒtək, -kə/ or /pəˈtjɒk, -kə/, Basque: pottoka [poˈcoka]), is an endangered, semi-feral breed of pony native to the Pyrenees of the Basque Country in France and Spain.

It is considered an ancient breed of horse, particularly well adapted to the harsh mountain areas it traditionally inhabits.

Once common, it is endangered through habitat loss, mechanization and crossbreeding but efforts are increasingly made to safeguard the future of this breed. It is considered iconic by the Basque people.

== Etymology ==
Pottoka is the Basque language name for this horse, both north and south of the mountains. In Upper Navarrese, potto and pottoka are generic terms for colts and young horses whereas in Lapurdian and Lower Navarrese the meaning of pottoka is "pony". Ultimately the name is linked to words such as pottolo "chubby, tubby".

In French sources, the spelling Pottok predominates. In English, both Pottoka and Pottok are encountered but the term Basque Pony can occasionally also be encountered.

== Origins ==
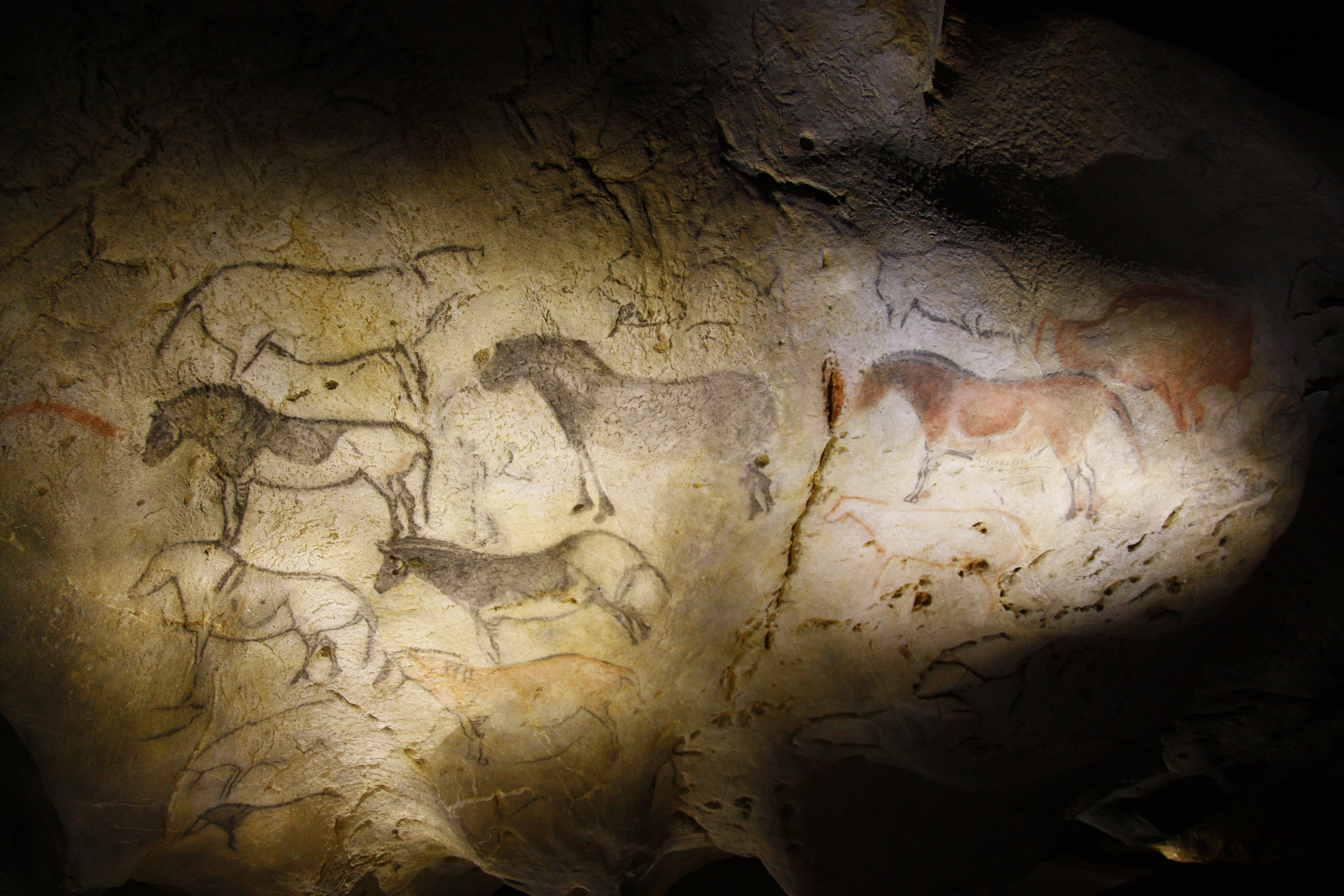
Paleolithic paintings of horses in the Ekainberri cave near Ekain, in Zestoa.

Many opinions exist on the origins of the Pottok. It is deemed by the scientific community to have lived in the area for at least several thousand years. It displays signs of genetic isolation and is genetically closest to breeds like the Asturcón, the Losino, the Galician, the Landais, and the Monchino horses. Tests have revealed considerable genetic differences between populations in the Northern Basque Country and the Southern Basque Country, leading some to consider them separate breeds.

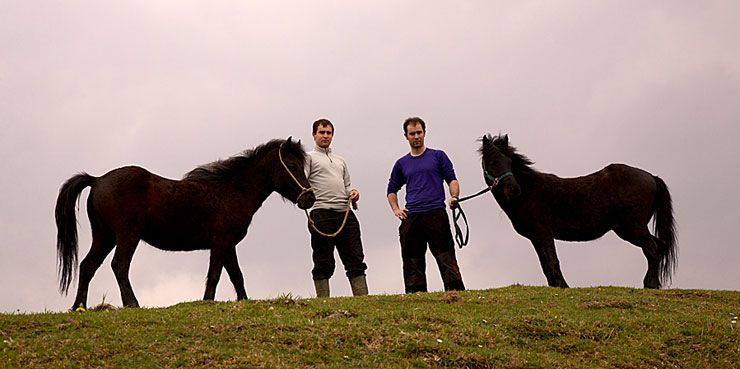
Pottoks bred by the ZAPE Society

Some claim the Pottok's origins derive from the horses on ancient cave paintings in the area and thus claim to descend from the Magdalenian horses of 14,000–7000 BC. Other link its origins to an influx of horses during the Bronze Age. However, neither of these theories has to date been scientifically verified.

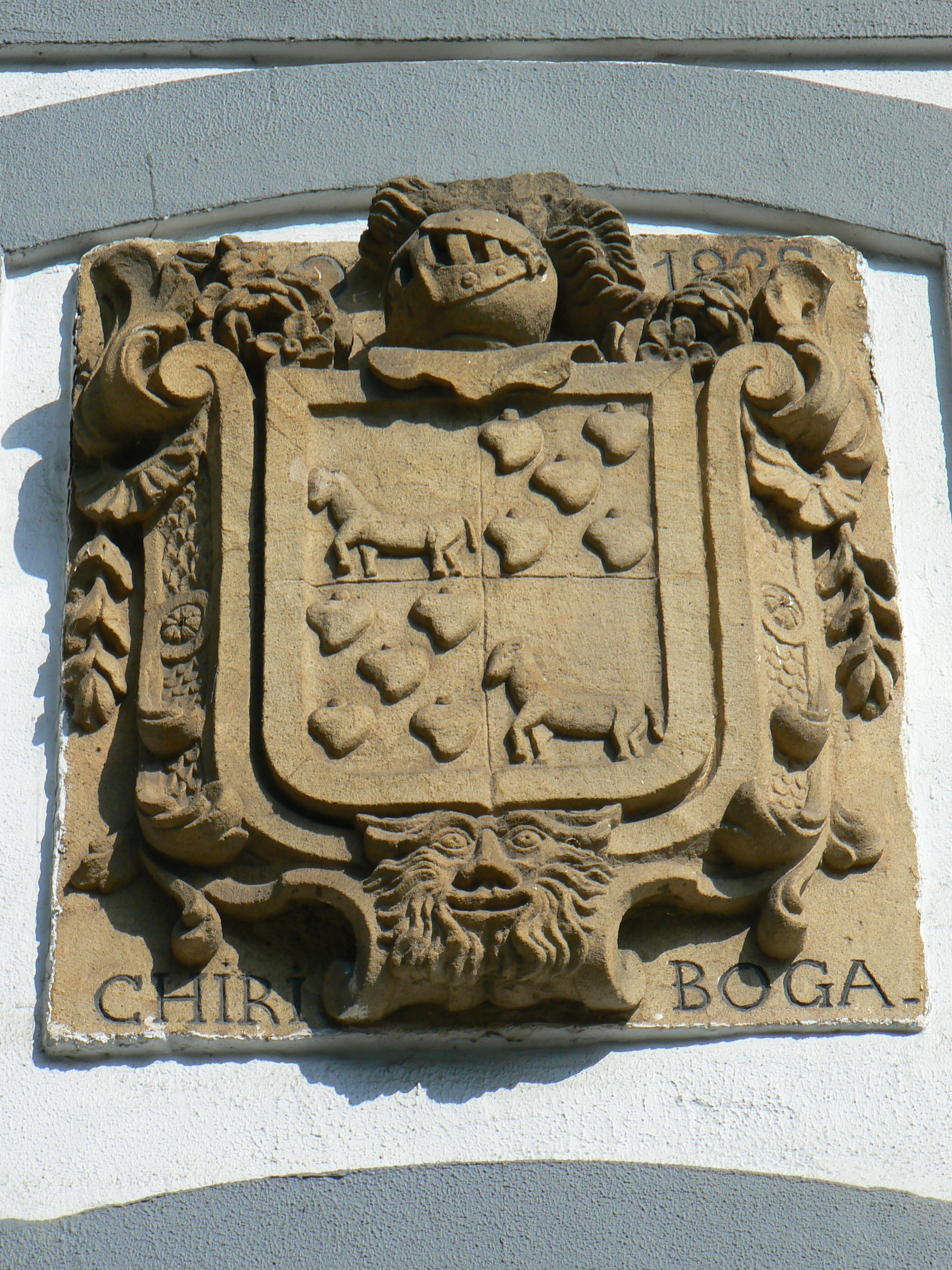
Pottoks on a coat of arms in Zestoa.

Genetic research by the University of the Basque Country's Genetics, Physical Anthropology and Animal Physiology department into various genetic markers amongst the 4 indigenous horse breeds in the Basque Country have examined their relationship to other horses. Based on microsatellite tests, of the four Basque horse breeds, the Pottok and the Basque Mountain Horse, are genetically the most distant from other breeds. The others, the Burguete horse and the Jaca Navarra (today considered meat breeds), less so. This variability in the Pottok and the Basque Mountain Horse appears to be related to the fact males range more widely and mate with more females in these feral or semi-feral herds.

Research into a known single-nucleotide polymorphism showed this non-native alternation is very rare in purebred Pottoks. Tests of mitochondrial DNA revealed Pottoks are most likely to crossbreed with the Basque Mountain Horses, less so with other breeds. Although some genetic markers of other European horse breeds were found, overall the genetic distance to the other European breeds is large. One marker previously only found in certain British breeds has also been found in Pottoks.

== Habitat ==
Its traditional range extends west as far as the Biscayan Encartaciones and east roughly as far as the Saint-Jean-le-Vieux area. A census carried out in 1970 found roughly 3500 purebred Pottoks north of the Pyrenees and approximately 2000 purebreds to the south, a considerable drop from historic populations, linked to an overall drop in the number of horses being bred and used commercially. Competition with sheep and more recently commercial forestry has also infringed on the Pottok's natural habitat.

The traditional core habitat are the mountains of Labourd and Navarre from about 1500 m upwards, generally on poor acidic soil and limestone formations.

== Characteristics ==
The Pottok measures 1.15 to 1.47 m (11.1 to 14.2 h) in height and weighs between 300 and 350 kg (650 and 750 lb). It has a large, square head, small ears, short neck and long back with short but slim legs and small, sturdy hooves.

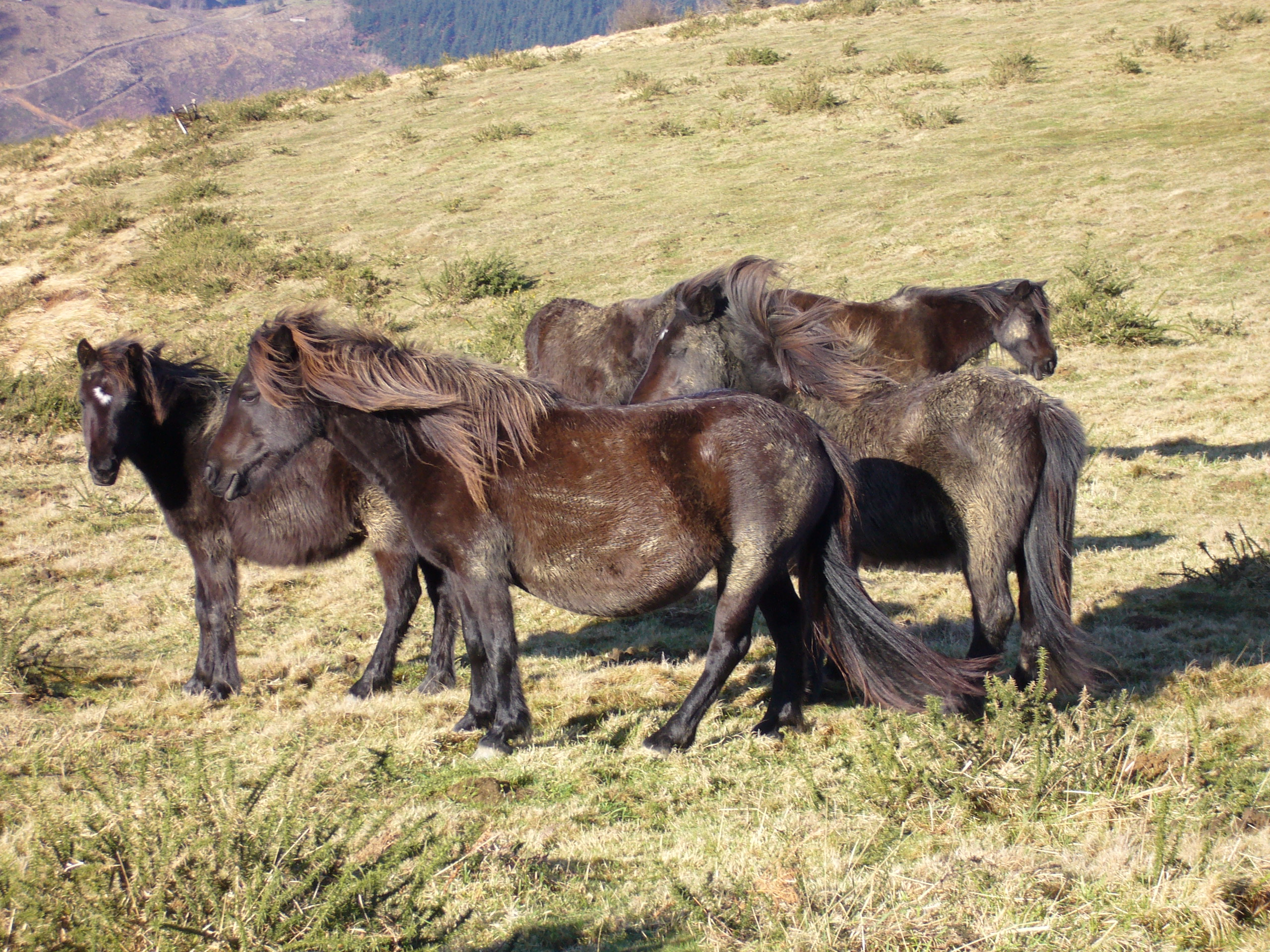
Pottoks with the heavy winter coat, (the borra)

The winter fur (borra) is one of the key characteristics of the Pottok and can reach up to 10 centimetres (3.9 in) in length on young horses. The archetypal coat colorations are in the bay range with no patterning, but today various shades of brown and black exist in Pottok herds. Pottok pintos first appeared in Biscay in the 1850s and have spread to parts of Navarre and Labourd since.

There are noticeable differences between mountain herds of Pottok and valley or flatland herds, with mountain horses generally being smaller. The official French breed standard distinguishes two types, the Pottok de Montagne or Mountain Pottok, with a height range of 1.15–1.32 m (11.1–13.0 h), and the larger Pottok de Prairie or Plains Pottok, which has a height range of 1.20–1.47 m (11.3–14.2 h).

The Government of Biscay carried out research into some 250 horses of the Pottok population of Biscay, both wild and stabled, in 1996–97. The census revealed that the majority of semi-feral Pottoks in Biscay live in the far northwest of the province, in the Encartaciones. These semi-feral herds are rounded up twice a year, once in March before birthing and once in October after weaning. The survey also concluded that the main characteristics of the Biscayan population were:

- black or blackish coats dominating (73%), followed by bays with (19%)
- height range 1.15 to 1.30 metres (11.1 to 12.3 h), average height 1.256 m (12.1 h)
- long, slim legs with black hooves
- large, heavy heads
- a heavy winter coat (the borra)

=== Behavior ===
Semi-feral Pottoks tend to be shy and live in small territorial herds or harems numbering between 10 and 30 mares. They are able to predict the weather conditions, moving into the valleys in anticipation of bad weather and upland when high pressure builds. During the autumn the herd breaks up into smaller groups of 5–10 horses and reunites in spring.

Foals mature quickly. Fillies become fertile at age 2, normally mate at age 3 and give birth at age 4, which is also the age of maturity for males. Foals, like those of other breeds, are born after 11 months during spring/early summer and are weaned after 6–7 months.

=== Cross-breeding ===
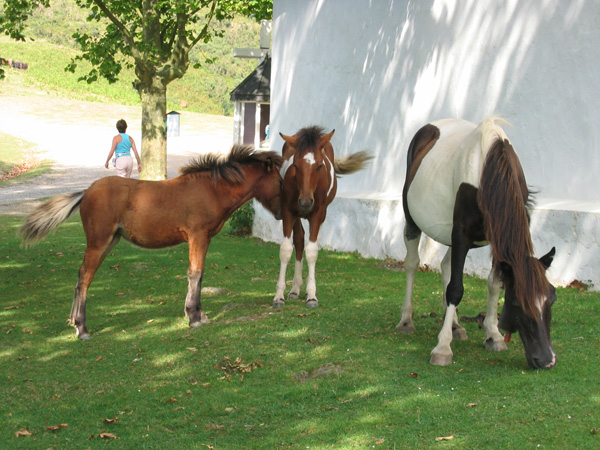
Cross-bred pottoks near Ainhoa.

Pottok numbers have been severely reduced by habitat loss and crossbreeding. In the 20th century piebald Pottoks were bred particularly for circus use. Stockier ponies for agricultural work were bred by crossbreeding with draught horses, also often with a large variety of coat colours.

They have also been bred with Iberian horses following guidelines of pony clubs, Arabian horses and Welsh ponies. This cross-breeding has left perhaps no more than 150 purebred mares north of the Pyrenees.

== Use ==
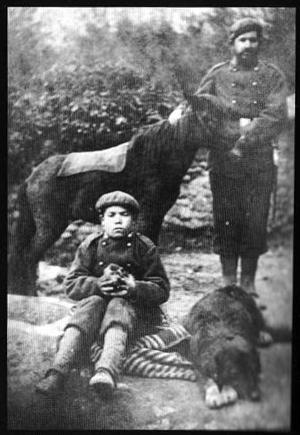
A Pottok used by the military in the Third Carlist War.

Their adaptation to mountain life and coloration made them ideal for use by smugglers in former times. From the 16th century onwards, they became popular as circus horses but also as pit ponies in France and Britain. Today, they are in demand as children's ponies because they adapt well to domestication.

== Conservation ==
Efforts are now being made to ensure the continued survival of purebred Pottoks. The Pottok was the first Basque horse breed to be included in the list of indigenous Basque breeds requiring conservation efforts in June 1995. Its status was classified as endangered.

Various reserves, for example in Bidarray in Lower Navarre or the ZAPE Society in the Aralar Range have been set up to protect the pony and its environment. There is much debate about how best to increase numbers – whether to focus only on the purebreds or to employ selective crossbreeding to build greater numbers of Pottok-like ponies.

Pottok are shown both at agricultural shows and town festivals:

- Espelette (Labourd) on the last Tuesday and Wednesday in January
- Markina-Xemein (Biscay) on the second Saturday in October at the Euskal Herriko Arrazen Erakusketa ("Basque Country Breeds' Show")
- Zumarraga (Gipuzkoa) on 13 December at the Santa Lutzi Feria

=== Studbooks ===
In the Northern Basque Country, two studbooks for the Pottok were set up in 1970. Crossbreds, covered under Book B, must have at least 50% Pottok blood, while Book A covers those of higher purity. Horses in Book A are divided into two types, the Mountain Pottok and the Plains Pottok. Only horses which live for a minimum of nine months in the year in semi-feral conditions in a harem containing mares, foals and stallions in the mountainous areas of la Rhune, Baïgorry, Ursuya and Artzamendi are considered Mountain Pottoks.

The breed standard specifies:

- robust, intelligent horse
- short, forward-facing ears
- short neck with a thick mane to the withers
- broad chest, long back
- short, sloping croup with a thick tail
- small, hard hooves
- height of 1.15–1.32 m (11.1–13.0 h) at the withers for the Mountain Pottok, and 1.20–1.47 m (11.3–14.2 h) for the Plains Pottok
- coat in black, bay or brown or chestnut. Colour may also include pinto but not gray

In the Southern Basque Country, the criteria specify:

- Type A: Purebreds with original coat types in black or bay with a height of 1.30 m (12.3 h) or less.
- Type B: Purebreds with any coat type up to 1.40 m (13.3 h) in height.
- Type C: Crossbreds with at least 50% Pottok blood up to 1.40 m (13.3 h) in height.

According to an atlas of Basque breeds compiled by IKT Nekazal Ikerketa eta Teknologia (Agricultural Research and Technology), there were 986 Pottoks in the Basque Autonomous Community in 1997; 40 in Álava, 849 in Biscay and 97 in Gipuzkoa.

In 2005 Switzerland was the only other country holding a studbook recognised by the French breed standard and regulations. This has been kept since 2000 by the Swiss Pottok Society, which since 2004 is a member of the Swiss Society for Ponies and Small Horses SVPK.

== See also ==
- List of French horse breeds
- List of Iberian horse breeds
