= Losino horse =

Spanish breed of horse

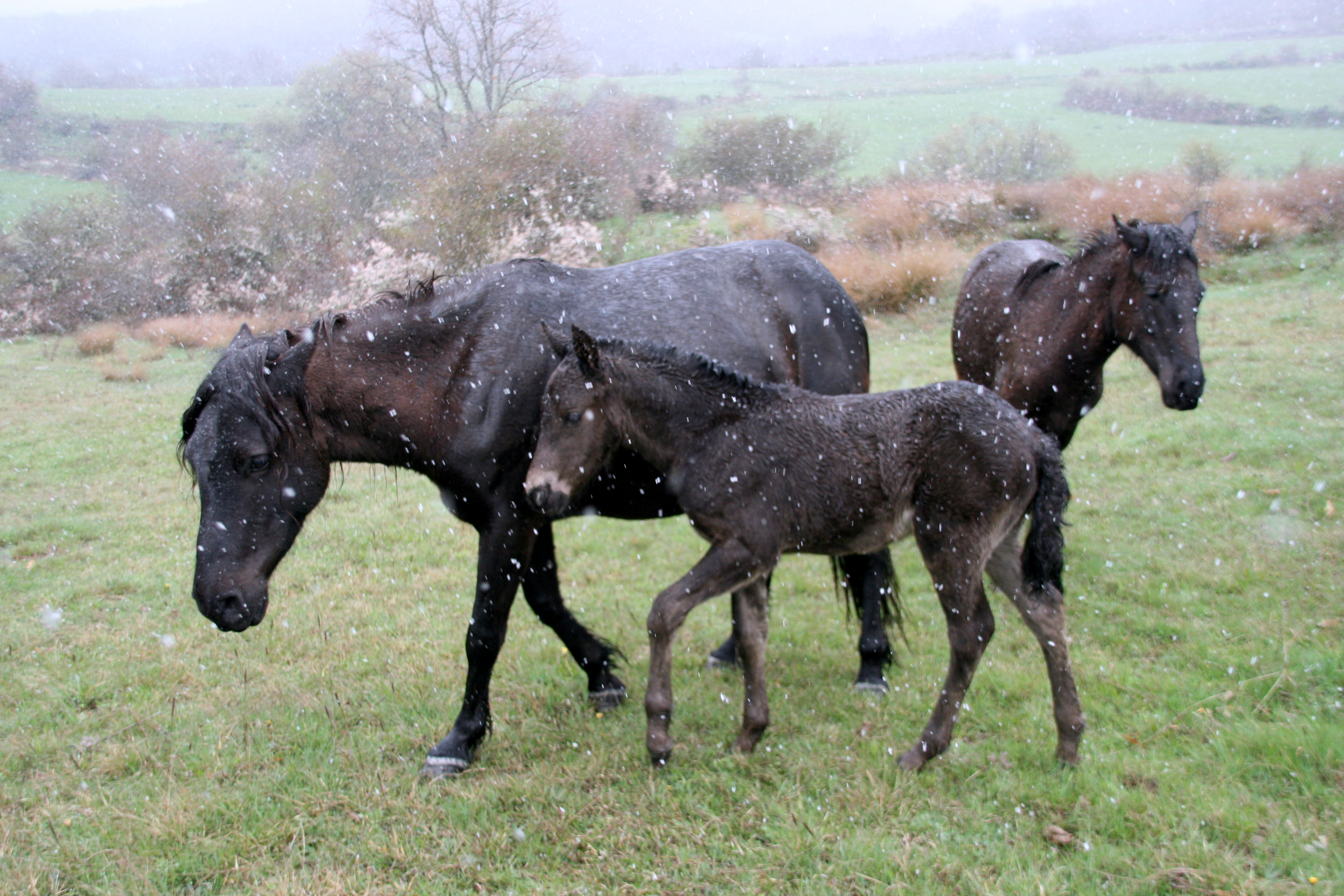
Herd of Losino horses

The Caballo Losino or Caballo de Raza Losina is a breed of horse from the Valle de Losa in the province of Burgos, in Castile and León in northern Spain. This breed is one of three breeds indigenous to the Iberia Peninsula. "They live at “an altitude from 600 to 1,450 m its breeding system develop under adverse conditions because of hard climate' (M. Valera)". It is listed in the Catálogo Official de Razas de Ganado de España in the group of autochthonous breeds in danger of extinction.

== See also ==
- Iberian horse
