= Agistment =

To take cattle for grazing in return for payment

Agistment originally referred specifically to the proceeds of pasturage in the king's forests. To agist is, in English law, to take cattle to graze, in exchange for payment (derived, via Anglo-Norman agister, from the Old French giste, gite, a "lying place").

== History ==
Agistment originally referred specifically to the proceeds of pasturage in the king's forests in England, but now means either:

1. the contract for taking in and feeding horses or cattle on pasture land, for the consideration of a periodic payment of money;
2. the profit derived from such pasturing.

Agistment involves a contract of bailment, and the bailee must take reasonable care of the animals entrusted to him; he is responsible for damages and injury which result from ordinary casualties, if it be proved that such might have been prevented by the exercise of great care. There is no lien on the cattle for the price of the agistment unless by express agreement. Under the Agricultural Holdings (England) Act 1883, agisted cattle cannot be distrained on for rent if there be other sufficient distress to be found, and if such other distress be not found, and the cattle be distrained, the owner may redeem them on paying the price of their agistment. The tithe of agistment or "tithe of cattle and other produce of grass lands" was formally abolished in Great Britain by the Act of Union 1707, on a motion submitted with a view to defeat that measure.

Agistment tithe continued in Ireland, but was opposed by landlords who had converted holdings from tillage to pasture, who secured a 1736 resolution of the House of Commons of Ireland opposing the levying of agistment tithe on "dry and barren cattle". Although this was not enshrined in statute law until just before the Acts of Union 1800, nevertheless it provided sufficient cover for widespread refusal to pay.

== Current usage ==
=== England (New Forest) ===
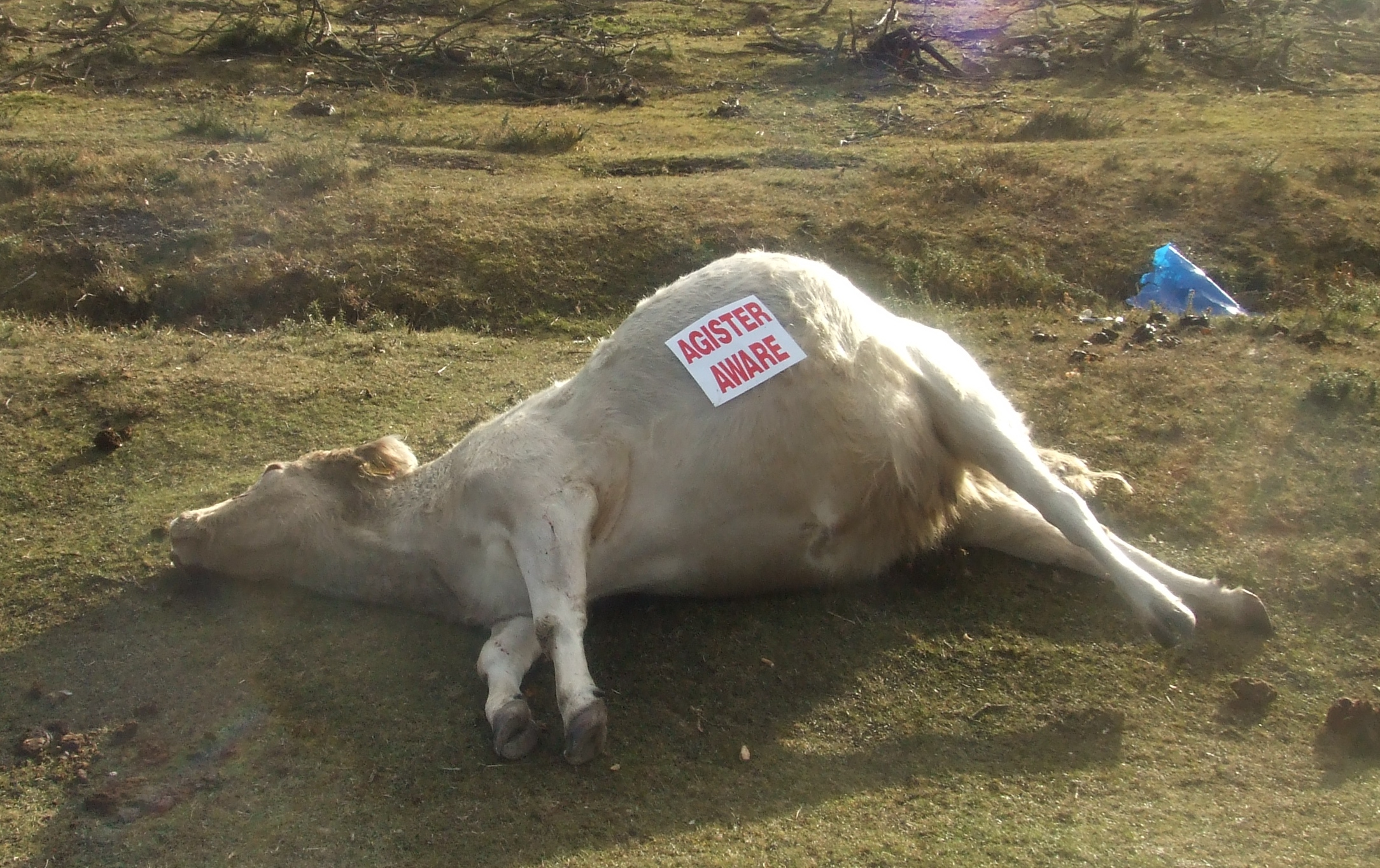
A dead cow in the New Forest. The sticker states "Agister Aware" because the agisters (not police) have the legal responsibility for commoners' animals in the forest.

In England, agisters were formerly the officers of the forest empowered to collect the agistment. They have been re-established in the New Forest to carry out the daily duties of administering the forest.

=== Australia and New Zealand ===
In Australia, agistment is commonly used during times of drought; livestock from a drought-affected property can be agisted on a drought-free property elsewhere in the country. The livestock may travel to the alternate pasture by truck or by travelling stock route. Agistment can also refer, in both Australia and New Zealand, to places such as farms, paddocks, or studs where the owners of horses can pay to have their animals looked after and allowed to graze ('full agistment') or where grazing only is offered ('part agistment').

=== United States and Canada ===
In the United States and Canada, the term agister is used in raw milk herdshare agreements to refer to the person hired to provide agistment services for owners of the herd animals. In the Western United States, agisters are landholders who offer pasturage services, or who seek to enforce agistment lien commitments. (Note: For example, in the State of Washington, agister is defined as "a farmer, ranchman, herder of cattle, livery and boarding stable keeper, veterinarian, or other person, to whom horses, mules, cattle, or sheep are entrusted for the purpose of feeding, herding, pasturing, training, caring for, or ranching" (Washington State Legislator 2016); as it is in Colorado (Colorado General Assembly 2005).)
