= Free-roaming horse management in North America =

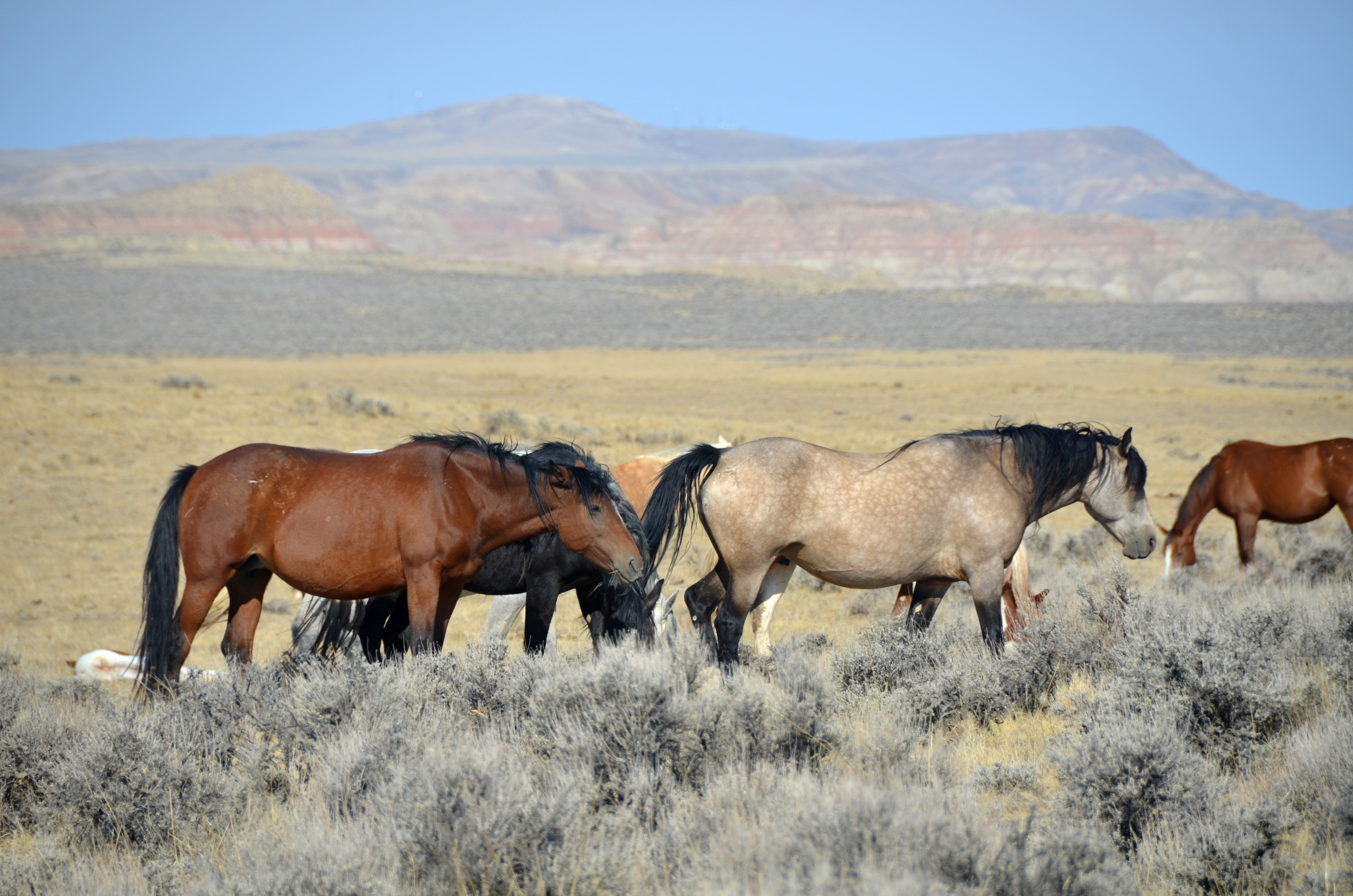
Mustangs in Wyoming

Management of free-roaming feral and semi-feral horses, (colloquially called "wild") on various public or tribal lands in North America is accomplished under the authority of law, either by the government of jurisdiction or efforts of private groups. In western Canada, management is a provincial matter, with several associations and societies helping to manage wild horses in British Columbia and Alberta. In Nova Scotia, and various locations in the United States, management is under the jurisdiction of various federal agencies. The largest population of free-roaming horses is found in the Western United States. Here, most of them are protected under the Wild and Free-Roaming Horses and Burros Act of 1971 (WFRH&BA), and their management is primarily undertaken by the Bureau of Land Management (BLM), but also by the U. S. Forest Service (USFS) (Note: Hereafter, references to "the agencies" refers only to the BLM and the USFS.)

Because free-roaming horses multiply quickly, able to increase their numbers by up to 20% per year, all North American herds are managed in some fashion in an attempt to keep the population size at a level deemed appropriate. In the western United States, implementation of the WFRH&BA has been controversial. The law requires that "appropriate management levels" (AML) be set and maintained on public rangelands and that excess horses be removed and offered for adoption. If no adoption demand exists, animals are to be humanely destroyed or sold "without limitation" which allows the horses to be sent to slaughter. Since continuous Congressional fiscal mandates have prevented euthanizing healthy animals or allowing sales that result in slaughter, and more animals are removed from the range than can be adopted or sold, excess horses are sent to short- and long-term holding facilities, which are at capacity. The population of free-roaming horses has increased significantly since 2005, triple the AML and at the numbers estimated to be on the range in 1930. In Missouri, a herd on public land is maintained at 50 by a nonprofit according to law signed by President Bill Clinton.

== History ==
While the horse evolved in North America, it became extinct between 8,000 and 10,000 years ago. There are multiple theories for this extinction, ranging from climate change to the arrival of humans.

Horses returned to the Americas beginning with Christopher Columbus in 1493. They also arrived on the mainland with Cortés in 1519. These were mostly Iberian horses now described as "Spanish type." The horse also became an important part of Native American culture. The horse population expanded rapidly. Additional European settlers brought a variety of horse types to the Americas, and from all sources, some animals eventually escaped human control and became feral.

Modern studies have identified a few modern herds, the Sulphur Springs herd, the Cerbat herd, the Pryor Mountains herd, and the Kiger herd as retaining the original phenotype of horses brought to New World by the Spanish.

== Eastern Seaboard ==
=== Sable Island ===
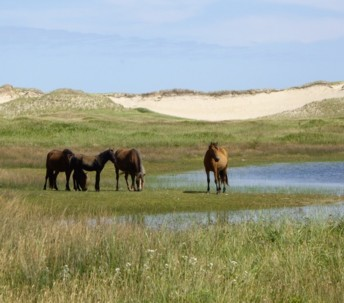
Sable Island Horses

Since 1960, the horses of Sable Island, unlike those in the rest of Canada, were protected under the Sable Island Regulations section of the Canadian Shipping Act. Following the designation of Sable Island as a National Park Reserve in December 2013, the horses are now fully protected by Parks Canada as wildlife under the Canada National Parks Act and the National Parks Wildlife Regulations. Parks Canada considers the Sable Island horses as 'naturalized wildlife’ and, as such, they are being managed as a taxon equal to other species living on the island.

=== United States ===
In the U.S., there are free-roaming herds on some of the barrier islands along the East Coast, notably Chincoteague Ponies, Banker horses and Cumberland Island horses. Most of these herds are managed by the National Park Service with assistance from various organizations. (Note: The Chincoteague Pony is managed by the NPS on the Maryland side of the island, while those on the Virginia side are managed by a private organization.) Their populations are held stable through use of contraception and removal and adoption.

== Western Canada ==
=== Management history ===
In terms of the population of free-roaming horses in historic times, and today, it is estimated to be less than 2,000 horses. Herds are found mainly on the Chilcotin Plateau of British Columbia, the Eastern Slopes of the Rocky Mountains in Alberta, and in Saskatchewan's Bronson Forest. There are approximately 800-1000 free-roaming horses in British Columbia. In 2014, the Alberta Government provided an official count of 880 for the horses of the Eastern Slopes of the Rockies and there are thought to be less than 100 horses in the Bronson Forest of Saskatchewan.

The free-roaming horses of Western Canada have been subjected to repeated attempts to reduce or eradicate the population. As early as 1896 the Government of British Columbia passed the Wild Horse Extermination Act that made it lawful for anyone licensed by the Government to shoot or otherwise destroy an unbranded stallion over the age of twenty months east of the Cascade Mountains. In the 40 years following implementation of the bounty system in B.C. in 1924, it is estimated that about 15,000 horses were killed. In a 1925 roundup in British Columbia, horses were driven into corrals and offered for sale at $5 a head; the thousands that were left over were shot. At the same time the Government offered a bounty of $2.50 for a pair of horse ears and a scalp.

In 1943, an export market developed in Europe and the United States and thousands of free-roaming horses were rounded up in Western Canada and shipped for both food consumption and domestic use. In Alberta, some roundups were done as far back as the 1950s, and a horse permit system was in effect from 1962 to 1972 when about 2000 horses were removed over the span of the ten years. In 1994, the entire herd of over 1,200 horses, which at the time was the largest population of free-roaming horses in Canada, was removed from the Suffield military base on the Alberta-Saskatchewan border. In 1993, Alberta introduced the Horse Capture Regulation under the Stray Animals Act which regulates the capture of wild horses, with between 25 and 35 horses being captured each year. However, during the 2011-12 capture season a record 216 horses were captured in Alberta. The Horse Capture Regulation expired on June 30, 2017, and was renewed with effectively no changes.

=== Provincial management ===
In Canada, except for Sable Island, there is no federal protection for free-roaming horses because Environment Canada considers horses to be introduced foreign animals, not native; therefore they do not qualify for protection under the Species at Risk Act. Instead, they are protected and managed through provincial jurisdiction. Feral horses are considered domestic livestock, not wildlife, under Alberta's Stray Animals Act. In British Columbia horses are controlled for range management purposes through the Grazing Act. In Saskatchewan the one remaining free-roaming herd is protected under The Protection of the Wild Ponies of the Bronson Forest Act (Saskatchewan)

=== Alberta Mountain Horses or "Wildies" of Alberta ===
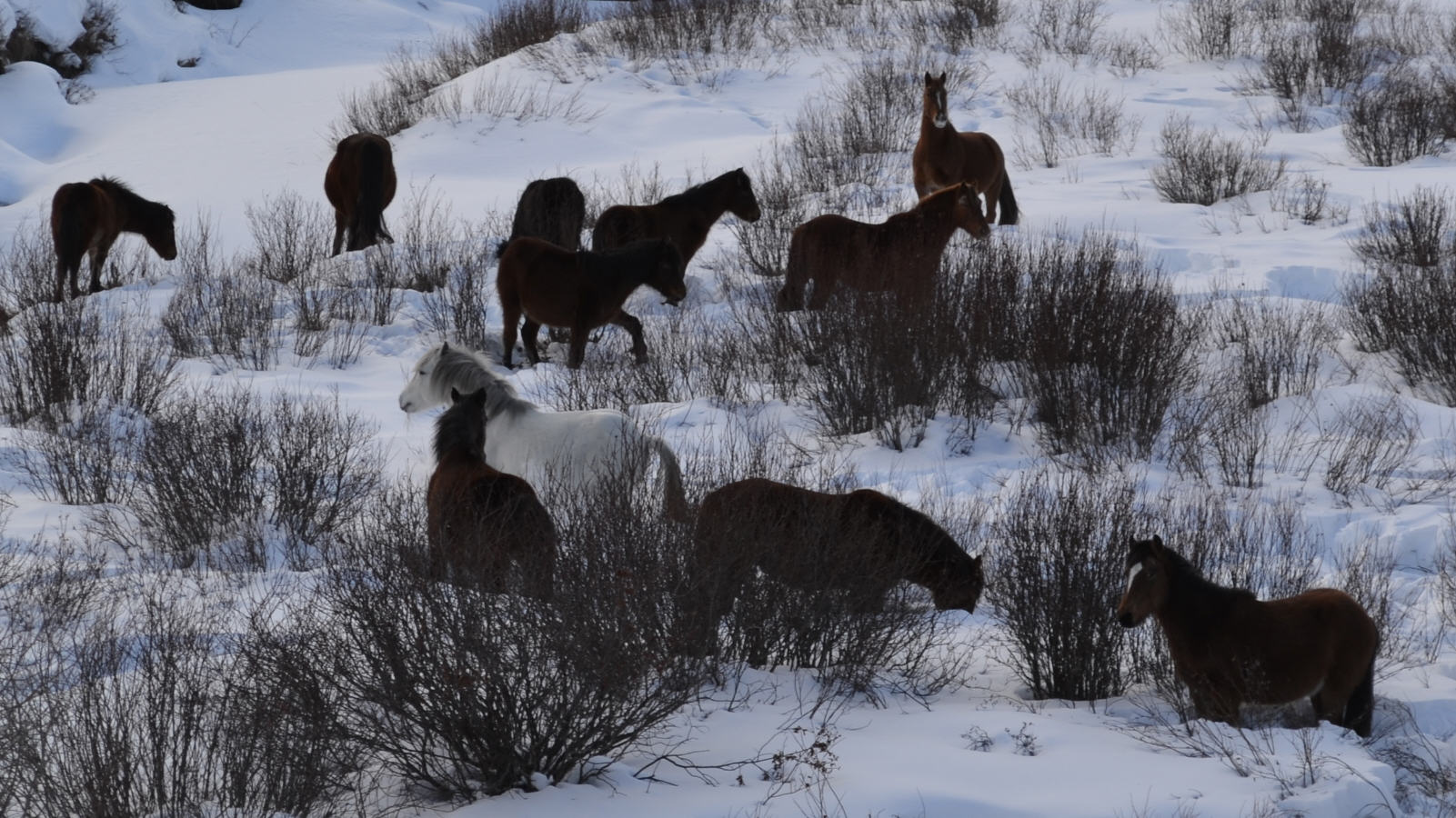
A small herd of "Wildies" in the foothills of Alberta in winter.

Free-roaming horses on the Eastern Slopes of the Rocky Mountains in Alberta are known locally as the Alberta Mountain Horse or "Wildie" (French: Cheval de Montagne de l'Alberta). On November 1, 2014, the non-profit advocacy group Wild Horses of Alberta Society (WHOAS) entered into a five-year agreement with the Alberta provincial government's Alberta Environment and Sustainable Resource Development (ESRD) that has now come to an end. This agreement authorized WHOAS to effectively and humanely manage the feral horse population in a 490-square-kilometre (190 mi^{2}) portion of the Sundre Equine Zone on the Eastern Slopes. By November 2017 WHOAS had completed the first three years of a selective contraception program using Zona Stat-H, a form of Porcine Zona Pellucida vaccine, or PZP. WHOAS has vaccinated approximately 82 mares by free-range field darting, some of these mares have received booster shots. With one shot a mare is 70-80% less likely to conceive for the 1st year, depending on the time of year in which she is vaccinated. This increases to 90% with the administration of a booster shot. The contraceptive effects wear off with the chance of conception increasing every year post-vaccination. WHOAS also runs a 20-acre horse rescue facility west of the Town of Sundre for those horses that run into trouble and have to be removed from the wild. The rescue facility will also take in orphaned foals to be raised, gentled and adopted out. In early 2018 the Alberta Government agreed to consider proposals from other not-for-profit groups to conduct PZP contraceptive programs in other areas of concern to maintain the population at manageable levels. If successful, these programs will replace Government captures and culls.

=== Wild ponies of the Bronson Forest, Saskatchewan ===
The last known herd of free-roaming horses in Saskatchewan inhabit the Bronson Forest in a remote area of northwestern Saskatchewan about 170 km north of Lloydminster near the Alberta-Saskatchewan border. In 2005, the wild ponies of the Bronson Forest numbered around 125 animals, but by 2009 many of the animals had been shot by a person or persons unknown and the herd had been reduced to 37 animals. The shootings brought public attention to the plight of the horses and in the fall 2009 legislative session, Tim McMillan, MLA for Lloydminster, Saskatchewan introduced a private members bill in the Legislative Assembly of Saskatchewan. Bill No. 606 received royal assent on December 3, 2009, and The Protection of the Wild Ponies of the Bronson Forest Act (Saskatchewan) came into immediate effect. The Act makes it an offense to "in any way willfully molest, interfere with, hurt, capture or kill any of the wild horses of the Bronson Forest". It was hoped that the passing of the Act would protect the wild ponies of the Bronson Forest so that they would continue to provide both a living and historical tourist attraction as well as highlight the Bronson Forest for the future and also recognizes the value and unique nature of the wild ponies of the Bronson Forest.

== Western United States ==
=== Introduced vs. reintroduced species ===
In making the determination to protect and manage free-roaming horses on some western Federal lands in 1971 (Note: Primarily BLM-administered lands, but also Forest Service and Department of Defense lands) Congress declared them to be "living symbols of the historic and pioneer spirit of the West (that) contribute to the diversity of life forms within the Nation". However, their ecological status in the western landscape is under considerable debate.

Some free-roaming horses advocates believe "they have a place on the Western landscape as a reintroduced native species." They argue that the horses have reinhabited an ecological niche vacated when they went extinct in North America 10,000 years ago, claiming that the 10,000 year gap is irrelevant. The National Academy of Science refutes that claim, stating that because of the large changes that have taken place in the North American environment in the past 10,000 years: "It cannot be argued that ecological voids dating back 10 millennia exist and that introduced forms are restoring some kind of earlier integrity."

Researchers Jay F. Kirkpatrick and Patricia M. Fazio have publicly advanced the argument that free-roaming horses should be legally classified as "wild" rather than "feral" asserting that, due to the presence of Equus ferus on the North American continent until the end of the Pleistocene era, horses were once a native species and that "the two key elements for defining an animal as a native species are where it originated and whether or not it coevolved with its habitat." Their position is that E. caballus did both in North America and thus "should enjoy protection as a form of native wildlife." Bob Garrot, director of the Fish and Wildlife Ecology and Management Program at Montana State University takes the opposite position, explaining, "(A)re they native? Are they the same critters that were there 10,000 years ago? Well, no they aren’t. Those horses are not the same horses that were here in the Pleistocene. The Western landscapes are not the same landscapes, neither are the plant and animal communities."

The Wildlife Society takes the position that free-roaming horses are an invasive species: "Since native North American horses went extinct, the western United States has become more arid and many of the horses’ natural predators, such as the American lion and saber-toothed cat, have also gone extinct, notably changing the ecosystem and ecological roles horses and burros play." According to the National Research Council, most free-roaming horse herds are outside of mountain lion and wolf habitat, the two modern species discussed as predators that could potentially control population growth. (Note: Wolves were already rare in the Great Basin, where the vast majority of mustangs are found, in historic times, and are not currently known to exist anywhere free-roaming horses are found. Black bears have also started to repopulate in the interior of Nevada, after having been extirpated 80 years ago.) A study conducted in 1987-1997 and published in 2001 that is cited in the National Research Council report, indicated that mountain lions could influence the population growth of herds found in mountain lion habitat, but only if there is also a large enough deer population, the lion's natural food source, to maintain a dense lion population. (Note: Mountain lions, like wolves, were historically rare in the Great Basin until deer, also historically rare, started moving in, possibly due because of the change of habitat caused by grazing livestock. The study also found that sorrel colored foals were killed at a higher rate than foals of other colors, indicating that the lions were targeting those that most resembled deer.)

According to a 2021 genetic study, ancient wild horses as well as the woolly mammoth were still present in the Yukon as recently as 5,700 years ago (mid-Holocene), This and related studies are used to support the thesis that modern horses are closely enough related to their North American ancestors to be treated as native.

=== Management history ===
Because free-roaming horse populations are not self-limiting, first non-government then government entities have taken on the task of managing their numbers. In 1930, there was an estimated population of between 50,000-150,000 feral horses in the western United States. They were almost completely confined to the remaining United States General Land Office (GLO) administered public lands and National Forest rangelands in the 11 contingent Western States. Some horses in Nevada originated from escaped Comstock Lode miners, other horses across the west escaped from various settlers or ranch horses that had been turned out to forage when not in use. Some were bred up for use as cavalry horses. A few populations retained centuries-old Spanish horse genetics. Most were managed as "mavericks" or "unbranded stock" under estray laws of the various states, and efforts to control their population were left to "mustangers" and local ranchers. Population control was hampered due to the difficulty of discerning which horses were truly feral and which were owned by ranchers, and in the process, sometimes branded horses were shot.

After decades of unregulated cattle, sheep and horse grazing, the range was overgrazed and deteriorating, which led to the passage of the 1934 Taylor Grazing Act. Its purpose was to "stop injury to the public lands by preventing over-grazing and soil deterioration; to provide for orderly use, improvement and development; to stabilize the livestock industry dependent upon the Public Range." The U.S. Grazing Service was established to administer the Act. The Grazing Service began establishing grazing fees and determined that the fee for grazing horses would be double that for cattle and sheep. As a result, ranchers, many of whom had gone broke during the Great Depression, frequently ignored the Act and simply released their unpermitted horses on the range. The Grazing Service and the US Forest Service began to pay contractors to assist in rounding up the free-roaming horses. Ranchers were given notice that a roundup would occur in a particular area and to remove their unpermitted horses. They would do so, but after the agencies had swept through and rounded up the horses still estray, the ranchers would return their horses to the range. As a result, most ranges were simply closed to horse grazing altogether. Any horses rounded up were either considered estrays or, if branded, in trespass. A rancher could reclaim his horses if he paid the back fees and fines, but in practice, many were relinquished. The contractors were allowed to take possession of the horses they captured, to dispose of as they saw fit. Tens of thousands of horses were removed from the range between 1934 and 1940. With the outbreak of World War II (WWII), the government efforts to remove the horses stopped.

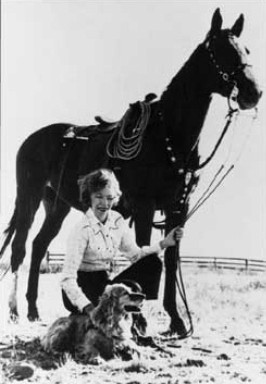
Velma Johnston, Wild Horse Annie

In 1946, the Grazing Service and the GLO were combined to create the Bureau of Land Management. In the same time period, a surplus of airplanes after WWII made aircraft widely available. The BLM would issue permits for airplane use, and mustangers used them and other motorized vehicles to capture the free roaming horses. In the 1950s, Velma B. Johnston, who became known as "Wild Horse Annie", led the push for federal protection of the horses and burros. By 1958, there were 14,810 to 29,620 free-roaming horses remaining in the 11 western states. (Note: McKnight's total numbers, 17,330-33,660, includes feral horse population estimates for Alaska, British Columbia and Alberta.) A year later, the first federal feral horse protection law was passed. This statute, popularly known as the "Wild Horse Annie Act", prohibited the use of aircraft or motor vehicles for hunting "wild, unbranded" horses or polluting water sources.

Passage of the Wild Horse Annie Act did not alleviate the concerns of advocates for free-roaming horses, who continued to lobby for federal rather than state control over these horses. At the same time, ownership of the free-roaming herds was contentious, and ranchers continued to use airplanes to gather them. Federal agencies also continued to try to eliminate horses from areas where they were perceived to be causing resource damage. In 1962, public pressure lead to the establishment of the Nevada Wild Horse Range, and in 1968, the Pryor Mountains Wild Horse Range was established. In 1969, the National Mustang Association, headquartered in Utah, persuaded Senator Frank Moss to introduce a bill (S. 2166) to protect the remaining mustangs of Spanish descent under the Endangered Species Preservation Act of 1966. Since the bill also called for the removal from public lands of all non-Spanish horses, it came under heavy opposition. Federal protection for all free-roaming horses was ultimately accomplished by the Wild and Free-Roaming Horses and Burros Act of 1971(WFRHBA). The bill specifically stated: "A person claiming ownership of a horse or burro on the public lands shall be entitled to recover it only if recovery is permissible under the branding and estray laws of the State in which the animal is found." This eventually alleviated the problem of horses being rounded up under the auspices of belonging to local ranchers, but right after the law passed, many ranchers claimed all the horses on their allotments, and set about rounding them up.

=== WFRH&BA management ===
The WFRH&BA called for management of free-roaming horses to be "designed to achieve and maintain a thriving natural ecological balance on the public lands." There are few non-anthropogenic means that limit their population growth and keep their numbers in balance. In 1972, the BLM approached Jay F. Kirkpatrick and John W. Turner and requested that they find a contraceptive that could be used to check the population growth of the free-roaming horses. Their efforts ultimately lead to the development of Porcine zona pellucida or PZP, a contraceptive developed from the ovaries of slaughtered pigs. However, the treatment wasn't ready for field trial until 1992. Soon after passage of the WFRH&BA, the agencies began rounding up horses by paying contractors to use saddle horses to chase them into traps for removal. In 1976, the BLM officially established an "Adopt-a-Horse" program, to place excess horses that had been removed, but had no authority to pass title to the adopters. (Note: Adoptions actually began in 1973.) By 1977, there were 60,000 animals on the range, the lower end of numbers estimated to be on the range in 1930. In 1976, the Federal Land Policy and Management Act (FLMPA) authorized the agencies to use helicopters to push the horses into traps. Unlike airplanes, helicopters can push horses along at a trot rather than a gallop, and the BLM asserts that the helicopter roundups are humane. The American Wild Horse Campaign claims that the helicopter roundups are "costly, cruel and inhumane."

In 1978, the WFRH&BA was amended in the Public Rangelands Improvement Act requiring the agencies to set "Appropriate Management Levels" (AML) and remove excess wild horses. AMLs for each Herd Management Area began to be established through the Land Use Planning Process. The FLPMA required the BLM to manage public lands under the principles of "multiple use and sustained yield," thus livestock grazing and wildlife habitat are managed along with free-roaming horses and burros. When the BLM develops land use plans, its official position is that it "will consider wild horses and burros in a manner similar to the way it treats other resource values (e.g., cultural, historic, wildlife, and scenic, as distinguished from authorized commercial land uses, such as livestock grazing or timber harvesting)." As of 2018, the current total maximum AML for both horses and burros is 26,715, down from 30,158 in 1986. Advocates for protection of free-ranging horses argued that the AML was set too low, particularly in contrast to the forage allocated for cattle. Congress has not suggested that AML be raised, but instead has directed the BLM to look into more effective forms of population control.

From 1971 through 2001, the BLM removed 193,000 horses and burros from the federal rangelands, (Note: These numbers are derived from subtracting the total numbers from 2001 until 2007, provided on page 7 of the 2008 GAO report from the total numbers from 1971 until 2007 provided on page 3 of the same report.) but still could not maintain the populations at AML. The 1978 amendment had provided guidelines for adopting out horses. authorizing passing title to adopters and the BLM managed to place 189,300 (Note: Numbers are derived from subtracting the total numbers from 2001 until 2007, provided on page 7 of the 2008 GAO report from the total numbers from 1971 until 2007 provided on page 3 of the same report. However, the BLM asserts that it had adopted out 230,000 horses and burros from 1971 until 2015, whereas the 2008 GAO report stated that from 1971 until 2007 235,700 animals had been adopted out. The GAO number appears to be too high, since it also states that, in 2001, 9,807 animals were in holding facilities, making the total of animals adopted out plus the total being held about 6000 animals more than captured.) of the 193,000 animals in private care. But, in addition to requiring the BLM to set AMLs, the 1978 amendment required that, "excess wild free roaming horses and burros for which an adoption demand by qualified individuals does not exist to be destroyed in the most humane and cost efficient manner possible." BLM instead initiated a self-imposed moratorium on destroying excess unadoptable animals in 1982, instead, starting in 1984, placing 20,000 horses with large-scale adopters who took a minimum of 100 horses each. Non-compliance for approving and monitoring those adoptions caused inhumane treatment and death to hundreds of the horses and many adopters sold thousands of them to slaughterhouses after gaining title. BLM terminated the large scale program in 1988 after negative publicity and pressure from the Congress and from 1988 until 2004, Congress prevented the Bureau from destroying excess healthy unadopted animals by stating, in the Department of the Interior's annual appropriations acts, that "appropriations herein shall not be available for the destruction of healthy unadopted wild horses and burros in the care of the Bureau of Land Management or its contractors." As an alternative, since 1988, the BLM began sending excess horses to "sanctuaries". The first sanctuary was the "Institute of Range and the American Mustang" in the Black Hills, which the BLM paid to maintain 1,650 horses. In 1989, Congress directed the BLM to establish more sanctuaries. Sanctuaries were meant to "encourage tourism and economic development in the area as well as public understanding of BLM'S wild horse program" but as time went on the concept evolved into "long term holding." The long term holding facilities are generally located in the Midwest where conditions are more conducive to the welfare of the horses than the desert ranges, and the life-span of the horses is greatly increased than in the wild.

On November 17, 2008, at a public meeting held by the BLM to discuss the fate of horses in long-term holding, Madeleine Pickens announced her plans to buy a one million acre (4,000 km^{2}) tract at an undisclosed location "in the West" and establish a sanctuary for the horses, which she would adopt and maintain at private expense. Shortly thereafter she stated that the recession forced many of the donors she hoped would help her pay for the venture backed out, and she requested the BLM pay her a yearly stipend of $500 per horse to maintain the horses. The BLM responded that it was not possible to enter into the contract she requested. The BLM did put out invitations for Pickens and others who wished to provide lands to maintain horses for the BLM in "Eco_Sanctuaries" to submit proposals for evaluation. Pickens submitted a proposal to maintain horses on private and public lands in Nevada, that the BLM agreed to evaluate but evaluation of the proposal stalled after scoping found issues that have yet to resolved. There are currently two sanctuaries in Wyoming maintaining horses for the BLM on private lands.

In 2001, BLM committed to reducing the population to AML by 2005 by increasing the number of animals removed each year. From 2001 until 2008, over 74,000 animals were removed, but with adoption rates having dropped 36% since the 1990s, only 46,400 were adopted out. In 2004, Congress approved an amendment to the WFRH&BA, called the "Burns Amendment" or "Burns Rider," (Note: The "Burns Amendment" is called an amendment because it amended the WFRH&BA, but it was passed as a "rider" to the 2005 Interior Appropriations Act.) which repealed the policy of the preceding 22 years by not including the prohibition against euthanizing healthy horses in the 2005 Interior Appropriations Act and allowed excess wild horses to be sold without limitation if not adopted. (Note: The Burns Amendment also removed from the WFRH&BA the statement: "that no wild free-roaming horse or burro or its remains may be sold or transferred for consideration for processing into commercial products.") This resulted in public outcry. From fiscal year 2006 through 2009—though there was no restriction on selling or euthanizing excess horses—BLM chose not to exercise either option due to "concerns over public and Congressional reaction to the large-scale slaughter of thousands of healthy horses." (Note: In 2008, the BLM considered complying with the mandate to euthanize excess horses.) By FY 2010, implementation of the Burns Amendment was further curtailed by the "Rahall Rider," which reinserted into Interior Appropriations the prohibition on money being spent to euthanize healthy horses, while also prohibiting funds from being used to sell horses to parties’ intent on sending them to slaughter. (Note: The Rahall Amendment stated: "Appropriations made herein shall not be available for the destruction of healthy, wild unadopted horses and burros in the care of the Bureau of Land Management or its contractor's or for the sale of wild horses and burros that results in their destruction for processing into commercial products." See page 5 of the bill.) Though not directly repealing the Burns Amendment, the Rahall Rider has been added to every appropriations bill from FY 2010 through FY 2018. To comply with these annual restrictions, the BLM purchase contract has a statement prohibiting purchasers from processing horses into commercial products.

As a result, the BLM now maintains excess horses in long- and short-term holding facilities. More animals are removed from the range than can be adopted or sold. As a result, by June 2008, 30,088 excess animals were held in captivity, up from 9,807 in 2001. That same year, the BLM predicted that the "number of wild horses on the range would reach about 50,000, or about 80 percent over AML, by 2012." In February 2007, BLM estimated it was 1,000 animals over AML, the closest it had ever been, but researchers had found that BLM's census methods "consistently undercounted" them. After 2008, adoption numbers began to drop. By 2014, just over 2000 animals a year were being adopted. The BLM continued removing large numbers of horses, but by 2013, had no more space in long-term or short term holding facilities for the excess, and removal rates dropped from 8,255 in 2012 to 1,857 in 2014. In a 2014 report by the House Appropriations Committee it was stated "The horse and burro management program in its current state is unsustainable and the Committee cannot afford to perpetuate the situation for much longer."

In both the 2015 and 2016 budgets the Rahall language to prevent euthanizing and selling without limitation excess horses and to continue to allow funds to be used for long term holding. (Note: In the appropriation committee report the Senate stated: "Within the amount provided for wild horse and burro management, the Bureau should continue to implement reforms based on the findings and recommendations outlined in the National Academy of Sciences June 2013 report. The Committee remains concerned about the well-being of animals on the range due to drought conditions and population trends, as well as about the resulting impacts to rangeland and riparian areas. The Bureau is directed to achieve appropriate management levels in Herd Management Areas, with priority given to those areas that overlap priority sage-grouse habitat.") However, the amount allocated did not allow the BLM to conduct sufficient gathers to achieve the Senate's directive, and on September 9, 2016, the BLM Wild Horse Resource Advisory Board (RAC) recommended the BLM be allowed to start euthanizing or selling without limitation horses to "alleviate space in the holding facilities to save the BLM more money in which they could use for gathers and start relieving some of these impacted rangelands." In response to the RAC recommendation, the Humane Society of the United States (HSUS) refuted the idea that the BLM should remove horses to achieve AML and instead implement fertility control.

In January 2017, Freedom Caucus member Representative Morgan Griffith from Virginia wanted to implement the Holman Rule, that would slash individual pay of government workers to $1, citing the $80 million cost of administering the free-roaming horse program as one among many examples of misspent government resources. Instead of implementing the RAC recommendation the Rahall language was again included in the budget bill which finally passed on May 5, 2017, to manage spending until the end of the FY2017, but the increased Congressional attention on the costs of the program, The explanatory statement accompanying the budget reflected increased Congressional attention on the costs of the program, and required the BLM to prepare and submit: "a plan to achieve long-term sustainable populations on the range in a humane manner" giving the agency 180 days, until early November, to submit the plan (hereafter referred to as the "report").

On May 23, 2017, President Donald Trump released the FY2018 Interior Budget in Brief which, while reducing the free-roaming horse budget by ten million dollars, "proposes to give BLM the tools it needs to manage this program in a more cost-effective manner, including the ability to conduct sales without limitation. The budget proposed to eliminate appropriations language restricting BLM from using all of the management options authorized in the Wild Free-Roaming Horse and Burro Act. The remainder of the funding decrease would be achieved by reducing gathers, reducing birth control treatments, and other activities deemed inconsistent with prudent management of the program."

Despite Senate prodding on November 20, 2017, stating: "The Committee looks forward to the release of the report...and is hopeful that it will contain a range of humane and politically viable options that can collectively be implemented to drastically reduce on-range populations and a variety of methods to limit unsustainable on-range reproduction", the BLM failed to submit the report, so Congress declined to remove the Rahall language from the 2018 budget, stating: "Until the Department provides a comprehensive plan and any corresponding legislative proposals to the appropriate authorizing committees, the Committees will maintain the existing prohibitions and reduce the resources available for the program" and gave the BLM until April 22, 2018, to submit the report. (Note: The first (May 2017) Congressional request for the report had asked the BLM to "review all serious proposals from non-governmental organizations (NGOs)... to achieve long-term sustainable populations on the range... " The second and third requests (November 2017 and March 2018) removed the requirement of evaluating and presenting NGO proposals, but Attachment 3 of the report did discuss NGO proposals and explained why they weren't viable) On April 26, 2017, the BLM submitted the report as required, providing several options for Congress to consider, including fertility control as recommended by the HSUS, mostly consisting of permanent sterilization. In the meantime, the Department of Interior budget request for fiscal year 2019 had again requested that the restrictions of the Rahall amendment not be included in the 2019 budget

The report stated that at the end of 2017, there was an estimated 83,000 wild horses and burros, or three times AML, on public lands. Congress has yet to act on the information.

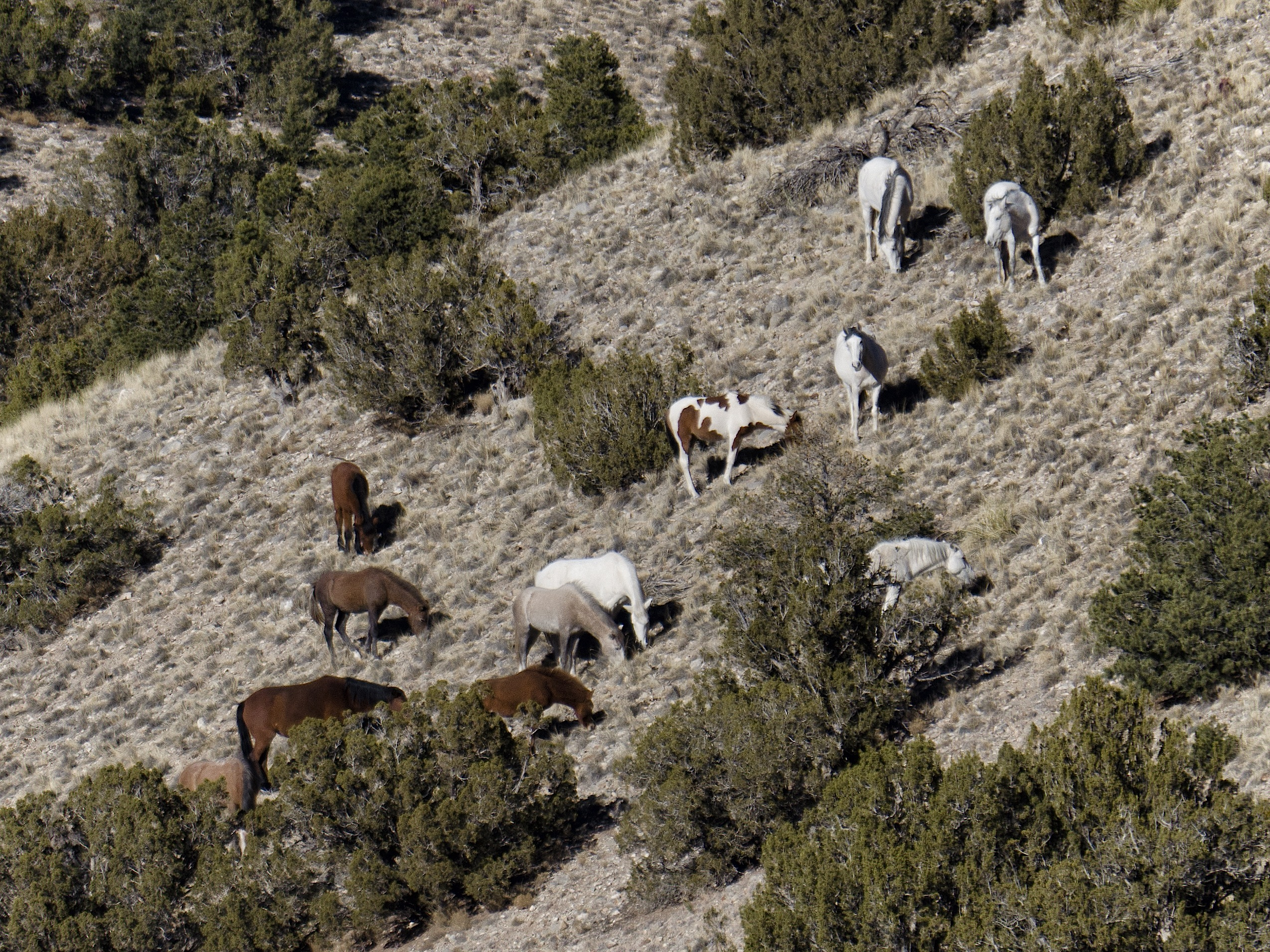
Horses of Placitas

Horses captured under the authority of the WFRH&BA are freeze branded on the left side of the neck by the BLM, using the International Alpha Angle System, a system of angles and alpha-symbols that cannot be altered. The brands begin with a symbol indicating the registering organization, in this case the U.S. Government, then two stacked figures indicating the individual horse's date of birth, then the individual registration number. Mustangs kept in sanctuaries are also marked on the left hip with four inch-high Arabic numerals that are also the last four digits of the freeze brand on the neck.

==== Other Western US herds ====
Since the WFRH&BA applies only to unclaimed horses that were free roaming on lands managed by the BLM and USFS at the time of passage of the Act, there are a number of other free-roaming horse herds in the west, including:

- Placitas Herd (New Mexico)
- Virginia Range Herd (Nevada)
- Sheldon Herd (Nevada)
- Theodore Roosevelt National Park Herd (North Dakota)
- Salt River Herd (Arizona)
- Herds on Indian Reservations such as those on the Pyramid Lake Paiute, the Uintah and Ouray Ute and the Ute Mountain Ute Reservations. However, horses from the Ute Mountain Reservation are migrating into the Mesa Verde National Park causing a management dilemma for the Park. Herds of free roaming horses on the Navajo Reservation have multiplied to the point that the tribe is considering multiple options, including roundups, adoption, sterilization, sales, and even hunting.

=== Horses vs. wildlife and livestock on public lands ===
Much of the debate as to whether free-roaming horses are an Introduced vs. Reintroduced species is in the context of the priority of use of the resources of public lands the horses should have in relation to wildlife and livestock. The need for more sustainable management is generally agreed upon because of the degradation of the western range in areas inhabited by free-roaming horses, but what and how management occurs is hotly debated. Advocates for free-roaming horses suggest reducing the numbers of sheep and cattle permitted to graze on public lands to allocate more resources for horses, ranching interests hold the opposite, wishing to see horse numbers maintained at AML, while wildlife advocates want to prioritize native species over both domestic livestock and free-roaming horses.

Cattle and sheep ranchers and others who support the position of the livestock industry tend to favor a lower priority of feral horses than private livestock for use of public land, and argue that the horses degrade the public rangelands. The numbers of cows that can graze the range decreases as the number of horses increases.

The debate as to how much horses compete with cows for forage is multifaceted. Ruminates such as cattle and sheep, with their multi-chambered stomachs, can extract more energy from their feed, and thus require less, but more high quality forage, such as leaves and forbs. Horses are evolutionarily adapted to survive in an ecological niche dominated by "fibrous herbage" (i.e. low quality grass forage) due to being "hindgut fermenters", meaning that they digest nutrients by means of the cecum. Thus, horses are adapted to inhabit an ecological niche characterized by poor quality vegetation. While this means that they extract less energy from a given amount of forage, it also means that they can digest food faster and make up the difference in efficiency by increasing their consumption rate, obtaining adequate nutrition from lower quality forage than can ruminants. Because of their consumption rate, while the BLM rates horses by animal unit (AUM) to eat the same amount of forage as a cow-calf pair, 1.0, some studies of horse grazing patterns indicate that horses probably consume forage at a rate closer to 1.5 AUM. Horses can, however, cover vast distances to find water and the high fibrous grasses they thrive on; they may range nine times as far from water sources as cattle, traveling as much as 55 kilometres (34 mi) to 80 kilometres (50 mi) from a water source. This means they can reach grazing land that cattle cannot access.

Unlike cows, horse incisors allow them to graze plants much closer to the ground increasing recovery time for the plant. Modern rangeland management also recommends removing all livestock (Note: "livestock" in this context includes sheep, cattle and horses.) during the growing season to maximize recovery of the forage. Allowing livestock, including horses, to graze year-round not only degrades the range, but negatively impacts the wildlife that shares the same area. Another concern is that Feral horses compete for water with other wildlife species, and often are dominant over some, such as the pronghorn, which in drought conditions causes stress that impacts the survival.

== See also ==
- List of Bureau of Land Management Herd Management Areas
- Mustang Heritage Foundation

== Notes ==
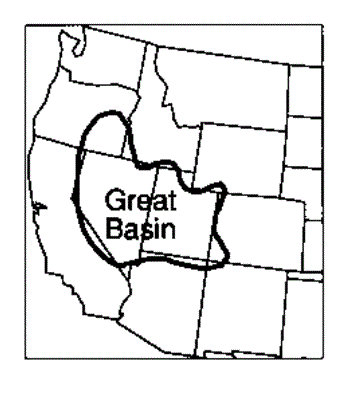
Map from the 1991 National Research Council Report depicting the Great Basin in reference to the feral horses in the Western U.S.

== Sources ==
- Alison, Robert (October 15, 2005). "Last roundup feared for Canada's wild horses; Only a handful of the animals left in Canada, U.S. Senate moves to protect dwindling herds" (PDF). Toronto Star. Archived from the original (PDF) on September 27, 2015 – via Canadian Horse Defense Coalition website.
- Amaral, Anthony (1977). Mustang: Life and Legends of Nevada's Wild Horses. Reno: University of Nevada Press. ISBN 9780874170467.
- Budiansky, Stephen (1997). The nature of horses : exploring equine evolution, intelligence, and behavior. New York: Free Press. ISBN 9780684827681.
- Duffus III, James (1990). Rangeland Management: Improvements Needed in Federal Wild Horse Program (PDF) (Report). Government Accountability Office.
- De Steiguer, J.Edward (2011). Wild Horses of the West: History and Politics of America's Mustangs. Tucson: University of Arizona Press. ISBN 9780816528264.
- Findley, Tim (2011). "Special Report Mustang Legends and Myths. Faith, Hope and Charity" (PDF). Range Magazine.
- Mason, Chris. "How to rescue a wild horse: A comparison of American and Canadian policies." Archived October 6, 2012, at the Wayback Machine Canadian Geographic. Mar 2005: n. page. March 1, 2013.
- National Research Council (2013). Using Science to Improve the BLM Wild Horse and Burro Program: A Way Forward (Report). Washington D.C.: The National Academies Press. doi:10.17226/13511. ISBN 978-0-309-26494-5.
- National Research Council (1991). Wild Horse Populations: Field Studies in Genetics and Fertility: Report to the Bureau of Land Management, U.S. Department of the Interior (Report). Washington D.C.: The National Academies Press. doi:10.17226/18466. ISBN 978-0-309-29162-0.
- Nazzaro, Robin N. (October 2008). Effective Long-Term Options Needed to Manage Unadoptable Wild Horses (PDF) (Report). Government Accountability Office.
- Strategic Relations Inc. (April 26, 2013). Alberta Environment and Sustainable Resource Development. Alberta's Feral Horses: Managing Populations (PDF). Alberta Environment and Parks (Report). Archived from the original (PDF) on September 27, 2015.
- The Taylor Grazing Act, 1934-1984, 50 Years of Progress. Boise: U. S. Dept. of Interior, Bureau of Land Management Idaho State Office. 1984.
