= Pardis Animal Shelter =

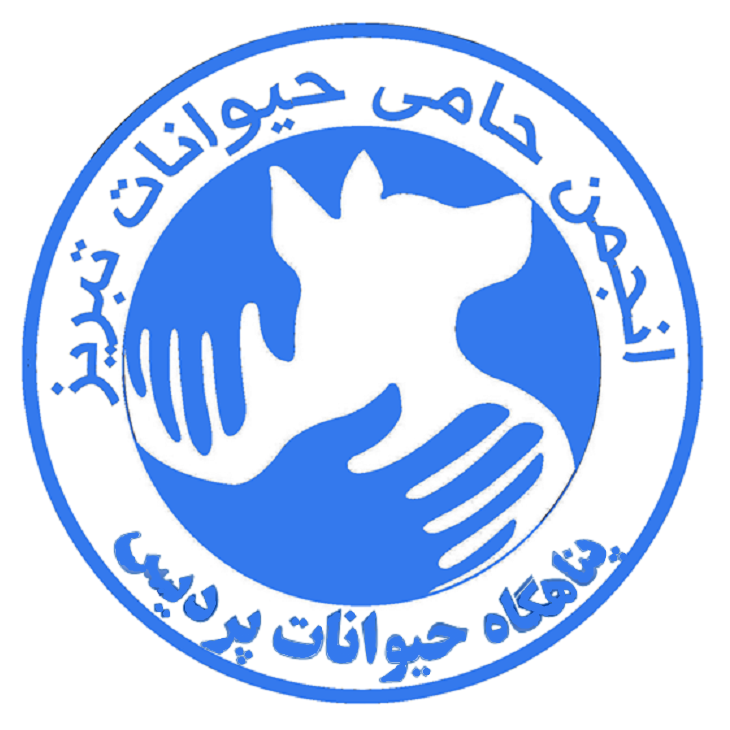
- Formation: 2012; 14 years ago
- Founder: Jila Pourirani
- Purpose: Prevention of Cruelty to Animals
- Location: Tabriz, Iran
- Website: pardisshelter.com

Pardis Animal Shelter (Persian: پناهگاه حیوانات پردیس) is a no-kill animal shelter, a spay/neuter clinic, and a public animal hospital located near Tabriz, Iran. It is affiliated with "Tabriz Society for the Prevention of Cruelty to Animals" which is a volunteer nonprofit organization based in Tabriz, devoted to pet adoption and animal rescue. Pardis Shelter was founded by Jila Pourirani in 2012, after a massive cull that nearly 400 dogs were shot dead in Tabriz. Pardis Shelter has a clinic, 11 shelters, three niches and shaded areas. 1300 animals of different kinds including dogs, cats, foxes, horses and birds such as eagle, owl and vultures are being treated and sheltered in this center.

== Combating animal cruelty ==
Killing stray animals was outlawed by a ratification of a by-law through the Governor's office and Public Attorney's office of Tabriz in July 2014. Any stray dogs or cats encountered by city officials must now be transferred to this shelter. Dogs are quarantined for a while upon entering the shelter, washed, removed parasites, vaccinated and sterilized. An average of 700 stray animals per year are sterilized in this shelter. Services such as surgery, transportation of animals and animal rescue are also provided by this center.

== Current crisis ==
Some people have legally complained about the unpleasant odor of the animal shelter while it is not close to residential areas. Therefore, the animal shelter has to be moved to a new location and a new shelter has to be built, while they already had financial difficulties with their day-to-day costs. The freezing winter season of Tabriz region is starting soon and most of those animals can only make it through this winter if they are sheltered in an indoor place.
