= Mustang Classic =

Annual horse competition in Kentucky, US

- Sanctioning body: Mustang Champions
- Location: Rolex Stadium, Kentucky Horse Park, Lexington, KY, USA
- Held: Annually
- Length: 3 days
- Sponsors: Practical Horseman
- Inaugurated: 2024
- Breeds shown: Mustang
- Total purse: US$125,000
- Number of entries: 61
- Slogan: Be a hero to an American Mustang.
- Website: mustangclassic2024.com

The Mustang Champions Classic, or simply the Mustang Classic, held at the Kentucky Horse Park, is an eventing competition that showcases the American Mustang. It is being held annually in September by the Mustang Champions organization, in conjunction with the U.S. Bureau of Land Management. It is a sister event to the Mustang Challenge held in Las Vegas during the summer, and both are intended to complement the Extreme Mustang Makeover events.

Competition includes dressage, show jumping, and arena cross country, as well as working equitation. The top 10 competitors compete in the finals for prize money. Event rules are based on those provided by the United States Equestrian Federation, the United States Eventing Association, the USA Working Equitation organization.

The event was created "to showcase the skill and adaptability of the American mustang and the talented trainers that work with them in the English discipline". The competition is open to competitors who have adopted or purchased Mustangs that were originally part of the BLM adoption programs and have previously competed in appropriate equestrian competitions.

The 2024 event was held September 13–15. The 2025 event is scheduled for September 4–6.

== History ==
The Wild Horse and Burro Program was created in 1971 by the Bureau of Land Management, part of the United States Department of the Interior. Its purpose was to manage the herds of feral horses and donkeys roaming lands in the Western US. This involves controlling the sizes of the herds so that they do not tax the natural resources too much and endanger themselves or other animals. Ideally the BLM tries to have the mustangs and burros that it removes from the wild adopted by individuals or organizations. This has become more challenging as the years have passed.

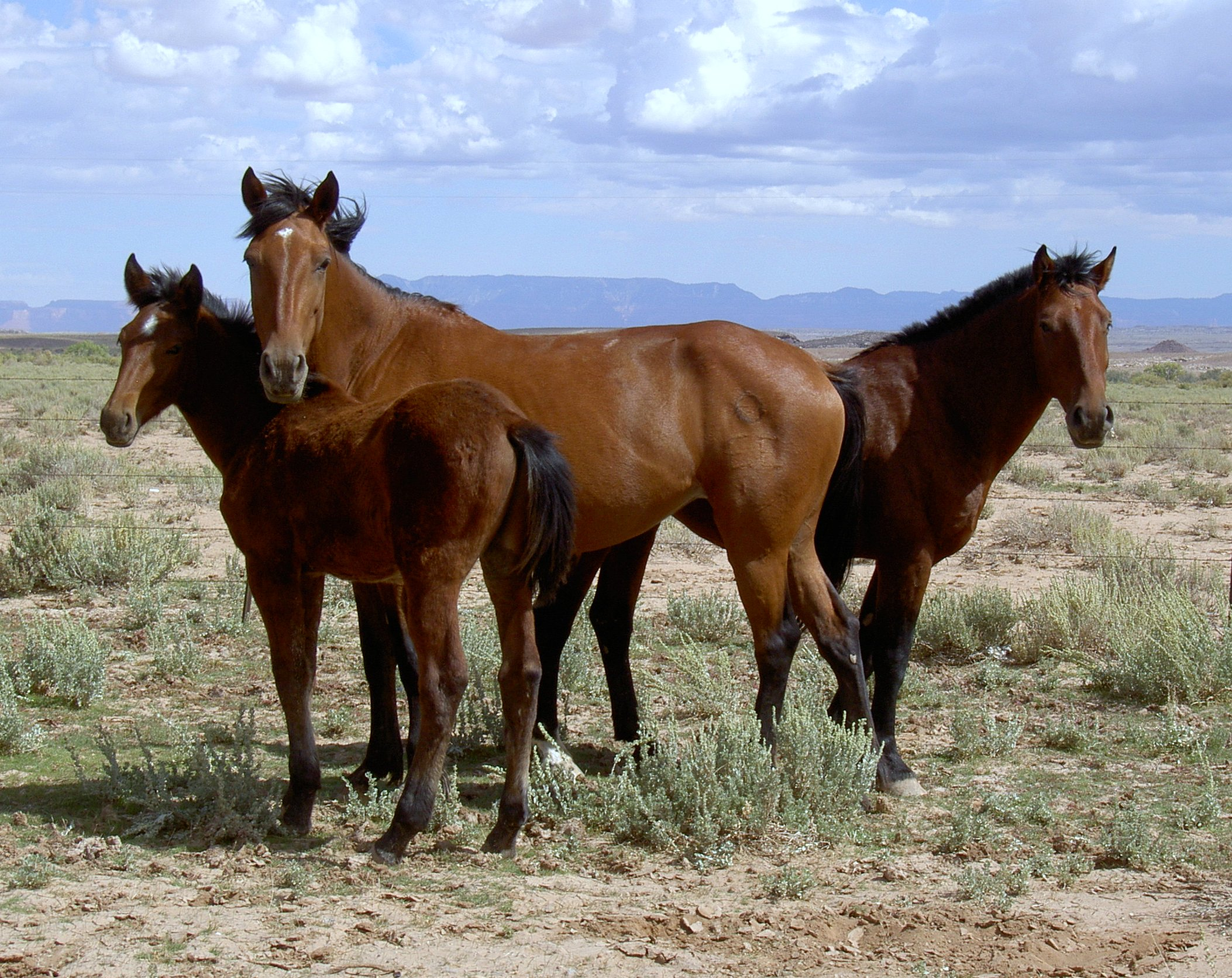
Wild mustangs in Arizona

In 2001, the non-profit Mustang Heritage Foundation was established aiming to help the BLM find homes for mustangs and burros collected from the wild and to minimize the number of time these animals have to remain in holding facilities. The organization has facilitated the adoption of thousands of animals.

In 2007, the MHF held its first Extreme Mustang Makeover event in Fort Worth. The Foundation arranged for 100 horse trainers to spend 100 days training 100 mustangs fresh from the wild. During the event, the trainers competed for prizes to demonstrate how domesticated their horses were and how ready for real-world use. The wildly successful event has since been held annually and similar events are now held across the country to promote interest in mustangs.

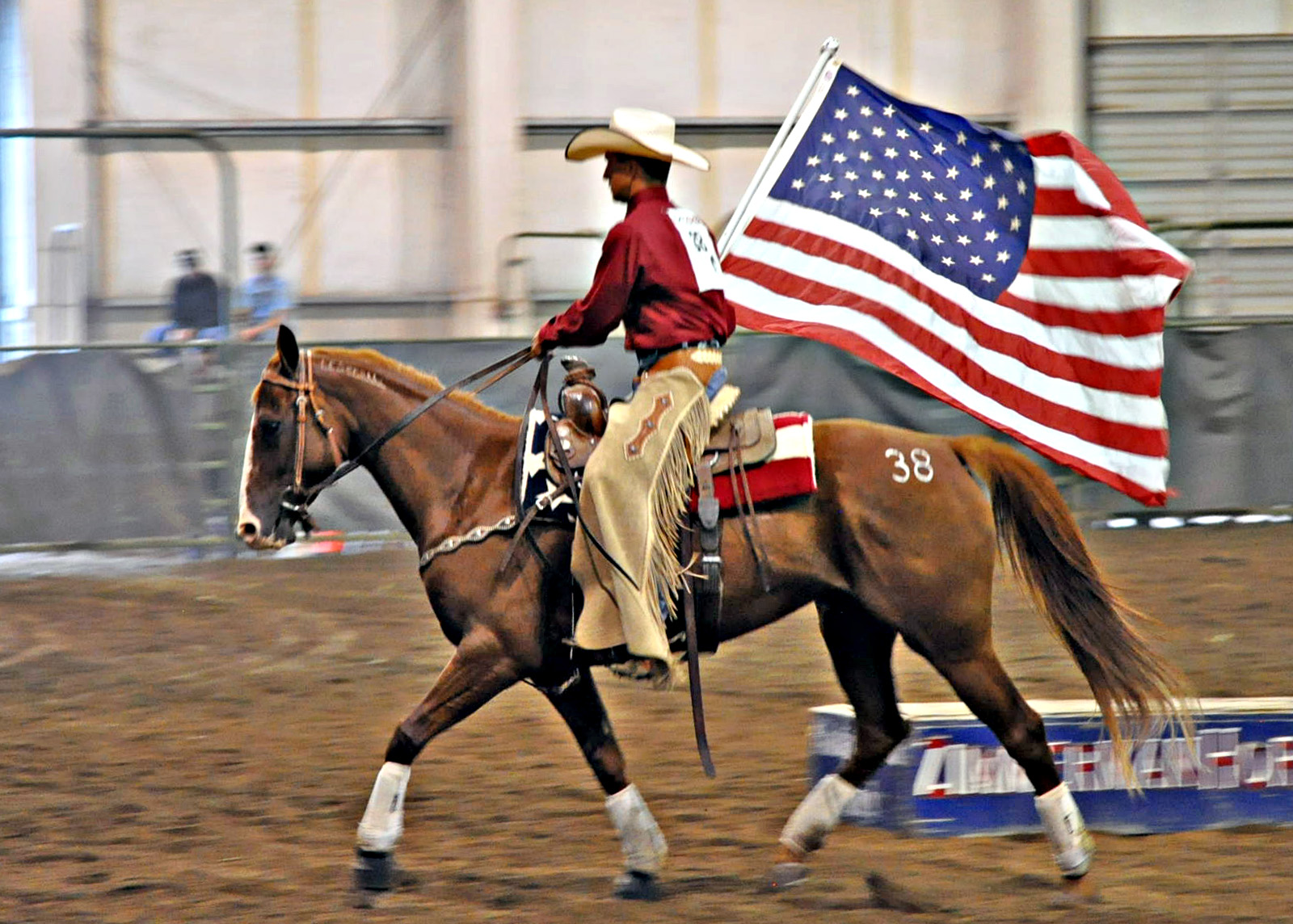
Extreme Mustang Makeover in Oregon

To further advance the cause and promote acceptance of mustangs in the equestrian community, the Mustang Champions organization was founded. The organization established twin competitions for mustang trainers: the Mustang Challenge in Las Vegas featuring Western skills tournaments, and the Mustang Classic in Lexington featuring English eventing. The inaugural events were held in 2024.

== 2024 competition ==
Logo of the 2024 event

The 2024 edition was inaugural event for the Mustang Classic. Sixty-one competitors registered to take part in the event, which took place September 13–15. It featured US$125,000 in cash and prizes, with $50,000 going to the grand champion. The presenting sponsor of the event was Practical Horseman magazine.

The top 10 heading into the finals were:

Hip	Rider	Mount	Dressage	Cross-Country	Working Equitation	Show Jumping	Total
52	Elisa Wallace	Zephyr	72	86		74	232
42	Samantha Rock	Handy Dandy	67	87		77	231
56	Laura Wilson	Sporty Shorty	70	82		73	225
17	Ann Hanlin	QR Code	70	82		70	222
6	Chelsea Canedy	Luna	66	82		71	220
46	Sierra Steffen	Dazzle	68	72		74	214
~~33~~	~~Kaylianna Huber~~	~~Nostalgia~~	63	84		64	211
22	Lily Hughes	London Fog	67	83		60	210
19	Amber Hoffmaier	Snoop Dogg	56	81		68	205
11	Jessica Flaherty	Inky	64	82		59	205
38	Chris Phillips	WFR Sin City Sister	67	74		63	203

Contestants were given the option of doing the cross-country test or the working equitation test. Because of scoring irregularities, the scores were republished more than once before being finalized. Also, Huber's withdrawal from the competition brought Phillips into the finals.

The following were the leaders for each of the classes:

Class	Hip	Rider	Mount
Dressage	52	Elisa Wallace (Florida)	Zephyr
Cross-Country	42	Samantha Rock (Colorado)	Handy Dandy
Working Equitation	33	Craig Moore (Texas)	Toby
Show Jumping	42	Samantha Rock (Colorado)	Handy Dandy

After the freestyle finals competition, the winners were:

Position	Hip	Rider	Mount	BLM Freezemark
Grand champion	52	Elisa Wallace (Florida)	Zephyr	19900125
Reserve champion	42	Samantha Rock (Colorado)	Handy Dandy	19843555
3rd	38	Chris Phillips (Utah)	WFR Sin City Sister	19375017
4th	11	Jessica Flaherty (Maine)	Inky	18737835
5th	17	Ann Hanlin (Maryland)	QR Code	19843530

Elisa Wallace for her part was previously a top-10 finisher at the Rolex Kentucky Three-Day Event in 2016, as well as an alternate for the U.S. Olympic Team. Chris Phillips and Samantha Rock were notable for having finished in the top 5 for both the Mustang Challenge and the Mustang Classic in 2024.

== Media coverage ==
The 2024 event was covered by the EQUUS television network in a livestream featuring journalist Diana de Rosa. The event was also covered by the Equestrian+ network and EventingNation.com via livestream.

Practical Horseman magazine, the chief sponsor, provided detailed written coverage. A number of other print sources covered the event including Horse Illustrated and Dressage Today.

== See also ==
- List of Bureau of Land Management Herd Management Areas
