= Mustang Challenge =

Annual horse competition in Las Vegas, NV

- Sanctioning body: Mustang Champions
- Location: South Point Arena, Las Vegas, NV, USA
- Held: Annually
- Length: 3 days
- Sponsors: Western Horseman; U.S. Bureau of Land Management
- Inaugurated: 2024
- Breeds shown: Mustang
- Total purse: US$125,000
- Slogan: Be a hero to an American Mustang.
- Website: www.mustangchallenge2025.com

The Mustang Champions Western Challenge, or simply the Mustang Challenge, held in Las Vegas, is an equestrian competition held annually in July by the Mustang Champions organization, in conjunction with the Bureau of Land Management. It is a sister event to the Mustang Classic held in Lexington, Kentucky during the fall, and both are intended to complement the Extreme Mustang Makeover events.

The event's purpose is "to showcase the skill and adaptability of the American Mustang and the talented trainers that work with them in the Western discipline".

== History ==
The Wild Horse and Burro Program was created in 1971 by the Bureau of Land Management, part of the United States Department of the Interior. Its purpose was to manage the herds of feral horses and donkeys roaming lands in the Western US. This involves controlling the sizes of the herds so that they do not tax the natural resources too much and endanger themselves or other animals. Ideally the BLM tries to have the mustangs and burros that it removes from the wild adopted by individuals or organizations. This has become more challenging as the years have passed.

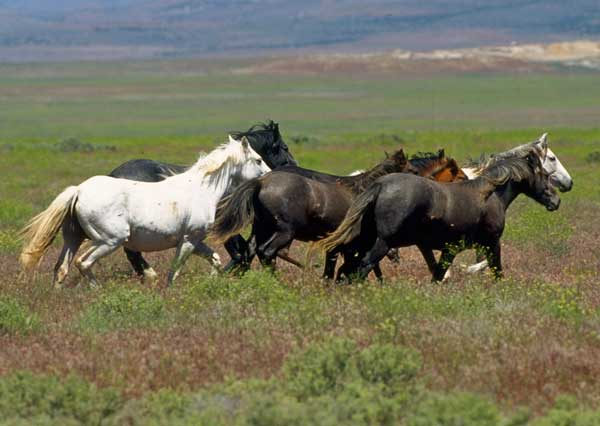
Wild mustangs on BLM land

In 2001, the non-profit Mustang Heritage Foundation was established aiming to help the BLM find homes for mustangs and burros collected from the wild and to minimize the amount of time these animals have to remain in holding facilities. The organization has facilitated the adoption of thousands of animals.

In 2007, the MHF held its first Extreme Mustang Makeover event in Fort Worth. The Foundation arranged for 100 horse trainers to spend 100 days training 100 mustangs fresh from the wild. During the event, the trainers competed for prizes to demonstrate how domesticated their horses were and how ready for real-world use. The wildly successful event has since been held annually and similar events are now held across the country to promote interest in mustangs.

To further advance the cause and promote acceptance of mustangs in the equestrian community, the Mustang Champions organization was founded. The organization established twin competitions for mustang trainers: the Mustang Challenge in Las Vegas featuring Western skills tournaments, and the Mustang Classic in Lexington featuring English eventing. The inaugural events were held in 2024.

== Competitions ==
=== 2025 ===
The 2025 event was held July 10–12, sponsored by Western Horseman magazine, and offered US$125,000 in cash and prizes. There were 51 entrants registered. Eligible horses must have been adopted from the BLM after October 1, 2024. The event consisted of three classes of competition: Reigning patten, Trail riding, Ranch riding. The top competitors from these classes went on to the finals competition.

The following were the leaders of each class:

| Class | Hip | Rider | Mount | BLM Freezemark |
|---|---|---|---|---|
| Ranch riding | 38 | Matt Zimmerman | Peso | 2133682 |
| Reigning pattern | 38 | Matt Zimmerman | Peso | 2133682 |
| Trail riding | 14 | Justis Jacobs | Americas Most Wanted | 21905564 |

The following were the top 10 overall heading into the final:

| Hip | Rider | Mount | BLM Freezemark |
|---|---|---|---|
| 11 | Tauni Huddleston | Bad Ash | 21739359 |
| 38 | Matt Zimmerman | Peso | 21323682 |
| 34 | Camille White | Deuce Is Wild | 21870975 |
| 13 | Justis Jacobs | Angel Eyes | 20898315 |
| 14 | Justis Jacobs | Americas Most Wanted | 21905564 |
| 18 | Craig Moore | MH Disco Boy | 19901752 |
| 26 | Samantha Rock | Just Blazin | 20864569 |
| 45 | Levi Beechy | Hyrum | 20903191 |
| 27 | Samantha Rock | Smart Cookie | 19890624 |
| 54 | Luke Castro | Stay Golden | 21226521 |

The winners after the finals were:

| Position | Hip | Rider | Mount | BLM Freezemark |
|---|---|---|---|---|
| Grand champion | 14 | Justis Jacobs | Americas Most Wanted | 21905564 |
| Reserve champion | 38 | Matt Zimmerman | Peso | 21323682 |
| 3rd | 13 | Justis Jacobs | Angel Eyes | 20898315 |
| 4th | 26 | Samantha Rock | Just Blazin | 20864569 |
| 5th | 11 | Tauni Huddleston | Bad Ash | 21739359 |

The event was livestreamed by Equus TV and Ride TV.

=== 2024 ===
The 2024 event featured US$125,000 in cash and prizes. It was sponsored by Western Horseman magazine. There were 64 entrants registered.

The following were the leaders of each class:

| Class | Hip | Rider | Mount | BLM Freezemark |
|---|---|---|---|---|
| Ranch riding | 13 | Cavin Graham | Vegas Showgirl | 19376298 |
| Reigning pattern | 22 | Justis Jacobs | Roses Are Red | 17376083 |
| Trail riding | 13 | Cavin Graham | Vegas Showgirl | 19376298 |

The winners after the finals were:

| Position | Hip | Rider | Mount | BLM Freezemark |
|---|---|---|---|---|
| Grand champion | 33 | Chris Phillips | WFR Sin City Sister | 19375017 |
| Reserve champion | 58 | Whitney Campbell | Cinder | 19027912 |
| 3rd | 22 | Justis Jacobs | Roses Are Red | 17376083 |
| 4th | 36 | Samantha Rock | Handy Dandy | 19843555 |
| 5th | 13 | Cavin Graham | Vegas Showgirl | 19376298 |

Chris Phillips and Samantha Rock were additionally notable for having finished in the top 5 for both the Mustang Challenge and the Mustang Classic in 2024.

== See also ==
- List of Bureau of Land Management Herd Management Areas
