= Mustang Heritage Foundation =

Organization dedicated to promoting the welfare for American Mustangs

- Formation: 2001; 25 years ago
- Type: 501(c)3 non-profit
- Tax ID no.: 88-0512149
- Purpose: Promoting welfare of American mustangs and burros
- Headquarters: Round Rock, Texas
- Region served: United States
- Chair: Gary Holt
- Funding: US Bureau of Land Management, various industry sponsors
- Website: mustangheritagefoundation.org

The Mustang Heritage Foundation, is an American organization dedicated to supporting the welfare of feral horses (mustangs) and donkeys (burros). The organization works closely with the US Bureau of Land Management to support its efforts.

As of 2016, programs run by the Mustang Heritage Foundation had resulted in over 6300 mustangs being adopted. These adoptions saved the BLM (and consequently taxpayers) over $217 million. The most famous of its programs is the Extreme Mustang Makeover, a competition among horse trainers to quickly train mustangs and showcase their skills. As of 2024 more than 25,000 adoptions have been facilitated, though still 60,000 mustangs remain in BLM holding facilities.

The MHF receives substantial funding from the BLM, $4 million in 2023. It also receives funding from various industry sponsors including Western Horseman magazine, Dodge, Purina, and many others.

Note that the Mustang Heritage Foundation is separate from, but affiliated with, the Mustang Champions organization, which runs the Mustang Magic, Mustang Challenge and Mustang Classic events.

== History ==
The Wild Horse and Burro Program was created in 1971 by the Bureau of Land Management, part of the United States Department of the Interior. Its purpose was to manage the herds of feral horses and donkeys roaming lands in the Western US. This involves controlling the sizes of the herds so that they do not tax the natural resources too much and endanger themselves or other animals. Ideally the BLM tries to have the mustangs and burros it removes from the wild adopted privately. This has become more challenging as the years have passed. Though nominally the BLM attempts to find good homes for the horses, some do get sent off to slaughter.

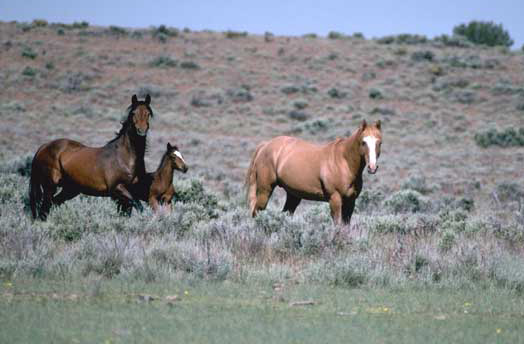
Wild mustangs

In 2001, the Mustang Heritage Foundation was established aiming to help the BLM find homes for mustangs and burros collected from the wild and to minimize the amount of time these animals have to remain in holding facilities. The organization has facilitated the adoption of thousands of animals.

In 2007, the MHF held its first Extreme Mustang Makeover event in Fort Worth. The Foundation arranged for 100 horse trainers to spend 100 days training 100 mustangs fresh from the wild. During the event, the trainers competed for prizes to demonstrate how domesticated their horses were and how ready for real-world use. The wildly successful event has since been held annually and similar events are now held across the country to promote interest in mustangs.

At the same time that the Extreme Mustang Makeover was founded, the Trainer Incentive Program was also founded. The TIP program provided funds to horse trainers who choose to take on mustangs. In conjunction with the EMM, TIP helped indirectly encourage many adoptions. The TIP program was discontinued in 2023 because of a withdrawal of funding by the BLM.

== Extreme Mustang Makeover ==
Logo of the Extreme Mustang Makeover

The signature creation of the Mustang Heritage Foundation has been the Extreme Mustang Makeover. Talented trainers from around the country compete to train newly acquired mustangs from the Bureau of Land Management in 100 days and showcase their skills in arena competitions. The showcased horses are then auctioned for adoption. The proceeds from the sales of these trained horses are split between the trainers and the BLM. Not only this, the publicity generated by the competition helps spark interest in other mustangs that the BLM brings to these events.

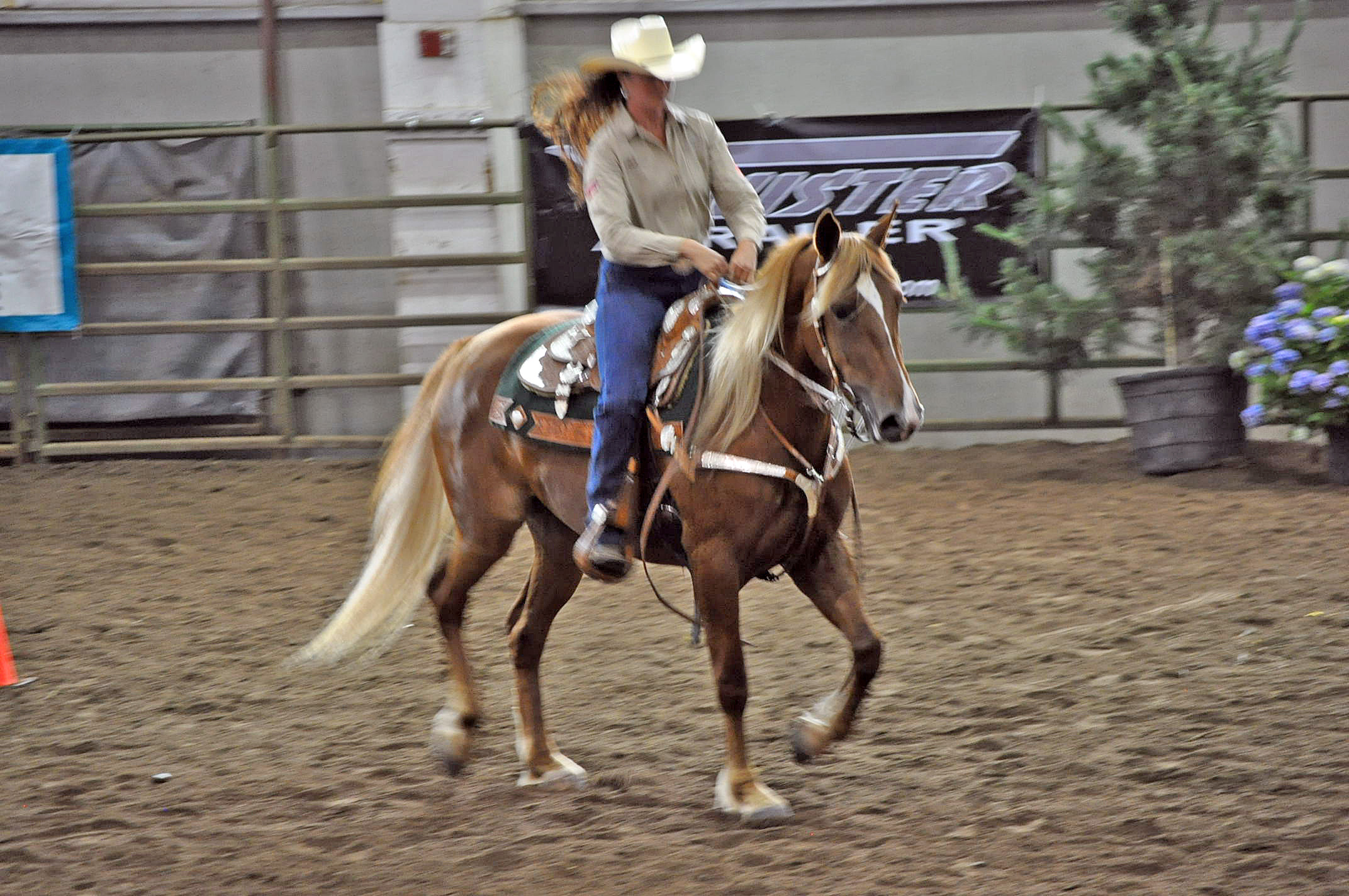
Horse and rider in Extreme Mustang Makeover event

Starting from one event in 2007 this concept has blossomed into multiple events across the country, some directly sponsored by the MHF and some sponsored by other organizations. In 2024, there was:

- Mustang Magic, Fort Worth, TX - Jan 19-21
- Mustang Heritage Spectacular, Franklin, TN - Jun 11
- Meeker Mustang Makeover, Seeker, CO - Aug 24
- Fort Worth Mustang Show, Fort Worth TX - Sep 6-7
- EMM New Jersey, Logan Township, NJ - Oct 20-24
- EMM, Glen Rose, TX - Dec 6-7

In addition to the regular Extreme Mustang Makeover programs, the MHF also runs an EMM Youth Division that allows teenage mustang enthusiasts to train mustangs and compete for prizes.

== Other programs ==
The MHF has maintained various other programs over the years, including:

- Trainer Incentive Program
- Trainer's Council
- Veterans and Mustangs
- Youth Scholarship Program
- Mustang Million
- Mustang Storefront
- America's Mustang Campaign
- Mustang Heritage Open
- Meet the Mustang

== See also ==
- Free-roaming horse management in North America
- List of Bureau of Land Management Herd Management Areas
- Mustang Challenge
- Mustang Classic
