= Prices paid index =

The Prices paid index is an index that measures changes in the prices paid for goods and services used in crop and livestock production and family living. The production component of the index accounts for over 65% of the total, and family living expenses represented by the CPI-U account for less than 20% of the index. The remaining components are interest charges on farm real estate and non-real estate debt, taxes payable on farm real estate, and wage rates paid to hired farm labor. NASS currently publishes the index on a 1990-92 = 100 base. Used in calculating the federal grazing fee, among other purposes. The index of prices paid on a 1910-14 = 100 base is called the parity index and is used in calculating the parity ratio.

== See also ==
- Prices received index
