= Prices received index =

American price index

The prices received index is an index that measures changes in the prices received for crops and livestock within the United States. The National Agricultural Statistics Service currently publishes the index on a 1990-92 = 100 base. A ratio of the prices received index to the prices paid index on the 1990-92 base that is greater than 100% indicates that farm commodity prices have increased at a faster rate than farm input prices. When the ratio is less than 100%, farm input prices are increasing a more rapid pace than farm commodity prices. The prices received index and the prices paid index are used to calculate the parity ratio.

== See also ==
- Prices paid index
