= Practical Horseman =

American equestrian magazine

- Categories: Equine magazine
- Frequency: Monthly
- Founded: 1973
- Company: Equine Network
- Country: United States
- Based in: Gaithersburg, Maryland
- Language: English
- Website: practicalhorsemanmag.com
- OCLC: 47822012

Practical Horseman is an American equestrian magazine that focuses on English-style riding, most notably hunter/jumpers as well as dressage and eventing.

== History and profile ==
The magazine was founded in 1973 with the name The Pennsylvania Horse. It was formerly published by Cowles Magazines and part of Cowles Enthusiast Titles. In 1998, Primedia (now Rent Group) bought the company and also, the magazine. The magazine was published by the Equine Network, a subsidiary of Source Interlink, until 2010 when it was acquired by Active Interest Media. In 2021, Active Interest Media sold its Equine Network properties to Growth Catalyst Partners. Practical Horseman was formerly headquartered in Unionville, Pennsylvania. Its headquarters is in Gaithersburg, Maryland.

Known as the "English rider's #1 resource," the magazine has monthly articles on training, riding, turnout of the horse, equine medical issues, profiles of riders, and reviews and results of national and international competitions. The website of the magazine was launched in 2008.

== Staff ==
- Editor: Sandra Oliynyk
- Assistant Editor: Emily Daily
- Assistant Editor: Jocelyn Pierce
- Art Director: Philip S. Cooper

== See also ==
- Mustang Classic (sponsored by PH)
