= Dry Sheep Equivalent =

Dry Sheep Equivalent (DSE) is a standard unit frequently used in Australia to compare the feed requirements of different classes of stock or to assess the carrying capacity and potential productivity of a given farm or area of grazing land.

The unit represents the amount of feed required by a two-year-old, 45 kg (some sources state 50 kg) Merino sheep (wether or non-lactating, non-pregnant ewe) to maintain its weight. One DSE is equivalent to 7.60 megajoule (MJ) per day.

The carrying capacity of a farm is commonly determined in Australia by expressing the number of stock carried during a period of feed shortage in terms of their DSEs.

Benchmarking standards used by Grazing for Profit programmes quote that one labour unit (40 hours per week) is required for 6,000 DSE (other benchmarking standards set the figure at 7,000 DSE).

== See also ==
- Livestock grazing comparison
- Sheep

== References and notes ==
- "Sustainable carrying capacity: Monitoring tools" (PDF). Department of Primary Industries, Victoria, Australia. 2005.
- McLaren, Colin (1997). "Dry Sheep Equivalents for comparing different classes of livestock" (PDF). Information Notes. Department of Primary Industries, Victoria, Australia. Archived from the original (PDF) on 2011-05-17.
- Millear, George; Anne Conway; Tony Mills (2003). "Calculating a gross margin for sheep, goat and cattle enterprises". Queensland Government: Department of Primary Industries and Fisheries. Archived from the original on 2006-08-23.
