= Livestock grazing comparison =

Measure of the number of livestock in relation to the area used for them

Livestock grazing comparison is a method of comparing the numbers and density of livestock grazing in agriculture. Various units of measurement are used, usually based on the grazing equivalent of one adult cow, or in some areas on that of one sheep. Many different schemes exist, giving various values to the grazing effect of different types of animal.

== Use ==
Livestock grazing comparison units are used for assessing the overall effect on grazing land of different types of animals (or of mixtures of animals), expressed either as a total for a whole field or farm, or as units per hectare (ha) or acre. For example, using UK government Livestock Units (LUs) from the 2003 scheme a particular 10 ha (25-acre) pasture field might be able to support 15 adult cattle or 25 horses or 100 sheep: in that scheme each of these would be regarded as being 15 LUs, or 1.5 LUs per hectare (about 0.6 LUs per acre).

Different species (and breeds) of livestock do not all graze in the same way, and this is also taken into account when deciding the appropriate number of units for grazing land. For example, horses naturally graze unevenly, eating short grass areas first and only grazing longer turf if there is insufficient short grass; cattle graze longer grass preferentially, tending to produce a uniform sward; goats tend to browse shrubs if these are available. As these feeding styles are complementary, a pasture may therefore support slightly more units of mixed species than of each species separately. Another consequence of different grazing styles is variation between species in the number of units that can lead to overgrazing – for example, horses may overgraze the short parts of a pasture even when taller grass is still available.

Livestock grazing comparison units are used by many governments to measure and control the intensity of farming. For example, until 2004 the UK Government had an extensification scheme which paid additional subsidy to farmers who kept their livestock at less than an average of 1.4 LUs per hectare.

== Schemes ==
Although different schemes have similar aims, they vary in complexity and detail. For example, some schemes give no value to a young calf, but an additional value to a cow together with her calf at foot. Some give values to different-sized animals of the same species, or different values to the same species in different regions. Most schemes use a calculation based on the weight of the animal. Some use figures for animals of different sizes which are directly proportional to their weight – for example the 2006 UK Government scheme uses a figure for ruminants of the animal's weight (in kilograms) divided by 650. Others include an adjustment for the proportionally higher metabolic rate of smaller animals, according to Kleiber's law, which states that the metabolic rate of most animals varies according to their weight raised to the power of approximately 0.75. For example, the Food and Agriculture Organization's Tropical Livestock Unit is based on the weight of the animal raised to the power of 0.75, compared with the equivalent figure for a "tropical cow" of 250 kg (550 lb).

The following is a summary of some schemes in common use, using the most closely comparable categories:

Unit	Livestock Unit: UK government 2006	Livestock Unit: The John Nix Farm Management Pocketbook	Animal unit	FAO Livestock Unit (North America)	FAO Livestock Unit (Sub-Saharan Africa)	Tropical Livestock Unit (Unité Bovin Tropical)	Unité de Gros Bétail, Livestock Unit	Dry Sheep Equivalent	Ewe Equivalent, Stock Unit or Livestock Unit
Abbreviation	LU, LSU	LU, LSU	AU			TLU, UBT	UGB, LU	DSE	EE, LSU
Region	UK	UK	US	North America	Sub-Saharan Africa	Tropics	Europe	Australia	New Zealand
Unit equivalent to	Dairy cow	Dairy cow	Beef cow			Tropical cow	Dairy cow producing 3,000 L (790 US gal) milk	2-year-old dry Merino sheep	Ewe with one lamb
Weight equivalent of one unit	650 kg (1,430 lb)		455 kg (1,003 lb)			250 kg (550 lb)	600 kg (1,300 lb)	45 kg (99 lb)	55 kg (121 lb)
Dairy cow	1.00	1.00		1.00	0.50	0.70	1.00	20.0	8.0
Dry medium beef cow	0.70	0.75	1.00	1.00	0.50		0.80	8.0	6.3
Medium beef cow suckling	0.90	0.80		1.00	0.50			18.0	
Calf under 6 months	0.00	0.34					0.10	0.0	2.5
Cow and unweaned calf	0.90	1.14					0.90	18.0	8.8
Heifer or steer under 1 year	0.60	0.34					0.30	10.0	
Heifer or steer under 2 years	0.60	0.65	0.80				0.40	12.0	4.5
Heifer or steer over 2 years	0.70	0.80					0.60	9.0	6.0
Bull	0.90	0.65		1.00	0.50		0.60	10.0	6.0
Horse	1.00	0.80	1.20	0.80	0.80		0.70	10.0	
Medium sheep	0.08	0.08	0.20	0.15	0.10	0.10	0.17	1.0	1.0
Goat	0.10	0.16		0.10	0.10	0.10	0.17	1.0	2.0
Bison	1.10						0.80		
Water buffalo	0.70			1.00	0.50		0.80		
Llama	0.25	0.45					0.17		
Camel	0.75			1.10	1.10	1.00			
Pig		0.20		0.25	0.20		0.26		

=== Central Europe ===
The size of a livestock farm in Central Europe was traditionally given in Stößen (singular: Stoß) This unit of measurement was subsequently replaced by the grazing livestock unit or Großvieheinheit (GV).

==== Stoß ====
The Stoß is a unit of cattle stock density used in the Alps. For each Alm or Alp it is worked out how many Stoß (Swiss: Stössen) can be grazed (bestoßen); one cow equals one Stoß, 3 bulls equal 2 Stöße, a calf is 1/4 Stoß, a horse of 1, 2 or 3 years old is worth 1, 2 or 3 Stöße, a pig equals 1/4, a goat or a sheep is 1/5 Stoß.

In Switzerland a Normalstoß is defined as a Großvieheinheit that is "summered" for 100 days. For small livestock there are corresponding conversions. Depending on the quality of the Alp or Alm a full Stoß may require between 1/2 ha and 2 ha.

The Stoß is divided into feet or Füße. A full Stoß is the pasture required by a cow, and equals 4 Füße. Bulls, calves, etc., are a fraction of that, e.g. a one-year old bull needs 2 Füße.

==== Großvieheinheit ====
A Großvieheinheit (GV or GVE) is a conversion key used to compare different farm animals on the basis of their live weight. A Großvieheinheit represents 500 kilogrammes (roughly the weight of an adult bull). In the wild it excludes small animals like amphibians and insects, but is used for game in forestry and hunting.

Examples are:

- Calf 50–100 kg = 0.1–0.2 GV
- Young milk cow 450–650 kg = 0.9–1.3 GV
- Milk cow = 1 GV
- Horse = 0.8–1.5 GV
- Boar = 0.3 GV
- Domestic pig = 0.12 GV
- Piglet = 0.01 GV
- Sheep = 0.1 GV
- 100 Chickens = 0.8–1 GV
- 320 egg-laying chickens = 1 GV

A more precise unit is the "fodder-consuming livestock unit" or Raufutter verzehrende Großvieheinheit (RGV), which corrects the value above based on the demands of a given species and direct, near-natural supply of food (fibre-rich roughage) without concentrates.

The "tropical livestock unit" or (tropische Vieheinheit) or TLU is based on a live weight of 250 kg.

== Aquaculture and hunting ==
Analogous units are :

- Fish population (Fischbesatz) in fishing, is a measure of the stock of fish in a waterbody
- Game population (Wildbesatz), in hunting is the stock of game in a reserve
