= Waif and stray =

Legal privilege under Anglo-Norman law

Waif and stray was a legal privilege commonly granted by the Crown to landowners under Anglo-Norman law. It usually appeared as part of a standard formula in charters granting privileges to estate-holders, along the lines of "with sac and soc, toll and team, infangthief and outfangthief" and so on.

A waif was an item of ownerless and unclaimed property found on a landowner's territory, while stray referred to a domestic animal that had wandered onto the same land. Both terms originated from Anglo-Norman French. A grant of waif and stray permitted the landowner to take ownership of such goods or animals if they remained unclaimed after a set period of time. In late medieval England, the management of waifs and strays required the coordination and cooperation of lords and the local communities they presided over.

In later centuries, the expression "waifs and strays" came to be used as metaphors for – and ultimately became synonymous with – abandoned or neglected children.

== See also ==
- Estray
