= Grazing fee =

Agricultural fee

A grazing fee is a charge, usually on a monthly basis, for grazing a specific kind of livestock.

== Australia ==
In New South Wales, Australia, maximum grazing fees have been set by regulation at $1.00 per head of large stock or per 10 (or less) head of small stock per day; lower fees may be set by individual authorities. Agistment on private land in Queensland, Australia, has sometimes been at rates of $5 per head per week when demand is high.

== United States ==
In the United States, grazing fees are generally charged per AUM (animal unit month). (Some additional fee or fees may be charged in various jurisdictions, e.g. per application.) On US federal grazing land, the grazing fee for 2012 (as for 2011) is $1.35 per AUM. As of 2015, the grazing fee has been increased to $1.69. Over several decades, the fees charged on US federal rangelands have generally been substantially lower than rates charged on private lands in the US. In 2006, the grazing fee on Oregon state lands was $5.60 per AUM.

== Canada ==
In 2015, grazing fees on Crown land in the province of British Columbia are $3.20 per AUM. In comparison, 2012 grazing rates in Alberta were $1.39-$2.79/AUM.

== Calculation formulas ==
Various formulas are used for calculating grazing fees on public lands. Some examples are:

- For federal rangelands of the United States,

the grazing fee "equals the $1.23 base established by the 1966 Western Livestock Grazing Survey multiplied by the result of the Forage Value Index (a derived index of the relative change in the previous year's average monthly rate per head for pasturing cattle, computed annually from data supplied by the Statistical Reporting Service) added to the Combined Index (Beef Cattle Price index minus the Prices Paid Index) and divided by 100; provided, that the annual increase or decrease in such fee for any given year shall be limited to not more than plus or minus 25 percent of the previous year's fee, and provided further, that the fee shall not be less than $1.35 per animal unit month." Apart from the $1.35 floor, which took effect on February 14, 1986, this is the same as the fee calculation that applied for the grazing years 1979 through 1985.

- For lands of the state of Oregon,

the grazing fee is the greatest of a) $250; (b) $4.25 per AUM; or (c) The carrying capacity of the leasehold in AUMs multiplied by the annual AUM rate (expressed in dollars per AUM). The annual AUM compensation rate equals G x CC x S x P, where G is animal gain per month (set at 35 pounds, since January 1, 2010), CC is marketable calf crop (fixed at 80 percent), S is state share of calf gain (set at 25 percent on January 1, 2012), and P is calf price (90 % of the USDA national price data indicating average sale price for the preceding one year period based on an October through September year).

- For a grazing license or permit on Crown land in the province of British Columbia,

the grazing fee per authorized AUM is "93% of the average gross sales revenue per kilogram for live beef cattle marketed during the immediately preceding 3 years through the B.C. Livestock Producers Cooperative Association.".
