= Western Horseman =

US horse magazine

- Western Horseman, April 2005
- Frequency: Monthly
- Publisher: Morris Communications
- Total circulation: 167,531 (2011)
- Founder: Paul Albert
- Founded: 1936
- First issue: January 1936
- Company: Morris Magazines
- Country: United States
- Based in: Fort Worth, Texas
- Language: English
- Website: westernhorseman.com
- ISSN: 0043-3837

Western Horseman, a monthly magazine published by the magazine division of Morris Communications, was first published in January 1936. It features articles on Western riding, the breeding and care of horses, horse training and tack, and ranching. It is the category leader in equine publishing and is known as "The World's Leading Horse Magazine Since 1936," and as "America's Favorite Horse Magazine Since 1936."

== History and profile ==
Western Horseman was first published in Lafayette, California in January 1936. Paul T. Albert founded and edited the magazine until his death in 1942. His widow Worth K. Albert then sold it to C.E. Dean, of Reno, in 1943, who later that year resold it to Merritt C. Speidel of Speidel Newspapers. Graham M. Dean was then named publication director, and company executive John Ben Snow headed the magazine.

In 1948, the magazine was relocated to Colorado Springs, Colorado. In 2001, Morris Communications acquired the magazine. At that time it had 28 fulltime employees and a circulation of 220,000. In February 2010 the headquarters of the magazine moved from Colorado Springs, Colorado, to Fort Worth, Texas, after 62 years.

In May 2011, Randy Witte published a book about Western Horseman, entitled History of Western Horseman.

== See also ==
- Mustang Challenge (sponsored by WH)
