= Animal unit =

Unit of livestock measurement in planning

The concept of an animal unit (AU) has traditionally been used in North America to facilitate planning, analysis and administration of forage use by grazing livestock, but the term has also had other applications (in relation to odor control regulation, feedlot size, manure management, etc.). The term has been variously defined by regulation in different jurisdictions, and by livestock management specialists, rangeland resource managers and others. Consequently, when using or interpreting the term, care is needed to ensure that a definition appropriate for the purpose is being used. Most (but not all) definitions are based on the concept that a 1000-pound (454 kg) cow, with or without an unweaned calf, is one animal unit, with such a cow being assumed to consume 26 pounds (about 12 kg) of forage dry matter per day.

Animal unit months (AUMs) in a grazing area (calculated by multiplying the number of animal units by the number of months of grazing) provide a useful indicator of the amount of forage consumed. On public lands in various jurisdictions, authorized use of forage for grazing is commonly expressed in animal unit months.

== Grazing livestock ==
In the USA, the federal grazing fee, which applies to Federal lands in 16 Western states on public lands managed by the BLM and the U.S. Forest Service, is adjusted annually and is calculated by using a formula originally set by Congress in the Public Rangelands Improvement Act of 1978. Under this formula, as modified and extended by a presidential Executive Order issued in 1986, the grazing fee cannot fall below $1.35 per animal unit month (AUM); also, any fee increase or decrease cannot exceed 25 percent of the previous year's level. (On these federal grazing lands, an AUM is the amount of forage needed to sustain one cow and her calf, one horse, or five sheep or goats for a month.) The grazing fee for 2012 is $1.35 per AUM, the same level as it was in 2011. For a grazing license or permit on Crown land in British Columbia, the grazing fee per authorized AUM is "93% of the average gross sales revenue per kilogram for live beef cattle marketed during the immediately preceding 3 years through the B.C. Livestock Producers Cooperative Association."

For grazing livestock, most differences in definition relate to how animal unit equivalents should be calculated for weights and classes of livestock other than 1000-pound cows. Different approaches have included:

- Estimation based on forage consumption assumptions.

In this commonly applied type of estimation, the number of animal units may be calculated as the ratio of daily forage dry matter mass consumption, in kg, divided by 12 kg (or daily forage dry matter weight consumption, in pounds, divided by 26 pounds), based on the assumption that daily forage dry matter intake by a 1000-pound cow (with or without unweaned calf) is 2.6 percent of body weight. For example, some animal unit calculations used in Texas assume that daily forage dry matter consumption by a 90-pound nanny Spanish goat is 4.5 percent of body weight. Thus the nanny:cow ratio of daily dry matter consumption is estimated at 4.5:26, or about 0.16. This yields the estimate that such a nanny is equivalent to about 0.16 animal units. Rather than being calculated on a precise live mass basis, some estimates of this type have been generalized in tabulations (by species) according to age or sex classes, e.g. mature sheep, 0.2; lamb (weaned to yearling), 0.12; lamb (yearling), 0.15; ram, 0.25.

- Linear estimation based on body mass or weight.

This simple method is sometimes used for cattle. The number of animal units represented by one or more head of cattle may be calculated by dividing their total body mass in kg by 454 (or dividing their weight in pounds by 1000). Thus an 800-pound steer would be considered equivalent to 0.8 animal units.

- Estimation based on metabolic body size.

In this method, which has been suggested for cattle, the number of animal units represented by an animal can be calculated as the ratio of that individual's body mass (in kg) to the 0.75 power, divided by 454 to the 0.75 power. Such a calculation reflects an assumption that feed requirement will be proportional to metabolic body size. (Metabolic body size is commonly defined as body mass, in kg, to the 0.75 power.) Using this method of calculation, an 800-pound steer would be considered equivalent to 0.85 animal units.

== Regulatory definitions ==
Federal land management agencies, such as the Bureau of Land Management and the National Forest Service, may use different standards for setting grazing fees. The Natural Resources Conservation Service uses animal units to estimate manure production and manure nutrient content when designing projects under the Environmental Quality Incentives Program (EQIP). The Environmental Protection Agency does not use the term animal units to define size classes for purposes of compliance with effluent limitations for Concentrated Animal Feeding Operations (CAFOs). Instead it sets thresholds by specifying the actual number of animals.

Regulatory definitions of animal unit equivalents also vary according to purpose and also vary among jurisdictions. For various species, they are often based on age and sex categories, rather than precise weights. Some examples are:

- In British Columbia, the Range Regulation defines "animal unit month" for purposes of the Range Act. Effectively, the regulation assigns animal unit equivalents of 1 for a cow (either by herself or with an unweaned calf), 0.7 for a yearling of the genus Bos, 1.5 for a bull, 1.25 for a horse, 0.2 for a sheep, 0.2 for a llama, and 0.1 for an alpaca.
- With regard to grazing permits on Navajo partitioned lands, "Animal Unit (AU) means one adult cow and her 6-month-old calf or the equivalent thereof based on comparable forage consumption. Thus as defined in the following: (1) One adult sheep or goat is equivalent to one-fifth (0.20) of an AU; (2) One adult horse, mule, or burro is equivalent to one and one quarter (1.25) AU; or (3) One adult llama is equivalent to three-fifths (0.60) of an AU."
- In relation to environmental assessments for certain actions under US Agriculture regulations, "The term animal unit means a unit of measurement for any animal feeding operation calculated by adding the following numbers: the number of slaughter and feeder cattle multiplied by 1.0, plus the number of mature dairy cattle multiplied by 1.4, plus the number of swine weighing over 25 kilograms (approximately 55 pounds) multiplied by 0.4, plus the number of sheep multiplied by 0.1, plus the number of horses multiplied by 2.0."
- With regard to swine in the State of Idaho, "animal unit" is "a unit of measurement equaling two and one-half (2 1/2) swine, each weighing over twenty-five (25) kilograms (approximately fifty-five (55) pounds), or ten (10) weaned swine, each weighing under twenty-five (25) kilograms. Total animal units are calculated by adding the number of swine weighing over twenty-five (25) kilograms (approximately fifty-five (55) pounds) multiplied by four-tenths (.4), plus the number of weaned swine weighing under twenty-five (25) kilograms multiplied by one-tenth (.1)."
- According to an ordinance in the Township of Brady, Michigan, an "animal unit shall be construed as a unit of measure used to compare relative differences in the odor producing characteristics of animal wastes, with the following equivalencies applicable to various animals: A. Cattle: 1.00, B. Horses: 1.00, C. Swine: 1.00, D. Sheep/Goats 0.50, E. Poultry/Fowl 0.10. The equivalency for types of livestock not specifically listed above shall be the stated equivalency for the type of animal which is most similar in terms of odor producing characteristics of animal wastes, as determined, if necessary, by the Zoning Board of Appeals."

== Other ==
Special definitions exist for various other applications. For example, for purposes of comparing manure nitrogen and phosphorus contents and manure production for various animal species, the US Natural Resources Conservation Service has used 1000-pound animal units, regardless of animal species.

== See also ==
- Livestock grazing comparison – Measure of the number of livestock in relation to the area used for them
- Spherical cow – Humorous concept in scientific models
