= Estray =

Domestic animal that has strayed from the owner's property

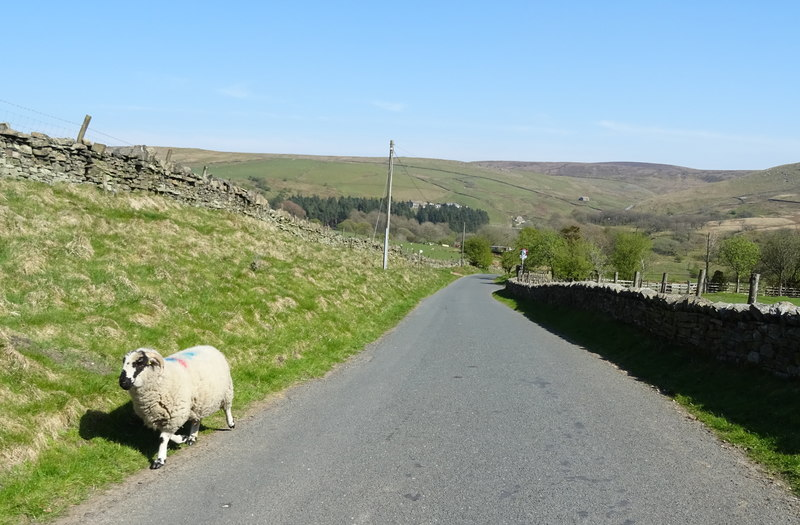
A stray sheep on a road in Lancashire, England

Estray, in common law, is any domestic animal found wandering at large or lost, particularly if its owner is unknown. In most cases, this implies domesticated animals rather than pets.

Under early English common law, estrays were forfeited to the king or lord of the manor; under modern statutes, provision is made for taking up stray animals and acquiring either title to them or a lien for the expenses incurred in keeping them. A person taking up an estray has a qualified ownership in it, which becomes absolute if the owner fails to claim the animal within the statutory time limit. Whether the animal escaped through the owner's negligence or through the wrongful act of a third person is immaterial. If the owner reclaims the estray, they are liable for reasonable costs of its upkeep. The use of an estray during the period of qualified ownership, other than for its own preservation or for the benefit of the owner, is not authorized. Some statutes limit the right to take up estrays to certain classes of persons, to certain seasons or places, or to animals requiring care.

When public officials, such as a county sheriff impound stray animals, they may sell them at auction to recover the costs of upkeep, with proceeds, if any, going into the public treasury. In some places, an uncastrated male livestock animal running at large may be neutered at the owner's expense.

In the United States, it is common for there to be a required "Notice of Estray" sworn and filed in a local office. The process usually takes a prescribed time to permit the property owner to collect his property. Otherwise, the finder obtains title to the property.

ESTRAYS

1 Definition. There is no strictly accurate definition of an estray to be found in any reported decision but from all of them may be deduced the following: An estray is an animal, by nature tame and reclaimable, having a value as property generally recognized by law, as a sheep, ox, hog, or horse, which is found wandering and the owner of which is unknown. Animals on which the law sets no value as a dog or cat and animals ferae naturae as a bear or wolf cannot be considered as estrays.

2 Right to Forfeit. a. At Common Law The right to forfeit the title of the owner to estrays has been recognized from a very remote period. At the common law they were originally forfeited to the king as the general owner and lord paramount of the soil; and later they most commonly belonged to the lord of the manor by special grant from the crown.

— From The American and English Encyclopaedia Law and Practice, 1910, Vol. III, p. 1030

== See also ==
- Abandoned pets
- Feral
- Maverick (animal)
- Waif and stray
- Rabies
- Stray cattle in India
