= List of North American horse breeds =

This is a list of horse breeds usually considered to originate or have developed in Canada and the United States. Some may have complex or obscure histories, so inclusion here does not necessarily imply that a breed is predominantly or exclusively from those countries.

Name	Other names	Notes	Image
Alberta Wild Horse			
American Bashkir Curly	American Curly Horse; North American Curly Horse		
American Belgian Draft			
American Cream Draft			
American Crème Horse	American White and American Creme Horse		
American Drum Horse		A pinto-colored draft‑type cross of Clydesdale, Shire and Gypsy horses.	
American Indian Horse			
American Miniature Horse			
American Paint Horse	Paint Horse		
American Quarter Horse	Quarter Horse		
American Saddlebred			
American Shetland Pony			
American Sorraia Mustang		Of Iberian origin, in the Colonial Spanish horse group; no connection to the Sorraia has been demonstrated	
American Spotted			
American Spotted Paso			
American Thoroughbred	Thoroughbred	Derives directly from the British Thoroughbred; some lines and some coat colors would not be eligible for registration in the General Stud Book	
American Walking Pony			
American Warmblood			
Appaloosa			
Baca-Chica			
Banker			
Blazer		Modern breed of riding horse, bred particularly for ranch work; developed by Neil Hinck of Star, Idaho, from a single foundation stallion named Little Blaze.	
Camarillo White Horse			
Canadian			
Canadian Pacer			
Canadian Pinto			
Canadian Rustic Pony			
Canadian Sport Horse			
Canadian Warmblood			
Carolina Marsh Tacky	Marsh Tacky		
Cerbat Mustang			
Cherokee Horse			
Chickasaw		The original Chickasaw horses are extinct; Florida Cracker horses are occasionally called Chickasaw horses.	
Chincoteague Pony	Assateague Horse		
Choctaw Horse			
Colonial Spanish			
Colorado Ranger			
Conestoga Horse		Extinct.	
Cumberland Island Horse			
Florida Cracker Horse			
Galiceño			
Kanata Pony			
Kentucky Mountain Saddle Horse			
Kiger Mustang			
Lac La Croix Indian Pony	Lac La Croix Pony; Lac La Croix Indigenous Pony; Ojibwe Pony		
Missouri Fox Trotter			
Morab			
Morgan			
Morocco Spotted			
Mountain Pleasure Horse			
Moyle		Ranch and endurance horse, bred in Utah by Rex Moyle from Colonial Spanish and Cleveland Bay stock	
Mustang	American Mustang		
Narragansett Pacer		Extinct.	
National Show Horse			
Nemaiah Valley Horse			
Newfoundland Pony			
Nez Perce Horse			
Nokota			
North American Sportpony	American Sport Pony		
Pony of the Americas	Appaloosa Pony		
Pryor Mountain Mustang	Pryor Mountain		
Puerto Rican Paso Fino			
Quarab			
Quarter Pony			
Racking Horse			
Rocky Mountain Horse			
Sable Island Pony			
Santa Cruz			
Single-footing Horse	North American Single-footing Horse	An open register for horses that perform a rack rather than a trot	
Spanish Jennet Horse			
Spanish Barb		The Spanish Barb Breeders Association is a registry for Colonial Spanish horses; eligible horses stand 140–150 cm and may be of any color	
Spanish Mustang			
Spanish Norman			
Spotted Saddle Horse	National Spotted Saddle Horse		
Standardbred	American Standardbred; American Trotter		
Sulphur			
Tennessee Walking Horse			
Tiger Horse		A gaited, leopard-spotted riding horse, bred from Appaloosa, Paso Fino and Colonial Spanish stock; height 147–152 cm	
Virginia Highlander			
Walkaloosa		derives from Tennessee Walking Horse and Appaloosa, displays leopard spots and ambling gait	
Welara			
Wilbur-Cruce			
