= List of Bureau of Land Management Herd Management Areas =

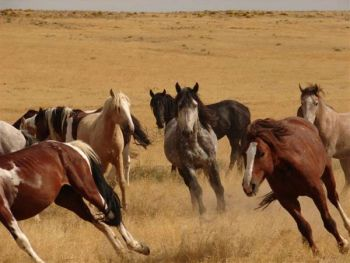
Mustangs on the Saylor Creek HMA, Idaho

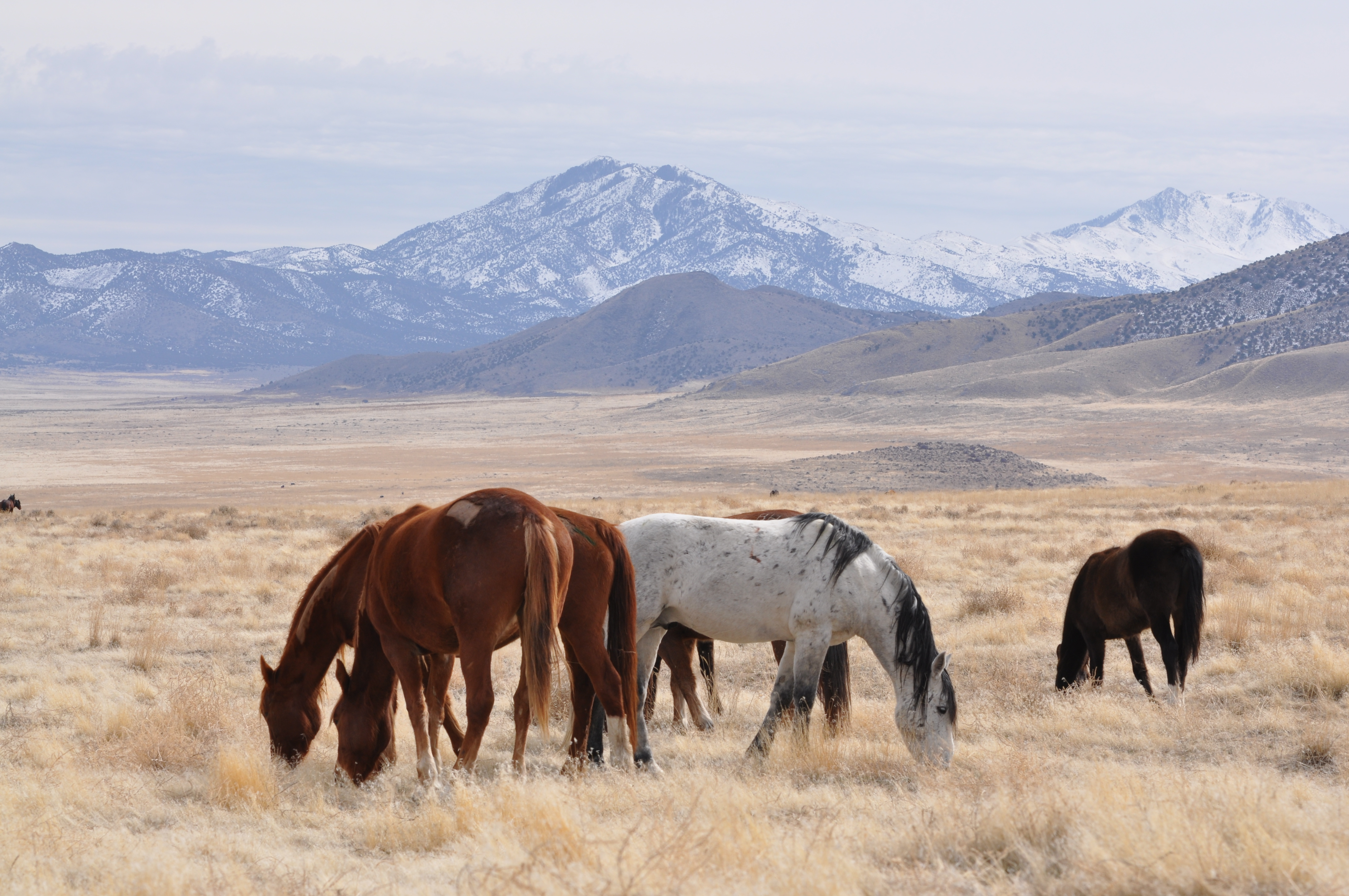
Wild horses at the Onaqui Mountains HMA in Utah

Herd Management Areas (HMA) are lands under the supervision of the United States Bureau of Land Management (BLM) that are managed for the primary but not exclusive benefit of free-roaming wild horses and burros. While these animals are technically feral equines descended from foundation stock that was originally domesticated, the phrase "wild horse" (and wild burro) has a specific meaning in United States law, giving special legal status to the descendants of equines that were "unmarked and unclaimed" on public lands at the time the Wild and Free-Roaming Horses and Burros Act of 1971 (WFRHBA) was passed. Horses that escaped or strayed from other places onto public lands after December 15, 1971, did not automatically become protected "wild horses". In 1971, free-roaming horses and burros were found on 53,800,000 acres (21,800,000 ha) of federal land. Today there are approximately 270 HMAs across 10 states, comprising 31,600,000 acres (12,800,000 ha). Additional herd areas (HAs) had free-roaming horse or burro populations at the time the Act was passed and some still have horse or burro populations today, but unlike the HMAs, they are not managed for the benefit of equines. In addition, some free-roaming equines protected under the WFRHBA are found on lands managed by the National Park Service (NPS), and United States Forest Service (USFS), where they are called wild horse territories (WHT). The BLM sometimes manages equine populations for other federal agencies, the USFS manages some of its own WHTs, and sometimes the agencies administer these areas jointly.

Equine population estimates in each HMA can vary significantly from year to year, depending on habitat condition in a given area, fecundity of the animals, or if a gather has occurred. Census-gathering methods also vary, and wild horse advocacy groups frequently question the validity of the population counts. Nonetheless, each HMA is given an Appropriate Management Level (AML), usually given as a range showing upper and lower limits. This is the BLM's assessment of the number of equines the land can sustain. When the population gets too high, some animals are removed and placed for adoption with private owners or sent to long-term holding facilities elsewhere. Since 1971, about 220,000 horses and burros have been adopted through the BLM.

The original feral horse herds in the Americas were of Spanish horse ancestry. Additional stock brought by eastern settlers moving west, ranging from draft horses to Arabians and Thoroughbreds, added a variety of other horse types. Today, a few populations retain relatively pure Spanish type, but most are a mixture of bloodlines. Some herds have had DNA testing to determine their ancestry. (Note: Herds which have had DNA testing are generally noted in the herd descriptions for each HMA)

== Description ==
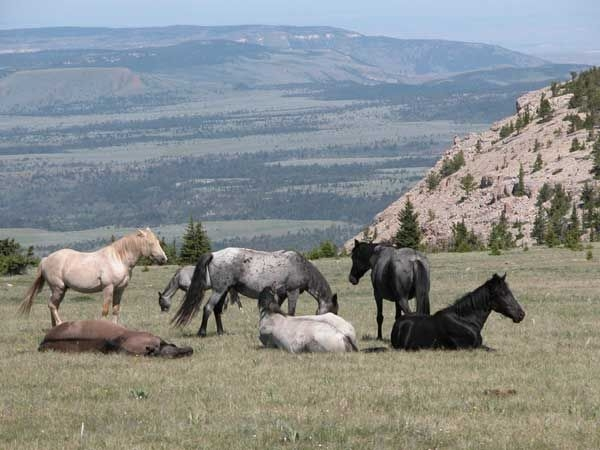
Horses on the Pryor Mountains Wild Horse Range in Montana

The BLM distinguishes between "herd areas" (HA) where feral horse and burro herds existed at the time of the passage of the Wild and Free-Roaming Horses and Burros Act of 1971, and "Herd Management Areas" (HMA) where the land is currently managed for the benefit of horses and burros, though "as a component" of public lands, part of multiple use management, and thus not exclusively as equine habitat. When the 1971 Act was passed, the BLM assessed herd areas to determine which places could become HMAs based on whether they had adequate food, water, cover, and space to "sustain healthy and diverse wild horse and burro populations over the long-term". Some herd areas still contain feral horses or burros but for a number of reasons—including size of herd, habitat, and land ownership—they are not currently managed for equines by the BLM. Additional wild, free-roaming horses and burros are found on Wild Horse and Burro Territories in six states under the auspices of the United States Forest Service (USFS) and are also protected by the Act. Some of the USFS territories are managed in cooperation with the BLM. The USFS has about 50 Wild Horse and Burro Territories. There are also some protected free-roaming equine populations found on lands governed by the National Park Service (NPS).

Today there are approximately 270 separate HMAs across 10 states. In 1971, free-roaming horses were found on 53.8 million acres of federal land, designated as herd areas. From this land base, 31.6 million acres became HMAs, of which 26.9 million acres are managed by the BLM. In addition, some herd areas still are identified as having free-roaming horse populations.

Several laws and specific regulations govern the management of free-roaming horses and burros on federal lands, both those managed by the BLM and those managed by the USFS. These include the Wild Horse Protection Act of 1959, the Wild and Free-Roaming Horses and Burros Act of 1971, as amended by the Federal Land Policy and Management Act of 1976 and the Public Rangelands Improvement Act of 1978. The United States Code of Federal Regulations (CFR) addresses management of wild free-roaming horses and burros at 36 CFR 222 Subpart B.

Though population numbers in individual HMAs vary significantly from year to year, the total population of free-roaming horses overall exceeds the target population that the BLM considers to be the appropriate management level. Horses can eat close to their weight in forage in a month, and in some areas, such as the very arid climate of Nevada, it can take 20 acres (8.1 ha) or more to sustain one horse for one month. 2013 population counts of horse numbers under the management of the BLM estimated there were over 33,000 horses located on Herd Management Areas. There were also approximately 6,800 burros under BLM management. as of March 1, 2014 the BLM estimated a total of 49,209 horses and burros were roaming free on BLM-managed lands. Though the 2015 AML maximum was set at 26,715, in 2016, that total was 55,311 horses and 11,716 burros. Over half of all the free-roaming horses and burros under the management of the BLM live in Nevada, where there are 83 separate HMAs.

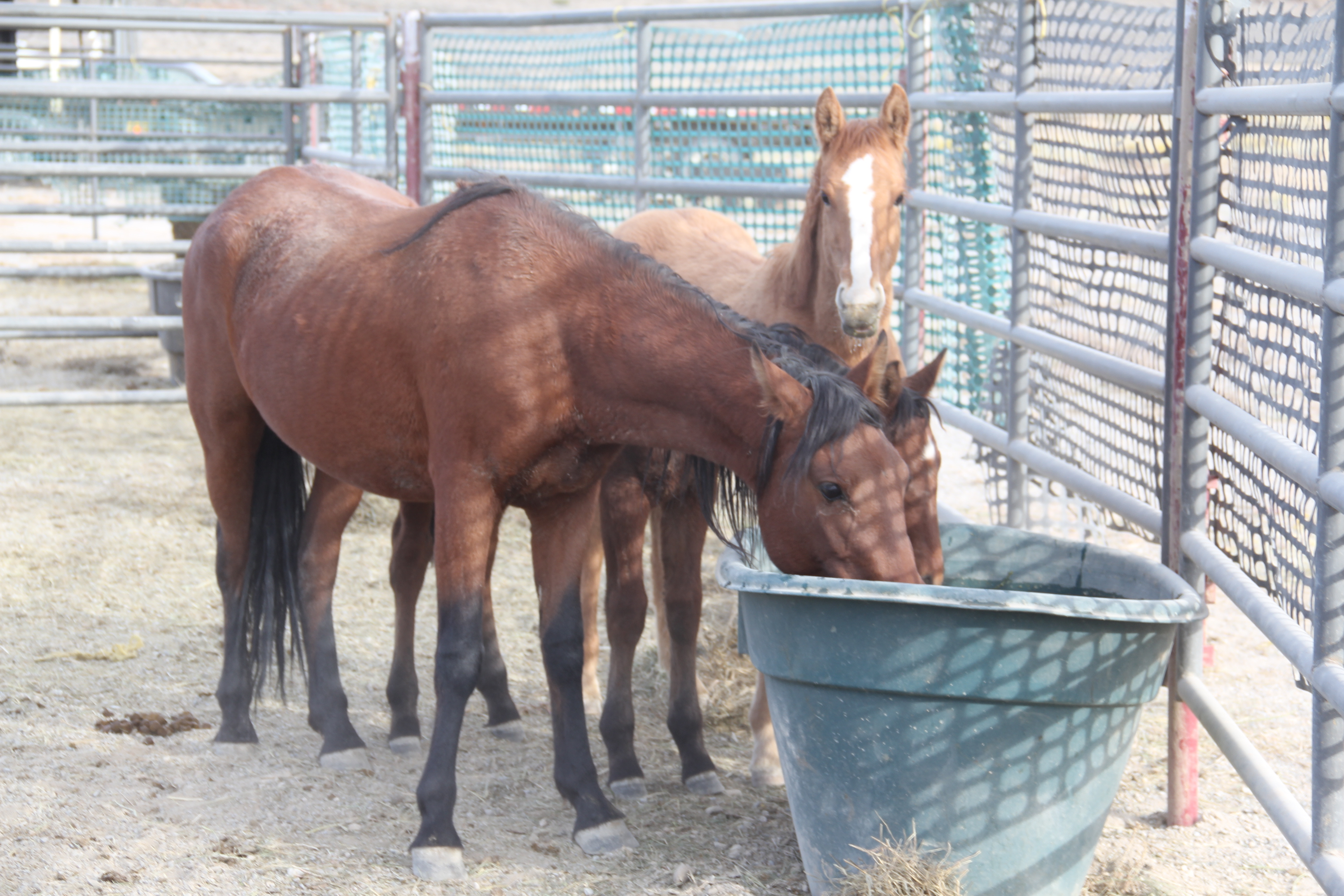
Excess horses are moved to temporary and long-term holding facilities

Population of free-ranging horses is a concern because, unlike wildlife or livestock, horses are not hunted, do not face significant natural predators, nor are their numbers human-controlled by means of grazing permits. Without population control, their numbers can double every four years. With current management practices, numbers currently are increasing by about 15% to 18% each year. As of 2014, 48,447 equines that had been captured, removed from the range were kept in holding facilities in various locations throughout the west and midwest. Many of these excess animals are eligible to be placed for "adoption" with private owners. Since 1971, about 220,000 horses and burros have been adopted through the BLM. In the early 2000s, about 8,000 horses a year were adopted, but at present, there are only about 2,500 horses adopted each year. The BLM attributes this to changing economic conditions. Of those remaining in the wild, as of 2016, the estimated 67,027 horses and burros are two and a half times the population in 1971 when the Act was passed and about twice the recommended Appropriate Management Level (AML). Besides removal of about 3,500 animals in 2016 to long-term holding facilities and adoption, the BLM hopes to use fertility control and other tools to reduce numbers of horses on the range.

== Summaries of population by state ==
| State | Comment | HMAs | HMA acres | Pop. horses (Note: Numbers vary from year to year. Not all states separate AML for horses and burros) | Pop. burros | Total | AML | Ref. | Image |
|---|---|---|---|---|---|---|---|---|---|
| Arizona | Arizona manages the largest free-roaming burro population in the country. Two Arizona HMAs are for horses, the other seven are for burros, though some burro HMAs have been depopulated and contain no burros at present. | 9 HMAs, 2 USFS territories | 2,296,269 acres (929,267 ha) | 318 | 5,317 | 5,635 | 1,676 | | Three horses standing in an open area |
| California | State HMAs include horses descended from ranch estrays, cavalry remounts, Spanish type, and draft types in a few areas, some HMAs have burro populations | 22 HMAs, 8 USFS territories | 2,533,722 acres (1,025,361 ha) | 4,925; AML 1,756 horses | 3,391 | 8,316 | 2,200 | | two horses in the distance of a field, shown at sunset |
| Colorado | Colorado adopts about 150 horses and burros a year, runs the Wild Horse Inmate Program (WHIP) to pair prison inmates with Mustangs to train for adoption. Has about 1,000 animals available for adoption at any given time. | 4 HMAs | 404,013 acres (163,498 ha) | 1,530 | 0 | 1,530 | 812 | | a horse standing on a hill with mountains in the background |
| Idaho | "Idaho's wild horses are descendants of domestic horses that escaped to or were turned out on the public lands prior to passage of the Horse and Burro Act in 1971." Several HMAs contain animals with known descent from Thoroughbred and Quarter Horse stallions turned out in the area. | 6 HMAS | 418,268 acres (169,267 ha) | 468 | 0 | 468 | 617 | | a gray horse galloping up an incline with large boulders in the background |
| Montana | The Pryor Range was originally set aside as a wild horse refuge in 1968, expanded after 1971. BLM partners with the Pryor Mountain Wild Mustang Center located in Lovell, Wyoming. Range has a 100% adoption rate | 1 HMA | 33,187 acres (13,430 ha) | 160 | 0 | 160 | 120 | | a slightly thin but healthy bay horse grazing on grass |
| Nevada | Nevada holds just under half of the wild horses and burros managed by the BLM and just under half of the total acreage in the United States managed as HMAs. As of 2013, total population is 20,195 with an AML of 12,700, totals are for horses and burros combined) | 83 HMAs, 24 USFS territories | 15,718,630 acres (6,361,100 ha) | 31,979 | 2,552 | 34,351 | 12,811 | | a dark-colored horse walking through sagebrush |
| New Mexico | BLM Region also manages the regional holding facility in Pauls Valley, Oklahoma. New Mexico has additional free-ranging horses on several Forest Service Wild Horse and Burro territories. | 2 HMAs, 11 USFS territories | 28,613 acres (11,579 ha) | 175 | 0 | 175 | 83 | | about 10 horses grazing on a hill covered with sage and juniper |
| Oregon | Three to five herds are gathered each year, Oregon is home to the Kiger Mustang | 17 HMAs, 2 USFS territories | 2,978,571 acres (1,205,385 ha) | 3,785 | 56 | 3,841 | 2,715 | | two horses standing on a sagebrush-covered hill |
| Utah | Two HMAs are also managed for burros. Numbers within each HMA vary from 35 to over 400. | 20 HMAs, 2 USFS territories | 2,451,227 acres (991,976 ha) | 5,440 | 400 | 5,840 | 1,956 | | a large herd of horses running across a dry prairie |
| Wyoming | HMAs managed by Wyoming BLM exclude the Pryor Range, which is managed by BLM in Montana | 16 HMAs | 4,768,682 acres (1,929,817 ha) | 6,535 | 0 | 6,535 | 3,725 | | Four or five horses moving across a prairie with sagebrush in the foreground and mountains in the background |
| Totals | Total population does not include horses kept in long-term holding facilities | 270 HMAs, 49 USFS territories | 31,631,362 acres (12,800,758 ha) | 55,311 | 11,716 | 67,027 | 26,715 | | |

== List of HMAs ==
Actual population numbers vary widely from year to year, but often the numbers exceed the AML for a given herd management area. The AML for each range usually has an upper and a lower limit. Types of horses range widely in size, coat color, conformation and historic origins, from horses tracing to Colonial Spanish Horse origins to horses descended from locally escaped ranch and farm stock well into the mid-20th century. Many burro herds descend from animals strayed from mining operations. (Note: See individual listings for details)

HMAs that cross state boundaries are included with the state which administers the HMA. The number of areas listed below does not equal 270 for several reasons: First, some herd areas still contain free-roaming horse and/or burro populations and are included in the BLM lists. Second, some USFS wild horse territories are listed by the BLM because they managed under a cooperative agreement, particularly those where USFS and BLM land are adjacent and the same herd crosses into both areas. Third, some HMAs are contiguous and/or jointly administered as a single unit; some of these also may cross state lines, (Note: Examples include Havasu in Arizona, Chemehuevi in California, Douglas in Colorado, The Little Humboldt/Little Osyhee complex in Nevada, and others.) and finally, BLM records vary annually; changing conditions or planned management decisions may remove animals altogether, land swaps and management decisions may transfer land between federal agencies or into private ownership, some areas move from HMA to HA status. (Note: See, e.g. changes between 2005 and 2015.)

=== Arizona ===
List of HMAs in Arizona
| Name | Herd description | State | Type(s) | Pop./AML | Ref. |
|---|---|---|---|---|---|
| Alamo | Descendants of burros abandoned by early prospectors, miners and local rangers. Origins of North African ancestry | AZ | burro | AML 128–160 | |
| Big Sandy HMA | Brought by miners in the 1860s, more brought by farmers in the 1870s to breed mules. | AZ | burro | AML 111–139 | |
| Black Mountain HMA (AZ) | Descendants of burros brought by miners in the 1860s. Origins of North African ancestry. Population has been as high as 2,000. Currently about 90 animals per year are removed | AZ | burro | AML 382–478 | |
| Cerbat | Spanish type, origins disputed. May descend from Spanish mustangs, introduced as early as the 1500s. May also have origins from estrays from explorers in the 1700s or animals abandoned by livestock ranchers in the early 1800s. | AZ | horse | AML 72–90 | |
| Cibola-Trigo | Horses of mixed type, probably descended from estray ranch horses circa 1940, includes individuals of Appaloosa type, possibly descended from a known Appaloosa stallion. Burros probably arrived with miners in the mid-1800s. | AZ/ CA (Note: Managed by BLM in Arizona.) | horse burro | AML 120 horses, 285 burros | |
| Harquahala HA | Herd area not managed for wild equines. Burros descended from pack animals brought to the area in the late 1800s. Originally were to be removed after the 1971 Act was passed, but no funding was provided and today the land is managed to incorporate burros on the land, which is designated as a Special Botanical Area owing to diverse vegetation. | AZ | burro | 153 | |
| Havasu HMA | Arrived with miners about 1858, abandoned as railroads came into the area. Nubian wild ass and Somali wild ass characteristics. Adjacent to Chemehuevi HMA in California and close to Lake Havasu HMA in Nevada | AZ/ CA (Note: managed by Arizona BLM) | burro | AML 133–166 | |
| Lake Pleasant | Descended from small pack burros escaped or released in the 1880s and 1890s. | AZ | burro | 476/AML 166–208 | |
| Little Harquahala HA | Herd area not managed for wild equines. Abandoned burros in late 1800s formed a free-roaming population but due to assorted issue regarding habitat and conflicts with private landowners, land use plans in the early 1980s prescribed a "zero population" area and all burros have been removed. | AZ | burro | 0 | |
| Painted Rock HA | Herd area not managed for wild equines. Burros descended from pack and work animals brought into the desert in the late 1800s. Tend to be gray, refined structure. Probable North African ancestry | AZ | burro | 6 | |
| Tassi-Gold Butte HA | Burros arrived with miners, sheepherders and cattlemen in the late 1800s. Land use planning prescribed the Tassi section as a "zero population" area and all burros were removed, though a 2005 census noted 10 animals. | AZ/ CA | burro | 58 | |

=== California ===
List of HMAs in California
| Name | Herd description | State | Type(s) | Pop./AML | Ref. |
|---|---|---|---|---|---|
| Bitner | Horses believed to have originated from area ranches, colors mostly blacks and bays, some piebald | CA | horse | AML 15–25 | |
| Buckhorn | Spanish origins originally with additions of ranch stock and strong influence of U.S. Cavalry horses from World War I era. | CA/ NV | horse | 59–85 | |
| Carter Reservoir | Spanish phenotype, including many dun horses with primitive markings. | CA/ NV (Note: Most land in Nevada but managed by California BLM) | horse | 25–35 | |
| Centennial | Horses are believed to descend from abandoned or escaped ranch stock. Most are bay or gray, ranging from 14 to 16 hands (56 to 64 inches, 142 to 163 cm) and weighing 900–1,100 pounds (410–500 kg). The herd management area also had a 2015 population of 426 burros, even though the AML is zero. Some animals stray onto the China Lake Naval Air Weapons Station. | CA | horse burro | AML 134–168 horses, 0 burros | |
| Chemehuevi | Burros descended from those brought by miners during the 1800s then later abandoned. Adjacent to Havasu HMA in Arizona and Lake Havasu HMA in Nevada, and animals migrate between these areas. | CA | burro | AML 97–108 | |
| Chicago Valley | Light saddle horse type, believed to have originated from area ranches | CA | horse | AML 10–12 | |
| Chocolate–Mule Mountains HMA | Burros descended from those brought by miners during the 1800s then later abandoned. | AZ/ CA (Note: Managed by California BLM) | burro | AML 109–133 | |
| Clark Mountain HA | Herd area not managed for a wild equine population | CA | burro | 150 | |
| Coppersmith | Horses originally of Spanish heritage diluted with ranch stock and US Cavalry remounts. Many have phenotypes that resemble Morgans and Quarter Horses. | CA | horse | 50–75 horses | |
| Dead Mountain HA | Burros live in this herd area, but it is not managed for a wild equine population. | CA | burro | 85/AML 0 | |
| Devils Garden Wild Horse Territory/Round Mountain HMA | Mixed draft horse and light breed types in a wide variety of colors. Area managed by the United States Forest Service, BLM manages gathers and adoption. Horses with draft horse characteristics may be up to 1,300 pounds (590 kg), others areas are dominated by animals with light horse breed characteristics averaging 15–16 hands (60–64 inches, 152–163 cm) and 900–1,200 pounds (410–540 kg) pounds, thought to have descended from horses used on area farms and ranches. The acreage managed by the BLM is called Round Mountain. | CA | horse | 206–402 USFS, 8–10 BLM | |
| Fort Sage | Estray farm and ranch horse ancestry, HMA is in both Nevada and California but is managed by California BLM | CA/ NV (Note: Administered by California) | horse | AML max 29 CA, 36 NV | |
| Fox Hog | Mixed light and draft types, some with draft horse characteristics. HMA is in both Nevada and California but is managed by California BLM | CA/ NV | horse | 120–220 | |
| High Rock | Spanish type. Two ranges, East Canyon Home Range and Little High Rock Home Range, managed as one unit but with separate AMLs. Some of the horses in this herd exhibit Spanish Mustang characteristics. | NV (Note: Wholly within Nevada, but California-managed) | horse | 30 to 40; East Canyon; 48 to 80; Little High Rock | |
| Lee Flat | Small, gray burros descended from those left behind by miners | CA | burro | 15 | |
| Massacre Lakes | Horses believed to descend from estray ranch stock | CA | horse | 25–45 | |
| New Ravendale | Estray horses of both light ranch stock and draft type | CA | horse | 25 | |
| Nut Mountain | Also called Pine Nut Mountain, horses are 13 to 14 hands (52 to 56 inches, 132 to 142 cm) high and nearly all coat colors have been observed, including black, bay and pinto. Horses are descended from estrayed ranch stock, some pintos as well as black and bay colors. | NV (Note: Wholly within Nevada but administered by California) | horse | AML 30–55 | |
| Palm Canyon | Estray ranch stock. This area is described as a HMA in some BLM documents but as a HA in others. | CA | horse burro | 6 horses 14 burros | |
| Panamint HA | Burros live in this herd area, which is not managed for a wild equine population | CA | burro | 69 | |
| Piper Mountain | Estrays from ranch horse stock and abandoned miners' burros | CA | horse burro | 17 horses, 82 burros | |
| Piute Mountain HA | Herd area not managed for a wild equine population | CA | burro | 22 | |
| Red Rock Lakes HMA | Spanish mustang ancestry diluted by other horse types brought in by ranchers | CA | horse | 25 | |
| Slate Range HA | Herd area not managed for a wild equine population. Population grew from 66 to 277 burros from 2005 to 2015 | CA | burro | 277 | |
| Twin Peaks | Horses originally of Spanish heritage diluted with ranch stock and US Cavalry remounts. Burros from sheepherding operations. Occasionally a few mules are produced due to intermingling of horse and burro herds. | CA | horse burro | 448–758 horses 72–116 burros | |
| Wall Canyon | Horses are believed to descend from ranch stock. Most are dark, solid-colored horses, but there are a few that are piebald. Height ranges from 14 to 16 hands (56 to 64 inches, 142 to 163 cm) and weight from 900 to 1,100 pounds (410 to 500 kg). Most land is in Nevada but the HMA is managed by California | CA/ NV | horse | 15–25 | |
| Waucoba-Hunter Mountain | Small burros thought to have descended from abandoned miners' animals, possibly supplemented by estrays from sheepherding operations | CA | burro | 11 | |

=== Colorado ===
List of HMAs in Colorado
| Name | Herd description | State | Type(s) | Pop./AML | Ref. |
|---|---|---|---|---|---|
| Little Book Cliffs Wild Horse Range | One of only three areas in the United States specifically designated as a wild horse range. At 3- to 4-year intervals, between 20 and 60 horses are rounded up and removed from the range to be adopted | CO | horse | 90–150 | |
| Piceance/East Douglas Creek HMA | Consists of Douglas Creek and Piceance Basin, administratively linked with the West Douglas Herd Area, all adjacent to one another. Genetic analysis showed ancestry most similar to gaited, racing and light riding breeds of domestic horse, a bit of genetic similarity to some old world pony and draft breeds. North Piceance HA contains a small number of horses (Note: 8 in 2005) | CO | horse | AML 135–235 | |
| Sandwash Basin | Wide variety of coat colors, DNA studies show greatest genetic similarity to Spanish/Iberian horse breeds, some gaited horse genes and other ancestry similar to domestic, North American breeds, plus some Arabian blood. | CO | horse | AML 163–363 | |
| Spring Creek Basin | Small, about 14 hands (56 inches, 142 cm), originated from ranch stock that arrived In the late 1800s, later used for cavalry mounts until about 1940 when almost all horses were removed from the range, the remnants becoming the ancestors of the present day herd. | CO | horse | AML 35–65 | |
| West Douglas Creek HA | Herd area not managed for equines, had a horse population of 97 in 2005 and 193 in 2015 | CO | horse | 0 | |

=== Idaho ===
List of HMAs in Idaho
| Name | Herd description | State | Type(s) | Pop./AML | Ref. |
|---|---|---|---|---|---|
| Black Mountain (Owyhee ID) | Mixed light saddle type. Some feral horses in Idaho descend from animals turned loose during the Great Depression of the 1930s by local farmers and ranchers. This HMA has horses of good size and conformation due to having released Thoroughbred and Quarter Horse stallions into the herds until 1978. Cavalry remounts also may have been an influence. Wide variety of coat colors, including dun, pinto and Appaloosa. | ID | horse | AML 30–60 | |
| Challis | Mixed origins and significant genetic variation in the herd, but overall larger than most wild horses. Size 14–16 hands (56–64 inches, 142–163 cm) and 900–1,000 pounds (410–450 kg). Original stock probably brought into the area about 1870 by miners and ranchers. Domesticated stallions and several breeds of work horses were released into the area. A 2002 study indicated genetic influence from New World Spanish and North American gaited horses. A dendrogram also indicated influence by draft horse and pony genes. | ID | horse | AML 185–253 | |
| Four Mile (ID) | Mixed light saddle type. This HMA has horses of good size and conformation due to Thoroughbred and Quarter Horse stallions having been released into the herds until 1978. Cavalry remounts also may have been an influence. Wide variety of coat colors, including dun, pinto and Appaloosa. | ID | horse | AML 37–60 | |
| Hardtrigger (Owyhee) | Mixed light saddle type. The BLM considers the horses managed in this area to be of high quality with good size and conformation due to having released Thoroughbred and Quarter Horse stallions into the herds until 1978. Cavalry remounts also may have been an influence. Wide variety of coat colors, including dun, pinto and Appaloosa. | ID | horse | AML 66–130 | |
| Sands Basin (Owyhee) | Following an emergency gather in 2015 due to wildfire, population dropped to six horses, but was expected to return to AML. | ID | horse | AML 33–64 | |
| Saylor Creek | Mixed light saddle type. Wide range of colors, 14–16 hands (56–64 inches, 142–163 cm), 900–1,000 pounds (410–450 kg) Herd originated from mares from Challis area captured by Mustangers and brought to the area in the early 1960s. A privately owned "registered" stallion was turned loose with the mares and the foals captured in annual roundups until passage of the 1971 Act. | ID | horse | AML 40–50 | |

=== Montana ===
List of HMAs in Montana
| Name | Herd description | State | Type(s) | Pop./AML | Ref. |
|---|---|---|---|---|---|
| Pryor Mountains Wild Horse Range | Colonial Spanish horse type, averaging 14 hands (56 inches, 142 cm), compact, often dun-colored with primitive markings. This HMA began prior to the WFRHBA as a Wild Horse Range created through Secretarial Order in 1968 for the "protection and management of wild horses, wildlife, watershed, and recreation, archaeological and scenic values". The range falls within the jurisdiction of the BLM, USFS, and National Park Service. | MT/ WY (Note: Crosses state line. Managed by Montana BLM, tourism headquarters in Wyoming.) | horse | AML 90–120 | |

=== Nevada ===
List of HMAs in Nevada
| Name | Herd description | State | Type(s) | Pop./AML | Ref. |
|---|---|---|---|---|---|
| Amargosa Valley HMA | No current population | NV | horse | 0 | |
| Antelope | Antelope and Antelope Valley are a combined HMA complex. Army Remount Service added Morgan, Thoroughbred and some draft stallions to local feral stock between 1900 and 1940. Horses in this HMA are noted for hardiness and soundness. | NV | horse | AML 324 | |
| Antelope Valley | At the time of the 1971 Act, local ranchers ran domestic horses of Standardbred and American Quarter Horse bloodlines on the range but were unable to capture all of them. Remaining strays joined existing feral herds, creating mixed bloodlines. Horses currently average 14.2 to 15 hands (58 to 60 inches, 147 to 152 cm). | NV | horse | AML 259 | |
| Applewhite HA | Wild horses move through this area but it cannot sustain a viable herd. Herds from the Delamar Mountains HMA occasionally use this area, which has had a horse population since livestock first arrived in this part of Nevada, and local ranchers had grazing allotments for horses until 1974. Horses in the area descend from ranch and mining stock and cavalry remounts. Horses have characteristics of both light saddle horse breeds and draft horses. Horses are small, 13 to 14 hands (52 to 56 inches, 132 to 142 cm), 600 to 800 pounds (270 to 360 kg). | NV | horse | 24 | |
| Ash Meadows | No current population | NV | horse | 0 | |
| Augusta Mountains | Horses in this HMA exhibit a wide range of colors, solid shades predominant, but also a few buckskins, duns, roans and pintos. | NV | horse | AML 308 | |
| Bald Mountain | 25 acres are needed to support one horse for one month in some places. Relatively large horses with a wide range of colors | NV | horse | AML 362 | |
| Black Rock, Black Rock East, Black Rock West | Most horses are descendants of ranch stock, with a wide range of coat colors. Also contains a few Baskir Curly horses, brought into this part of Nevada. | NV | horse | 121–186 | |
| Blue Nose Peak HA | Horses in the area descend from ranch stock and cavalry remounts. Horses have characteristics of both light saddle horse breeds and draft horses. Horses are small, 13 to 14 hands (52 to 56 inches, 132 to 142 cm), 600 to 800 pounds (270 to 360 kg). Mostly solid and dilution colors. Part of a complex that also includes Meadow Valley Mountains and Mormon Mountains HAs. | NV | horse | 12 | |
| Blue Wing Mountains | Horses are mostly descended from ranch stock escaped or released into the area. Burros are descendants of pack animals brought into the area by miners and sheep ranchers. | NV | horse burro | 27–36 horses, 21–28 burros | |
| Buck and Bald HA | Now merged into Triple B HMA. Some horses may be descendants of animals abandoned by the Pony Express. Additional stock may have come from local ranches. Some Army Remount horses may have been added up through the 1930s. Horses are reputed to be sturdy and reliable. Size is 14 to 15 hands (56 to 60 inches, 142 to 152 cm). There are also a few Curly horses in the area. | NV | horse | 0 | |
| Buffalo Hills | Horses descend from escaped ranch stock and cavalry remounts. Most are bay or chestnut | NV | horse | 236–314 | |
| Bullfrog | A small area, 18 miles wide and 14 miles long, suitable for burros but not horses. | NV | horse burro | 204/AML 55–91 | |
| Butte HA | Land area has been made a part of Triple B HMA. Some horses in the area may be descendants of animals abandoned by the Pony Express. Additional stock may have come from local ranches. Some Army Remount horses may have been added up through the 1930s. Horses are reputed to be sturdy and reliable. Size is 14 to 15 hands (56 to 60 inches, 142 to 152 cm). | NV | horse | 0 (merged) | |
| Calico Mountain | Most horses are descendants of ranch stock, with a wide range of coat colors. | NV | horse | 250–333 | |
| Callaghan | Larger horses compared to other herds, 14–15 hands (56–60 inches, 142–152 cm), 900–1,100 pounds (410–500 kg) pounds. Descent is from ranch stock and animals used for transportation and mining. A wide variety of color, including pinto, dun and Appaloosa. Curly horses have also been captured. DNA analysis showed high genetic diversity, including light racing and riding breeds, gaited breeds, Morgan, Spanish and Oriental bloodlines. | NV | horse | AML 134–247 | |
| Cherry Creek HA | Horses may occasionally move into the area from other HMAs, but do not stay. Area has been made part of the Triple B HMA. 103 horses were removed in 1985 and census populations dropped to zero in 1991. Fences now restrict movement from other areas. | NV | horse | 0 (merged) | |
| Clan Alpine | Wide variety of coat colors, height 14 to 15 hands (56 to 60 inches, 142 to 152 cm) | NV | horse | AML 612–979 | |
| Clover Creek HA | Was a HMA, now is a HA. Horses in the area descend from ranch stock and cavalry remounts. Horses have characteristics of both light saddle horse breeds and draft horses. Horses are small, 13 to 14 hands (52 to 56 inches, 132 to 142 cm), 600 to 800 pounds (270 to 360 kg). Mostly solid, roan and dilution colors. | NV | horse | 38 | |
| Clover Mountains HA | Was a HMA, now a HA. Horses in the area descend from ranch stock and cavalry remounts. Horses have characteristics of both light saddle horse breeds and draft horses. Horses are small, 13 to 14 hands (52 to 56 inches, 132 to 142 cm), 600 to 800 pounds (270 to 360 kg). Mostly solid, roan and dilution colors. | NV | horse | 214 | |
| Deer Lodge Canyon HA | Merged into Eagle HMA in 2007. Horses in the area descend from ranch stock and cavalry remounts. Horses have characteristics of both light saddle horse breeds and draft horses. Horses are small, 13 to 14 hands (52 to 56 inches, 132 to 142 cm), 600 to 800 pounds (270 to 360 kg). Mostly solid, roan and dilution colors. | NV | horse | 0 (merged) | |
| Delamar Mountains HA | Horses 13 to 14 hands (52 to 56 inches, 132 to 142 cm), 600 to 800 pounds (270 to 360 kg). Descended from stock escaped from ranchers, miners, settlers, and cavalry remounts. Herd shows descent from American Quarter Horses, Arabians, Thoroughbreds, and draft breeds. | NV | horse | 300 | |
| Desatoya | No detail given on herd characteristics. Merged from the Smith Creek HA | NV | horse | AML 127–180 | |
| Diamond, Diamond Hills North, Diamond Hills South | Horses move freely between the three HMAs of the Diamond complex. Horses have a wide range of colors and types, probably from a mixture of breeds. Local ranchers had grazing leases in this area at the time of the 1971 Act. Any horses on public lands after a claiming period ended were declared wild. Among other light horse breeds, horses in this area include some with American Saddlebred characteristics. Horses were removed from the North HMA following a major fire in 1999. Horses from the Diamond HMAs are reputed to have a quiet disposition. | NV | horse | AML max 210 (151, 36, 22 respectively) | |
| Dogskin Mountains | Horses move between Dogskin and Granite Peak HMAs. Size ranges from 14 to 15 hands (56 to 60 inches, 142 to 152 cm) and horses have strong Morgan horse characteristics. | NV | horse | 100/AML 10–15 | |
| Dry Lake HA | Now part of Silver King HMA. Army Remount Service added Morgan, Thoroughbred and some draft stallions to local feral stock between 1900 and 1940. Reputed to be strong and healthy due to natural selection. | NV | horse | 0 (merged) | |
| Eagle HMA | No detail given on herd characteristics. Created from merge of Deer Lodge Canyon, Fortification, Patterson-Eagle, and Wilson Creek HAs | NV | horse | AML 100–201 | |
| Eldorado Mountains | No current population | NV | horse | 0 | |
| Fish Creek | Origin of Curly horse populations in Nevada was a rancher who brought some to this area in 1874. A few are still found here. Other horses are also in the area and have a wide range of coat colors | NV | horse | AML 180 | |
| Fish Lake Valley | Very dry climate and presence of mountain lions result in low horse population | NV | horse | AML 65 | |
| Flanigan | Horse show some evidence of draft breeding. Most horses were removed after a 1999 fire and re-released after grazing was re-established. | NV | horse | AML 80–124 | |
| Fox Lake | Descended from ranch stock, have a wide range of coat colors. | NV | horse | AML 153–204 | |
| Garfield Flat | No detail given on herd characteristics. | NV | horse | AML 83–125 | |
| Gold Butte | Burros of all colors and types are found in an area with a very harsh, dry climate and few sources of water. | NV | burro | AML 98–100 | |
| Gold Mountain | Good habitat for burros, but poor habitat for horses, which have been periodically gathered from the range beginning in 1996. | NV | horse burro | 15 horses (2005)/AML 0 horses AML 78 burros | |
| Goldfield | Good habitat for burros, but poor habitat for horses, which have been periodically gathered from the range. Forage contains many plants that burros can eat but horses cannot. In 2005 horse AML was 125 but only 4 horses counted; burro AML was 50, but only 17 counted. | NV | horse burro | AML 125 horses AML 50 burros | |
| Goshute | Mostly solid colored horses, including some with cream dilution colors or duns. Small, averaging 14 hands (56 inches, 142 cm). | NV | horse | AML 123 | |
| Granite Peak | No detail given on herd characteristics. | NV | horse | AML 18 | |
| Granite Range | Horses descend from escaped ranch stock and cavalry remounts. Most solid colors are seen, plus a few pintos and Appaloosas. | NV | horse | 193–258 | |
| Hickson Summit HMA | No AML established for horses, but there was a 2005 horse population of 43 and burro population of 66. This area is managed by the USFS | NV | burro | AML 0 horse, 16 burro | |
| Highland Peak HA | Merged into Silver King HMA. Horses in this area survive in a particularly extreme range of temperatures from well below freezing in the winter to over 100 degrees in the summer. They are noted for a large number of horses with flaxen manes and tails, descended from an individual stallion known to have been turned out in the area. Most other horses are also solid colored bays and sorrels. Ancestors were ranch stock and cavalry remounts, with characteristics indicating multiple light horse breeds and some draft blood. Height averages 13 to 14 hands (52 to 56 inches, 132 to 142 cm) and weight 600–800 pounds (270–360 kg). | NV | horse | 0 (merged) | |
| Horse Mountain | No detail given on herd characteristics. | NV | horse | AML 78–118 | |
| Hot Creek | Very dry area with few water sources, horses leave the HMA in the spring and return in the winter; about 74% of the horses actually live outside the HMA boundary. Herd descends from cavalry remounts and are mostly darker solid colors with few white markings. | NV | horse | AML 25–41 | |
| Humboldt HA | This is a Herd Area and not managed for wild horses. Nonetheless, horses remained after a 1985 attempt to capture all of them. Origins are not known, and it is possible that some horses migrated into the area from adjacent HMAs. | NV | horse | 282 | |
| Jackson Mountains | Horses of dark solid colors descended from ranch stock | NV | horse | 130–217 | |
| Jakes Wash HA | Horses in a wide variety of colors and showing influence of many light horse breeds and some possible draft breeds. Most likely descended from ranch stock and possible cavalry remount stallions turned out in the area between 1900 and 1940 to "upgrade" local horses. Was jointly managed with the USFS until 2007, then became a HA in 2008. | NV | horse | 138 | |
| Johnnie HMA | Joint management with the BLM and the US Forest Service. Mojave desert shrub, horses and burros occupy different areas. Last Chance and Mount Sterling HAs merged into this area. | NV | horse burro | 50 horses 50 burros | |
| Kamma Mountains | Part of the Blue Wing Complex, which has a total AML of 553 horses. Population probably descended from ranch stock, Horses are mostly dark solid colors. | NV | horse | 46–77 | |
| Lahontan | Many horses live outside the HMA, which is small and with an AML much smaller than actual area population. The herd is notable for the large percentage of pinto horses, and a wide range of other colors, including dun. Average height is 15 hands (60 inches, 152 cm) and the herd is noted for good conformation and temperament. | NV | horse | 7–10, but over 100 in the area | |
| Lava Beds | Horses descend from ranch stock, mostly dark solid colors but also some duns and buckskins. Burros descend from pack animals left behind by miners and sheep ranchers. Most burros are gray, but a few are pinto. | NV | horse burro | 89–148 horses 10–16 burros | |
| Lake Havasu HMA | Adjacent to the Chemehuevi HMA Area in California and Havasu in Arizona. Burros descend from those abandoned by miners circa 1858. About 90 percent are gray, the rest black, brown, or pinto. Average height is 48 inches (1,200 mm) and weight is 350 pounds (160 kg) | NV | burro | 178 | |
| Little Fish Lake | Horses have a wide range of colors. Area is notable for the James Wild Horse Trap in Little Fish Lake Valley, which is listed on the National Register of Historic Places. Noted western cowboy writer and artist Will James worked in this area in his younger years. | NV | horse | AML 39 | |
| Little Humboldt | Horses are a wide variety of colors and descended from ranch stock. Height is 12 to 14 hands (48 to 56 inches, 122 to 142 cm). Part of the Owyhee Complex HMAs, a contiguous group separated only by fences that includes Owyhee, Rock Creek, and Little Humboldt, Little Owyhee, and Snowstorm. | NV | horse | 23/AML 40–80 | |
| Little Mountain HA | Horses migrate between this HA and Miller Flat HA in search of water. Horses descend from ranch stock and cavalry remounts with characteristics of both light saddle horse breeds and draft horses. Horses are small, of many different colors, averaging 13 to 14 hands (52 to 56 inches, 132 to 142 cm), 600 to 800 pounds (270 to 360 kg). | NV | horse | 28 | |
| Little Owyhee | Horses descend from ranch stock. Most are dark solid colors but there are also palomino, buckskin, pinto, gray, roan and white horses. Part of the Owyhee Complex HMAs, a contiguous group separated only by fences that includes Owyhee, Rock Creek, and Little Humboldt, Little Owyhee, and Snowstorm. | NV | horse | 1097/AML 194–298 | |
| Marietta HMA | No detail given on herd characteristics, managed for burros, but about 70 horses also inhabit the area. | NV | burro | AML 104–230 burros | |
| Maverick-Medicine | Horses of a wide variety of colors are descended from ranch stock | NV | horse | AML 276 | |
| McGee Mountain | Burros are mostly gray in color and are descended from pack animals used by miners and sheep ranchers. There is very little water on this HMA, so the burros move off of the HMA for water. Additional burros live on the adjacent Sheldon National Wildlife Refuge, but not under BLM management. The two populations are separated by a fence at the boundary of the refuge. | NV | burro | AML 26–47 | |
| Meadow Valley Mountain HA | Part of a complex that includes Blue Nose Peak and Mormon Mountains. AML is zero, but horses within the complex descended from ranch stock and cavalry remounts with influences from a wide variety of breeds ranging from Quarter horses, Arabians, Thoroughbreds to draft horses. Mostly horses are bay and sorrel, but the herd also has animals that are palomino and buckskin. Height is 13–14 hands (52–56 inches, 132–142 cm) and weight is 600–800 pounds (270–360 kg). | NV | horse | 0 | |
| Miller Flat HA | Sometimes called "Miller Wash," this HA is adjacent to Little Mountain, and the combined HAs are about 146,000 acres (59,000 ha). Horses descend from ranch stock and cavalry remounts with influences from a wide variety of breeds ranging from Quarter horses, Arabians, Thoroughbreds to draft horses. Most horses are solid dark colors, but there are also roans. Height is 13–14 hands (52–56 inches, 132–142 cm) and weight is 600–800 pounds (270–360 kg). | NV | horse | 53 | |
| Monte Cristo WHT | Area contains both BLM and USFS land, all administered by the BLM as part of the Pancake HMA. Horses are 13 to 15 hands (52 to 60 inches, 132 to 152 cm) and of a variety of colors. Most horses descend from ranch stock or miners' animal, but the area also has a Curly horse population brought to the region in 1874 by Tom Dixon. | NV | horse | AML 236 2005 (merged) | |
| Montezuma Peak | All equines were to be removed in 1996, but a few were missed or strayed in from adjacent HMAs and thus a small population remained. By 2005 there were 19 horses and 25 burros. A 2010 gather set a goal of removing animals to meet a goal of 3 horses and 10 burros. | NV | horse burro | 5 horses, 7 burros | |
| Montgomery Pass HMA | No detail given on herd characteristics. Joint BLM and USFS area managed by the USFS | NV | horse | 173/AML 64–81 | |
| Moriah HA | This HA has a small amount of private land contained within its boundaries. Horses are descended from a variety of breeds and of uncertain origin, but probably ranch stock. Solid colors, 13–15 hands (52–60 inches, 132–152 cm). | NV | horse | 174 | |
| Mormon Mountains HA | Herd area that is part of a complex that also includes Meadow Valley Mountains and Blue Nose Peak. Horses in the area descend from ranch stock and cavalry remounts. Horses have characteristics of both light saddle horse breeds and draft horses. Horses are small, 13 to 14 hands (52 to 56 inches, 132 to 142 cm), 600 to 800 pounds (270 to 360 kg). Mostly solid and cream dilution colors. | NV | horse | 0 | |
| Muddy Mountains | Desert habitat about 40 miles from Las Vegas, Nevada and boundary includes Lake Mead. Some burros migrate to adjacent National Park Service (NPS) land, and the area is jointly administered by the BLM and the NPS. | NV | burro | 50 | |
| Nevada Wild Horse Range | The HMA is contained within the Nellis Air Force Range and no visitor access or photography is allowed for National Defense security reasons. This was the first officially designated wild horse area in the United States, created in 1962 by a Cooperative Agreement between the Air Force unit and the BLM. The pressure from advocates for wild horses was instrumental in creating this range. The Nellis Range Complex is primarily used for "weapons development and flight training". Wild horses are a secondary use. | NV | horse | AML 500 | |
| New Pass-Ravenwood | Horses are mostly dark solid colors, a few are of Curly horse type. Area held 945 animals prior to fires in the late 1990s when most were removed until the vegetation could recover. | NV | horse | AML 476 | |
| Nightingale Mountains | No detail given on herd characteristics. | NV | horse | AML 63 | |
| North Monitor/Kelly Creek | Joint HMA/WHT area administered by the USFS | NV | horse | 73/AML 6–8 | |
| North Stillwater | No detail given on herd characteristics. | NV | horse | AML 138–205 | |
| Owyhee | Part of a complex that includes Little Humboldt, Little Owyhee, Owyhee, Rock Creek and Snowstorm. | NV | horse | AML 139–231 | |
| Palmetto | All horses in this area disappeared between 1990 and 1997 for unknown reasons. Theories include predation by mountain lions, or migration to another HMA due to poor habitat, but there was no evidence of a population increase in adjacent areas. | NV | horse | AML 76 | |
| Pancake HMA | A HMA complex that encompasses Sand Springs West, Pancake, Jakes Wash, and Monte Cristo Wild Horse Territory. Due to drought, a gather in 2012 removed 124 horses. | NV | horse | AML 240–493 | |
| Paymaster-Lone Mountain | Steep, rocky area with very little water, which is poor horse habitat and animals periodically migrate out of the area into other HMAs, especially Montezuma and Silver Peak. | NV | horse | AML 49 | |
| Pilot Mountain | No detail given on herd characteristics. | NV | horse | AML 415 | |
| Pinenut Mountain | Also called Nut Mountain. See California entry. HMA located entirely in Nevada but administered by California | NV | horse | AML 179 | |
| Powell Mountain HA | Herd area with no current wild equine population | NV | horse | 0 | |
| Rattlesnake HA | Merged into Silver King HMA. There is no permanent population of wild horses, but herds periodically migrate through the area from Dry Lake, especially during hard winters. Horses descend from cavalry remounts, ranch and mining stock. | NV | horse | 0 | |
| Red Rock | Formerly Red Rock-Bird Spring. Mohave Desert area surrounded by mountains. In the summer, burros stay in shaded ravines and horses remain in open areas. | NV | horse burro | AML 50 horses, 50 burros | |
| Reveille | Most of the horse herd has migrated outside of this HMA due to poor forage. The AML may be set too high for the habitat available. | NV | horse | AML 138 | |
| Roberts Mountain | Horses tend to be larger than those in other wild horse herds in the area. They have a wide range of body types and coat colors. There some Curly horses in this HMA. | NV | horse | AML 150 | |
| Rock Creek | Horses descend from workhorses and draft horses turned loose by the Ellison Ranching Company, which held a grazing permit for this area at the time of the 1971 Act. Additional ancestry of the herd came from a wide range of breeds descended from ranch stock and settlers' horses. Horses are larger than usual wild horses and have good conformation. Roan horses are particularly common and many horses in this HMA have bold white markings. | NV | horse | AML 250 | |
| Rocky Hills | Horses in this HMA can be as tall as 16 hands (64 inches, 163 cm) and some have draft traits. Gathers in the area have found Curly horses, as well as many colorfully marked horses such as Appaloosas and pintos as well as some roans, buckskins and duns. Area ranches crossed a variety of light riding horse and draft breeds on Curlies and those horses were the ancestors of this herd. | NV | horse | AML 143 | |
| Sand Springs East/West | A combined HMA and HA. Horses have a wide range of coat colors, descended from a variety of light horse and draft breeds brought in by ranchers and miners. | NV | horse | AML 29–49 | |
| Saulsbury | Horses migrate between this HMA and the Monitor wild horse territory administered by the USFS. The BLM and USFS jointly administer this area. | NV | horse | AML 40 | |
| Seaman Range HA | Area with very limited water, which has required emergency removal of the horses in times of extreme drought. Horses are descended from ranch and mining stock dating back to the 1800s. Horses have a wide range of coat colors, notably grays and roans. | NV | horse | 26 | |
| Seven Mile | Horses are thought to have descended from ranch stock and are relatively tall and with good conformation, standing between 15 and 16 hands (60 and 64 inches, 152 and 163 cm). They are reputed to have calm dispositions. This area is adjacent to Little Fish Lake and Fish Creek HMAs and the USFS Butler Basin WHT. | NV | horse | AML 100 | |
| Seven Troughs | Horses are descended from ranch stock, of mostly solid colors, but including a number of buckskins and duns. Burros descend from escaped pack animals and are mostly gray, but a few are pinto. | NV | horse burro | AML 117–156 horses AML 35–46 burros | |
| Shawave Mountains | Horses are believed to descend from ranch stock and are of most solid colors, but include some roans and duns. No AML for burros, but some live there. | NV | horse | AML 44–73 | |
| Silver King | Created from merging Dry Lake, Highland Peak and Rattlesnake. | NV | horse | 789/AML 60–128 | |
| Silver Peak | All horses were removed in 1996, but by 1997 nine new horses had migrated into the area. By 2005, estimated population was 58. A few burros were also counted, though the area is not managed for burros. | NV | horse | AML 314 | |
| Snowstorm Mountains | Horses probably descended from ranch stock, but there is no specific information known about this herd. They are small, 12 to 14 hands (48 to 56 inches, 122 to 142 cm), and of most solid colors, including palominos and buckskins, as well as some pintos, grays, roans, and whites. | NV | horse | AML 90–140 | |
| South Shoshone | Horses are thought to migrate between this HMA and the Bald Mountain and Callaghan HMAs. Horses are larger than most wild horse herds and some are pinto. | NV | horse | AML 78 | |
| South Stillwater | No detail given on herd characteristics. | NV | horse | AML 16 | |
| Spruce-Pequop | Horses are of average size, 14.2–15 hands (58–60 inches, 147–152 cm), and are of a wide variety of coat colors. | NV | horse | AML 82 | |
| Stone Cabin | This HMA was where the first congressionally approved wild horse gather was held, in 1975. It is part of a complex that includes adjacent USFS land, Nellis AFB and the Reveille HMA. The area includes a unique type of horse called the "Stone Cabin Grey" and these horses were particularly valued by "Wild Horse Annie", Velma Bronn Johnston. Some think they descended from a Steeldust-bred horse from Texas brought into the area by a gunslinger named Jack Longstreet. A number of other horses of Quarter Horse breeding contributed to the herd. | NV | horse | AML 364 | |
| Stonewall | The habitat is suitable for burros, but not horses. Even though an AML is established for the HMA, there are no horses living there and only a few burros | NV | horse burro | 0 horses, 3 burros/AML 50 horses, AML 25 burros | |
| Tobin Range | Horses are descended from ranch stock and most are dark solid colors | NV | horse | AML 12–19 | |
| Triple B HMA | No detail given on horse characteristics, but was created from a merge of Butte, Buck and Bald, and Cherry Creek | NV | horse | AML 250–518 | |
| Warm Springs Canyon | Horses descend from ranch stock and are found in a wide range of colors. Burros descend from pack animals brought in by miners and sheep herders. Most burros are gray but a few are pinto. | NV | horse burro | AML 105–175 horses AML 15–24 burros | |
| Wassuk | Horses descend from ranch stock and average 14 to 15 hands (56 to 60 inches, 142 to 152 cm) and are noted for their surefootedness in the rugged terrain of this area. | NV | horse | AML 109–165 | |
| Wheeler Pass | No detail given on herd characteristics. | NV | horse burro | AML 47–66 horses AML 20–35 burros | |
| Whistler Mountain | Adjacent to Roberts Mountain HMA and the herd migrates between the two areas. Horses tend to be larger than those in other wild horse herds in the area. They have a wide range of body types and coat colors. There some Curly horses in this HMA. | NV | horse | AML 24 | |
| White River HA | No detail given on herd characteristics. Downgraded from a HMA to a HA | NV | horse | 180 | |
| Wilson Creek HA | Merged into Eagle HMA. 2005 census showed a population of 521 horses though the area had an AML of 160 at the time. 2015 census is technically zero due to merger. | NV | horse | 0 (merged) | |

=== New Mexico ===
List of HMAs in New Mexico
| Name | Herd description | State | Type(s) | Pop./AML | Ref. |
|---|---|---|---|---|---|
| Bordo Atravesado HMA | Origins not defined. To increase the genetic diversity of the original herd, horses from unrelated herds were brought into the area, 13 in 1992 and two stallions in 1997 and 1998. | NM | horse | AML 40–60 | |
| Carracas Mesa HMA/Jicarila WHT | BLM/USFS jointly administered area because the herd crosses jurisdictional boundaries. Herd has been genetically tested and has a mixed background of cavalry stock, ranch horses and horses originating from the Jicarilla Apache Reservation. | NM | horse | AML 18–23 | |

=== Oregon ===
List of HMAs in Oregon
| Name | Herd description | State | Type(s) | Pop./AML | Ref. |
|---|---|---|---|---|---|
| Beatys Butte | Some horses show Spanish characteristics, the remainder are assorted draft type or saddle type. Some show Thoroughbred characteristics. Size ranges from 14 to 16 hands (56 to 64 inches, 142 to 163 cm) and 950–1,300 pounds (430–590 kg). | OR | horse | 1,255/AML 150–250 (Note: In November 2015, 1070 of the estimated 1255 horses were gathered and removed from the Beatys Butte HMA.) | |
| Cold Springs | Originally of draft horse type, nearly all of the original herd died off in an extremely hard winter in the early 1990s. Horses from other HMAs were brought in to restock, but there were no horses of the same physical type, so the current herd is now of saddle horse type. | OR | horse | AML 75–150 | |
| Coyote Lake/Alvord-Tule Springs HA | Coyote Lake HMA and Alvord-Tule Springs HA managed as one unit because horse herds have a corridor to migrate between them. Many horses are descended from remount stallions of Thoroughbred ancestry, others are of ranch horse type. Herd has had stable characteristics since at least 1975. | OR | horse | AML 198–390 | |
| Hog Creek | Taller horses, 15 ‐ 16 hands (60 ‐ 64 inches, 152 ‐ 163 cm), 950 to 1,300 pounds (430 to 590 kg). Genetic analysis found some Spanish ancestry, gaited horse ancestry and a bit of draft horse or possibly pony blood. After a 1997 gather, three stallions from other HMAs were added to the herd to increase genetic diversity. | OR | horse | 62/AML 30–50 | |
| Jackies Butte | Military remount type, genetically similar to light racing and riding horses. Selective management to preserve the body type including introduction of horses from other HMAs and removal of undesired animals. Traits include hot‐blooded temperament, small head, good withers, and relatively small feet. | OR | horse | AML 75–150 | |
| Kiger | Spanish mustang type known as the Kiger Mustang. Most horses are dun with primitive markings, some buckskins. Generally 13 to 15 hands (52 to 60 inches, 132 to 152 cm), 750 to 1,000 pounds (340 to 450 kg). Small hooves, Light to medium bone and small feet. Ear tips are often hooked and mares tend to have very fine muzzles. | OR | horse | 130/AML 51–82 | |
| Ligget Table | Herd is very uniform in look, taller, 15–15.2 hands (60–62 inches, 152–157 cm), 900 to 1,150 pounds (410 to 520 kg), mostly chestnut and considered of above average conformation. Isolated population descended from rodeo stock. | OR | horse | 35/AML 10–25 | |
| Murderer's Creek WHT | USFS-managed area, of which about 33,944 acres (13,737 ha) is BLM land and 31,865 acres (12,895 ha) is USFS land. | OR | horse | AML 35 (BLM only) | |
| Paisley Desert | Genetic analysis of herd shows similarity with Spanish horses and Gaited North American breeds, including the Morgan, American Saddlebred, and Kentucky Mountain Saddle Horse. | OR | horse | 154/AML 60–150 | |
| Palomino Buttes | Local ranch stock of saddle horse type, 15 to 16 hands (60 to 64 inches, 152 to 163 cm) 1,000–1,300 pounds (450–590 kg). All horses were removed in 1977 due to drought, and those returned are now managed for palomino and red dun color. | OR | horse | 78/AML 32–64 | |
| Pokegama | The only HMA in the Cascade Range. Smaller horses, 14 to 15 hands (56 to 60 inches, 142 to 152 cm), 900 to 1,000 pounds (410 to 450 kg). Herd thought to date to the early 1900s. | OR/ CA | horse | AML 30–50 | |
| Riddle Mountain | Spanish mustang type known as the Kiger Mustang. Most horses are dun with primitive markings, some buckskins. Generally 13 to 15 hands (52 to 60 inches, 132 to 152 cm), 750 to 100 pounds (340 to 45 kg). Small hooves, Light to medium bone and small feet. Ear tips are often hooked and mares tend to have very fine muzzles. | OR | horse | AML 33–66 | |
| Sand Springs | Predominantly pinto and buckskin, saddle horse type, 14.2 ‐ 15.2 hands (58 ‐ 62 inches, 147 ‐ 157 cm), 1,050–1,250 pounds (480–570 kg). Herd is managed for preservation of color and conformation. | OR | horse | 128/AML 100–200 | |
| Sheepshead/Heath Creek | Saddle-type horses 14–15.2 hands (56–62 inches, 142–157 cm) with evidence of Thoroughbred ancestry. Formerly named Heath Creek /Sheepshead, after a 2008 gather, the HMA was renamed | OR | horse | 161–302 | |
| South Steens | Horses are 14–16 hands (56–64 inches, 142–163 cm), 900–1,200 pounds (410–540 kg) managed for pinto color and good conformation. Colors include pinto, buckskin, sorrel, bay, palomino, gray, brown, and black | OR | horse | 662/AML 159–304 | |
| Stinkingwater | Horses descended from ranch stock and animals abandoned by homesteaders. Horses now managed for light draft horse type. 14.2 to 16 hands (58 to 64 inches, 147 to 163 cm), 950 to 1,350 pounds (430 to 610 kg) | OR | horse | 144/AML 40–80 | |
| Three Fingers | Horses mostly descended from homesteaders and ranch stock, with possibly some Army remount horse ancestry as well. | OR | horse | AML 75–150 | |
| Warm Springs | Heavy-muscled saddle-type horses, noted for good disposition. "Genetic analysis determined similarity with Old World Iberian breeds followed by North American Gaited Breeds." Ranchers bred horses in the area dating back to about 1900. | OR | horse burro | 368 horses/AML 111–202 horses 49 burros/AML 20–25 burros | |

=== Utah ===
List of HMAs in Utah
| Name | Herd description | State | Type(s) | Pop./AML | Ref. |
|---|---|---|---|---|---|
| Bible Springs Complex | Consists of four areas, Bible Spring HMA, Blawn Wash, Four Mile, and Tilly Creek. Management to keep horses with historic Spanish Barb characteristics | UT | horse | AML 30–60 | |
| Blawn Wash HA | Part of the Bible Springs complex that also includes Four Mile and Tilly Creek. Management to keep horses with historic Spanish Barb characteristics. | UT | horse | 85 | |
| Bonanza HA | Horses in this herd area were descended from ranch stock and/or horses from the Uintah and Ouray Indian Reservation. There are also free-roaming horses on adjacent tribally owned lands | UT | horse | 0 | |
| Canyonlands | No detail given on herd characteristics. | UT | burro | 100 | |
| Cedar Mountain | Horse herds in the area date to the late 1800s. Horses weigh between 700 and 1,000 pounds (320 and 450 kg). Wide range of colors with black and bay the most common. | UT | horse | 290–434/AML 190–390 | |
| Chloride Canyon | Not currently managed for wild horses or burros | UT | horse | 0 | |
| Choke Cherry | Horses in this area migrate across state lines into Wilson Creek HMA in Nevada. Ranch stock origins, range from 14.1 to 15 hands (57 to 60 inches, 145 to 152 cm) in height | UT | horse | 20–30 | |
| Confusion Mountain | Large number of grays and other "light colors"; herd is managed to maintain these colors. Origin unknown but ranch stock added over the years, resulting in horses that are a bit taller than other horses in area HMAs. | UT | horse | 368/AML 70–100 | |
| Conger | Genetic study in 2009 showed high genetic diversity and mixed ancestry from North American breeds. | UT | horse | 285 AML est. 40–80 | |
| Frisco | Genetic testing in 2006 and 2012 showed herd was in genetic equilibrium and is of mixed ancestry, probably from local ranch stock or possibly animals strayed from mining areas nearby. Mostly bays and roans. Adult animals average in size from 14 to 14–2 hands tall. | UT | horse | AML 30–60 | |
| Harvey's Fear HA | Herd area, not managed for a wild horse population | UT | horse | 25 | |
| Hill Creek | No detail given on herd characteristics. | UT | horse | AML 195 | |
| Kingtop | No detail given on herd characteristics. | UT | horse | 40 | |
| Mount Elinor | Not currently managed for a wild horse or burro population | UT | horse | 25 | |
| Muddy Creek | Weight averages 700 to 1,000 pounds (320 to 450 kg) Origins of horses and burros in the area date to the Old Spanish Trail in the early 1800s with ranch stock added later. | UT | horse | AML 50 | |
| North Hills | Jointly managed as the North Hills Wild Horse Management Plan Area with the USFS North Hills Wild Horse Territory | UT | horse | 250/AML 40–60 | |
| Onaqui Mountains | Concern that genetic variability of the herd was critically low, so horses from other HMAs were added to the herd. Goal to improve adoptability by selecting for size, color and improved conformation. Horses have been in the area since the late 1800s, mostly from local ranch stock. | UT | horse | AML 121–210 | |
| Oquirrh Mountain HA | Herd area not managed for a wild horse population | UT | horse | 15 | |
| Range Creek | Original stock may have escaped from the Preston Nutter ranch. Stout with compact conformation 800 to 1,100 pounds (360 to 500 kg), mostly bay and black, a few chestnuts and pintoa. | UT | horse | 125 | |
| Robbers Roost HA | Horses have been in this area since at least 1800, originating from settlers' horses that strayed, followed by horses from local ranch stock. Most horses now are gray, black and roan and weigh between 700 and 1,000 pounds (320 and 450 kg). | UT | horse | 33 | |
| Sinbad | Original horses and burros in the area date to the early 1800s. The owner of a uranium mine, Joe Swasey, also bred horses and brought Thoroughbreds to the area in the late 1800s where they ran on the open range, and also bred Welsh ponies, used in the mining operations. Horses now are black, buckskin, grulla, and bay, 13 to 14 hands (52 to 56 inches, 132 to 142 cm). | UT | horse burro | AML 50 horses AML 70 burros | |
| Sulphur | Horses are nationally recognized for their Colonial Spanish characteristics. Dun coloring with primitive markings is common. Genetic marker data from 1995 and 2006 showed a "clear Spanish component" in the ancestry of the herd, but some mixed blood as well. Horses often are near a highway and car-animal collisions have occurred. Utah heritage older than horses in other HMAs. | UT | horse | 95 (2016)/AML 165–250 | |
| Swasey | No detail given on herd characteristics. | UT | horse | AML 60–100 | |
| Tilly Creek | Part of the Bible Spring complex that also includes Bible Spring, Blawn Wash, and Four Mile. Management to keep horses with historic Spanish Barb characteristics | UT | horse | AML 20–50 | |
| Winter Ridge HA | Herd area not managed for a wild horse population | UT | horse | 98 | |

=== Wyoming ===
List of HMAs in Wyoming
| Name | Herd description | State | Type(s) | Pop./AML | Ref. |
|---|---|---|---|---|---|
| Adobe Town | Descended from estray ranch horses, many grays and roans. | WY | horse | AML 610–800 | |
| Antelope Hills | Spanish type. Predominantly bay or brown, genetic markers consistent with Spanish Colonial horse breeds. | WY | horse | AML 60–82 | |
| Conant Creek | Mixed light saddle type. Geographically contiguous Conant Creek, Dishpan Butte, Muskrat Basin and Rock Creek HMAs are managed individually but with gates left open so horses may migrate freely between them to enhance genetic diversity. AML 320–536 in four combined HMAs | WY | horse | AML 60–100 | |
| Crooks Mountain | No detail given on herd characteristics. | WY | horse | AML 65–85 | |
| Dishpan Butte | Mixed light saddle type. Geographically contiguous Conant Creek, Dishpan Butte, Muskrat Basin and Rock Creek HMAs are managed individually but with gates left open so horses may migrate freely between them to enhance genetic diversity. AML 320–536 in four combined HMAs | WY | horse | AML 100 | |
| Divide Basin | Mixed light horse type, some gaited. Wide variety of coat colors, origins from multiple domestic horse breeds, many closely related to American gaited horse breeds. Size is 14.2–15.2 hands (58–62 inches, 147–157 cm) weight 750–1,100 pounds (340–500 kg). | WY | horse | AML 415–600 | |
| Fifteenmile | Location of the first recorded wild horse gather on federal rangeland October, 1938 | WY | horse | AML 70–160 | |
| Green Mountain | Light saddle type. Mostly solid-colored horses, some tobiano pintos. Size 11 to 15 hands (44 to 60 inches, 112 to 152 cm), 750–1,000 pounds (340–450 kg) | WY | horse | AML 170–300 | |
| Little Colorado | Mixed light horse type, some gaited. Solid, mostly dark colors and some grays, origins from multiple domestic horse breeds, many closely related to American gaited horse breeds. Size is 14.2–15.2 hands (58–62 inches, 147–157 cm) weight 750–1,100 pounds (340–500 kg). | WY | horse | AML 69–100 | |
| Lost Creek | Mixed light horse type, Spanish horse ancestry possible. A genetic study in 2010 by Gus Cothran of Texas A&M indicated mixed North American ancestry with high genetic diversity and possibly some, limited Iberian ancestry. Most animals influenced by estray domestic saddle stock. Size 14 to 15 hands (56 to 60 inches, 142 to 152 cm), 800–1,000 pounds (360–450 kg) pounds mature weight. | WY | horse | AML 60–82 | |
| McCullough Peaks | Moderate to large size, wide variety of coat colors, good conformation, quality horse habitat allows horses to stay in good physical condition. Popular HMA for horse adoptions and tourists. | WY | horse | AML 100–140 | |
| Muskrat Basin | Mixed light saddle type. Geographically contiguous Conant Creek, Dishpan Butte, Muskrat Basin and Rock Creek HMAs are managed individually but with gates left open so horses may migrate freely between them to enhance genetic diversity. AML 320–536 in four combined HMAs | WY | horse | AML 160–250 | |
| Rock Creek Mountain | Mixed light saddle type. Geographically contiguous Conant Creek, Dishpan Butte, Muskrat Basin and Rock Creek HMAs are managed individually but with gates left open so horses may migrate freely between them to enhance genetic diversity. AML 320–536 in four combined HMAs | WY | horse | AML 50–86 | |
| Salt Wells Creek | Mixed light horse type, some gaited. Wide variety of coat colors, high percentage palomino and sorrel with flaxen. Origins from multiple domestic horse breeds, many closely related to American gaited horse breeds. Size is 14.2–15.2 hands (58–62 inches, 147–157 cm) weight 750–1,100 pounds (340–500 kg). | WY | horse | AML 251–365 | |
| Stewart Creek | Light saddle type. Wide variety of coat colors, a noticeable number of Appaloosas. Herd has been influenced by routine additions of estray domesticated stock. Size 14 to 15 hands (56 to 60 inches, 142 to 152 cm), 800–1,000 pounds (360–450 kg). Natural gas and uranium produced in the area. | WY | horse | AML 125–175 | |
| White Mountain | Mixed light horse type, some gaitedWide variety of coat colors including roan and pinto, origins from multiple domestic horse breeds, many closely related to American gaited horse breeds. Size is 14.2–15.2 hands (58–62 inches, 147–157 cm) weight 750–1,100 pounds (340–500 kg). | WY | horse | AML 205–300 | |

== Forest Service wild horse territories ==
In addition to the Bureau of Land Management Herd Management Areas, the United States Forest Service also has wild horse territories that fall under the Wild and Free-Roaming Horses and Burros Act of 1971. Some are managed in conjunction with the BLM and about 37 are managed by the USFS. Though called "wild horse territories", a few contain burros. Current territories identified as such by the USFS, listed by the state office that manages each, include the following:

Key
USFS Territories are sourced to footnote unless otherwise noted
† Double-listed as a BLM HMA or cooperatively managed with the BLM
†† Current AML is zero, federal land habitat insufficient to support a viable horse population

Arizona

- Deep Creek, Arizona/New Mexico
- Double A, Arizona†

California

- Big Bear Wild Burro Territory, California†
- Black Mountain Wild Horse Territory, California
- Brushy Mountain Wild Horse Territory, California
- Devil's Garden Plateau Wild Horse Territory, California†
- McGavin Peak Wild Horse Territory, California† ††
- Saline Valley, California
- Three Sisters Wild Horse Territory, California
- White Mountain Wild Horse Territory, California/Nevada

Nevada

- Burro Wild Burro Territory, Nevada
- Butler Basin Wild Horse Territory, Nevada
- Cherry Spring Wild Horse Territory, Nevada
- Dobbin Summit Wild Horse Territory, Nevada
- Ellsworth Wild Horse Territory, Nevada
- Johnny, Nevada†
- Kelly Creek Wild Horse Territory, Nevada
- Little Fishlake Wild Horse Territory, Nevada†
- Monitor Wild Horse Territory, Nevada† (USFS manages BLM North Monitor HMA)
- Monte Cristo Wild Horse Territory, Nevada†
- Mount Moriah, Nevada
- Murphy Wash, Nevada
- Northumberland Wild Horse Territory, Nevada
- Paradise Peak Wild Horse Territory, Nevada
- Powell Mountain, Nevada
- Quinn, Nevada
- Red Rock, Nevada†
- Seven Mile, Nevada
- Shoshone Wild Horse Territory, Nevada
- Spring Mountains, Nevada
- Stone Cabin, Nevada†
- Tierney Wild Horse Territory, Nevada
- Toiyabe Wild Horse Territory, Nevada
- Toquima Wild Horse Territory, Nevada

New Mexico

- Caja del Rio Wild Horse Territory, New Mexico
- Chicoma, New Mexico
- Deep Creek, Arizona/New Mexico
- Dome, New Mexico
- Heber, New Mexico
- Jarita Wild Horse Territory, New Mexico (aka Jarita Mesa)
- Jicarilla Wild Horse Territory, New Mexico†
- Mesa de Las Viegas, New Mexico
- Mesa Montosa, New Mexico
- Saguaro, New Mexico
- San Diego, New Mexico

Oregon

- Big Summit, Oregon 114 horses (AML 50–60)
- Murderer's Creek, Oregon† 254 horses (AML 50–140)

Utah

- Big Creek Wild Horse Territory, Utah
- North Hills, Utah†

== See also ==
- Mustang Heritage Foundation
- Mustang Champions
