= American Indian Horse =

American breed of horse

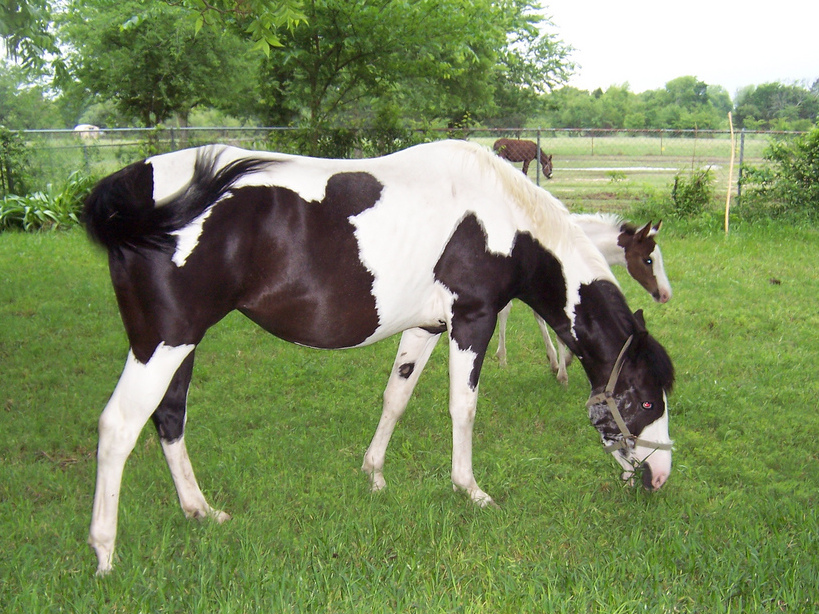
- Other names: cow pony, buffalo horse, Indian pony, "Mustang", cayuse, Spanish pony
- Country of origin: United States

Traits
- Distinguishing features: hardy horse of Spanish Colonial Horse type, found in many colors

Breed standards
- American Indian Horse Registry

The American Indian Horse is defined by its breed registry as a horse that may carry the ancestry of the Spanish Barb, Arabian, Mustang, or "Foundation" Appaloosa. It is the descendant of horses originally brought to the Americas by the Spanish and obtained by Native American people.

== Characteristics ==
American Indian Horses generally range in height from 13 to 16 hands (52 to 64 inches, 132 to 163 cm) and weigh between 700 and 1,000 pounds (320 and 450 kg). They may be any coat color and both pinto and leopard spotting patterns are common. They are hardy, surefooted, and no draft horse breeding is allowed. Some may be gaited.

== Breed history ==
The registry was created in 1961 when some breeders of Colonial Spanish Horse bloodlines considered the Spanish Mustang breeders to be departing from the original "Indian horse" phenotype. The organization was started "for the purpose of collecting, recording and preserving the pedigrees of American Indian Horses." The registry also allows the "hybrids [sic] and descendants" of the original Spanish Colonial Horse to be registered. Horses registered with other breed registries to be double-registered with this organization if the horses meet the conformation requirements.

There are five registration categories:

- Class O ("Original") horses have a recorded pedigree chart that can be traced to either one of the Mustang registries or "various American Indian tribes and families."
- Class A horses have unknown bloodlines, but meet the breed standard. This category can include grade horses or horses of unknown bloodlines. Horses adopted from the Bureau of Land Management (BLM) are Class A horses.
- Class AA horses are over four years old, have been inspected for their conformation and "are at least half-O in breeding or are of exceptional O type." Some horses adopted from the Bureau of Land Management (BLM) can qualify for this status.
- Class M ("Modern") horses are of "modern" type. They may have registered parents from breeds that the American Indian Horse Registry considers to be descended from the original type, including American Quarter Horses, Appaloosas, American Paint Horses, and horses registered with various color breed registries such as those for pinto or palomino horses.
- Class P ("Pony") registration is for ponies that have the proper type characteristics. They might have pedigreed breeding such as the Galiceno or Pony of the Americas, or could be of unknown ancestry.

== Uses ==
American Indian Horses are ridden in western-style classes in horse show and Gymkhana speed events. They are also used for pleasure riding and trail riding.

== See also ==
- List of North American horse breeds
