= Cerbat mustang =

American horse breed

Cerbat Mustang
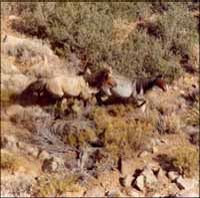
- Cerbat mustangs on the Cerbat HMA, Arizona
- Country of origin: United States

Traits
- Distinguishing features: Build is similar to the classic Andalusian horse.

The Cerbat mustang is a feral horse population of Arizona, found in the Cerbat Herd Management Area in that state. Their main coat colors are chestnut, bay, and roan. While their phenotype is similar to the classic Colonial Spanish horse, the actual origin of Cerbat mustangs is unclear, but they have been identified by DNA testing as of Colonial Spanish horse ancestry, and they are recognized by the Spanish Mustang registry as valid foundation stock for that standardized breed. Cerbats possess the ability to gait.

== Characteristics ==
The Cerbat mustang is said to be similar to the classic Andalusian horse in conformation, and has characteristics consistent with Spanish horse type. They are 14 to 15 hands (56 to 60 inches, 142 to 152 cm) tall, and average 750 to 800 pounds in weight. The first generation in captivity, however, was said to stand only 13.2 hands (54 inches, 137 cm). Cerbats are most commonly bay and roan, but there are some grays, blacks, sorrels, and duns found on the Cerbat Herd Management Area (HMA) in Arizona. Those in private hands are said to only be bay, roan, or chestnut. White markings on legs and heads are common. Roan Cerbat foals are born roan, unlike some roan foals of other stock that are born a dark color and "roan out" as they get older, fading in color. They are considered calm, quiet, and intelligent. Some Cerbats can perform intermediate ambling gaits.

The feral horse bands today are found in Arizona. For this reason, they are accepted by the Spanish Mustang registry. There is no formal Cerbat horse registry at present and the variety is very rare in captivity, with a high number of 45 horses registered, and a stable number of about 70 feral individual still found in the Cerbat HMA.

== History ==
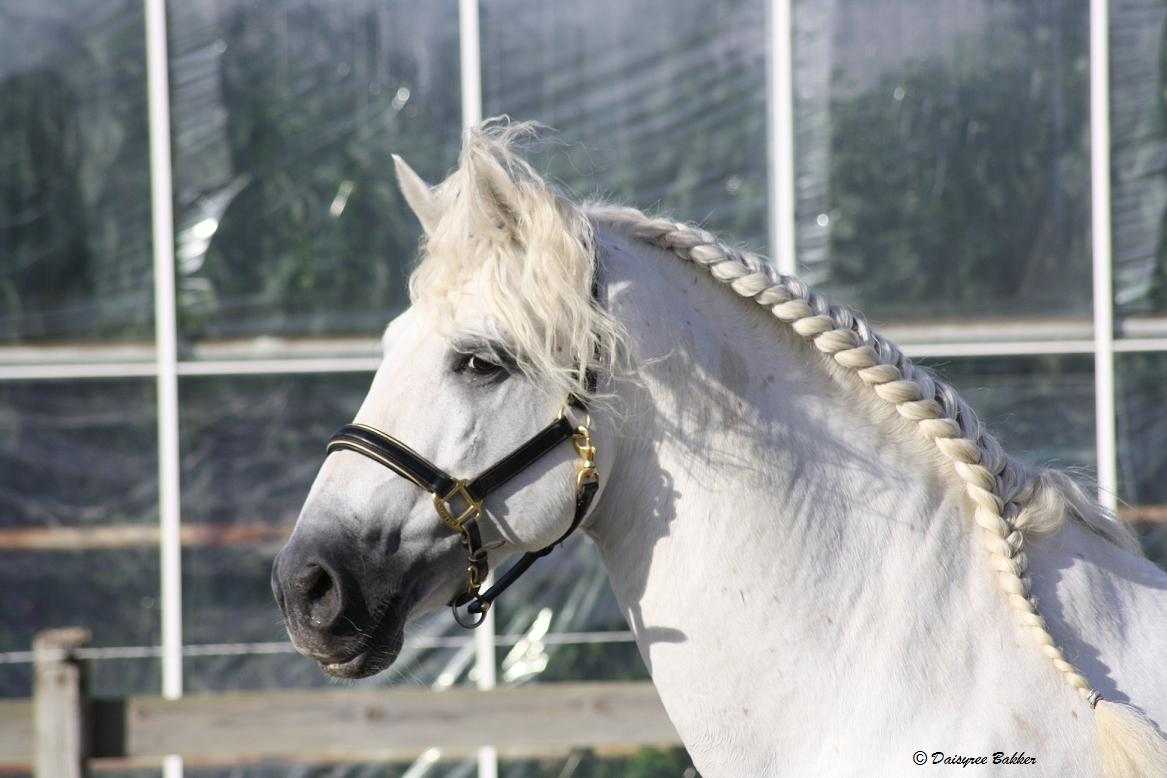
The Colonial Spanish horse is believed to be an ancestor of the Cerbat mustang and the Andalusian horse, shown here

The Cerbat mustang is named for the Cerbat Mountains, where its herd is located. It is hypothesized that the animal is descended from Colonial Spanish horses brought to New Spain – today's Southwestern United States – in the 16th century. Other hypotheses are that they arrived in the area in the 18th century or were abandoned by ranchers in the early 19th. They have been blood-tested and determined to be of Colonial Spanish horse ancestry. The Cerbats are described as of "classic Andalusian" type. The Cerbat herds were documented as well-established by 1860. In 1971, numbers dropped dramatically during a drought when livestock ranchers shot many free-roaming horses, believing that they were competing with cattle for scarce water resources. At that time, about 18 Cerbats were captured and preserved in private herds. After the passage of time, about 20 horses were found to remain in the area. In 1990, another remnant feral population was discovered by the Bureau of Land Management and blood testing determined that they were related to the animals that had been preserved in private herds. Cerbat stallions in captivity have been bred to mares of other Spanish-ancestry mustangs to keep the bloodline alive without inbreeding.

== Uses ==
Cerbat Mustangs are used in many ways, including endurance riding, eventing, trail classes, ranch and cattle work, team penning, roping, and other western competition.
