= James Wild Horse Trap =

- U.S. National Register of Historic Places
- Location within Nevada Location within the United States
- Location: About 5 miles east of Fish Springs
- Nearest city: Fish Springs, Nevada
- Coordinates: 38°46′21″N 116°21′28″W
- Area: 40 acres (16 ha)
- NRHP reference No.: 74001148
- Added to NRHP: November 19, 1974

The James Wild Horse Trap in Nye County, Nevada, near Fish Springs, is a historic site that is listed on the U.S. National Register of Historic Places. It was the location of a corral and fences used to capture wild horses, built out of dead Juniper trees. It is as described in a book by Will James, Sand, or Lone Cowboy, published by Charles Scribner's Sons in 1930.

It is significant, according to its 1973 NRHP nomination, "because of its obvious visual education ability. The current interest in wild horse protection and management increases the interest to the public to see what was used when running, killing and harassing wild horses was a common accepted practice. This is a visual evidence of a change in human/social values."

A 40-acre (16 ha) area including the wing fences and corral was listed on the National Register of Historic Places in 1974.

== See also ==
- List of BLM Herd Management Areas § Nevada
