= Galiceno =

Breed of horse

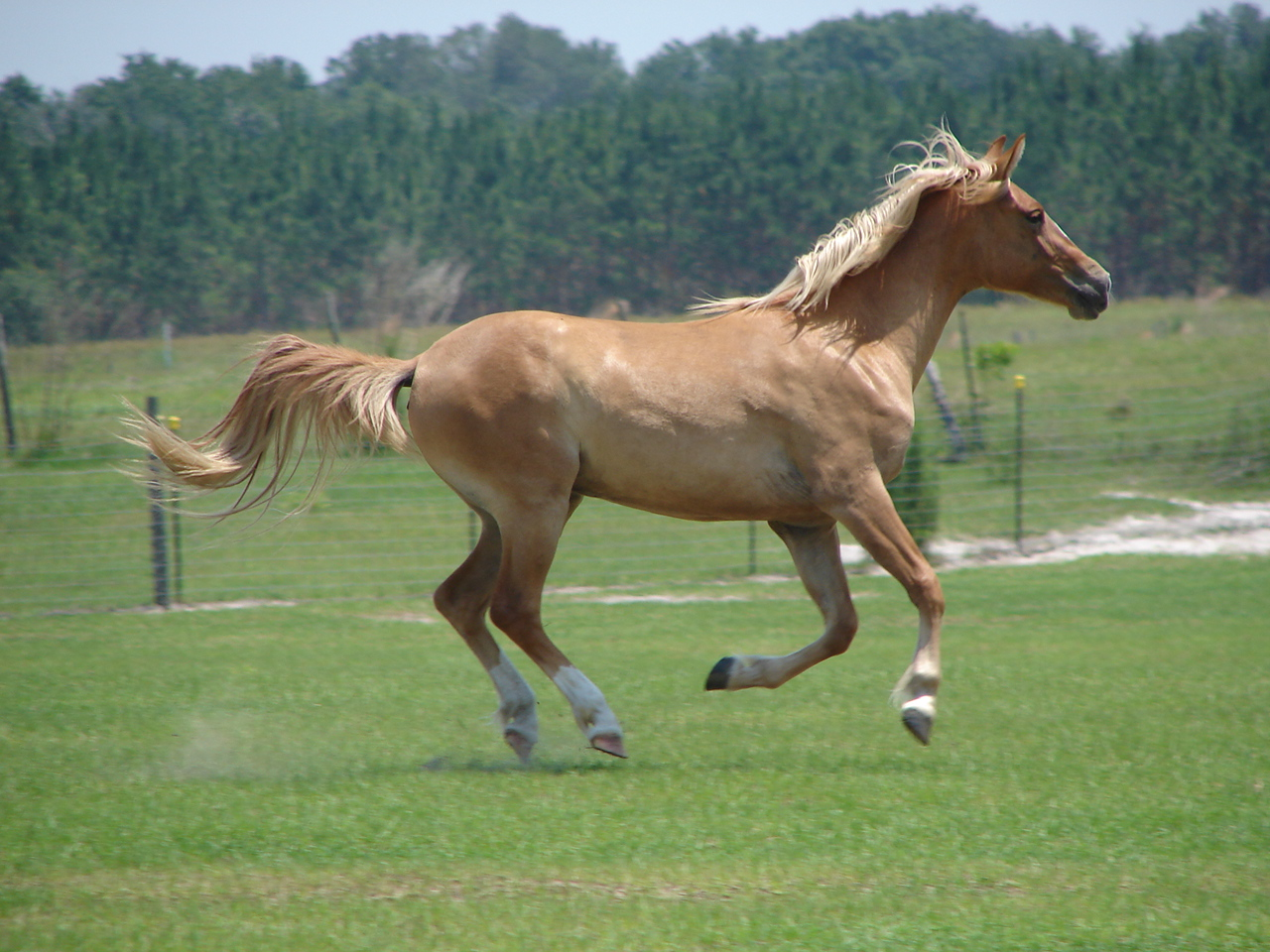
- Other names: Galiceño
- Country of origin: Mexico

The Galiceno or Galiceño is a horse breed developed in Mexico, bred from horses brought from Spain by Hernán Cortés and other conquistadors. Although small in stature, they are generally considered a horse, rather than a pony, and are always solid-colored. In Mexico, they are an all-around horse, used for riding, packing and light draft. In the United States they are often used as mounts for younger competitors, although they are also found competing in Western events. The breed descends from horses brought from Spain to Mexico during the 16th century. Many of these horses escaped or were released and formed feral bands in the interior of Mexico, which were then captured by local inhabitants. They were also often used by Spanish missionaries to the American West, where they became some of the ancestors of the American Indian Horse. In 1958, these horses were first imported to the United States, and in 1959 a breed registry was formed. Many of the horses are also registered with the American Indian Horse Registry.

== Characteristics ==
The Galiceno stands between 12 and 13.2 hands (48 and 54 inches, 122 and 137 cm) high, and weigh between 620 and 750 pounds (280 and 340 kg). They are usually bay, black, or chestnut, while pinto colorings are not allowed by the United States registry. They have a nicely proportioned head with a straight profile. The neck is short and muscular. The breed is narrow in the chest, though deep, the shoulders are straight, and the withers pronounced. The back is short, the croup sloping, and the legs long and strong, with small hooves.

The breed has good stamina, and a fast, ground-covering, running-walk gait, which is said to be smooth and comfortable to ride. They are strong, able to carry a person all day in heat and over rough terrain, despite their small size. The Galiceno is used in Mexico as a riding and pack pony, as well as for light draft and farm work. In the United States they are used as a riding pony for children, and has proved to be a good jumper for younger competitors. Their quickness and agility make them a good cutting horse, and also good for reining classes and timed events. The breed takes its name from the province of Galicia in Spain.

== History ==
The Galiceno developed in Mexico from horses imported by Hernán Cortés, mostly thought to be Portuguese Garrano and the Galician Pony of Spain. It is thought that Sorraia blood was added at some point in the breed's history. The ancestors of the Galiceno were among sixteen horses landed by Cortes during his Mexican invasion in 1519 for use in the mines and as transport. During the rest of the 16th century, conquistadors continued to bring horses into what is now Mexico, including many small-framed, smooth-gaited horses. Many of these horses eventually escaped or were released and formed feral bands in Mexico's mountainous interior. Over the next few centuries, local inhabitants began to catch and use horses from the increasing populations; the type that eventually became the Galiceno was especially prized in coastal regions. Galicenos were used by Spaniards in silver mines and as pack horses; in the latter role they moved further northward with the Spanish missions and were sometimes lost in battle or stolen by Indians. These horses eventually became part of the Mustang herds of the American West, as well as playing a role in the ancestry of the American Indian Horse.

The first Galicenos intentionally imported to the United States came in 1958 as part of a herd of 135 horses, many or all of them previously feral Mexican horses. In 1959, the Galiceño Horse Breeders Association was formed in the United States to maintain the breed; and by 2005 had registered about 7,000 horses throughout North America, with around 20 new foals registered each year. Some Galicenos are also registered with the American Indian Horse registry, which is dedicated to preserving the lines of horses bred by the Native Americans of the United States. DNA testing carried out on Galiceno horses in the United States, including one of the original horses brought out of Mexico, has found markers similar to those in other known Spanish populations. Recent studies at Texas A&M have shown that the Galicenos are closest to the Garranos of Portugal and Spain. In 2015, the breed was added to The Livestock Conservancy's (TLC) Conservation Priority List as "Critical", TLC estimates the US population to stand at between 200 and 300 animals, with a very low population of active breeding stock.
