= Choctaw Horse =

American breed of horse

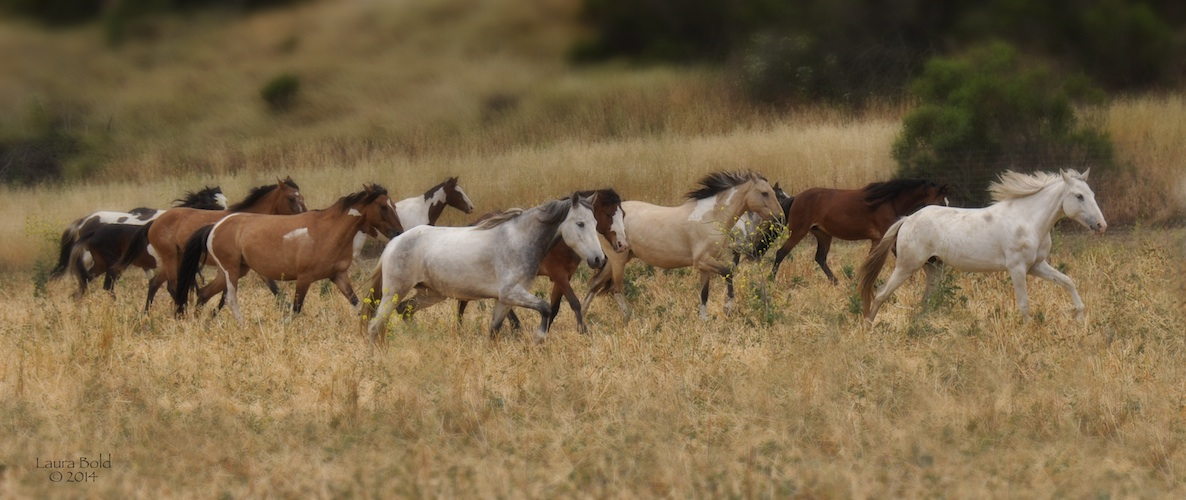
- Herd of Choctaw Horses
- Conservation status: FAO: National risk level IUCN Red List: None Livestock Conservancy: Critical
- Country of origin: United States of America
- Use: Riding

Traits
- Weight: 700 to 900 lbs
- Height: 13.2 to 14.2 hands (52 to 56 inches)
- Color: Very variable

The Choctaw Horse is an American breed or strain of small riding horse of Colonial Spanish type. Like all Colonial Spanish horses, it derives from the horses brought to the Americas by the Conquistadores in and after the late fifteenth century and introduced in the seventeenth century into what is now the United States. As is clear from the name, the Choctaw Horse is strongly associated with the indigenous Choctaw people of America, who originally bred it in their traditional homeland in the area of modern-day Alabama and Mississippi, and continued to do so after their forced removal to the Indian Territory – modern Oklahoma – in the 1830s.

It is an endangered breed and is listed – with all other Colonial Spanish breeds – by the Livestock Conservancy as 'critical'. In 2009 no more than 200 horses of the Choctaw and Cherokee strains were thought to remain.

== History ==
The Choctaw Horse derives from the horses brought to the Americas by the Conquistadores in and after the late fifteenth century and introduced in the seventeenth century into what is now the United States. It was originally bred by the indigenous Choctaw people of America in their traditional homeland in the area of modern-day Alabama and Mississippi. They were originally acquired as trade goods in the late 17th century, allowing the Choctaw to advance in the deerskin trade by increasing the efficiency of their hunting. Choctaw Horses that had died were also used during rituals, in which they were eaten. By the early 1800s, the Choctaw owned tens of thousands of horses. The Choctaw called the horse the “isuba” for spiritual reasons, which means “deer-resembler.” In the early 1800s, many Choctaw Horses accompanied Choctaw members who moved early to what would become modern-day Oklahoma. During the 1830s, the remaining Choctaw members moved to Indian Territory in Oklahoma and took their horses with them.

Until about 1970 there may have been some 1500 of the horses in Oklahoma, but in the next twenty years their numbers fell to little more than 50 head. Since the relocation of the Choctaw Nation, there has been a decreasing number of indigenous breeders for the horse. In the twenty-first century it is an endangered breed and its conservation status is listed, together with all other Colonial Spanish breeds, as 'critical' by the Livestock Conservancy.

Some bloodlines of the extinct Chickasaw Horse are preserved in the Choctaw breed.

== Characteristics ==
Height at the withers is usually in the range 137–147 cm (13.2–14.2 h). Coat color is highly variable; colors include the usual bay, black, brown, chestnut and sorrel, and also buckskin, dun, and palomino as well as leopard blanket, spotted and varnish roan patterns, pinto patterns, and sabino. The horses often have additional gaits such as a fast running walk. They have particularly strong hooves. They are known to be tough, durable, and to have great endurance. They have broad foreheads and narrow chests allowing for greater lung capacity.

== Use ==
It is a riding and working horse, with notable endurance. They were used for farming and trading in the 17th to 19th century.

== Conservation ==
During the middle of the 19th century most colonial horses, such as the Choctaw Horse, were being replaced by larger counterparts like the Thoroughbred Horse due to their usefulness in agriculture and the military. The breed went nearly extinct in 1950, and they are now critically endangered. In 2009, Monique Sheaffer, a Choctaw, began an effort with her family to breed the horses with the goal to preserve their genes and to educate the public. As of 2018, a farm in Poplarville, Mississippi, has been selectively breeding the Choctaw Horses for thirteen years. For breeders, Choctaw Horses with little genetic influence from other North American breeds can be correctly differentiated, translating to effective conservation efforts for the strain.
