= American Walking Pony =

American gaited horse breed

- Country of origin: United States

Traits
- Height: Up to 14 hands (56 inches, 142 cm)

The American Walking Pony is a modern American breed of gaited riding pony. It was created by crossbreeding of the Tennessee Walking Horse and the Welsh Pony. Originally developed in Georgia, the breed was established in 1968 after several years of selective breeding. Joan Hudson Brown is credited as the founder of the breed and was the first executive secretary of the breed registry. The original breeding goal was to combine the smooth gait of the Tennessee Walker with the small size and refinement of the Welsh pony. Any combination of the two breeds is acceptable for the registry.

Foundation stock for the breed included BT Golden Splendor, the first stallion recorded with the registry, and the mare Browntree's Flicka, who was given registration number 1. The desired ambling gaits of the breed are smooth, called the Pleasure Walk and the Merry Walk. Ponies are also able to trot and canter, and have been exhibited in five-gaited competition. The gaitedness ability is hereditary, and promoters of the breed claim that it actually can execute seven gaits, stating that this ability is comparable to the famous Tennessee Walking Horse stallion Roan Allen, though the two additional gaits are not specified. In addition to riding, the breed is also shown in formal driving, pleasure driving, and pony show jumping.
