= North American Sportpony =

Breed of horse

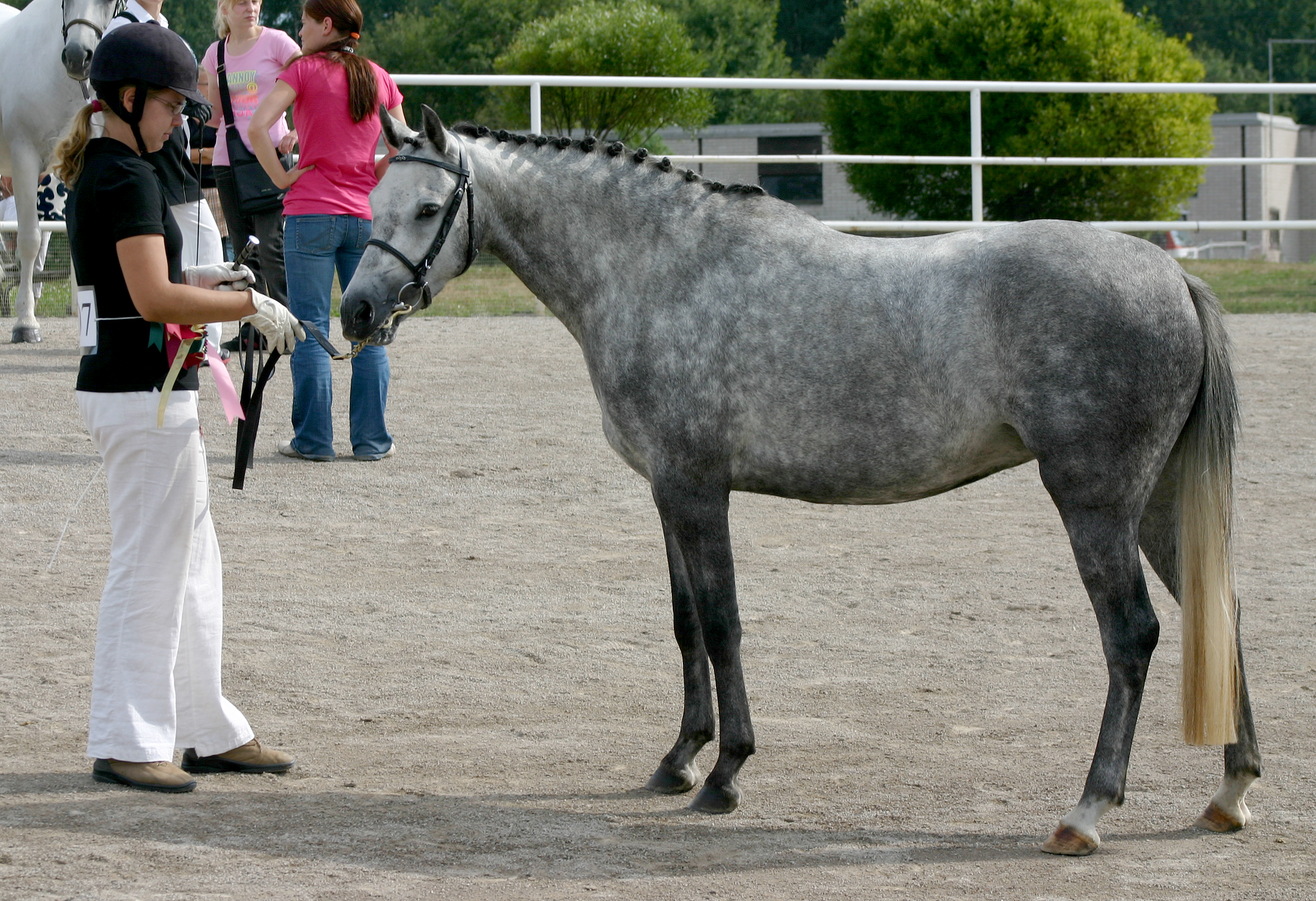
- Country of origin: Bred in the USA from a variety of foundation horse and pony breeds

Traits
- Distinguishing features: Muscular, proportioned, dry head, flat knees.

Breed standards
- North American Sportpony Registry

The North American Sportpony is a relatively new pony breed in the United States. Its origins are from a diverse group of breeds, because the "Sportpony" is not derived from specific bloodlines, but rather is a conformation type, akin to the American Warmblood.

As their name suggests, they are commonly used as smaller mounts for both adult and youth competitors in sporting competitions that range from dressage to jumping with competitiveness that ranges from local shows, to the international level. The Sportpony registry was a spinoff from the American Warmblood registry, and originated to fill the need for an equine mount that could be as athletic and competitive as its Warmblood cousins, but in a size more practical and manageable for smaller riders.

The Sportpony is first and foremost a pony with a height range of 13.2–14.2 hands (54–58 inches, 137–147 cm). It must look and move like a small horse ideally, and must be physically capable of competing in a wide variety of disciplines. Bloodlines of both horses and ponies, including the Quarter Horse, the Thoroughbred, the Arabian, the Morgan, the Connemara pony, and the Welsh Pony, can be found in the Sportpony. The ideal Sportpony is capable of being family-friendly as well as a successful animal in the show ring.

== Breed characteristics ==
The North American Sportpony Registry has one official breed standard even though they participate in a variety of different disciplines. They must look and move like a small horse, with the ability to compete in the internationally recognized disciplines of jumping, dressage, eventing, and combined driving. It should not look like the stereotypical pony, which is stout, and stout, but rather be an athletic, willing, mount.

Movement is a key characteristic of a Sportpony. The animal should have excellent elasticity, impulsion, articulation, and suspension. The traditional ‘flat-kneed’ movement that is popular in the hunter ring now is not a goal striven for by the Sportpony breed, but it is accepted. Ideally a Sportpony would move like a Warmblood, and be very smooth, agile, and elastic but on a smaller scale.

To be accepted into the Sportpony Registry, ponies must undergo an inspection as well as be DNA-typed. The reason for this is that the Sportpony is not a breed that originated in bloodlines. With a DNA base that can be referenced, it will create a bloodline that follows the physical type and can be referenced. The inspection includes not only looking at the pony's conformation, but its way of going and temperament as well. Stallions looking to be accepted into the Registry must pass additional performance and strict progeny requirements.

As far as physical requirements, the pony must be between 13.2 and 14.2 hands (54 and 58 inches, 137 and 147 cm). All colors are accepted. The head must be small and regal, and be cleanly attached to a long, wide neck. Limbs should be dry and have flat knees. Their movement should be rhythmic and correct, with significant impulsion from the hindquarters.

== Breed development ==
The North American Sportpony Registry began in 1997 as a division of the American Warmblood Registry. There was a major need for a North American counterpart for the Warmblood movement taking part in Europe. The sudden demand for horses that were strong and physically inclined to excel in sporting events was very great. In 1997 the American Warmblood Registry opened registrations for ponies, following the European example, enabling breeders to cater to a specific market. In 2003, due to the large volume of ponies registered and seeking registration, the North American Sportpony Registry was reopened as an independent organization. It is now a hub for not only the sport pony community, but the pony community in general.

Unlike many breeds, the Sportpony can not be traced back to a specific breeder or stallion because it is not based on bloodline, but on physical type. An athletic physique in a small size is what sets it apart from other pony breeds and warmblood horses. Because of the strict documenting and grading policies, the ponies that have been allowed into the registry are of high quality.

== Uses ==
The Sportpony as a breed is required to be agile and athletic, and therefore should be able to participate in a variety of activities. The most common are the international disciplines of dressage, eventing, and jumping, as well as the less common discipline of driving. The intensity of each of these sports varies in regard to the ability of the rider. A young child or beginner rider should be able to use a Sportpony to learn on as well as be competitive in the show ring of his or her choice. An adult rider, with the proper instruction, should be able to take a pony from wherever their experience level is up to even the highest levels of competition.

The Sportpony should be able to transition from a family-friendly pet safe for young kids to ride on, to being a competitive mount for its adult owners in the show ring. Ideally, the Sportpony would have the competitive ability and aptitude of its larger relatives, but retain the unflappable pony personality. Its characteristic willing attitude and manageable size make it a mix of a competitive and companionable mount. It truly is the best of both worlds, combining a manageable height with excellent athleticism.

In recent years the Sportpony has made a large step out of the 4-H and Pony Club world and into the International stage as the mount of choice for small adult and youth competitors. There have been several instances of these small athletic equines competing against their much larger Warmblood relatives, and winning.

The biggest sport pony competition organized by the North American SportPony Registry, is the Sportpony Star Search, sponsored by Hayward Sportswear Ltd., A pony that wins the Star Search gets the usual trophy and cooler, as well as a $2,500.00 prize if it is a registered pony. To win, a pony must win its class at a qualifying show throughout the year and then compete with all the other qualifying ponies at the Royal Winter Fair in Toronto, Ontario. The winner becomes the Grand Champion Sportpony. There are multiple classes available at shows over the country to make it easier for everyone to have an opportunity to earn points.

== Notable individuals ==
Even though the registry is relatively new, it already has its own set of all-stars. Theodore O'Connor competed successfully at the highest level of Eventing. He finished 3rd in his first CCI**** the Rolex Kentucky Three Day and in the Pan American Games as a part of the US Eventing Team, he won not only team gold, but beat out many more experienced horses to win the individual gold as well. He was also short-listed for the 2008 Beijing Olympic Team.

In a very different arena of competition, dressage, the American-bred Connemara-Thoroughbred cross gelding Seldom Seen exemplified the abilities of a sport pony. Originally meant to be a Pony Club mount for the owner's daughter, Dressage star Lendon Gray ended up taking the pony to national status. Seldom Seen was the USDF Horse of the Year from the fourth level to Grand Prix. He also was AHSA Reserve Champion at 2nd level, AHSA Champion at 3rd, 4th, Prix St. Georges, and Intermidiare 1, as well as earning an individual gold medal at the U.S. Olympic Festival in Syracuse, NY. Seldom Seen was retired at the age of 26, after winning Grand Prix, Grand Prix Special, and Grand Prix Freestyle at Dressage at Devon. Throughout his competitive career, Seldom Seen was criticized as not appropriate for the show world, but he ended up being a notable ambassador for the breed.
