= American Bashkir Curly =

Breed of horse

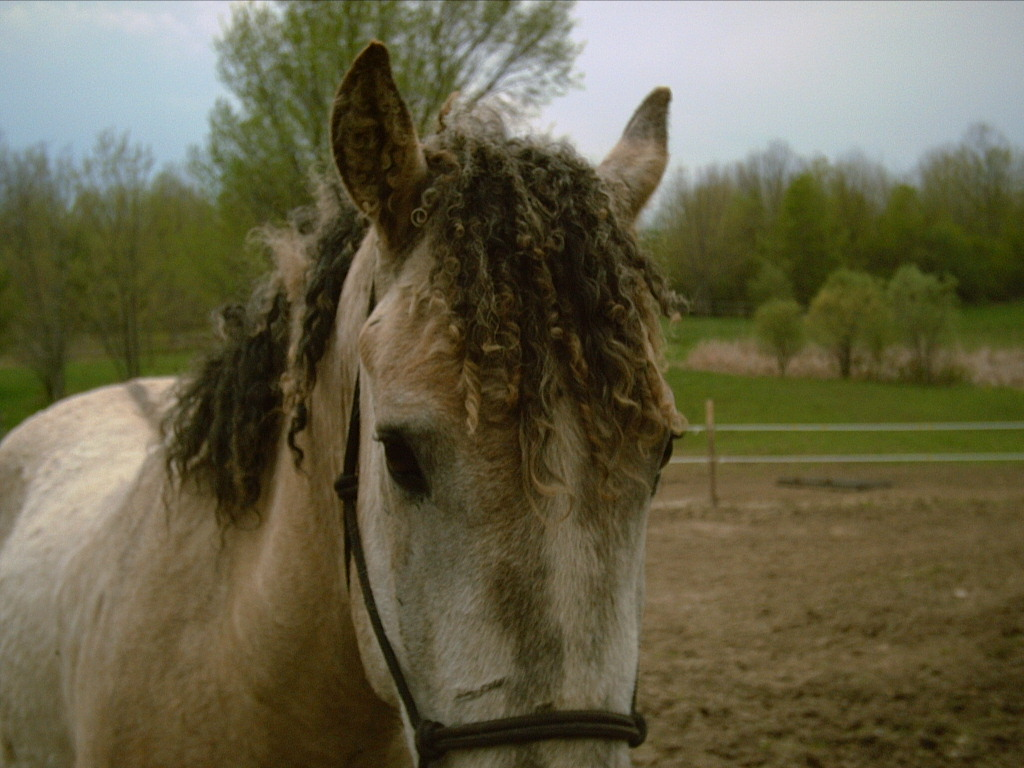
- Conservation status: FAO (2007): critical; DAD-IS (2023): at risk; Livestock Conservancy (2023): not listed
- Other names: American Curly Horse; North American Curly Horse
- Country of origin: Canada; United States

The American Bashkir Curly or North American Curly Horse is a North American breed of horse, characterized by an unusual curly coat of hair. It derives from American horses of Iberian origin, in which curly-coated individuals occasionally occur; it is unrelated to Asian horses such as the Bashkir and Lokai, which may also be curly-coated. The American Bashkir Curly has been extensively cross-bred with horses of other breeds, and varies widely in size and conformation; it may be of any color.

== History ==
The origins of the Curly horse is highly debated in the Curly community, but research is mostly still in progress. Disagreements of the Curly horse's history result in confusion of what the breed is, and what it should be called. ABCR members prefer "Bashkir Curly" while CSI and ICHO members lean towards "North American Curly". The addition or removal of 'Bashkir' to the breed name is highly debated. A 1990 study indicated that it is unlikely that the Bashkir horse, which also has a curly coat, is an ancestor.

One theory is that the origin of the breed is Iberian. It has been noted that foals of crossbred horses have curly hair. This suggests that the curly gene is dominant.

There are multiple theories for how the American Curly developed. The Curly horse was first documented in Eureka, Nevada, in the early 20th century by rancher John Damele and his sons. While Mustangs were a common sight, curly coated horses were unusual. Years later, the Dameles managed to catch one, broke it to ride and sold it, thus starting their relationship with the breed. In 1932, an unusually harsh winter hit the area, and come spring the only horses that could be found were the Curlies. This evidence of hardiness was noted by the Damele family, and they decided they should include more of these horses in their herd. After another harsh winter in 1951/52, the Dameles started to get serious about breeding these horses. They went out and found their foundation stallion, a two-year-old chestnut in one of the mustang herds. They called him Copper D. The Dameles did not care much for keeping the breed 'pure', and wanting to improve their horses, added some other blood to their herd. Among the stallions introduced were a Morgan, Ruby Red King AMHR 26101 and an Arabian, Nevada Red AHR 18125. These two stallions created many offspring for the Dameles, and are in hundreds of Curly horses' pedigrees today.

== Characteristics ==
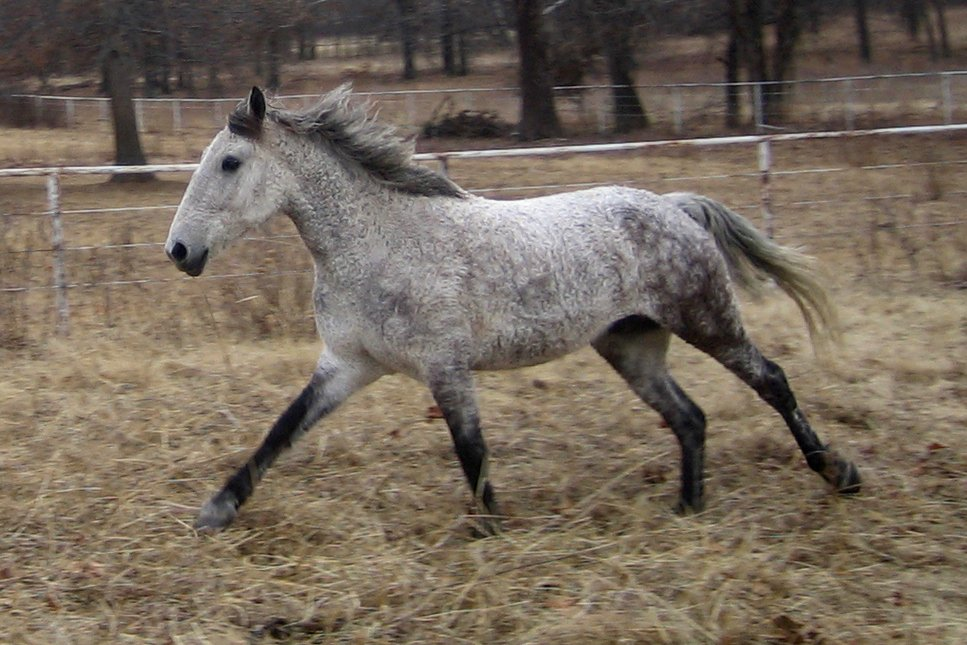
In full winter coat

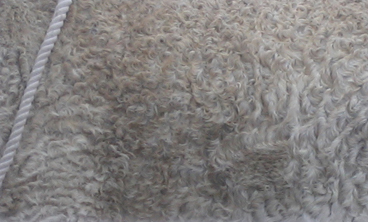
Characteristic winter coat

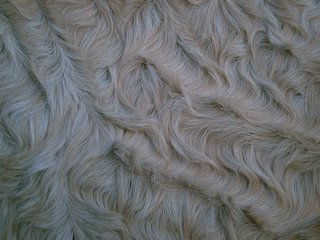
Closeup of winter coat

The Curlies are known for their calm, intelligent and friendly personality. They show an easily trainable temperament. They are also known for having a tough constitution and great stamina. Most people have found that the curlies enjoy being around people. The curlies are typically not flighty. They tend to do more reasoning than most breeds. They are very reliable and have a great work ethic.

=== Coat, mane and tail ===
The genetic mechanism that causes the curly coat defect in horses is not fully understood; it involves both dominant and recessive genetic mutations. The coat is often heavily curled in winter, and much less so in summer; unusually, the mane and tail also moult in summer. Some horses carry curly-coat genes but display little or no curliness; their offspring may be fully curly.

Curlies have split manes and are not braided or clipped when shown. Curlies are most commonly chestnut colored, but can be found in every color from standard bays, blacks, and greys, to appaloosa markings; from pinto patterns to dilute colors such as buckskin, roan, grulla, and cremello.

The care for the curly hair is simple with most people choosing to not comb the mane because the hair will lose its curliness. The manes are often trimmed to keep them from matting. The tails can be combed. Some people choose to collect the hair that is shed from the mane and tails in the spring. The hair is then donated to the ICHO Fiber Guild who use the hair for spinning. All of the proceeds go to ICHO Curly Research Efforts.

=== Hypoallergenic ===
Curlies are claimed to be the only hypoallergenic horse breed; most people allergic to horses can tolerate Curly horses without having an allergic reaction. Research indicates a protein is missing from the hair of Curlies which may be what causes allergic reactions to horses in people with allergies, but the study was never officially published. Members of the Curly community are working towards funding more research on the topic.

=== Build ===
The Curly has a characteristic long stride and bold movement. They have tough hooves, strong bones and exceptional endurance. Most Curlies stand between 14 and 16 hands, though they can range from miniature horses to draft horses, which are only allowed in two registries.

== Registries and organizations ==
The American Bashkir Curly Registry (ABCR) opened in 1971 with only 21 horses; as of May 2005 there were just over 4,000 Bashkir Curlies in the world, primarily in North America. They are the original standing Curly Registry, and have a closed stud book, only issuing new registrations to horses with two ABCR registered parents.

The International Curly Horse Organization (ICHO) began in 2000 and had over 800 horses registered in its North American Curly Horse Registry (as of October 2006). Horses within this registry are not referred to as "Bashkir Curlies". Although bloodlines (when available) are tracked, the ICHO registers horses based on visible curly traits rather than bloodlines.

Curly Sporthorse International (CSI) began in early 2003 to promote sport horse type Curly Horses, which are one of the more popular types of Curlies. CSI was created to support Curly owners and breeders in improvement of breeding stock, promotion, and marketing. The registry also sponsors Horse of the Year awards and USDF All Breed Awards for performance. CSI advocates evaluation of breeding stock and their offspring.

Canadian Curly Horse Association (CCHA) formed in 1993. This group is focused on community events in the Curly world, and spreading knowledge of the Curly horse.

== Uses ==
Though eye catching and unusual in the show ring, Curlies have the movement, endurance, and heart to excel in competition. Curlies have been shown at upper levels of dressage and show jumping, and others have proved the reliable mount and patient teacher for the weekend competitor. Curlies are characteristically quiet, level headed horses that make excellent first horses for supervised beginner riders. Curlies have carried horse-allergic riders from beginner status through ever more advanced stages of equestrianism. They have also been used for combined driving, western riding, ranch horses, trail horses, and companions for other horses. Some Curlies have been crossbred to gaited horses. About 10% of the crossbreds will do one of the ambling gaits such as the running walk, fox trot or the stepping pace, which is also called the "Curly shuffle". Curlies are not used for racing or high trotting showing.
