= Spanish Mustang =

American breed of horse

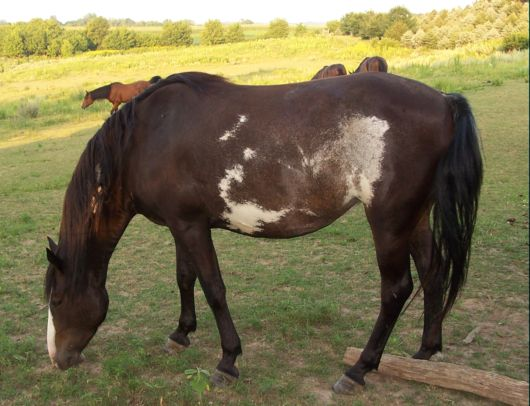
- Spanish Mustang mare
- Other names: Mesteño Americano, Cimarrón Virreinal de La Mesta, Bronco Misteño
- Country of origin: Developed in the Americas from foundation bloodstock tracing to Spain

Traits
- Distinguishing features: Compact, sturdy, Spanish type

The Spanish Mustang is an American horse breed descended from horses brought from Spain during the early conquest of the Americas. They are classified within the larger grouping of the Colonial Spanish horse, a type that today is rare in Spain. By the early 20th century, most of the once-vast herds of mustangs that had descended from the Spanish horses had been greatly reduced in size. Seeing that these horses were on the brink of extinction, some horseman began making efforts to find and preserve the remaining "Spanish Mustangs" drawing stock from feral and Native American herds, as well as ranch stock. The breed was one of the first to be part of a concerted preservation effort for horses of Spanish phenotype, and a breed registry was founded in 1957.

The Spanish Mustang as a modern domesticated breed differs from the feral free-roaming mustang. The latter animals are descended from both Spanish horses and other domesticated horses escaped or released from various sources; many run wild in Herd Management Areas (HMAs) of the western United States, currently managed by the Bureau of Land Management (BLM). Some feral herds also exist in Canada. DNA studies indicate that Spanish breeding and type does still exist in some feral Mustang herds, including those on the Cerbat HMA (near Kingman, Arizona), Pryor Mountain HMA (Montana), Sulphur HMA (Utah), and Kiger HMA (Oregon).

== History ==
The Colonial Spanish Horse developed from animals first brought from the Iberian Peninsula to the Americas during the conquest and establishment of the Spanish colony of New Spain in what today is Mexico. As the conquest of Mexico progressed during the 16th century, horse herds spread north and crossed the Rio Grande. Over the next one hundred years, horses in the Americas were stolen and traded by the Apache, Comanche, and later the Utes and Shoshone to various tribes across the Great Plains and Rocky Mountains.

On the brink of extinction in the early part of this century, the Spanish Mustang is one of the first breeds developed from a planned conservation program to save the descendants of these Spanish horses. This effort is mostly attributed to Robert E. Brislawn of Oshoto, Wyoming, and his brother Ferdinand L. Brislawn of Gusher, Utah. Credit for the preservation effort also goes to Gilbert Jones and Ilo Belsky. They gathered horses from feral Mustang herds, Native American herds and ranch stock from throughout the west, chosen because they had a phenotype that indicates Spanish ancestry. Two full brothers, Buckshot and Ute, were among the first foundation stallions, sired by a buckskin stallion named Monty and out of Ute Reservation blood on the dam's side. Monty, captured in 1927 in Utah, escaped back to the wild in 1944, taking his mares with him. He was never recaptured. Ultimately, the Brislawns and Lawrence P. Richards formed a registry, the Spanish Mustang Registry, incorporated in 1957. Due to assorted differences of opinion on what horses to accept into the registry, Jones formed the Southwest Spanish Mustang Association in 1977, and other offshoot registries formed later. A 2006 study found that the Spanish Mustang, as well as horses from the Sulphur Springs and Kiger HMAs have DNA haplotypes that indicate origin from horses of the Iberian Peninsula.

== Characteristics ==
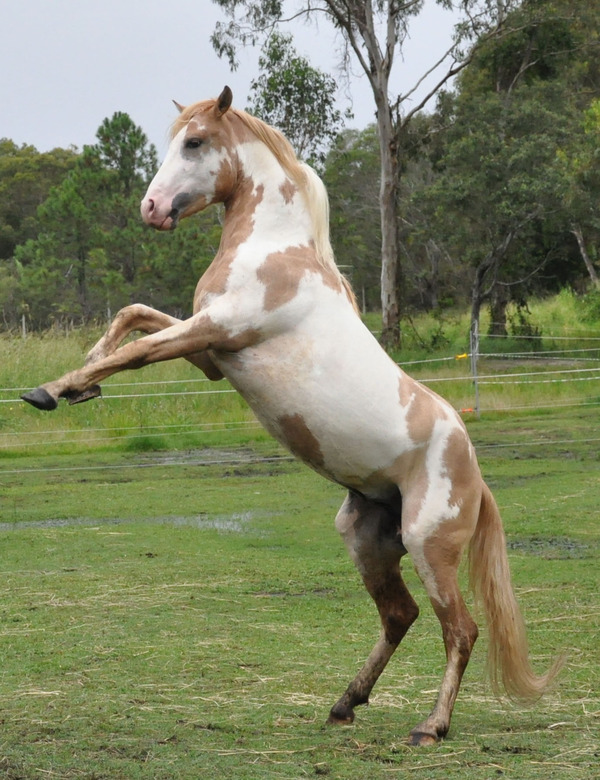
Spanish Mustang

Spanish Mustang stands from 13.2 to 15 hands (54 to 60 inches, 137 to 152 cm) in height, with horses over 15 hands not favored. They weigh between 650 and 1,100 pounds (290 and 500 kg). They are smooth muscled with short backs, rounded rumps and low-set tails. The coupling is strong and horses are to be well balanced and smoothly built with an "uphill" build. The girth is deep, with a well laid back shoulder and fairly pronounced withers. They possess a straight or concave facial profile and wide foreheads. Necks are fairly well crested in mares and geldings and heavily crested in mature stallions. Chests are moderately narrow but well-defined. Chestnuts are small or missing altogether, particularly on the rear legs. Ergots are small or absent. Feet are round and hard and legs are to be of correct conformation, though hind legs may be set under a bit. Cannons are short and bone is rounded. Some individuals are gaited, with a range of different footfalls accepted. Paddling or winging out are not a fault unless there is interference or it is caused by a lack of straightness in the leg.

Spanish Mustangs exist in many colors, due to the wide range of colors in their Spanish ancestors. They are commonly found in bay, chestnut, black and gray. Other colors seen less commonly include the Appaloosa and paint patterns and solid colors such as grulla, buckskin, palomino, cremello, isabella, roan and perlino.

Spanish Mustangs are known for their stamina and hardiness. The breed is known for its long-distance ability, and is ridden by some endurance riders. The Spanish Mustang is also used to compete in a variety of English and Western riding events.

== See also ==
- Sorraia
