= Colonial Spanish horse =

American breed of horse

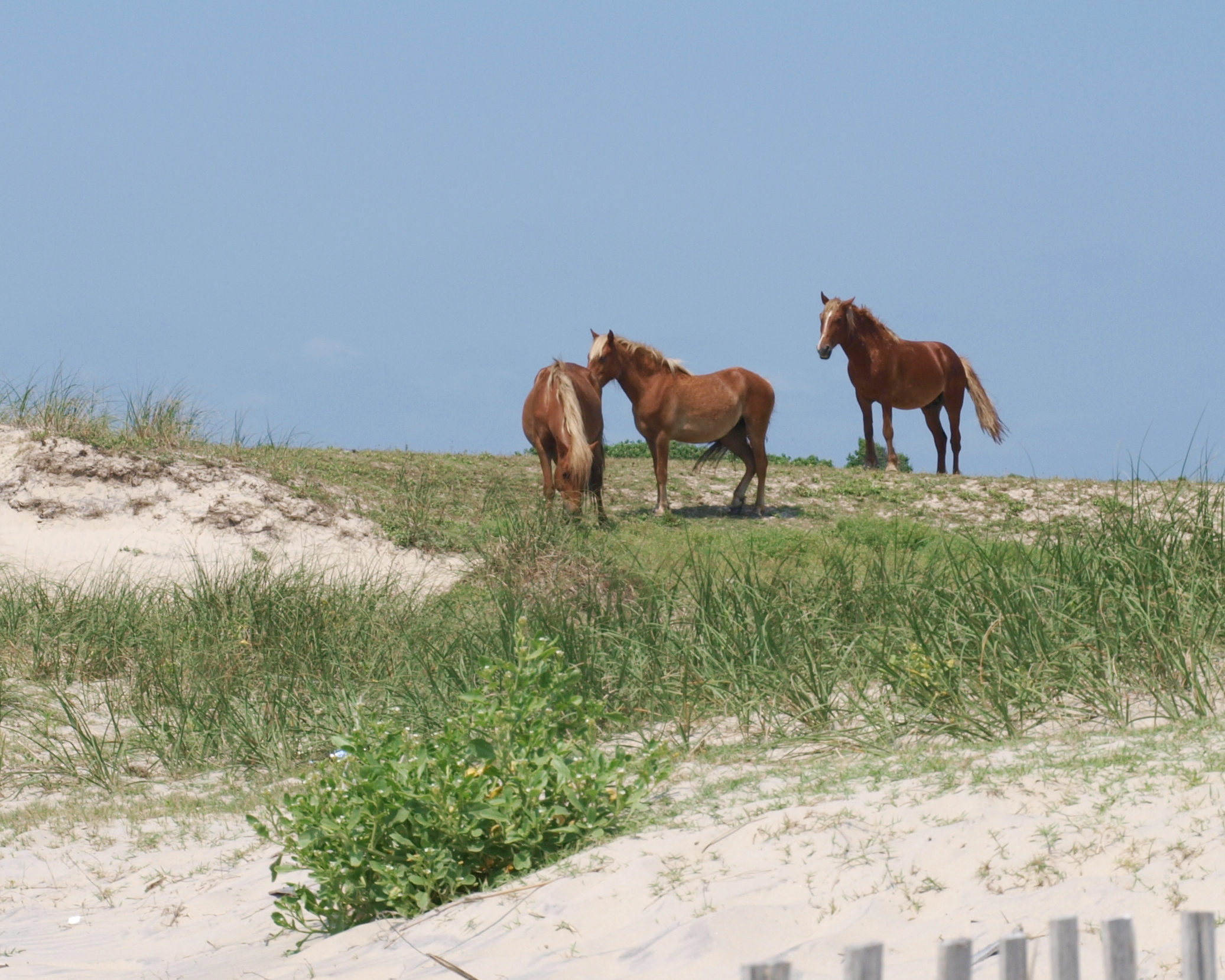
- The Banker horse is an example of a Colonial Spanish horse

Traits
- Distinguishing features: Small size, Spanish type, blood markers indicating origins in the Iberian Peninsula

Colonial Spanish horse is a term for a group of horse breed and feral populations descended from the original Iberian horse stock brought from Spain to the Americas. The ancestral type from which these horses descend was a product of the horse populations that blended between the Iberian horse and the North African Barb. The term encompasses many strains or breeds now found primarily in North America. The status of the Colonial Spanish horse is considered threatened overall with seven individual strains specifically identified. (Note: Those identified are the Baca-Chica, Banker Horse, Choctaw, Florida Cracker, Marsh Tacky, Santa Cruz, and Wilbur-Cruce.) The horses are registered by several entities.

The Colonial Spanish horse, a general classification popularized by D. Philip Sponenberg, is not synonymous with the Spanish Mustang, the name given to a specific standardized breed derived from the first concerted effort of conservationists in the United States to preserve horses of Colonial Spanish Type. Colonial Spanish horse blood markers have been found in some mustang populations. Small groups of horses of Colonial Spanish horse type have been located in various groups of ranch-bred, mission, and Native American horses, mostly among those in private ownership.

== Characteristics ==
Colonial Spanish horses are generally small; the usual height is around 14 hands (56 inches, 142 cm), and most vary from 13.2 to 14 hands (54 to 56 inches, 137 to 142 cm). Weight varies with height, but most are around 700 to 800 pounds (320 to 360 kg). Their heads vary somewhat between long, finely made to shorter and deeper, generally having straight to concave (rarely slightly convex) foreheads and a nose that is straight or slightly convex. The muzzle is usually very fine, and from the side the upper lip is usually longer than the lower, although the teeth meet evenly. Nostrils are usually small and crescent shaped. They typically have narrow but deep chests, with the front legs leaving the body fairly close together. When viewed from the front, the front legs join the chest in an "A" shape rather than straight across as in most other modern breeds that have wider chests. The withers are usually sharp instead of low and meaty. The croup is sloped, and the tail is characteristically set low on the body. From the rear view they are usually "rafter hipped" meaning the muscling of the hip tapers up so the backbone is the highest point. Hooves are small and upright rather than flat.

== History in the Americas ==
Horses first returned to the Americas with the conquistadors, beginning with Columbus, who imported horses from Spain to the West Indies on his second voyage in 1493. Domesticated horses came to the mainland with the arrival of Cortés in 1519. By 1525, Cortés had imported enough horses to create a nucleus of horse-breeding in Mexico. Horses arrived in South America beginning in 1531, and by 1538 there were horses in Florida. From these origins, horses spread throughout the Americas. By one estimate there were at least 10,000 free-roaming horses in Mexico by 1553.

In 2010, the Colonial Spanish mustang was voted the official state horse of North Carolina.

== Modern horses ==
Many gaited horse and stock horse breeds in the United States descend from Spanish horses, but only a few bloodlines are considered to be near-pure descendants of original Spanish stock. Though many are described as horse breeds, it can be debated they are separate breeds or multiple strains of a single large breed. The Livestock Conservancy lists them as one breed, but also calls them "a group of closely related breeds" Various bloodlines or groups of Colonial Spanish horses are registered a number of different Associations.

While some bands of modern mustangs have evidence of ancestry from the original Spanish imports, genetic analysis indicates that many free-ranging horses in the Great Basin descend from later breeds of draft horse, cavalry mounts, and other saddle horses. Where they have been found to have descended from the original Spanish horses, the Bureau of Land Management (BLM) and other agencies attempt to preserve them. Blood typing, along with phenotype and historical documentation have been used to confirm significant Spanish ancestry of a few BLM managed herds. In 1985, the BLM awarded a grant to the University of California, Davis, to conduct a three-year study on mustang genetics, including the percentage of original Spanish blood. Ann T. Bowling and R. W. Touchberry did not find much evidence of Spanish genetics in the Great Basin horses tested, but follow up work by Gus Cothran, then of University of Kentucky, carried on the study and found Spanish markers in the Pryor Mountain and Cerbat herds outside the Great Basin, and Sulphur Springs herd within it, later confirming the findings for the Sulphur Springs herd through mtDNA sequencing analysis. (Note: Cothran may have found Spanish markers in other herds listed by the BLM as having been determined by "genetic analysis" to be similar to Iberian breeds. However, when Cothran left Kentucky for Texas A&M University, he began using microsatellite DNA analysis to determine genetic diversity of feral herds rather than blood typing, but the DNA analysis was less accurate in determining ancestry.) Some breeders and horse associations have used blood typing results to prove or disprove horses being of Spanish ancestry, but some horses of Spanish phenotype may not carry the expected Iberian blood markers. Conversely, some horses that lack Spanish type, such as certain strains of the American Quarter Horse, may have blood markers but not the proper phenotype.

Colonial Spanish horses include numerous strains, which may be feral populations or standardized breeds:

- Abaco Barb (extinct since 2015)
- Banker horse (eastern US; Corolla and Shackleford Islands)
- Carolina Marsh Tacky
- Florida Cracker Horse
- Baca-Chica
- Belsky horse
- Havapai (Grand Canyon Strain)
- Spanish Mustang.
- Santa Cruz Island horse
- Wilbur-Cruce Mission horse
- Populations of mustangs considered to be Colonial Spanish strains:
  - Kiger mustang
  - Pryor Mountain mustang
  - Sulphur Springs mustang
  - Cerbat mustang
- Tribal Horses
  - Chickasaw horse
  - Choctaw horse
- Chincoteague pony (Assateague horse) – dubious, but widely asserted
- Gila Bend mustang

A number of breeds in Latin America with Iberian DNA markers are of Spanish type and origin. (Note: This include the Argentine Criollo, Brazilian Criollo, Campolina, Chilean Criollo, Chilote horse, Mangalarga, Mangalarga Marchador, Pantaneiro, Paso Fino, Peruvian Paso, and Venezuelan Spanish horse.) Many of these breeds come from different North American foundation bloodstock, and some have haplotypes not found in North America.

== Sources ==
- Bennett, Deb (1998). Conquerors : the roots of New World horsemanship (1st ed.). Solvang, Calif.: Amigo Publications. ISBN 0-9658533-0-6.
- National Research Council (2013). Using Science to Improve the BLM Wild Horse and Burro Program: A Way Forward (Report). Washington D.C.: The National Academies Press.
- The Livestock Conservancy. "Conservation Priority". The Livestock Conservancy.
- Sponenberg, D. Philip. "North American Colonial Spanish Horse Update July 2011". Center for America's First Horse.
