= Iberian horse =

Horses breeds native to Spain and Portugal

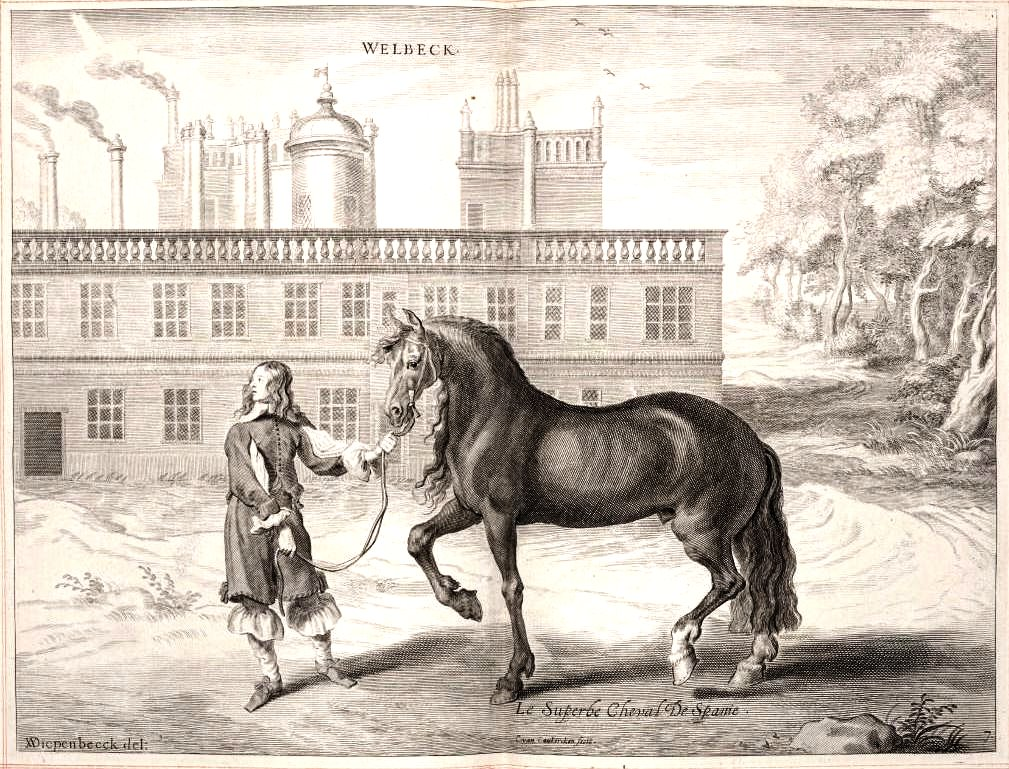
1743 engraving depicting an Iberian horse

The Iberian horse is a designation given to a number of horse breeds native to the Iberian Peninsula. At present, some breeds are officially recognized by the FAO, while other horses believed to be native to the peninsula are not. Likewise, some modern breeds are understood from mitochondrial DNA to be descended from historic landraces, while others have origins outside the Iberian peninsula. The remaining FAO-recognized breeds are of well-known foreign blood, or are recently developed breeds.

== History ==
Wild horses have been present in Iberia since the Middle Pleistocene, probably by at least 600,000 years ago. Sequencing of ancient DNA indicates that Late Pleistocene-Holocene wild horses native to the Iberian Peninsula from at least around 27,000 years ago onwards belonged to a highly distinctive lineage of wild horses isolated from other European wild horse populations, that is less closely related to modern domestic horses than Przewalski's horse (as well as the extinct Siberian horse Equus lenensis) is, which one study estimated diverged from their common ancestor around 285-335,000 years ago. These wild horses persisted in the Iberian Peninsula up until the Iron Age, around 500-350 BC. Modern domestic horses were introduced into Iberia during the Bronze Age, around the 2nd millennium BC, probably by around 1850 BC. While interbreeding between Iberian wild horses and domestic horses is documented genetically, the genetic contribution from Iberian wild horses to post-Iron Age Iberian domestic horses is negligible.

Roman writers mention in Hispania war horses, wild horses, "tieldones" and small "asturcones'" in the north.

Two distinct phenotypes of Iberian horse were identified in early research: so-called "Celtic" ponies, centered in the Cantabrian Range in the north, and the horses of the south, represented today by the Andalusian and Carthusian, Lusitano, Marismeño and related breeds. The northern breeds include the Garrano, Pottok, and Asturcon, all of which are considered endangered breeds.

Throughout history, Iberian horses have been influenced by many different peoples and cultures who occupied Spain, including the Celts, the Carthaginians, the Romans, various Germanic tribes and the Arabs. The Iberian horse was identified as a talented war horse as early as 450 BCE. Mitochondrial DNA studies of the modern horses of the Iberian Peninsula and Barb horse of North Africa present convincing evidence that horses crossed the Strait of Gibraltar in both directions and crossbred. It is not possible to determine which of these strains is the older one, and both trace to the Roman era, far earlier than the Muslim conquest of Spain that is commonly assumed to mark the beginning of such crossbreeding.

At one time, the northern Celtic horses were thought to have ancestry related to the Exmoor pony of the British Isles, but subsequent Mitochondrial DNA studies revealed that the populations are not closely related until there was some documented admixture between Exmoors and Celtic horses in the early-to-mid 20th century. If anything, the Iberian breeds are characterized by a "consistent absence of geographical structure".

When the Spanish reached the Americas in the late 15th century, they brought various horses of Iberian ancestry with them. Their descendants have been designated as the Colonial Spanish Horse and have contributed significantly to a number of horse breeds in both North and South America.

In modern times, stallions from outside breeds were crossed on local breeds, such as the Exmoor pony stallions brought to the area, or for example, the heavy Burguete and Jaca Navarra breeds crossed on foreign stallions to create a bigger animal more useful for the horsemeat industry.

In Spain and Portugal, the 1980s marked the start of efforts to bring back several of the Northern Iberian breeds from extinction, some of which were down to a few dozen individuals. The Cartusian strain of Pure Spanish (Andalusian) horse was also endangered, with a breeding population of about 150 animals. In 2005, a distinctive primitive, feral breed was identified inside Doñana National Park, the Retuerta horse (Caballo de las retuertas).

== See also ==
- List of Iberian horse breeds
- Sable Island horse
