= Pryor Mountain mustang =

American breed of horse

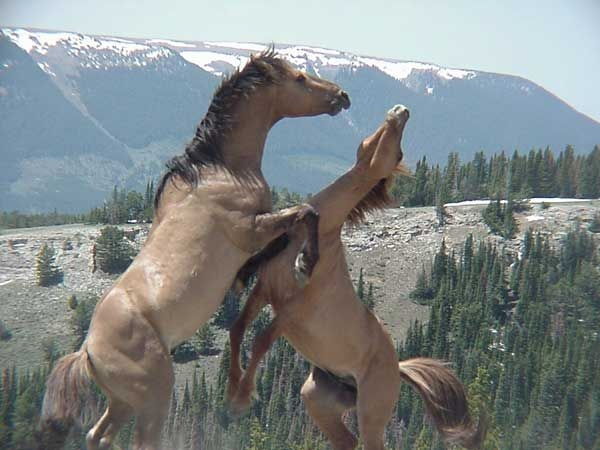
- Pryor Mountain mustang stallions
- Other names: Pryor mustang
- Country of origin: North America

Traits
- Distinguishing features: Small, compact, good bone, very hardy

The Pryor Mountain mustang is a substrain of mustang considered to be genetically unique and one of the few strains of horses verified by DNA analysis to be descended from the original Colonial Spanish horses brought to the Americas by the Spanish. They live on the Pryor Mountains Wild Horse Range located in the Pryor Mountains of Montana and Wyoming in the United States, and are the only mustang herd remaining in Montana, and one of fourteen in Wyoming. They are protected by the Wild and Free-Roaming Horses and Burros Act of 1971 (WFRHBA) and managed by the Bureau of Land Management (BLM), who has set the optimum herd number at 120 animals. Genetic studies have revealed that the herd exhibits a high degree of genetic diversity and a low degree of inbreeding, and BLM has acknowledged the genetic uniqueness of the herd. Pryor Mountain Mustangs are relatively small horses, exhibit a natural ambling gait, and domesticated Pryor Mountain mustangs are known for their strength, sure-footedness and stamina. The Pryor Mountains Wild Horse Range is one of the most accessible areas to view feral horse herds in the United States and tourism to the area has increased in recent years.

Feral horses are documented as living in the Pryor Mountains by the early 1700s, although they may have been there since the late 1600s. By the late 1800s, thousands of feral horses inhabited the area. In the early 1900s, many of the unbranded horses were rounded up, to allow domesticated livestock to graze the range without competition, and by 1964 there were only around 200 horses left. In 1964, the BLM announced that the horses would be removed altogether, to the outrage of the public. The controversy continued until 1968, when the BLM was legally stopped from removing all of the horses, and the area declared a Wild Horse Refuge. After the 1971 signing of the WFRHBA, the BLM spent the 1980s and 1990s conducting population studies and developing management and adoption policies; during this time, numerous genetic studies were also completed.

The BLM management of the herd has included improvements to the range to give the horses additional access to water, and numerous roundups that have resulted in the removal and adoption of hundreds of horses to private individuals, including 57 horses in 2009, 45 horses and foals in 2012, and 18 in 2015. Once again, every horse captured was adopted. Another gather was slated to begin in September 2018, with 17 horses identified for removal. However, it was cancelled amidst concerns that it would have a detrimental impact on herd genetics.

== Characteristics ==
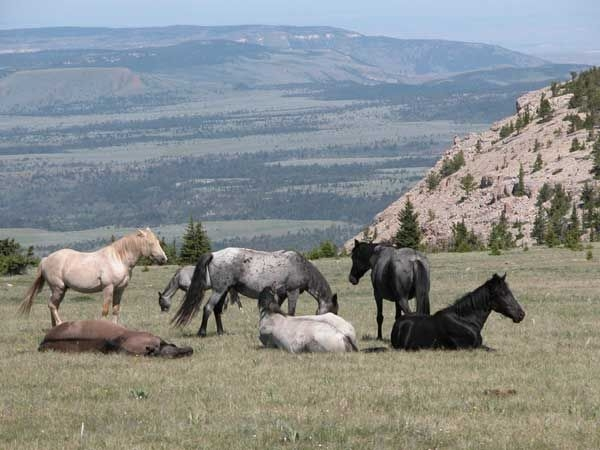
A herd of Pryor mustangs

The Pryor Mountain mustang has a very specific conformation type. The breed generally stands 13 to 15 hands (52 to 60 inches, 132 to 152 cm) high, with an average of 14 to 14.2 hands (56 to 58 inches, 142 to 147 cm). The horses weigh 700 to 800 pounds (320 to 360 kg) on the range, and more if raised in captivity. They exhibit a wide range of solid colors, including bay, black, chestnut, dun, grullo, and blue or red roan. Buckskin coloring is rare but does occur, and pinto coloring can be minimally expressed. The dun-colored horses on the range exhibit primitive markings such as dorsal stripes, transverse stripes across the withers, and horizontal "zebra" stripes on the back of the forelegs. The Pryor Mountains horse's body is heavy, with strong bones. Manes and tails tend to be long, and the horse's winter coat is very heavy and often curly. The head is convex (sometimes called a "Roman nose) or straight, with wide-set eyes, hooked ears, and a broad forehead that tapers well to the muzzle. The front teeth meet evenly, the upper lip is usually longer than the lower, and the nostrils are small and crescent shaped. The neck is medium in length, and most of the animals have only five lumbar vertebrae (an anatomical feature common in primitive horses)—although some have a fifth and sixth vertebrae which are fused. The horse's shoulders are long and sloping, the withers are prominent, and chests are medium to narrow in width. The croup is generally sloped, and tail-set is low. The hooves are large and very hard.

Some Pryor Mountain mustangs exhibit a natural ambling gait. They are generally intelligent, strong, and sure-footed, and exhibit great stamina. Like all feral horses, they generally avoid human contact, are distrustful, and are easily spooked. However, once they are familiar with an individual, they can exhibit a strong social bond with that individual. Pryor Mountains horses can be broken and ridden, and trained to do any task a domesticated horse can perform. Trained Pryor Mountains horses have a calm temperament, and are alert on trails.

The horses form bands or "harems", in which a single stallion mates and controls a group of about six mares. Another eight to 10 "bachelor" stallions accompany the band at a distance, hoping to win control of it from the stallion or mate with mares.

== History ==
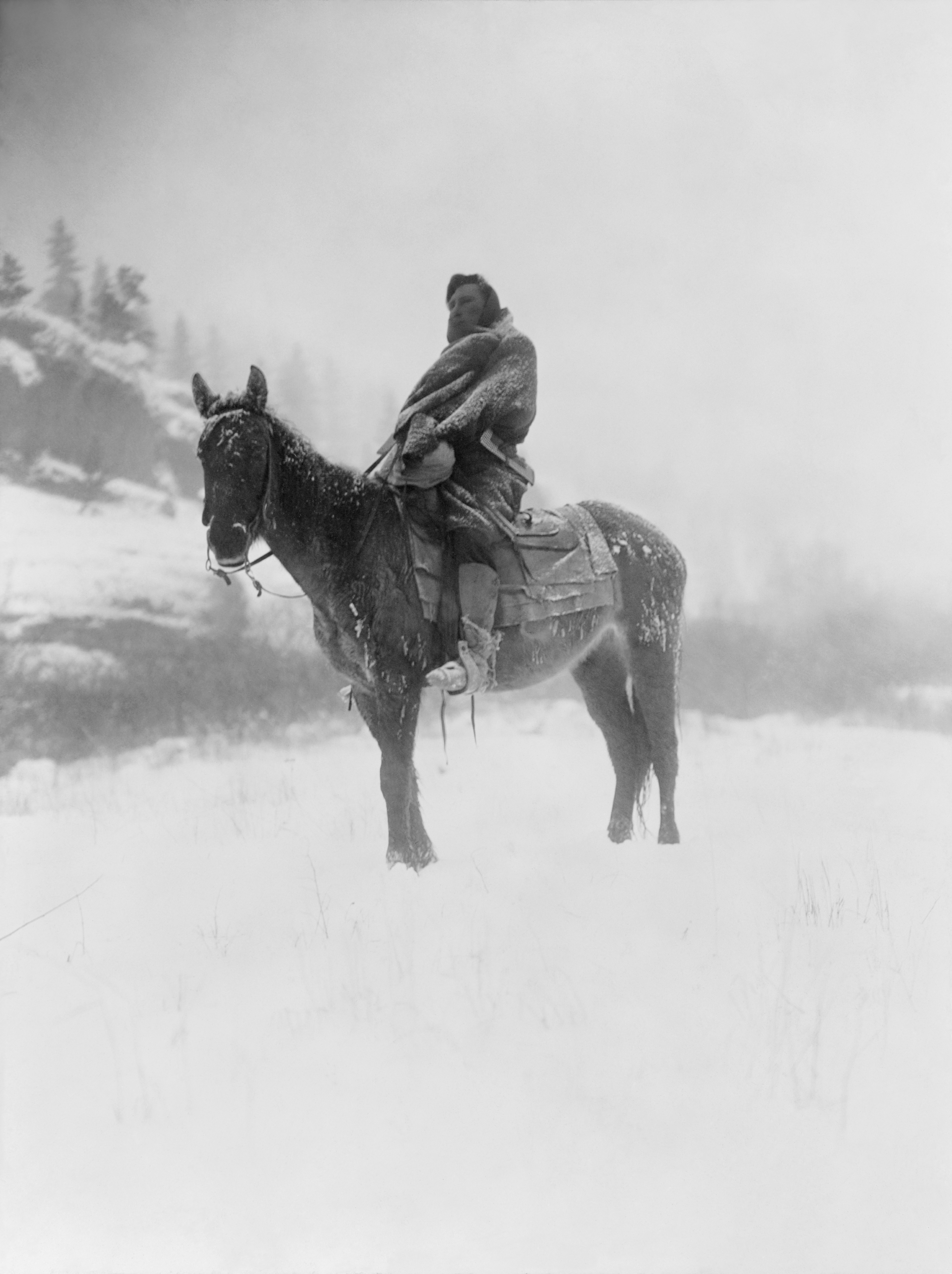
A Crow scout on horseback in the Pryor Mountains in the early 1900s

Historians and scientists speculate that feral horses have lived on and near Pryor Mountains since at least the late 1600s. Tradition of the Crow people maintains that the horses came to the area by about 1725. The Eastern Shoshone also inhabited the region during the 1700s. Non-Indian explorers found native people in possession of large numbers of horses as early as 1743.

Thousands of feral horses lived in the area by the time American pioneers began settling near the Pryor Mountains in the late 1800s. Between then and the 1930s, many domesticated horses were turned loose on the range, accidentally or on purpose; domesticated stallions were turned out to mate with mares on the range with the goal of producing cavalry remounts for the military. With passage of the Taylor Grazing Act of 1934, cattle and other horses were allowed to graze in the area, and by 1946, the BLM was formed. Through the 1940s, there were no protections for the wild horses on the range, and loose, unbranded horses were routinely rounded up so as to not compete with cattle for forage. Some were sold to slaughter, others kept for riding. However, with the passage of the Wild Horse Annie Act in 1959, motor vehicles were prohibited from being used to capture, harass or chase wild horses. By 1964, there were approximately 200 horses remaining in the area, which were seen as a "symbol of the Old West" by local citizens. That year, the BLM announced its decision to remove all horses from the Pryor Mountains and disperse the herd through public auctions, a move that was strongly opposed by the public. Public opposition to the plan succeeded in delaying any movement against the horses.

By 1968, the wild herd were concentrated mostly on BLM lands owing to previous roundups and construction of boundary fences. That year, the BLM again stated its intention to remove the herds, this time with the possibility of returning a small number (either 15 or 35) to the range. In response to the new announcement, the Pryor Mountain Wild Horse Association (PMWHA) was formed with the goal of preventing the roundup, and began working in concert with larger organizations such as the International Society for the Protection of Animals. The BLM argued that the horses were being removed because they were likely to starve, as they had overgrazed their environment, while the PMWHA argued the degradation of the range was not due to the horses and that in fact they were in no danger of starving. The organization further charged that the BLM was acting at the behest of other state and federal organizations who wished to see the horses removed, rather than acting in line with public opinion. The PMWHA was also concerned with the effect that the penning would have on the feral horses.

The battle over the Pryor Mountain herd moved to the national level on July 11, 1968, when ABC broadcast a special on the horses on the evening news. The public reacted with outrage, and the BLM responded that "no decision had yet been made regarding the horses." However, by the end of August, a trap to collect the horses had been completed. At the same time, the BLM was unresponsive to efforts by members of the public, senators and officials from the Humane Society of the United States to ascertain final plans regarding the horses. Because of this, court proceedings were begun, and on August 27, 1968, a US District Court judge made a decision that had the result of barring the BLM from removing the horses from the range. On September 9, 1968, the Secretary of the Interior, Stewart L. Udall, declared the area inhabited by the Pryor Mountain mustangs as the Pryor Mountain Wild Horse Refuge (PMWHR), in a decision later noted in the Congressional Record. After the creation of the refuge the BLM appointed a committee to study the area and make recommendations regarding appropriate herd numbers. The committee, which met in late 1968 and early 1969, was made up of range and wildlife experts, local citizens interested in the herds and representatives from several federal, state and private organizations. A boundary adjustment was made to the refuge, adding some land in Wyoming. The final report of the committee, submitted in June 1969, was that the horses were not in danger of starvation, that overgrazing was likely due to domestic sheep who utilized the land decades earlier, and that horses were the most likely of any species to be able to survive and thrive in the Pryor Mountain environment. On December 18, 1971, the Wild and Free-Roaming Horses and Burros Act of 1971 (WFRHBA) was signed into law by President Richard M. Nixon. The Act made it a crime for anyone to harass or kill feral horses or burros on federal land, required the departments of the Interior and Agriculture to protect the animals, required studies of the animals' habits and habitats, and permitted public land to be set aside for their use. The Bureau of Land Management and Forest Service were jointly charged with responsibility for administrating the Act. The National Park Service was also involved in the management of the land. These federal agencies were limited to managing horses only on public lands where "wild horses were documented as being 'presently found' at the time of the passage of the Act in 1971."

== Genetics ==
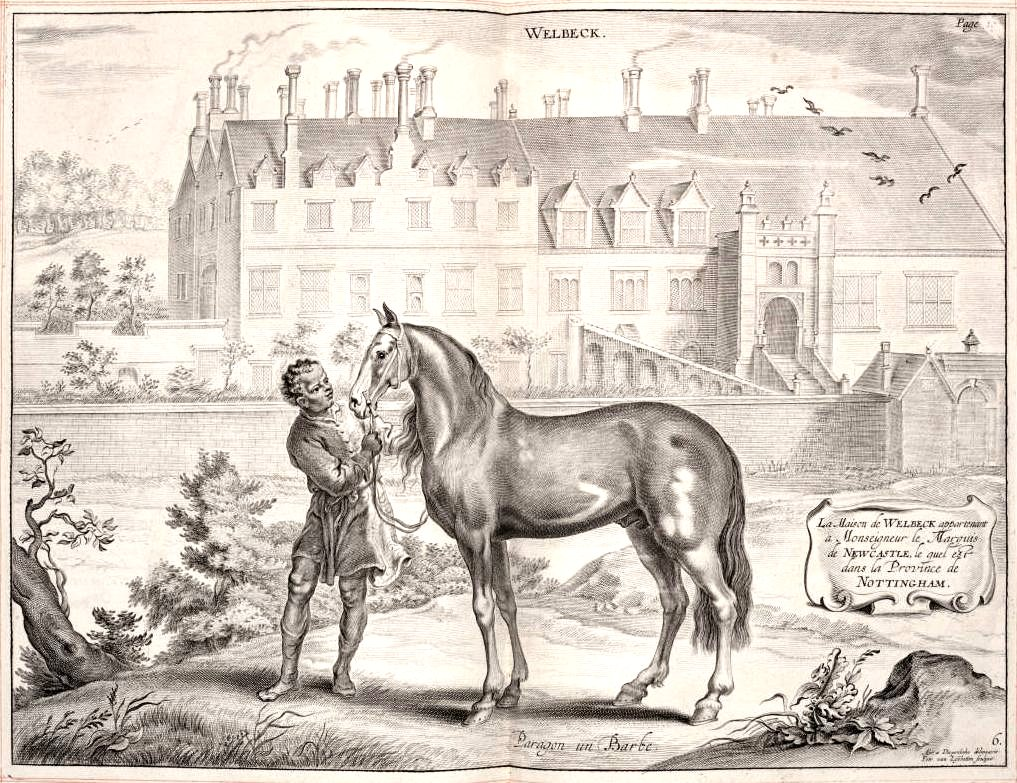
A 17th-century engraving of a Barb horse

It was widely believed that the Pryor Mountains horses were direct descendants of the Barb horses brought to North America by Juan de Oñate's expedition to explore America north of the Rio Grande in the early 1600s. Bloodlines may also include American Saddlebred, Canadian, Irish Hobby, and Tennessee Walking horses. In the early 1900s, stallions of Thoroughbred and Arabian ancestry were also turned out onto the range. However, the breeding of the Pryor Mountain herd was in dispute for many years. One horseman hired by the federal government during the 1920s to round up excess feral horses on the range stated, "The whole country around was overrun with thousands of homesteaders' horses ... but this little band ... were, and are, the genuine Spanish horses and there were about 70 head. I did not try to get them and hoped that no one else ever would." Other people claimed that the horses were nothing more than local domestic horses which had escaped to the wild. In 1992, equine geneticist Dr. E. Gus Cothran conducted genetic studies on the herd, and concluded that their primary bloodlines did descend from Spanish Barbs. Since no genetic variants were observed not also seen in domestic horse breeds, in 2010 Cothran also concluded the horses were not a unique species which had survived in North America from prehistoric times. Rather, they were linear descendants of the Spanish Barb, with some evidence of genetic similarity to light racing and riding breeds. The genetic tests also revealed that the Pryor Mountains horses carried a rare allele variant known as "Qac" that only Spanish horses brought to the Americas also carried. Dr. D. Phillip Sponenberg of the Virginia–Maryland Regional College of Veterinary Medicine, an expert on horse breeds, observed that, physically, the horses conform to the Colonial Spanish Horse type.

Genetic studies have also revealed that the herd exhibits a high degree of genetic diversity, and BLM has acknowledged the genetic uniqueness of the herd. Because of the unique genetic makeup of the Pryor Mountains mustang herd, Cothran concluded in 1992 that "the Pryor herd may be the most significant wild-horse herd remaining in the United States." Sponenberg agreed, noting, "[These animals] don't exist anywhere else." This herd was the subject of the 1995 documentary film Cloud: Wild Stallion of the Rockies and its sequel, the 2003 documentary film Cloud's Legacy: The Wild Stallion Returns.

Management of the Pryor Mountains horse herd has focused on fulfilling the Free-Roaming Wild Horse and Burro Act's requirement that BLM maintain a "thriving natural ecological balance". In general, BLM initially focused on how many horses the range could support and in maintaining conformity to the Pryor Mountains standard. However, with the development of DNA testing in the mid 1980s, the focus changed to include maintaining the herd's genetic viability. In 1988, researchers at Washington State University authored a paper which raised concern that the herd exhibited a lack of genetic diversity, and could be suffering from genetic drift and/or a population bottleneck. BLM contracted with Cothran (then at the College of Veterinary Medicine at the University of Kentucky, but now at the Texas A&M College of Veterinary Medicine & Biomedical Sciences) to take random genetic samples of the herd in 1994, 1997, and 2001. Cothran's analysis found "no evidence of a bottleneck". Genetic diversity was actually above the mean for feral horse herds in the United States, and just below the mean for domesticated breeds. The BLM, however, interpreted these studies in 2009 to indicate that the genetic diversity of the Pryor Mountains herd is "well above" the mean for domestic breeds. Cothran considered the herd to be in genetic equilibrium, although he cautioned that a minimum of 120 breeding-age animals should be kept on the range to maintain the genetic health of the herd. Research by biologists and veterinarians at Colorado State University, the University of Kentucky, and other colleges found that there is little inbreeding in bands, as the stallions tend to drive off colts when they are about two years old.

== Management ==
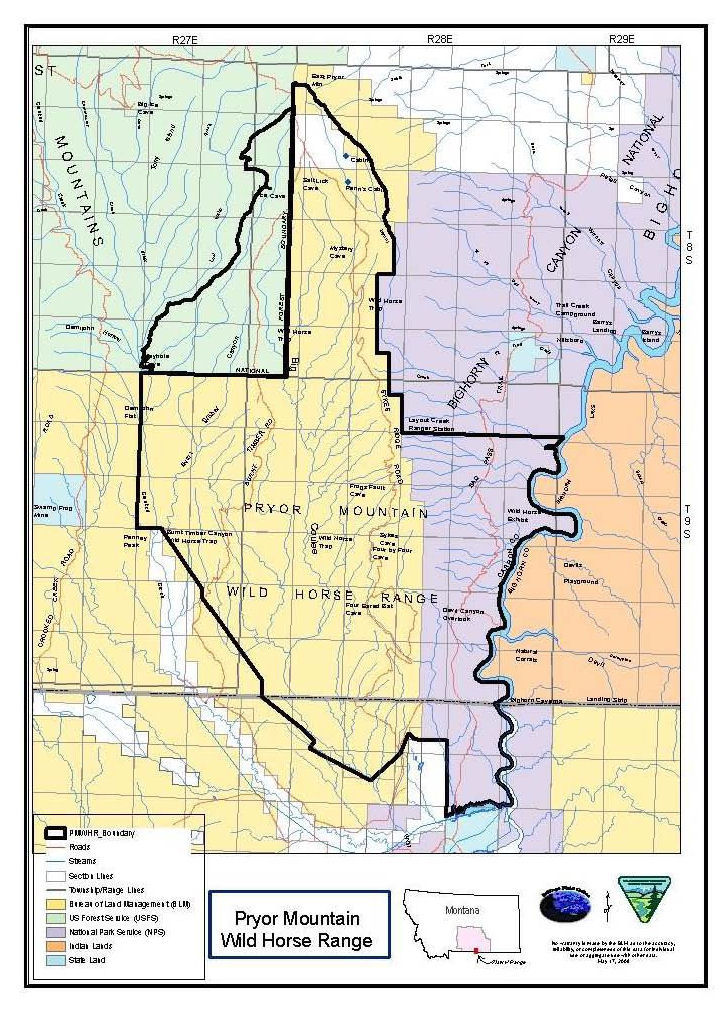
Bureau of Land Management map of the Pryor Mountains Wild Horse Range, showing BLM, Crow Nation, Forest Service, National Park Service, private, and state lands.

BLM counts the herd visually about every four years by flying over the range, reporting on each animal found, and using statistical methods to correct for historic undercounting and other problems. In 1984, BLM set the maximum carrying capacity of the Pryor Mountains Wild Horse Range at 121 adult animals, and revised this to 95 adult animals in 1992.

For years, BLM had also allowed any horse to be adopted from the range. Since adopters favored "pretty" horses, the color genetics of the herd altered so that mostly bays and blacks were left on the range. Adoption procedures changed in 1994 so that now the original colors and patterns of the herd are returning. In 1992, a private group, the Pryor Mountains Mustang Breeders Association was formed to preserve the gene pool of the herd and establish a registry for Pryor Mountains horses in private hands. In order to be placed on the register, the horse must have a registered sire and dam, have a title issued either by BLM or the Tillett ranch, and have a certificate of blood typing from the Gluck Equine Research Center at the University of Kentucky. As of 2008, 209 horses in 16 U.S. states and one Canadian province were on the registry. BLM undertook a roundup of the horse herd in 1997 to reduce its numbers, and officials expected to do another in late 2000 when the herd size reached 200. By August 1999, there were 180 adult horses and colts on the range.

=== Policy changes and post-2000 roundups ===
In May 2009, after several long-term studies of the rangeland, the BLM determined that the range's maximum carrying capacity was 179 feral horses. This assumed that all BLM land, as well as lands leased from other owners (public and private), would continue to be available to the animals, and that the BLM would be able to manage the horses by using artificial watering sites to encourage the horses to utilize undergrazed portions of the range. The BLM also said it would implement other range management techniques, and proposed purchasing 1,467 acres (594 ha) of land from the state of Montana, and another 632 acres (256 ha) of private land, to add to the range.

At the same time, BLM said it would reduce the herd from its existing 195 adults to 120. The stated goal was to temporarily remove horses from the refuge to allow the range to recover from the historic overgrazing caused by livestock, not because BLM believed there were too many horses on the range. Sixty percent of the remaining horses would be males, to reduce the rate of population growth. The agency said it would remove 30 horses a year from the herd and stable them at a yearly cost of $18,000 to $21,000 until the correct herd size and sex ratios had been reached. Horses to be removed from the herd included those which did not closely fit the conformity type; which were genetically well represented; which were 11 to 15 years of age, had sired or foaled, and were not band stallions; and were between five and 10 years of age or 16 to 20 years of age. Genetic diversity would be measured by visual observation of the herd's conformity to type using a visual system developed by Dr. Sponenberg, and measures taken to improve genetic diversity if signs of inbreeding occurred. The Cloud Foundation and Front Range Equine Rescue, both feral horse advocacy groups, challenged the roundup in federal court. A federal district court judge delayed the roundup three days to consider their request, but on September 2, 2009, rejected the injunction and allowed the roundup to proceed.

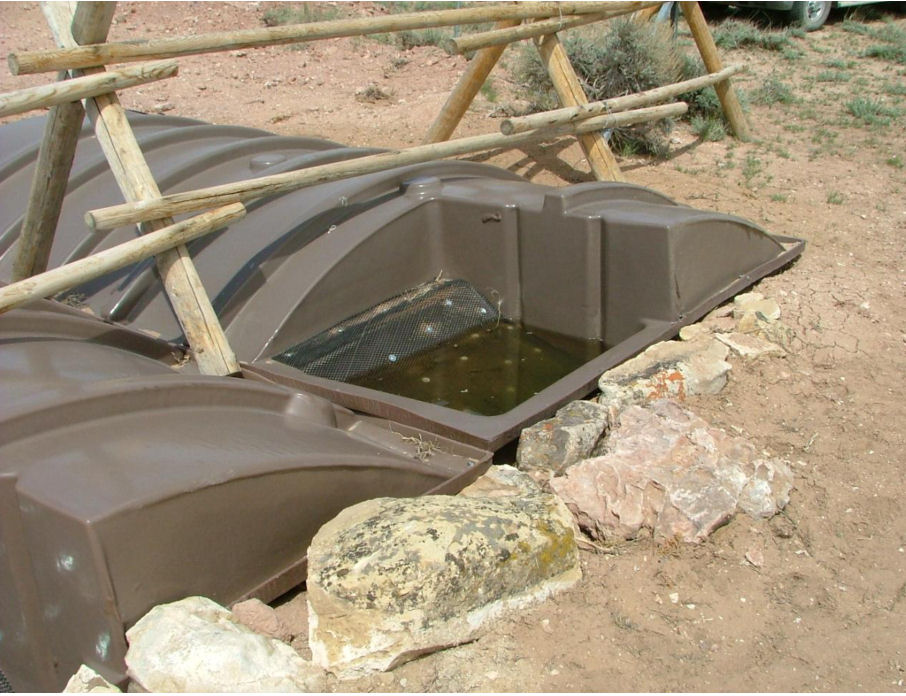
A "guzzler" (precipitation trap and storage tanks designed to provide water to wildlife) on the Pryor Mountains Wild Horse Refuge.

BLM began its roundup of feral horses on the Pryor Mountains range in early September 2009. After several days, 130 of 188 feral horses were rounded up. Forty-six horses were put up for adoption, while the freed mares were given a contraceptive vaccine to help keep the herd population down. Also in 2009, BLM also placed "guzzlers" on the range. A guzzler is a precipitation (usually rainwater) collection device which traps water in a storage tank ranging in size from a few to several thousand gallons. The storage tank can be above-ground, partially buried, or below-ground. A mechanical valve releases water into a drinking trough from the storage tanks, allowing animals access to the water. When the valve senses that the water level in the trough is low, it opens and allows more water into the drinking area. Five guzzlers were placed in undergrazed areas to encourage the horses to better utilize this forage.

In August 2012, another roundup was completed, resulting in a further 45 horses being removed and adopted out to the public through an auction. In this gather, 38 adults and 7 foals were removed, and the public paid an average price of $225 for each horses; the maximum paid was $2,300 for a mare and foal combination. During the roundup, 63 mares were treated with contraceptives, and the post-gather herd population was estimated at 133 horses. The price paid for these horses is higher than that paid for horses from most other Mustang herds; horses removed from unnamed herds in Oregon can be adopted for a walk-up fee of $125. However, it is lower than the price paid for horses from some other popular herds; horses from the Kiger mustang herds sometimes sell for over $7,000 each. As of 2013, the BLM estimated there to be 145 horses in the Pryor Mountain Wild Horse Range (PMWHR), a number above the "Appropriate Management Level", which has continued to be set at 120. The PMWHR is the only Herd Management Area (a BLM area managed for feral horses and/or burros) in Montana. There are six additional Herd Areas (BLM areas that currently have or have had in the past populations of wild horses, but are deemed not suitable for horses) in the state, but none currently contain horses, leaving the Pryor Mountain mustangs the only free-roaming mustangs remaining in Montana.

In the fall of 2010, BLM issued a set of draft strategy documents for operating its wild horse programs, and solicited public comment on the plans. After receiving numerous comments, BLM said in February 2011 it would quicken the pace at which it made revisions to its roundup procedures, use of fertility control drugs, and wild horse and burro range land management. The agency also commissioned a study from the National Academies of Science (NAS) on wild-horse management. In September 2011, BLM announced it would begin working with the Humane Society of the United States to develop new practices in herd management and roundup, and increase its emphasis on adoptions and the use of drugs as fertility control to help better manage its wild horse herds. The results of the study by the NAS were released in June 2013, and covered a wide variety of issues, including the carrying capacity of wild horse and burro ranges, wild horse and burro population growth, and best practices in fertility control. Overall, the NAS was critical of the BLM, saying that herd populations were increasing at an "unsustainable rate" and that the "BLM fails to effectively use contraception tools", criticizing the methods used for estimating populations and available forage, and stating that the agency has failed to communicate appropriately with the public. This report applied to all BLM-managed equine populations, and was not specific to the PMWHR.

== Tourism ==
The Pryor Mountains feral horse herd is one of the most accessible feral horse herds in the United States. Tourism to the range increased steadily in the mid to late 2000s. The range can be easily accessed via a paved road which parallels Bighorn Canyon, and which provides excellent viewing of the horses. The range can also be accessed from Laurel, Montana, by traveling south on U.S. Route 310 and then taking the Forest Service gravel road to Dryhead Overlook. Some of the range may be accessed via the Crow Indian Reservation. A trespass permit from the Crow Nation is required to cross tribal land or exit a vehicle while on tribal land. Hiking on the Pryor Mountains Wild Horse range is good, but there are no maintained or marked trails and (as of 2000) no guidebooks to the area.

== See also ==
- Wild horse preservation

== Sources ==
- Billings Field Office. Environmental Assessment MT-10-08-24 and Herd Management Area Plan. Bureau of Land Management. U.S. Department of the Interior. May 2009.
- Cothran, E. Gus. Genetic Analysis of the Pryor Mountains HMA, MT. Bureau of Land Management. U.S. Department of the Interior. September 2, 2010.
- Cruise, David and Griffiths, Alison. Wild Horse Annie and the Last of the Mustangs: The Life of Velma Johnston. New York: Scribner, 2010.
- Dutson, Judith. Storey's Illustrated Guide to 96 Horse Breeds of North America. North Adams, Mass.: Storey Publishing, 2005.
- Fischer, Carol and Fischer, Hank. Montana Wildlife Viewing Guide. Helena, Mont.: Falcon, 1995.
- Nazzaro, Robin M.; et al. (October 9, 2008) [Publicly released November 10, 2008]. Bureau of Land Management: Effective Long-Term Options Needed to Manage Unadoptable Wild Horses. United States Government Accountability Office (Report). Washington, D.C. GAO-09-77. Archived (PDF) from the original on May 20, 2021.
- Hill, Cherry and Klimesh, Richard. Horse Hoof Care. North Adams, Mass.: Storey Publishing, 2009.
- Lynghaug, Fran. The Official Horse Breeds Standards Guide. Minneapolis: Voyageur Press, 2009.
- Pomeranz, Lynn and Massingham, Rhonda. Among Wild Horses: A Portrait of the Pryor Mountain Mustangs. Storey Publishing, 2006
- Rowles, Genevieve. Adventure Guide to Montana. Edison, N.J.: Hunter Publishing, 2000.
- Ryden, Hope. America's Last Wild Horses. New York, NY: Lyons Press, 1999.
- Singer, Francis J. and Schoenecker, Kathryn A. Manager's Summary—Ecological Studies of the Pryor Mountain Wild Horse Range, 1992–1997. Fort Collins, Colo.: U.S. Dept. of the Interior, U.S. Geological Survey, 1997.
