= Pryor Mountains Wild Horse Range =

Wildlife refuge in Montana and Wyoming, US

- IUCN category IV (habitat/species management area)
- Location within the United States
- Location: Carbon County, Montana, and Big Horn County, Wyoming, United States
- Nearest city: Billings, Montana
- Coordinates: 45°03′12″N 108°19′21″W
- Area: 39,650 acres (160.5 km^{2})
- Established: September 9, 1968
- Governing body: Bureau of Land Management
- Website: Pryor Mountains Wild Horse Range

The Pryor Mountains Wild Horse Range is a refuge for a historically significant herd of free-roaming mustangs, the Pryor Mountain mustang, feral horses colloquially called "wild horses", located in the Pryor Mountains of Montana and Wyoming in the United States. The range has an area of 39,650 acres (160.5 km^{2}) and was established in 1968 along the Montana–Wyoming border as the first protected refuge dedicated exclusively for mustangs. It was the second feral horse refuge in the United States. About a quarter of the refuge lies within the Bighorn Canyon National Recreation Area. A group of federal agencies, led by the Bureau of Land Management, administers the range.

Because of the unique genetic makeup of the Pryor Mountain mustang herd, equine geneticist Dr. E. Gus Cothran concluded in 1992 that "the Pryor herd may be the most significant wild-horse herd remaining in the United States." Dr. D. Phillip Sponenberg, equine veterinarian at Virginia-Maryland Regional College of Veterinary Medicine, agreed, noting, "[These animals] don't exist anywhere else."

== Establishing the range ==
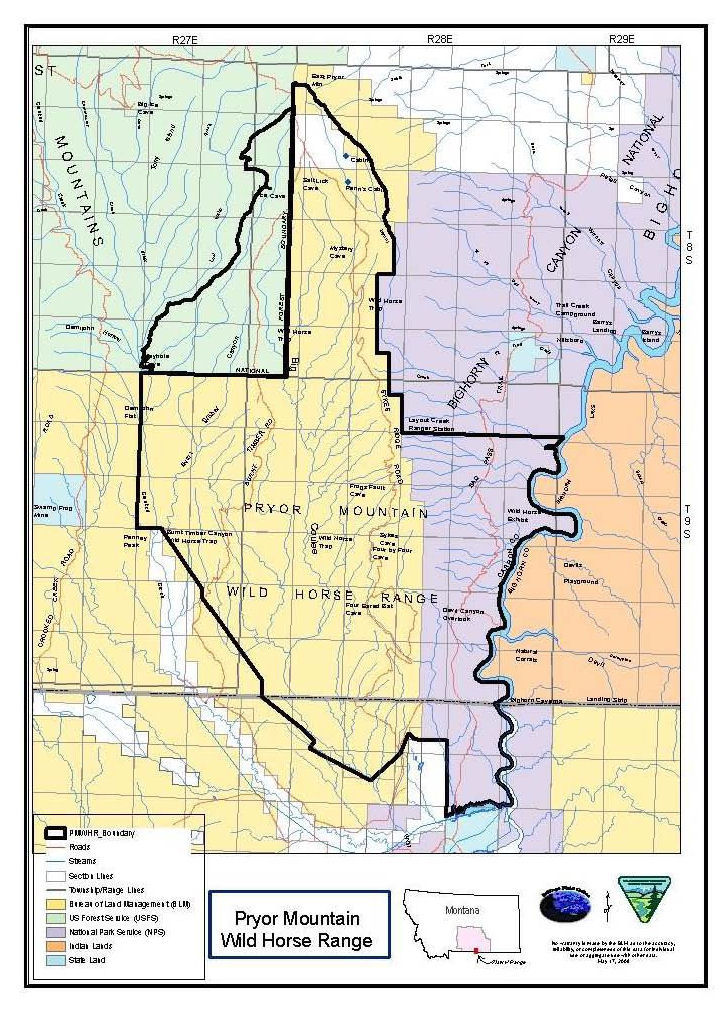
Bureau of Land Management map of the Pryor Mountains Wild Horse Range, showing BLM, Crow Nation, Forest Service, National Park Service, private, and state lands

In 1900, there were two to five million feral horses in the United States. However, their numbers were in steep decline as domestic cattle and sheep competed with them for resources. After the mid-1930s, their numbers fell even more drastically due to intervention by the U.S. government. The United States Forest Service and the U.S. Grazing Service (the predecessor to the Bureau of Land Management (BLM)) began to remove feral horses from federal land. The two agencies were concerned that there were too many horses on the land, which led to overgrazing and significant soil erosion. Ranchers wanted the feral horses removed because they were grazing on land ranchers wanted to use for their own livestock. Hunters were worried that as horses degraded range land, hunting species would also suffer.

It was not clear that there were too many horses, or that the land was incurring damage due to the presence of the horses. Nonetheless, both agencies responded to political pressure to act, and they began to remove hundreds of thousands of feral horses from federal property. From 1934 to 1963, the Grazing Service (and from 1946 onward, the BLM) paid private contractors to kill mustangs and permitted their carcasses to be used for pet food. Ranchers were often permitted to round up any horses they wanted, and the Forest Service shot any remaining animals.

Feral horse advocates were unhappy with the Forest Service and BLM's horse-culling procedures. They argued that herding horses from the air or by motorized vehicle (such as motorcycles) terrorized the animals and caused numerous and cruel injuries. Led by Velma Bronn Johnston—better known as "Wild Horse Annie", a secretary at an insurance firm in Reno, Nevada—animal welfare and horse advocates lobbied for passage of a federal law to prevent this kind of hunting. Their efforts were successful. On September 8, 1959, President Dwight D. Eisenhower signed into law the Hunting Wild Horses and Burros on Public Lands Act (Public Law 86- 234, also known as the "Wild Horse Annie Act"), which banned the hunting of feral horses on federal land from aircraft or motorized vehicles.

However, in 1961 President John F. Kennedy ordered the United States Department of the Interior to implement measures to stop soil erosion on federal land. On the Pryor Mountains range, where there were about 140 to 200 horses, BLM ordered in 1964 that the horses be removed. Fearful that the horses were not going to be stabled but that the roundup was a prelude to slaughter of the entire herd, in 1966 Johnston began a letter-writing and public relations campaign against the BLM. Johnston's goal was the establishment of a permanent refuge for the Pryor Mountains herd, but this was a daunting task. Hunting and ranching lobby groups had strongly opposed establishment of a feral horse refuge in Nevada, and accepted creation of the Nevada Wild Horse Range in 1962 only because it was within the Nellis Air Force Range area of 2,200,000 acres (8,900 km^{2}) (renamed Nevada Test and Training Range in 2001).

In 1965, Johnston founded the International Society for the Protection of Mustangs and Burros (ISPMB), a nonprofit group dedicated to educating the public about the plight of feral horses and burros, and lobbied Congress and the executive branch for their protection on public land. Johnston and her group had several local allies as well. They included Bessie Tillett (a widowed rancher's wife in her 80s) and her sons, Royce and Lloyd Tillett. The Tilletts tried to protect the feral horses beginning in 1964, claiming them as their own and threatening BLM officials who tried to remove the herd from land which the Tilletts leased from BLM. (The Tilletts also kept feral horses from the herd on their private land, and began adopting them out.) BLM officials suspended the Tilletts' lease in 1966 (the reason was inadequate fencing), forcing the family to give up their claim to many horses. Others who wanted to protect the herd included ranchers and the people of nearby Lovell, Wyoming, who not only considered the horses as part of Western heritage but also as a major tourist attraction. The ISPMB and its allies proved highly effective in raising public awareness of the issue and building political support for their efforts, and in 1966 BLM suspended its plans for the roundup.

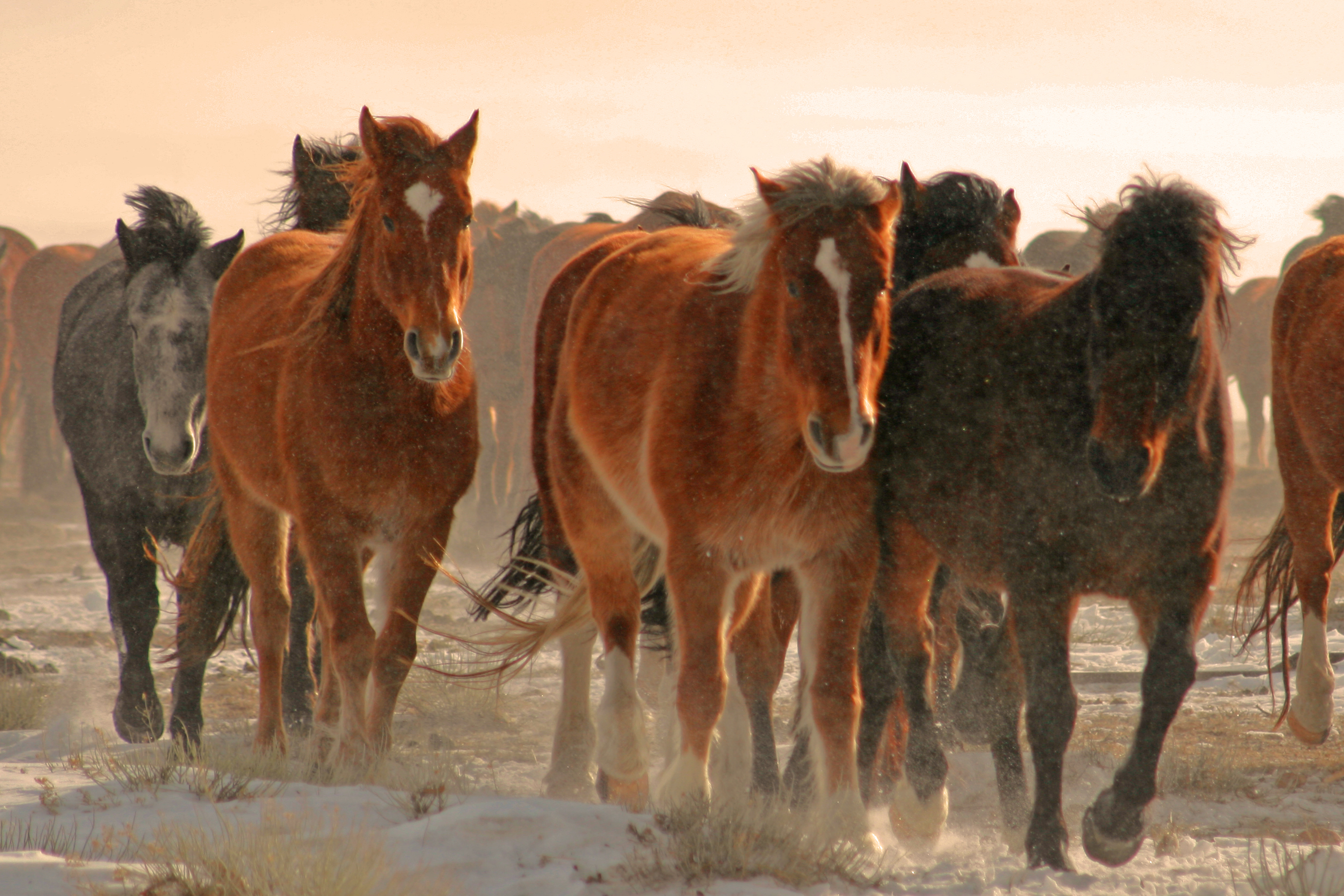
Some wild mustangs have found a new home, such as these horses at an ecosanctuary.

In 1968, BLM proposed three new plans for dealing with the Pryor Mountain mustang herd: removing but not killing all but 30 to 35 animals and allowing the rest to remain on the range; killing all but 10 to 15 animals and allowing the herd to recover to 30 animals; or allowing the state of Montana to remove all the animals and sell them. In response, Pryor Mountains horse advocates began pushing for a protected sanctuary for these animals. The group contacted ABC News producer Hope Ryden and made her aware of BLM's plans. Ryden visited the range and filmed a news segment which aired on July 11, 1968, on ABC News with Frank Reynolds. ABC News and BLM were "deluged" with mail protesting the removal of the horses after the segment aired. On August 27, 1968, the Humane Society of the United States successfully sued to stop trapping of the horses. The political landscape shifted dramatically toward protection rather than removal of the horses. On September 9, 1968, Secretary of the Interior Stewart Udall formally established a Pryor Mountains Wild Horse Range of 33,600 acres (136 km^{2}). Montana's senior senator, Mike Mansfield, was so elated that he published Udall's order scrapping the BLM plan in the Congressional Record.

The size of the range was determined by law, which specified that the range could cover only those areas where feral horses existed in 1971 (but not necessarily historically). A boundary fence had been constructed between BLM and Forest Service land in the 1940s, which significantly affected feral horse distribution in the Pryor Mountains and restricted the horses to rangeland south, east, and west of the Custer National Forest. By 1968, when the refuge was created, fences completely surrounded what became the refuge, limiting the horses' spread. Both BLM and the Forest Service interpreted the Wild and Free-Roaming Horses and Burros Act of 1971 as requiring protection of feral horses only on those lands where the horses existed as of 1971, not lands which they had historically used.

== Changing legal status of the range ==
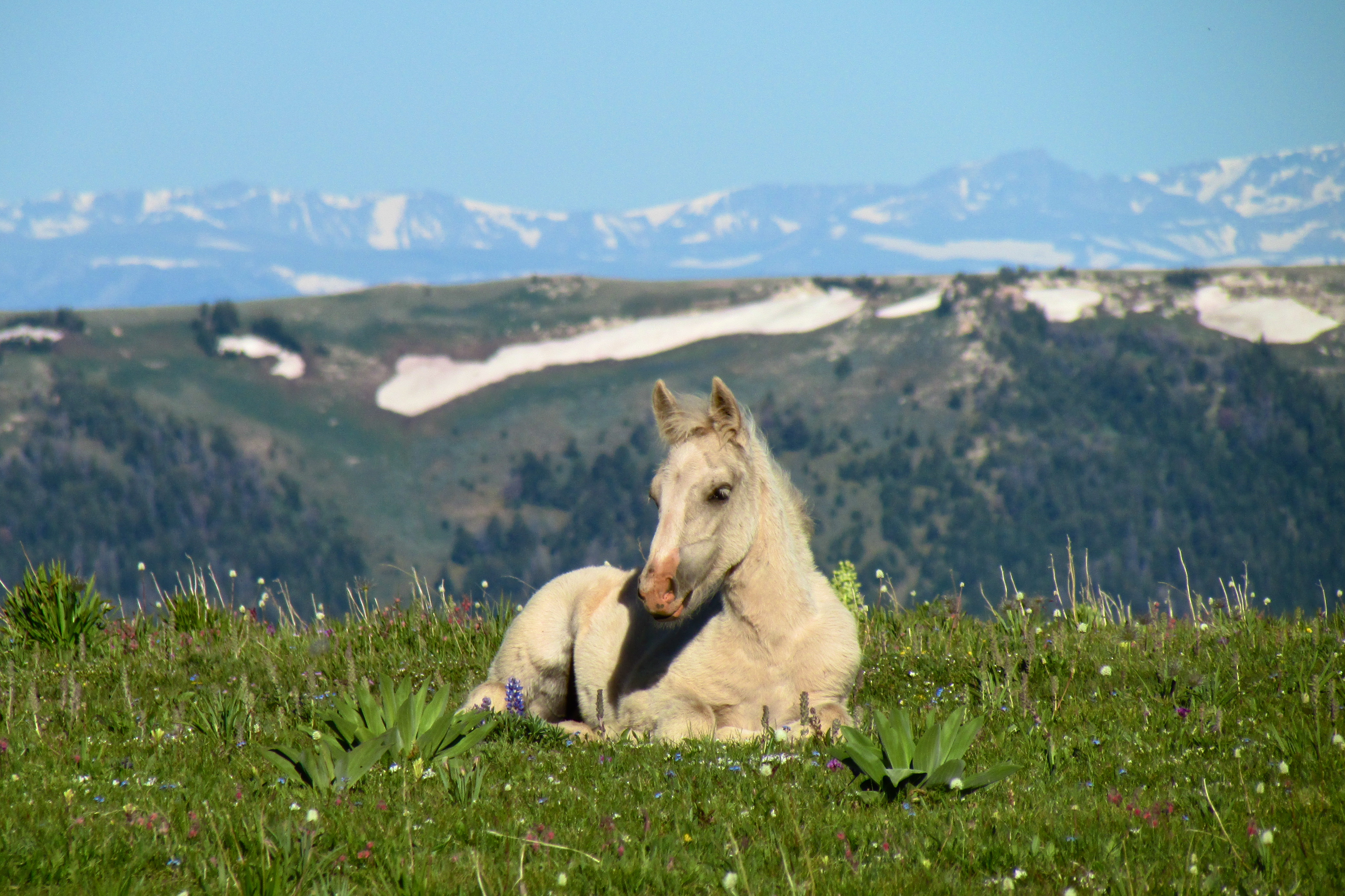
Horse resting on the range

Establishment of the Pryor Mountains Wild Horse Range did not end debate over the legal status of the horse herd, how they should be protected, or how many horses should be permitted to live on the range.

In October 1968, the Interior department established an Advisory Committee to report on the state of the herd, the status of forage on the range, and whether feral horses should continue to be kept on the range. The panel met a month later, and commissioned studies on whether branded runaway horses should be allowed to mix with the herd, whether BLM should build artificial watering holes to encourage the animals to range more widely, whether BLM should manage the herd's bloodlines by introducing stallions to the herds, and how many horses should live on the range. At its February 1969 meeting, the committee proved sharply divided over horse management issues. Studies of the range proved highly inadequate. BLM presented a study to the committee which attempted to show that horses were grazing the land so heavily that extensive erosion was taking place, but a private study found that the erosion was due to topography and drought and not because of the horses. Another study, conducted by a group which promoted hunting on the range, found that the horses were having a negative impact on edible plants in the Pryor Mountains and were having a detrimental impact on deer fawn survival. But the committee discovered that this study had not been conducted in the Pryor Mountains but at another location. Another BLM study concluded that the Pryor Mountains horses had changed from grazers to browsers and were consuming large mountain mahogany shrub, a critical deer food source. But an Advisory Committee analysis showed that the plants documented in the study were small mountain mahogany shrub variety, not the large mahogany shrub as claimed by BLM, and that the vegetation was in good shape, not deteriorated as the BLM claimed.

In June 1969, the Committee rendered its unanimous opinion that forage on the range was in good shape, herd health was good, and that the range should be managed solely for the protection of wild horses. The Advisory Committee did, however, recommend that the herd levels be reduced to no more than 100 horses; that branded, deformed, old, and sick animals be culled from the herd; that BLM should create new watering holes to encourage the herd to forage more widely; that the range be fenced; and that roads be constructed in the range's interior to improve access for tourists. In 1970, BLM built a 20,000-US-gallon (76,000 L) catch-basin to help supply horses on the range with water.

=== Wild and Free-Roaming Horses and Burros Act of 1971 ===
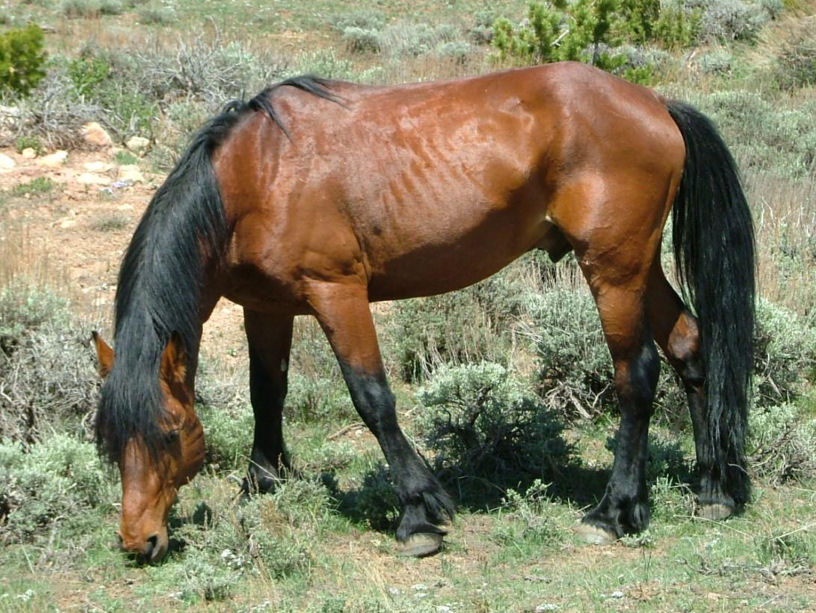
A feral horse grazes on the Pryor Mountains refuge.

Also at issue were BLM practices for managing horses in protected areas. Under BLM policy, ranchers could release a branded mare into a herd and then, the following year, round up the band the mare ran with for slaughter or sale. In Nevada, state law permitted ranchers to round up any unbranded horses on their private land and slaughter or sell them. Concerned about these practices, and about continuing horse hunts in unprotected areas, Johnston and her group began working to pass federal legislation to protect feral horses throughout the U.S. She was joined by a number of prominent people, including country music singer Judy Lynn, Gunsmoke actress Amanda Blake, and Manchester Union Leader publisher and conservative William Loeb III.

On December 18, 1971, President Richard M. Nixon signed into law the Wild and Free-Roaming Horses and Burros Act of 1971 (WFRHBA), which made it a crime for anyone to harass or kill feral horses or burros on federal land, required the departments of the Interior and Agriculture to protect the animals, required studies of the animals' habits and habitats, and permitted public land to be set aside for their use. In addition, the act required that feral horses be protected as "living symbols of the historic and pioneer spirit of the West", and that management plans must "maintain a thriving natural ecological balance among wild horse populations, wildlife, livestock, and vegetation and to protect the range from the deterioration associated with overpopulation." Although feral horse ranges were principally for the protection of the horses, the land was required to be maintained for multiple use. BLM was also permitted to close public land to livestock grazing to protect feral horse and burro habitat.

The WFRHBA gave jurisdiction over challenges to BLM and Forest Service management of feral horses and how the act is implemented to the Department of the Interior's Board of Land Appeals. The act also contained provisions for the removal of excess animals; the destruction of lame, old, or sick animals; the private placement or adoption of excess animals; and even the destruction of healthy animals if range management required it.

The destruction of healthy or unhealthy horses almost never occurred. The WFRHBA left range management policy unresolved in many respects, although it did specify that BLM and the Forest Service consult with state wildlife agencies. In practice, BLM struggled to accommodate the needs of feral horses among its other priorities (which included livestock grazing, prevention of soil erosion, and accommodating big game hunting). In November 1971, BLM announced a major effort to save the Pryor Mountains herd from starvation after a poor summer growing season left vegetation stunted on the range. By 1974, the herd on the Pryor Mountains range had increased by 17 percent over the 1968 level. However, there was strong disagreement over whether the population had increased as much as this, if at all.

=== Adopt-a-Horse program ===
In 1973, BLM began a pilot project on the Pryor Mountains Wild Horse Range known as the Adopt-A-Horse initiative. The program took advantage of provisions in the WFRHBA to allow private "qualified" individuals to "adopt" as many horses as they wanted if they could show that they could provide adequate care for the animals. At the time, title to the horses remained permanently with the U.S. federal government. The pilot project was so successful that BLM allowed it to go nationwide in 1976. (As of 2001, the Adopt-a-Horse program was the primary method of removing excess feral horses from BLM and Forest Service land.) In 1976, Congress included a provision in the Federal Land Policy and Management Act that permitted the humane use of helicopters in capturing free-roaming horses on federal land, and for the use of motorized vehicles in transporting them to corrals. In 2009, a BLM official said that while many federally protected feral horse ranges have trouble gaining adoption for their horses, every horse from the Pryor Mountains herd put up for adoption was subsequently adopted by a private citizen.

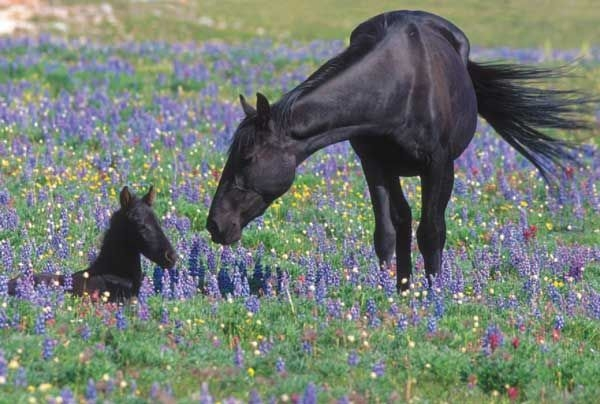
A mare attends to her foal on the Pryor Mountains Wild Horse Refuge.

There were, however, strong disagreements over the nature of the horses. Many ranchers and hunters considered feral horses to be an invasive species, or at least an introduced species. While conceding that federal law protects the animals, these individuals also argued that economic needs (like livestock grazing) should take precedence over the horses. However, horse advocates argued that horses were native to North America and eliminated by paleolithic human beings, and as a native wild animal, they should be protected as are the grizzly bear or bald eagle. To test which definition applied to feral horses, in 1974 the New Mexico Livestock Board seized 19 free-roaming feral burros that were preventing cattle from using a watering hole on federal land. The United States District Court for the District of New Mexico held that, under the Property Clause of the U.S. Constitution, Congress could regulate wild animals only to protect public land from damage.

The case went to the Supreme Court of the United States. In Kleppe v. New Mexico, 426 U.S. 529 (1976), the Supreme Court ruled that these free-roaming horses and burros were, in fact, wildlife, and it rejected New Mexico's narrow construction of the Property Clause. Ranchers continued to litigate the issue, however. In the early 1980s, ranching interests won a ruling from the Department of the Interior that feral horses who ate grass or drank water on lands which ranchers had leased had "taken" these resources from the ranchers in violation of the "takings clause" of the Fifth Amendment to the U.S. Constitution. However, in Mountain States Legal Foundation v. Hodel, 799 F.2d 1423 (1986), cert. den'd. 480 U.S. 951 (1987), the United States Court of Appeals for the Tenth Circuit said that a wild animal was not an "agent" of the federal government and hence could not be found guilty of "taking" the ranchers' leased grass or water.

Problems with the Adopt-a-Horse program also emerged. BLM was accused of allowing too many adoptions so as to deplete feral horse populations on federal land. Many private individuals were also accused of "adopting" horses only to sell them later for slaughter as pet food. Responding to these problems, in 1978 Congress passed the Public Rangelands Improvement Act (PRIA). The PRIA limited adoptions to four horses a year per individual and allowed BLM to relinquish title to the horse after one year (during which inspections regarding the animal's treatment were to occur). The law also required BLM to inventory all feral horse herds, scientifically determine what constituted "appropriate" herd levels, and determine through a public process whether "excess" animals should be removed. Congress further amended PRIA in 1978 to require updated herd counts. Pursuant to the 1978 amendments, BLM established 209 "herd management areas" (HMAs) where feral horses existed on federal land. The Pryor Mountains Wild Horse Range was one of only three HMAs solely dedicated to feral horses. In January 1982, the director of BLM issued a moratorium on the destruction of excess adoptable animals. From 1988 to 2004, Congress also prohibited BLM from using any funds to destroy excess animals.

Most of the Pryor Mountains Wild Horse Range was designated a wilderness study area in 1981. Wilderness study areas (WSAs) are authorized by the Federal Land Policy and Management Act of 1976. The act directed the Bureau of Land Management (BLM) of the United States Department of the Interior to inventory and study all federally owned roadless areas for possible designation as a Wilderness Area. Until the United States Congress makes a final determination on the status of a wilderness study area, the BLM must manage the area as a protected national wilderness. Three BLM areas entirely enclosed by the range and one National Park Service area only partially within the range were recommended for wilderness in August 1991 and December 1981. These areas are the Burnt Timber Canyon WSA, Pryor Mountain WSA, Big Horn Tack-On WSA, and Bighorn Canyon National Recreation Area WSA.

=== Further legal changes ===
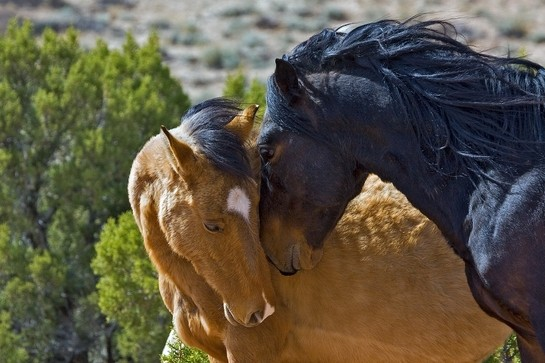
Male and female wild mustangs at the Pryor Mountain Wild Horse Range

In November 1996, Congress passed the Omnibus Parks and Public Lands Management Act, which authorized BLM and the Forest Service to use helicopters and motor vehicles to round up and transport feral horses on public lands.

In 2004, Republican Senator from Montana Conrad Burns inserted a rider into the Consolidated Appropriations Act of 2005 (a 3,000-page omnibus appropriations bill) which permitted BLM to sell excess animals more than 10 years old or which have been offered for adoption three times. The amendment also required that excess, unadoptable horses "shall be made available for sale without limitation." Burns was reportedly acting on behalf of ranching interests, who wanted more of the horses to be removed from federal land. Although the legislation (signed into law by President George W. Bush) was described by one media outlet as "undercut[ing] more than three decades of lobbying and legislative action aimed at protecting America's wild horses from slaughter", as of May 2011 it has not been repealed.

In early 2005, BLM discovered that some of the excess wild horses it had sold had been slaughtered. BLM suspended the sales program in April 2005 and resumed it in May 2005 after implementing new requirements to deter buyers from slaughtering the animals. In the fall of 2007, the last three horse slaughterhouses in the United States closed. However, BLM procedures do not ban the export of wild horses for sale and slaughter outside the United States.

In 2008, the Government Accountability Office concluded BLM was not in compliance with the 2004 amendment. BLM had imposed limitations on the sale of excess horses to help ensure that they were not slaughtered (thus avoiding a public outcry).

== About the range ==
=== Geographic and ecological description ===
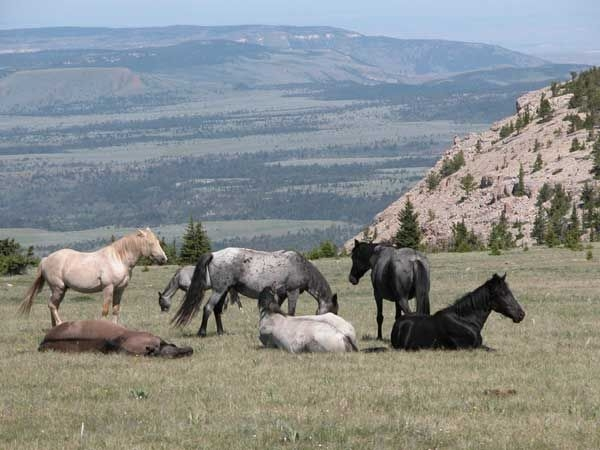
Horses roaming freely on the range

The Pryor Mountains are a 145,000-square-mile (380,000 km^{2}) region of Montana and Wyoming. They were formed in the late Cretaceous and Early Tertiary period (about 70 to 60 million years ago) when magma welling up from below cracked a vast limestone plateau into four pieces and uplifted the northeast corner of each piece. The Bighorn River flows north from Wyoming until it reaches the plateau between the Bighorn and Pryor mountains. The river flows along the fault line between the two mountain ranges, and has cut the Bighorn Canyon deep into the limestone. The Crow Native American tribe called the mountains Baahpuuo Isawaxaawuua ("Hitting the Rock Mountains"), because of the large amount of flint found there (a type of rock which could be chipped into arrowheads and spear points). The mountains were named after Sergeant Nathaniel Hale Pryor, a member of the Lewis and Clark Expedition, who vainly pursued horses stolen from the expedition in the area.

Soil and water resources on the range are limited. Soil depth varies from less than 10 inches (25 cm) deep to 40 inches (100 cm) deep, and there are only five perennial water sources on the range. Livestock grazing occurred on the range until the late 1960s, and the area historically was severely overgrazed. This created the limited forage conditions found on the range today.

The Pryor Mountains Wild Horse Range is east of and adjacent to Bighorn Canyon National Recreation Area. The range consists primarily of alpine meadows, high desert, rocky ridges, and steep, semi-alpine slopes. The average elevation is about 8,700 feet (2,700 m). Rainfall varies from as little as 5 inches (130 mm) in the foothills to 20 inches (510 mm) in the mountains' upper reaches. Snowfall is generally about 3 feet (0.91 m) a year, and occurs from September to May.

=== About the herd ===
Historians and scientists speculate that feral horses have lived on and near Pryor Mountains since at least the late 1600s. Crow Indian tradition maintains that the horses were brought to the area by about 1725. Non-Indian explorers found native people owning large numbers of horses as early as 1743. Thousands of feral horses lived in the area by the time American pioneers began settling near the Pryor Mountains in the late 1800s.

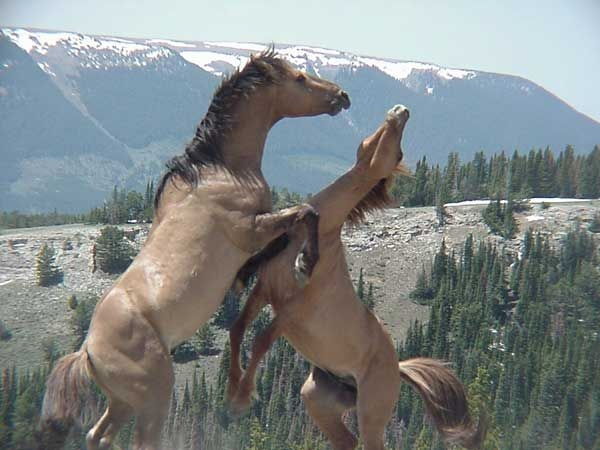
Stallions fight for control of a band, or "harem", of mares on the Pryor Mountains Wild Horse Range. A single stallion can control a band of about six to eight mares.

It was widely believed that the Pryor Mountains horses were direct descendants of the Barb horses brought to North America by Juan de Oñate's expedition in the early 1600s to explore America north of the Rio Grande. Their bloodlines may also include American Saddlebred, Canadian, Irish Hobby, and Tennessee Walking horses, although this was in dispute for many years. Some people claimed that the horses were nothing more than local domestic horses that had escaped to the wild. In 1992, equine geneticist Dr. E. Gus Cothran ran genetic studies on the herd, and concluded that their primary bloodline descends from Spanish Barbs.

Since no genetic variants were observed that were not also seen in domestic horse breeds, in 2010 Cothran concluded the horses were not a unique species that had survived from prehistoric times. Rather, they were linear descendants of the Spanish Barb, with some evidence of genetic similarity to light racing and riding breeds. The genetic tests also revealed that the Pryor Mountains horses carried a rare allele variant known as "Qac" that only Spanish horses brought to the Americas also carried. Dr. D. Phillip Sponenberg of the Virginia–Maryland Regional College of Veterinary Medicine, and an expert on horse breeds, observed that, physically, the horses conform to the Colonial Spanish Horse type. Genetic studies have also revealed that the herd exhibits a high degree of genetic diversity. BLM has acknowledged the genetic uniqueness of the herd.

The Pryor Mountains feral horse conforms to a very specific type. The animal is generally 13 to 15 hands (52 to 60 inches, 132 to 152 cm) high, with an average of 14 to 14.2 hands (56 to 58 inches, 142 to 147 cm). The horses weigh 700 to 800 pounds (320 to 360 kg) on the range, and more if raised in captivity. The animals exhibit a wide range of solid colors, including bay, black, chestnut, dun, grullo, and blue or red roan. Buckskin coloring is rare but does occur, and pinto coloring can be minimally expressed. However, the majority of colors are dun or grullo. Nearly all the horses on the range exhibit primitive markings, such as dorsal stripes, transverse stripes across the withers, and horizontal "zebra" stripes on the back of the forelegs. The Pryor Mountains horse's body is heavy, with strong bones. Manes and tails tend to be long, and the horse's winter coat is very heavy and often curly. The head is convex or straight (the "Roman nose" identified by horse breeders), with wide-set eyes, hooked ears, and a broad forehead that tapers well to the muzzle. The front teeth meet evenly, the upper lip is usually longer than the lower, and the nostrils are small and crescent shaped. The neck is medium in length, and most of the animals have only five lumbar vertebrae (an anatomical feature common in primitive horses)—although some have a fifth and sixth vertebrae that are fused. The horse's shoulders are long and sloping, the withers are prominent, and chests are medium to narrow in width. The croup is generally sloped, and tail-set is low. The hooves are ample and very hard.

Pryor Mountain mustangs exhibit a natural paso gait. The horses are generally intelligent, strong, and sure-footed, and exhibit great stamina. Like all feral horses, they generally avoid human contact, are distrustful, and are easily spooked. However, once they are familiar with an individual, they can exhibit a strong social bond with that individual. Pryor Mountains horses can be trained and ridden, and trained to do any task a domesticated horse can perform. Trained Pryor Mountains horses have a calm temperament, and are alert on trails.

The horses form bands or "harems", in which a single stallion mates with and controls a group of about six mares. Another eight to 10 "bachelor" stallions accompany the band at a distance, hoping to win control of it from the stallion or to mate with mares.

=== Herd management ===
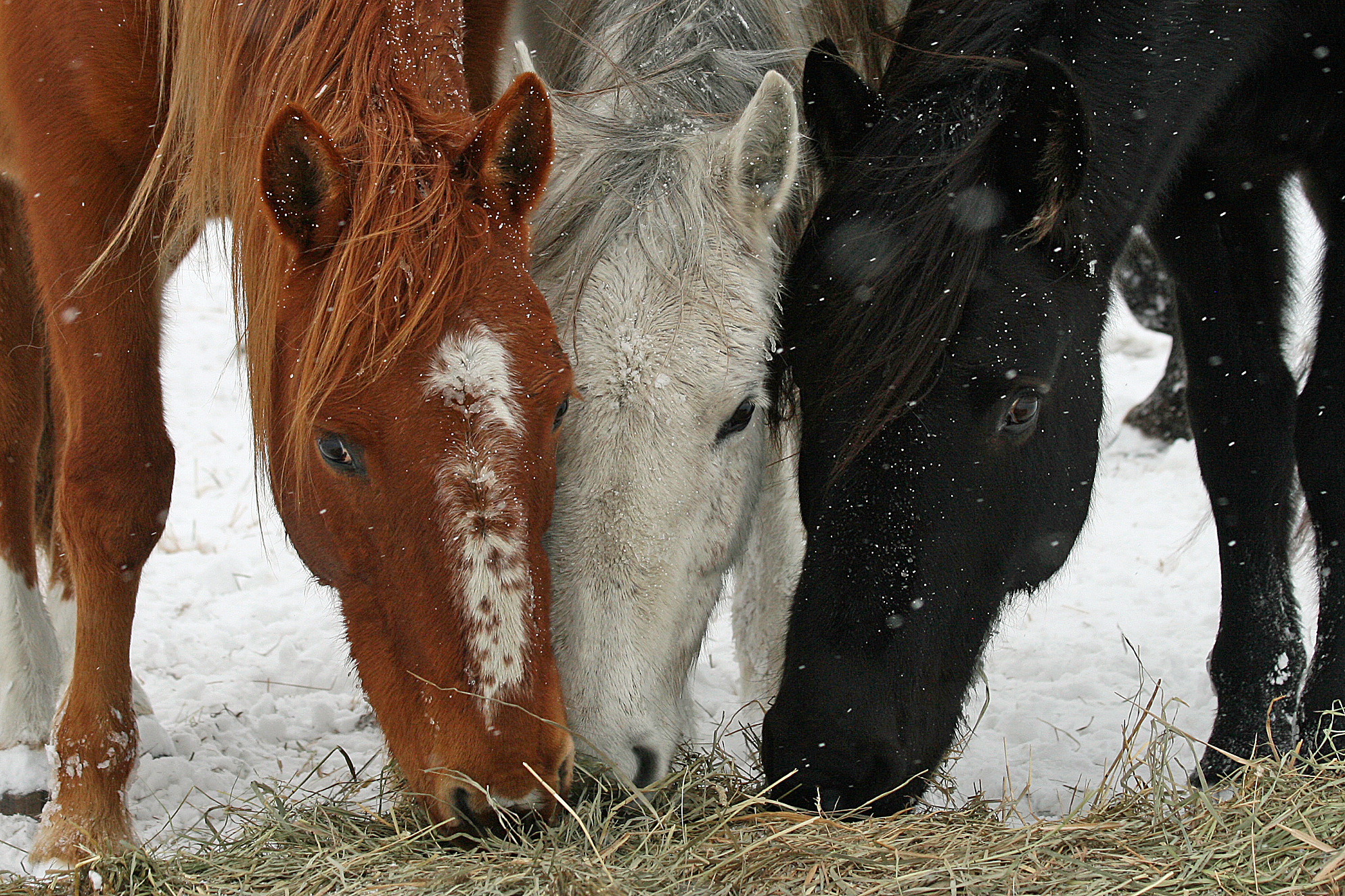
Wild horses at an ecosanctuary in Wyoming

BLM counts the herd visually about every four years by flying over the range, reporting on each animal found, and using statistical methods to correct for historic undercounting and other problems. In 1984, BLM set the maximum carrying capacity of the Pryor Mountains Wild Horse Range at 121 adult animals, and revised this to 95 adult animals in 1992.

Management of the Pryor Mountains horse herd has focused on fulfilling the Free-Roaming Wild Horse and Burro Act's requirement that BLM maintain a "thriving natural ecological balance". In general, BLM initially focused on how many horses the range could support and in maintaining conformity to the Pryor Mountains standard. However, with the development of DNA testing in the mid-1980s, the focus changed to maintaining the herd's genetic viability as well. In 1988, researchers at Washington State University published a paper that raised concern that the herd exhibited a lack of genetic diversity, and could be suffering from genetic drift and/or a population bottleneck. BLM contracted with veterinarian E. Gus Cothran (then at the College of Veterinary Medicine at the University of Kentucky, but now at the Texas A&M College of Veterinary Medicine & Biomedical Sciences) to take random genetic samples of the herd in 1994, 1997, and 2001. Cothran's analysis found "no evidence of a bottleneck". Genetic diversity was above the mean for feral horse herds in the United States, and just below the mean for domesticated breeds. The BLM, however, interpreted these studies in 2009 to indicate that the genetic diversity of the Pryor Mountains herd is "well above" the mean for domestic breeds. Cothran considered the herd to be in genetic equilibrium, although he cautioned that a minimum of 120 breeding-age animals should be kept on the range to maintain the genetic health of the herd. Research by biologists and veterinarians at Colorado State University, the University of Kentucky, and other colleges found that there is little inbreeding in bands, as the stallions tend to drive off colts when they are about two years old.

In 1990, the Government Accountability Office (GAO) issued a report highly critical of BLM's wild horse management programs. The GAO concluded that the BLM had little scientific basis for deciding what the range-carrying capacity was or how many horses should be removed to attain ecological equilibrium or restoration. Furthermore, the GAO found that the BLM had not reduced livestock grazing or engaged in range management activities to improve the carrying capacity of the land.

For years, BLM had also allowed any horse to be adopted from the range. Since adopters favored "pretty" horses, the genetics of the herd altered so that mostly bays and blacks were left on the range. This problem was quickly discovered. Adoption procedures changed in 1994 so that now the original colors and patterns of the herd are returning. That same year, the Pryor Mountains Mustang Breeders Association was formed to preserve the gene pool of the herd and establish a registry for Pryor Mountains horses in private hands. In order to be placed on the register, the horse must have a registered sire and dam, have a title issued either by BLM or the Tillett ranch, and have a certificate of blood typing from the Gluck Equine Research Center at the University of Kentucky. As of 2008, 209 horses in 16 U.S. states and one Canadian province were on the registry.

BLM undertook a roundup of the horse herd in 1997 to reduce its numbers, and BLM officials said that they expected to do another in late 2000 when the herd size reached 200. By August 1999, there were 180 adult horses and colts on the range.

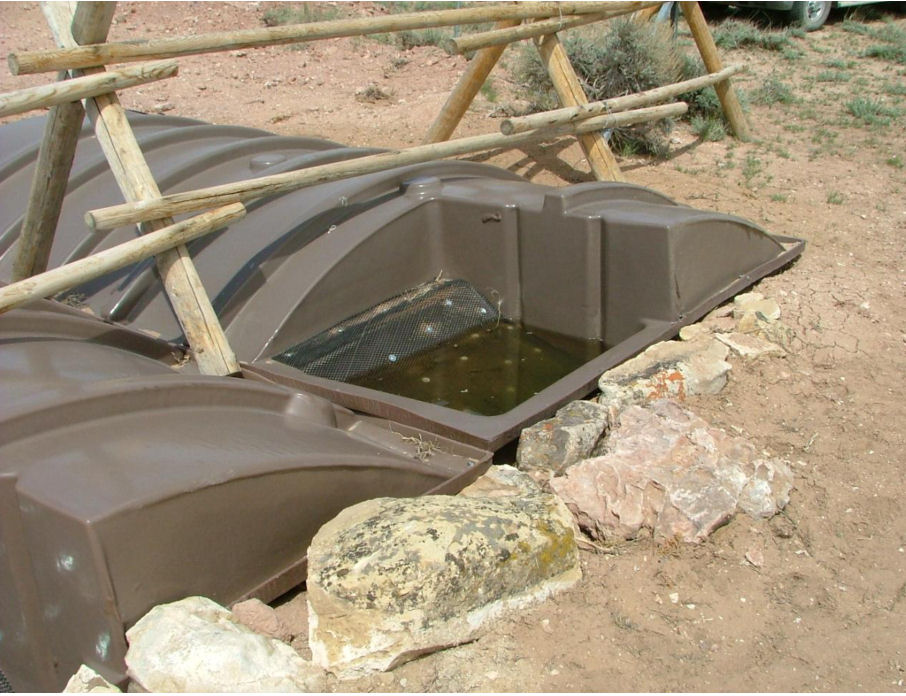
A "guzzler" (precipitation trap and storage tanks designed to provide water to wildlife) on the Pryor Mountains Wild Horse Refuge

In May 2009, after several long-term studies of the rangeland, BLM determined that the range's maximum carrying capacity was 179 feral horses. This assumed that all BLM land, as well as lands leased from other owners (public and private), would continue to be available to the animals, and that BLM would be able to manage the horses by using artificial watering sites to encourage the horses to use undergrazed portions of the range. BLM also said it would implement other range management techniques, including restoration of riparian vegetation to enhance existing watering holes, use of controlled burns to reduce the amount of dead wood and brush on the range, noxious weed control, better fencing, and other methods. BLM also proposed purchasing 1,467 acres (5.9 km^{2}) of land from the state of Montana, and another 632 acres (2.6 km^{2}) of private land, to add to the range.

At the same time, BLM said it would reduce the herd from its existing 195 adults to 120. The goal was to temporarily remove feral horses from the refuge to allow the range to recover from the historic overgrazing caused by livestock, not because BLM believed there were too many horses on the range. According to Jared Bybee, BLM wild horse and burro specialist, grass cover on the range was at 18 percent of its historic average. Sixty percent of the remaining horses would be males, to reduce the rate of population growth. The agency said it would remove 30 horses a year from the herd and stable them at a yearly cost of $18,000 to $21,000 until the correct herd size and sex ratios had been reached. Horses to be removed from the herd included those that did not closely fit the conformity type; that were genetically well represented; that were 11 to 15 years of age, had sired or foaled, and were not band stallions; and were between five and 10 years of age or 16 to 20 years of age. Genetic diversity would be measured by visual observation of the herd's conformity to type (using a visual system developed by Dr. Sponenberg), and measures taken to improve genetic diversity if signs of inbreeding occurred. The Cloud Foundation and Front Range Equine Rescue, both feral horse advocacy groups, challenged the roundup in federal court. A federal district court judge delayed the roundup three days to consider their request, but on September 2, 2009, rejected the injunction and allowed the roundup to proceed.

BLM began its roundup of feral horses on the Pryor Mountains range in early September 2009. After several days, 130 of 188 feral horses were rounded up. Forty-six horses were put up for adoption, while the freed mares were given a contraceptive vaccine to help keep the herd population down. The Forest Service also closed a portion of the Custer National Forest to livestock grazing after about 40 feral horses moved into the area, but rounded these up as well and returned them to the range.

At this time, BLM also placed "guzzlers" on the range. A guzzler is a precipitation (usually rainwater) collection device that traps water in a storage tank (ranging in size from a few to several thousand gallons/liters). The storage tank can be above-ground, partially buried, or below-ground. A mechanical valve releases water into a drinking trough from the storage tanks, allowing animals access to the water. When the valve senses that the water level in the trough is low, it opens and allows more water into the drinking area. Five guzzlers were placed in undergrazed areas to encourage the horses to better use this forage.

In the fall of 2010, BLM issued a set of draft strategy documents for operating its wild horse programs, and solicited public comment on the plans. After receiving numerous comments, BLM said in February 2011 it would quicken the pace at which it revised its roundup procedures, use of fertility control drugs, and wild horse and burro range land management. The agency also commissioned a study from the National Academies of Science (NAS) on wild-horse management. Due for release in 2013, independent NAS experts will study a wide variety of issues, including the carrying capacity of wild horse and burro ranges, wild horse and burro population growth, and best practices in fertility control.

In September 2011, BLM announced it would begin working with the Humane Society of the United States to develop new practices in herd management and roundup, and increase its emphasis on adoptions and the use of drugs as fertility control to help better manage its wild horse herds.

=== Sightseeing on the range ===
The Pryor Mountains feral horse herd is one of the most accessible feral horse herds in the United States. Tourism to the range increased steadily in the mid to late 2000s.

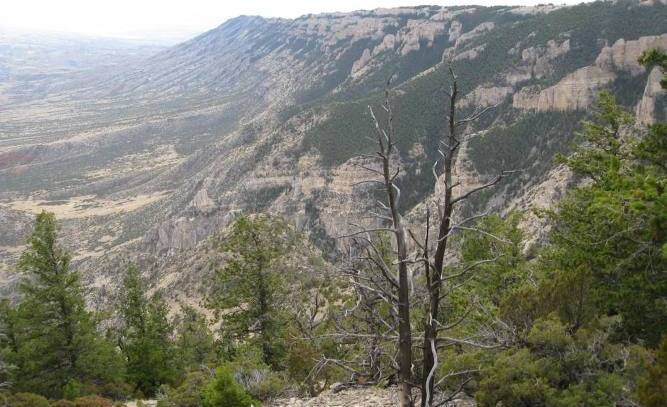
Panoramic image of the Pryor Mountains in Montana

The range can be easily accessed via a paved road which parallels Bighorn Canyon, and which provides excellent viewing of the horses. The range can also be accessed from Laurel, Montana, by traveling south on U.S. Route 310 and taking the Forest Service gravel road to Dryhead Overlook. Those with four-wheel drive vehicles can take the rutted dirt road through the forest to Penn's Cabin, which is another good horse viewing spot.

Those interested in circumnavigating the range can take the dirt Burnt Timber Ridge Road from Penn's Cabin to the dirt Sykes Ridge Road, and follow Sykes Ridge Road to its terminus. (Sykes Ridge Road also offers the best viewing of the Bighorn Basin.) Roads around the range tend to be impassable in wet weather or snow. Some of the range may be accessed via the Crow Indian Reservation. A trespass permit (obtainable from the Crow Nation) is required to cross tribal land or exit a vehicle while on tribal land.

Hiking on the Pryor Mountains Wild Horse range is good, but there are no maintained or marked trails and (as of 2000) no guidebooks to the area.

In addition to feral horses, the Pryor Mountains Wild Horse Refuge is a good place to see other wildlife and plant species. Among the species found there are Rocky Mountain bighorn sheep, black bears, blue grouse, cougars, elk, gray wolves, mule deer, ring-necked pheasant, and sage grouse. The Pryor Mountains are also home to the most diverse bat populations in Montana, with 10 species identified (and potentially other species also present).

The range is also home to several animals which BLM or the state of Montana considers sensitive to ecological change, such as Baird's sparrow, long-eared myotis (a species of vesper bat), pallid bat, peregrine falcon, spotted bat, Townsend's big-eared bat, and Yellowstone cutthroat trout. There are 15 species of plants on the range which have been granted special status by the state of Montana or the federal government.

This herd was the subject of the 1995 documentary film Cloud: Wild Stallion of the Rockies and its sequel, the 2003 documentary film Cloud's Legacy: The Wild Stallion Returns.

== Bibliography ==
- Billings Field Office. Pryor Mountain Wild Horse Range/Territory. Environmental Assessment MT-10-08-24 and Herd Management Area Plan. Bureau of Land Management. U.S. Department of the Interior. May 2009.
- Clawson, Roger and Shandera, Katherine A. Billings: The City and the People. Billings, Mont.: Billings Gazette, 1993.
- Cothran, E. Gus. Genetic Analysis of the Pryor Mountains HMA, MT. Bureau of Land Management. U.S. Department of the Interior. September 2, 2010.
- Cruise, David and Griffiths, Alison. Wild Horse Annie and the Last of the Mustangs: The Life of Velma Johnston. New York: Scribner, 2010.
- Crutchfield, James A. It Happened in Montana. Guilford, Conn.: TwoDot, 2008.
- Dutson, Judith. Storey's Illustrated Guide to 96 Horse Breeds of North America. North Adams, Mass.: Storey Publishing, 2005.
- Evans, J. Warren. Horses: A Guide to Selection, Care, and Enjoyment. New York: W.H. Freeman/Owl Book, 2002.
- Fischer, Carol and Fischer, Hank. Montana Wildlife Viewing Guide. Helena, Mont.: Falcon, 1995.
- Flores, Dan Louie. Horizontal Yellow: Nature and History in the Near Southwest. Albuquerque, N.M.: University of New Mexico Press, 1999.
- Government Accountability Office. Bureau of Land Management: Effective Long-Term Options Needed to Manage Unadoptable Wild Horses. GAO-09-77. Washington, D.C.: Government Accountability Office, October 2008.
- Glover, Kristen H. "Managing Wild Horses on Public Lands: Congressional Action and Agency Response." North Carolina Law Review. 79:1108 (May 2001).
- Gordon, Paul and Krumm, Bob. Bighorn Canyon National Recreation Area. Tucson, Ariz.: Southwest Parks and Monuments Association, 1999.
- Hill, Cherry. Cherry Hill's Horsekeeping Almanac: The Essential Month-by-Month Guide for Everyone Who Keeps or Cares for Horses. North Adams, Mass.: Storey Publishing, 2007.
- Hill, Cherry and Klimesh, Richard. Horse Hoof Care. North Adams, Mass.: Storey Publishing, 2009.
- Hodges, Montana and Feldman, Robert. Rockhounding Montana. Guilford, Conn.: Globe Pequot Press, 2006.
- Iraola, Roberto. "The Wild Free-Roaming Horses and Burros Act of 1971." Environmental Law. 35:1049 (Fall 2005).
- Kirkpatrick, Jay F. and Gilluly, Mary S. "Transferrin and Hemoglobin Polymorphism in Feral Horses (Equus caballus)." Northwest Science. 62:l (1988).
- Lynghaug, Fran. The Official Horse Breeds Standards Guide. Minneapolis: Voyageur Press, 2009.
- Massingham, Rhonda. Among Wild Horses: A Portrait of the Pryor Mountain Mustangs. North Adams, Mass.: Storey Publishing, 2006.
- Mautz, William W. 1978. "Nutrition and Carrying Capacity." In Big Game of North America. J. L. Schmidt and D. L. Gilbert, eds. Harrisburg, Pa.: Stackpole Books, 1978.
- McRae, W.C. and Jewell, Judy. Montana. Berkeley, Calif.: Avalon Travel, 2009.
- Neil, J. Meredith. To the White Clouds: Idaho's Conservation Saga, 1900–1970. Pullman, Wash.: Washington State University Press, 2005.
- Pitt, Kenneth. "The Wild Free-Roaming Horses and Burros Act: A Western Melodrama." Environmental Law. 15:503 (Spring 1985).
- Pomeranz, Lynn. Among Wild Horses. Pownal, Vt.: Godalming, 2006.
- Rowles, Genevieve. Adventure Guide to Montana. Edison, N.J.: Hunter Publishing, 2000.
- Ryden, Hope. America's Last Wild Horses: The Classic Study of the Mustangs—Their Pivotal Role in the History of the West, Their Return to the Wild, and the Ongoing Efforts to Preserve Them. Guilford, Conn.: Lyons Press, 1999.
- Silverstein, Alvin; Silverstein, Virginia B.; and Nunn, Laura Silverstein. The Mustang. Brookfield, Conn.: Millbrook Press, 1997.
- Singer, Francis J. and Schoenecker, Kathryn A. Manager's Summary—Ecological Studies of the Pryor Mountain Wild Horse Range, 1992–1997. Fort Collins, Colo.: U.S. Dept. of the Interior, U.S. Geological Survey, 1997.
- Unti, Bernard Oreste. Protecting All Animals: A Fifty-Year History of the Humane Society of the United States. Washington, D.C.: Humane Society Press, 2004.
- Wilderness Study Areas. National Landscape Conservation System. Bureau of Land Management. United States Department of the Interior. March 11, 2010.
