= New Mexico Livestock Board =

State-level government agency

Regulatory agency overview
- Formed: 1967
- Preceding agencies: New Mexico Cattle Sanitary Board; New Mexico Sheep Sanitary Board
- Jurisdiction: Government of New Mexico
- Website: https://www.nmlbonline.com/

The New Mexico Livestock Board is a state-level government agency regulates livestock health and livestock identification in New Mexico.

== History ==
The board was created in 1967 by the merger of the New Mexico Cattle Sanitary Board and the New Mexico Sheep Sanitary Board.

== Responsibilities ==
The New Mexico Livestock Board maintains regulatory control over livestock now includes cattle, horses, mules, donkeys (burros), goats, sheep, pigs, bison, poultry, ratites (notably ostriches), camelids (notably llamas) and farmed deer. The regulatory authority does not include farmed fish, nor dogs or cats.

Every three years, the Board publishes a Brand Book, which serves as the basis for livestock identification in New Mexico.

=== Livestock health ===
The New Mexico Livestock Board maintains health programs in:

- Bovine Brucellosis
- Bovine Trichimoniasis
- Bovine Tuberculosis
- Bovine Johne's Disease
- Equine Infections Anemia (EIA)
- Scrapie
- Swine Health Surveillance

== See also ==
- Kleppe v. New Mexico
