= Wild and Free-Roaming Horses and Burros Act of 1971 =

1971 Act of Congress

- Long title: An Act to require the protection, management, and control of wild free-roaming horses and burros on public lands.
- Acronyms (colloquial): WFRHBA
- Enacted by: the 92nd United States Congress
- Effective: December 15, 1971

Citations
- Public law: 92-195
- Statutes at Large: 85 Stat. 649

Codification
- Titles amended: 16 U.S.C.: Conservation
- U.S.C. sections created: 16 U.S.C. ch. 30 § 1331 et seq.

Legislative history
- Introduced in the Senate as S. 1116 by Henry M. Jackson (D–WA) on June 25, 1971; Committee consideration by Senate Insular and Interior Affairs, House Insular and Interior Affairs; Passed the Senate on June 29, 1971 (Passed); Passed the House on October 4, 1971 (Passed, in lieu of H.R. 9890); Reported by the joint conference committee on November 29, 1971; agreed to by the House on December 2, 1971 (Agreed) and by the Senate on December 3, 1971 (Agreed); Signed into law by President Richard Nixon on December 15, 1971

Major amendments
- Sections 1332 and 1333 were modified by the Public Rangelands Improvement Act of 1978 (Public Law 95-514); Section 1338 was modified by the Federal Land Policy and Management Act of 1976 (Public Law 94-579); the Omnibus Parks and Public Lands Management Act of 1996 (Public Law 104-333) added Section 1338a.; and Section 1333 was again modified by the Fiscal Year 2005 Omnibus Appropriations Act (Public Law 108-447)

United States Supreme Court cases
- Kleppe v. New Mexico, 426 U.S. 529 (1976)

The Wild and Free-Roaming Horses and Burros Act of 1971 (WFRHBA), is an Act of Congress (Pub. L. 92–195), signed into law by President Richard M. Nixon on December 18, 1971. The act covers the management, protection, and study of "unbranded and unclaimed horses and burros on public lands in the United States."

By the 1900s, feral horse populations were in decline, and there was concern that the horses were destroying land and resources wanted by ranching and hunting interests. Pressure on federal agencies from the 1930s on led to a series of policies that severely reduced herd numbers. By the 1950s, modern practices for capturing horses came to the attention of people such as Velma Bronn Johnston, also known as "Wild Horse Annie", who felt the measures were extreme and cruel. Their activism resulted in the Hunting Wild Horses and Burros on Public Lands Act in 1959. But the 1959 Act did not resolve all the advocates' concerns, leading to the passage of the Wild and Free-Roaming Horses and Burros Act in 1971. The Bureau of Land Management (BLM) and US Forest Service manage these herds. Although the BLM struggled to implement adequate herd management in many areas, in 1973 it began a successful program to round up excess numbers, and adopt out these captured horses and burros to private owners. This remains the primary method of removing excess horses and burros from managed land, but in recent years the adoption rate has not kept up with the removal rate, and most horses are now diverted to long-term holding facilities. Administrative challenges to BLM's management and implementation of the act have been made to the Department of the Interior's Board of Land Appeals.

The act has also been challenged in court. Objections have varied, focusing on constitutionality and the animals' legal status, but the Act has been upheld in all instances, including Kleppe v. New Mexico, before the United States Supreme Court. It has also been alleged that the BLM has turned a blind eye to the practice of private investors adopting feral horses for the purposes of slaughter, and courts have held that the BLM may not ignore adopters' intent. Congress has taken several actions that affect the act by including provisions in other bills. These provisions have addressed the manner in which horses may be rounded up and the method by which they may be offered for sale or adoption.

== Contents ==
The act provides specific protections to "all unbranded and unclaimed horses and burros on public lands of the United States," and makes it a crime for anyone to harass or kill these animals on federal land. It requires the departments of the Interior and Agriculture to protect the animals. Beginning with its enactment, it required studies of the habits and habitats of free-ranging horses and burros, permitting public land to be set aside for their use. In addition, the act required that these horses and burros be protected as "living symbols of the historic and pioneer spirit of the West." The BLM was tasked with identification of the areas where free-roaming horses and burros were found; there was no specific amount of acreage set aside, and the Act required management plans to "maintain a thriving natural ecological balance among wild horse populations, wildlife, livestock, and vegetation and to protect the range from the deterioration associated with overpopulation." Although wild horse ranges were principally for the protection of the horses, the land was required to be maintained for multiple use. The BLM was also permitted to close public land to livestock grazing to protect wild horse and burro habitat.

== History ==
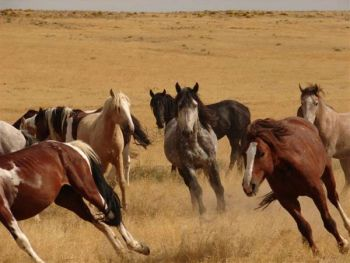
Free-roaming horses in Utah

Although the Act uses the technical language "wild free-roaming" to describe the horses and burros protected under the Act, the BLM notes that "today's American wild horses should not be considered 'native'." All protected animals descend from domesticated horses and burros brought to the Americas beginning in the 1500s. Some escaped to the wild while others were released, and over the ensuing centuries, these feral animals adapted to the Western range. Due to the Act, the BLM manages horses and burros as "wild" regardless of their native or non-native status.

Free-roaming horses could once be found throughout much of the American frontier west of the Mississippi River, and may have numbered as many as two million around 1850. However, no comprehensive estimate of free-roaming horse numbers was done until 1971, and thus early estimates are speculative. Horse numbers were in decline as domestic cattle and sheep competed with them for resources. Ranchers shot horses to leave more grazing land for other livestock, other horses were captured off the range for human use, and some were rounded up for slaughter.

By the end of the 1920s, free-roaming horses mostly lived on United States General Land Office (GLO)-administered lands and National Forest rangelands in 11 Western States. Their genetic origins were diverse, reflecting the American westward expansion from the mid-1800s on. Their bloodlines included horses of Spanish-Barb descent as well as draft and saddle horses turned loose on the open range.

Management of horses running on the range was initially left to Mustangers and local ranchers, but in 1934, the Taylor Grazing Act (TGA) established the United States Grazing Service (Grazing Service) to manage livestock grazing on public lands. The TGA authorized the Grazing Service to grant ranchers individual grazing allotments and set fees for grazing. The fee to graze a horse was twice that for a cow, and as a result, ranchers allowed unbranded horses to run loose rather than pay for them. At the time the Taylor Grazing Act was passed, it was estimated that 50,000-150,000 horses roamed wild on public land subject to the Act. The Grazing Service, along with the Forest Service, was committed to removing the free-roaming horses, which were viewed as mavericks, from the lands they administered. In 1939, the Grazing Service began to directly hire people to remove horses from public land. The United States Forest Service periodically gave ranchers notice to round up their strays and thereafter shot any remaining horses.

In 1946, the BLM was formed by combining the General Land Office and the Grazing Service. It no longer directly removed horses from the lands it administered, but issued permits to hunters. It is unknown how many free-roaming horses were on the public lands at that time, and it is not clear if there were too many horses, or if the land was incurring damage due to the presence of the horses, but removal probably exceeded the animals' reproductive rate, resulting in a decline in numbers. After World War II, captured horses were often slaughtered to meet the demands of the pet food market.

By the 1950s, the free-roaming horse population was down to an estimated 25,000 animals. Horses were being chased to exhaustion by airplanes, poisoned at water holes, and removed with other inhumane practices. Between 1950 and 1959, led by Velma Bronn Johnston—better known as "Wild Horse Annie,"—animal welfare and horse advocates lobbied for passage of a federal law to prevent the capture of wild horse by inhumane methods. Their efforts were successful. On September 8, 1959, President Dwight D. Eisenhower signed into law the Hunting Wild Horses and Burros on Public Lands Act, Pub. L. 86–2345, also known as the "Wild Horse Annie Act", which banned the hunting of feral horses on federal land from aircraft or motorized vehicles.

Ownership of free-roaming herds remained contentious, and ranchers continued to use airplanes to gather them. Horses were still subject to individual states' estray laws, and no law prevented the complete elimination of horse herds. Federal agencies also continued to try to eliminate horses from areas where they were perceived to be causing resource damage. Under BLM policy, ranchers could release a branded mare into a herd then later round up not only the mare, but the band the mare ran with, for slaughter or sale. In Nevada, state law permitted ranchers to round up any unbranded horses on their private land and slaughter or sell them. Concerned about these practices, and about continuing horse hunts in unprotected areas, International Society for the Protection of Mustangs and Burros of which Johnston was the first president, began working to pass federal legislation to protect feral horses throughout the U.S. She was joined by a number of prominent people, including country music singer Judy Lynn, Gunsmoke actress Amanda Blake, and Manchester Union Leader publisher and conservative William Loeb III, who continued to lobby for federal rather than state control over the disposition of free-roaming horses.

In 1962, public pressure lead to the establishment of the Nevada Wild Horse Range, and in 1968, the Pryor Mountains Wild Horse Range was established. In 1969, the National Mustang Association, headquartered in Utah, persuaded Senator Frank Moss to introduce a bill (S-2166) to protect the remaining mustangs of Spanish descent under the Endangered Species Act of 1966. However, since the bill also called for the removal from public lands of all non-Spanish horses, it came under heavy opposition.

Federal protection for all free-roaming horses was ultimately accomplished by the passage of the Wild and Free-Roaming Horses and Burros Act of 1971, which specifically states: "A person claiming ownership of a horse or burro on the public lands shall be entitled to recover it only if recovery is permissible under the branding and estray laws of the State in which the animal is found." which alleviated the problem of horses being rounded up under the auspices of belonging to local ranchers. Ranchers were given a specified time period following passage of the Act to claim their horses, and any remaining unbranded and unclaimed herds roaming BLM or Forest Service became the property of the federal government.

== Implementation ==
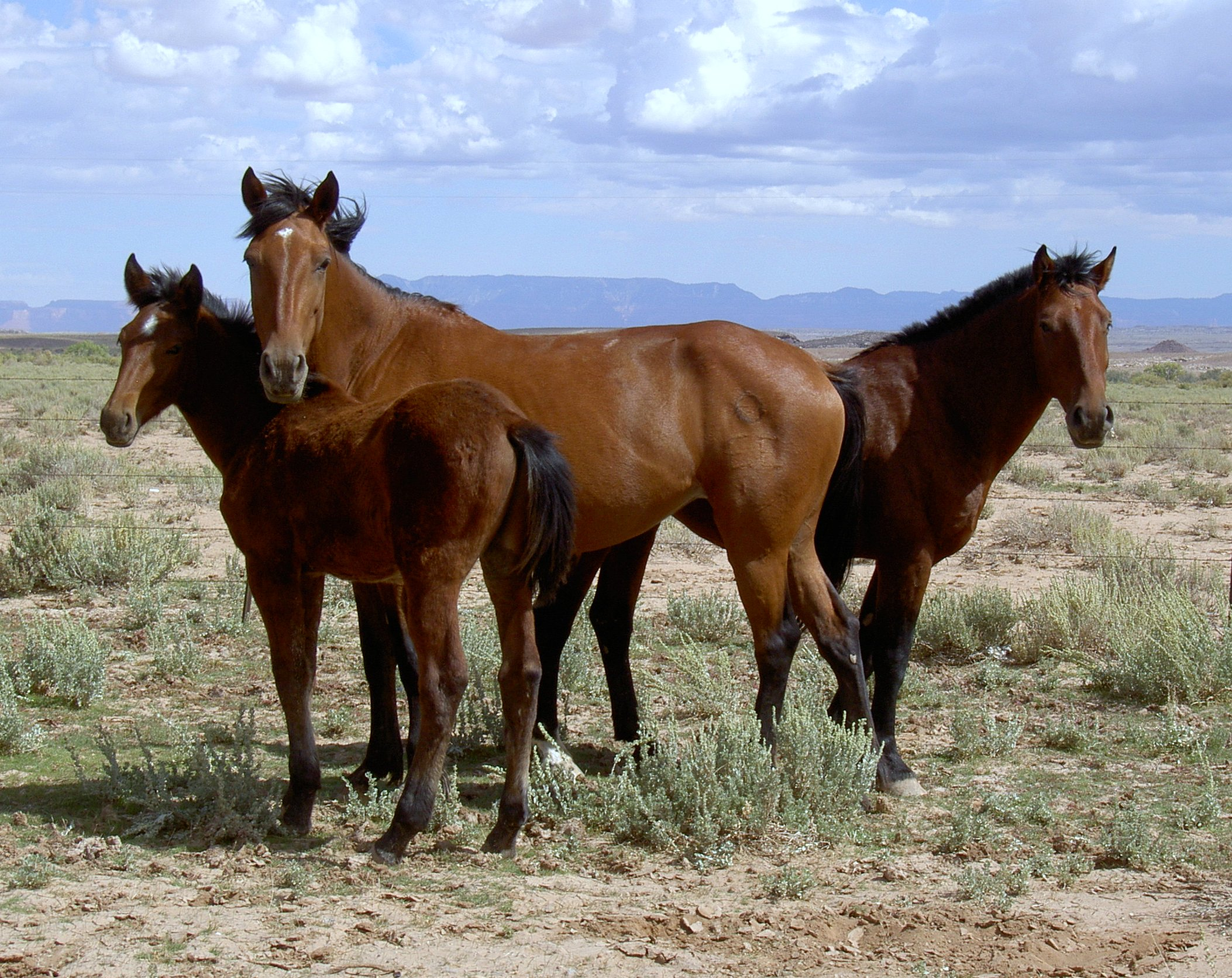
Mustangs in Arizona

The Act gave jurisdiction over challenges to BLM and Forest Service management of wild horses and how the act is implemented to the Department of the Interior's Board of Land Appeals. The act also contained provisions for the removal of excess animals; the destruction of lame, old, or sick animals; the private placement or adoption of excess animals; and even the destruction of healthy animals if range management required it. Revisions proposed in 1974 increased concern that destruction of free-roaming horses could resume. However, the destruction of healthy or unhealthy horses almost never occurred, and in January 1982, the director of BLM issued a moratorium on the destruction of excess adoptable animals.

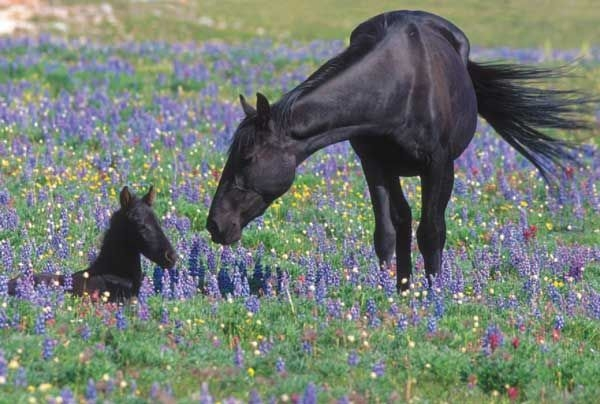
A mare attends to her foal on the Pryor Mountains Wild Horse Refuge.

The Act left range management policy unresolved in many respects, although it did specify that BLM and the Forest Service consult with state wildlife agencies. In practice, BLM struggled to accommodate the needs of feral horses among its other priorities (which included livestock grazing, prevention of soil erosion, and accommodating big game hunting). In November 1971, the BLM announced a major effort to save the Pryor Mountain herd from starvation after a poor summer growing season left vegetation on the range stunted. By 1974, the herd on the Pryor Mountain range was said to have increased by 17 percent over the 1968 level, but there was strong disagreement over whether the population had actually increased.

Pursuant to the 1978 amendments to the Public Rangelands Improvement Act (PRIA), the BLM established 209 herd management areas (HMAs) where feral horses were permitted to live on federal land. As of 2013, the number of HMAs had been reduced to 179, covering 31.6 million acres. Three HMAs are dedicated solely to the protection of feral horses: the Pryor Mountains Wild Horse Range in Montana, the Little Book Cliffs Wild Horse Range in Colorado and the Nevada Wild Horse Range in Nevada. Another HMA is dedicated to feral burros, the Marietta Wild Burro Range, also in Nevada.

In 1973, BLM began a pilot project on the Pryor Range known as the Adopt-A-Horse initiative. The program took advantage of provisions in the Act to allow private "qualified" individuals to "adopt" as many horses as they wanted if they could show that they could provide adequate care for the animals. At the time, title to the horses remained permanently with the U.S. federal government. The pilot project was so successful that BLM allowed it to go nationwide in 1976. In 1978, Public Rangelands Improvement Act (PRIA) authorized the BLM to relinquish title to adopted horses after one year of satisfactory private maintenance. Through 2001, the Adopt-a-Horse program was the primary method of disposal of excess feral horses from BLM and Forest Service land.

Despite the success of the adoption program, the BLM struggled to maintain acceptable herd levels, as without natural predators, herd sizes can double every four years. As of 2013, there were over 40,000 horses and burros on BLM-managed land, exceeding the BLM's estimated "appropriate management level" (AML) by almost 14,000. In addition to these on-range horses, there are 49,000 additional wild horses, also protected under the Act, living in off-range corrals and pastures.

The BLM uses limited amounts of contraceptives to control herd numbers, in the form of PZP vaccinations; advocates say that additional use of these vaccines would help to diminish the excess number of horses currently under BLM management. As of 2013, the BLM is also researching the possibility of spaying some mares to permanently prevent pregnancies, and a new vaccine, the "first single-shot, multiyear wildlife contraceptive for use in mammals", has been approved for use by the Environmental Protection Agency.

From 1988 to 2004, Congress prohibited BLM from using any funds to destroy excess animals. In 2008, the BLM announced the possibility of euthanizing excess horses, a move which was quickly condemned by horse advocates.

== Legal challenges ==
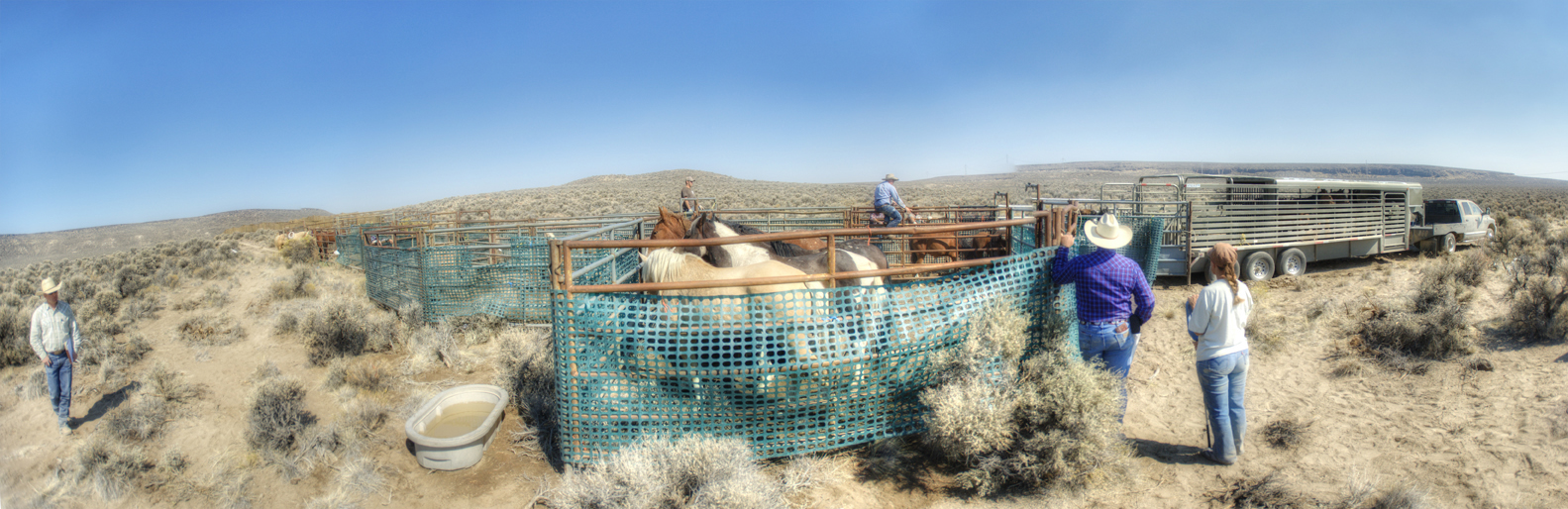
A gather of horses from the Paisley Desert Herd Management Area

The constitutionality of the new law was disputed. Up until then, feral horses and burros were considered to be under the jurisdiction of State estray laws, and managed as unclaimed livestock that the Federal government had no right to interfere with. To test this assertion, in 1974 the New Mexico Livestock Board seized 19 free-roaming feral burros which were preventing cattle from using a watering hole on federal land. The United States District Court for the District of New Mexico held that, under the Property Clause of the U.S. Constitution, Congress could regulate "wild" animals only to protect public land from damage. The case went to the Supreme Court of the United States. In Kleppe v. New Mexico, 426 U.S. 529 (1976), the Supreme Court ruled that Congress's power to manage public land "necessarily includes the power to regulate and protect the wildlife living there." and that, unclaimed free-roaming horses could be considered "wildlife" for purposes of determining whether Congress has the power to protect them. In United States v. Johnson, 685 F.2d 337 (9th Cir. 1982) the act was challenged in court for being unconstitutionally vague and unconstitutionally overbroad in its definition of "unbranded and unclaimed horses". The United States Court of Appeals for the Ninth Circuit upheld the wording of the act.-

In the early 1980s, the Mountain States Legal Foundation (foundation) and the Rock Springs Grazing Association (association) won a writ of mandamus by the District Court requiring the BLM to remove all horses from the private lands of the "checkerboard" of private and public lands grazed by the association, and to reduce the number of horses on the public lands. The District Court, however issued a summary judgement for the government against the contention that feral horses who ate grass or drank water on privately owned lands had "taken" these resources from the ranchers in violation of the "takings clause" of the Fifth Amendment to the U.S. Constitution and the government must compensate the private landowners $500,000. The foundation appealed the summary judgement to the United States Court of Appeals for the Tenth Circuit. In Mountain States Legal Foundation v. Hodel, 799 F.2d 1423 (1986), cert. den'd. 480 U.S. 951 (1987), the appeals court remanded the summary judgement back to the district court, which ultimately ruled that a wild animal was not an "agent" of the federal government and hence could not be found guilty of "taking" the ranchers' grass or water. However, in 2000, the "takings" argument was brought up again, this time in Bradshaw v. United States U.S. Court of Federal Claims 47 Fed.Cl. 549 (Sept. 15, 2000) wherein the plaintiffs held that free-roaming horses were taking forage that they paid for with their grazing permit, and the horses were drinking water from springs for which they owned the water rights. The court dismissed the argument, referring back to the earlier court findings.

Although the PRIA limited the number of horses that could be adopted in any one year by a single adopter to four, it allowed the BLM to make exceptions to the limit. In the mid-1980s, the BLM had placed for adoption over 20,000 horses to large scale adopters, and thousands of the horses were slaughtered. In March 1987, the Animal Protection Institute sued the Department of the Interior, arguing that BLM was turning a blind eye to "adopters" who obtained horses with the intent to slaughter. In Animal Protection Institute v. Hodel, 671 F. Supp. 695 (1987), the United States District Court for the District of Nevada held that BLM could not ignore the intent of adopters. The decision was upheld by the Ninth Circuit Court of Appeals in Animal Protection Institute v. Hodel, 860 F.2d 920 (1988). In 1988, the BLM terminated the large scale adoption program. In 1997, the Animal Protection Institute and BLM signed an out-of-court settlement under which BLM would require individuals to sign an affidavit stating they had no intent to sell the animal for slaughter or for use as rodeo stock. The settlement also required BLM to establish rules requiring horse slaughterhouses to maintain paperwork on horses for no less than one year and to report any horses to which clear title was not established. BLM also agreed to no longer permit adoption by proxy or power of attorney. But the district court refused to enforce this settlement in 2000, leaving the issue unresolved.

In November 1996, Congress passed the Omnibus Parks and Public Lands Management Act, which clarified the earlier 1976 amendment to the Act authorizing BLM and the Forest Service to use helicopters and motor vehicles to round up and transport feral horses on public lands. The use of helicopters in roundups has been challenged by feral-horse advocates on the grounds that they are dangerous to the horses. In 2011, a case was brought before the U.S. District Court in Nevada, regarding a roundup in that state, alleging in part that helicopter pilots flew too close to horses. The judge in that case issued a temporary restraining order against the "mistreatment of mustangs during BLM gathers", including inadequate distance between helicopters and animals. In 2013, the BLM issued new policy directives covering humane treatment of animals during roundups, including the use of helicopters, and stated that "further animal handling policy changes [are expected] in the future".

== Subsequent Congressional action ==
In 1976, Congress included a provision in the Federal Land Policy and Management Act that permitted the humane use of helicopters in capturing free-roaming horses on federal land, and for the use of motorized vehicles in transporting them to corrals. When problems with the Adopt-a-Horse program emerged and the BLM was accused of allowing too many adoptions so as to deplete feral horse populations on federal land and allowing "adopted" horses to sell for slaughter, in 1978 Congress passed the Public Rangelands Improvement Act (PRIA). The PRIA limited adoptions to only four horses a year per individual and allowed BLM to relinquish title to the horse after one year (during which inspections regarding the animal's treatment were to occur). The law also required BLM to inventory all feral horse herds, scientifically determine what constituted "appropriate" herd levels, and determine through a public process whether "excess" animals should be removed. Congress further amended PRIA in 1978 to require updated herd counts.

In 2004, Republican Senator from Montana Conrad Burns inserted a rider into the Consolidated Appropriations Act of 2005 (a 3,000-page omnibus appropriations bill) which amended the WFRHBA to require the BLM to sell excess animals more than 10 years old or which have been offered for adoption three times. The amendment also required that excess, unadoptable horses "shall be made available for sale without limitation." Burns was reportedly acting on behalf of ranching interests, who wished more of the horses removed from federal land. The legislation, signed into law by President George W. Bush, was described by one media outlet as "undercut[ing] more than three decades of lobbying and legislative action aimed at protecting America's wild horses from slaughter". In May, 2005 the "Rahall Amendment" was passed to limit implementation of the Burns amendment by preventing appropriated funds to be used to facilitate the sale and slaughter of protected wild horses and burros. In the 2007 Interior Appropriations Act the language of Rahall Amendment was re-added. As of August 2012, it remained in effect.

In early 2005, the BLM discovered that some of the excess wild horses it had sold had been slaughtered. BLM suspended the sales program in April 2005 and resumed it in May 2005 after implementing new requirements to deter buyers from slaughtering the animals. In the fall of 2007, the last three horse slaughterhouses in the United States closed. In January 2007, the United States Court of Appeals for the Fifth Circuit ruled that a 1949 Texas law banned the possession, transfer, or sale of horse meat. This ruling forced the two slaughterhouses in Texas to close. In September 2007, the United States Court of Appeals for the Seventh Circuit upheld a similar ban in Illinois, causing the plant located in that state to close. (Note: See: Empacadora de Carnes de Fresnillo v. Curry, 476 F.3d 326 (5th Cir. 2007), cert. denied, 75 U.S.L.W. 3569 (2007); Cavel International, Inc. v. Madigan, 500 F.3d 551 (7th Cir. 2007), cert. denied, 76 U.S.L.W. 3410 (2008);) However, BLM procedures do not ban the export of wild horses for sale and slaughter outside the United States. In 2008, the Government Accountability Office (GAO) concluded BLM was not in compliance with the 2004 amendment, as the department had imposed limitations on the sale of excess horses to help ensure that they were not slaughtered. The GAO also stated that the BLM had a serious "dilemma" in the need to balance their charge to protect and preserve the feral horses with their charge to destroy or sell without limitation excess animals. It recommended that the BLM "develop cost-effective alternatives to the process of caring for wild horses removed from the range in long-term holding facilities and seek the legislative changes that may be necessary to implement those alternatives".

In February 2009, U.S. Representatives Nick Rahall, a Democrat from West Virginia, and Raul Grijalva, a Democrat from Arizona, introduced HR 1018, the "Restore Our American Mustangs Act". The act, if passed, would have amended the 1971 Act to increase available acreage for feral horses, develop additional sanctuaries, "[forbid] the killing of healthy animals, and [allow] greater public participation in herd management decisions." The bill passed a House vote on July 17, 2009 with a vote of 239 for and 185 against, but died in the Senate after being referred to the Senate Energy and Natural Resources Committee.

== See also ==
- Free-roaming horse management in North America
- Mustang Heritage Foundation
- Mustang Champions
