= Velma Bronn Johnston =

American wild horse advocate (1912 – 1977)

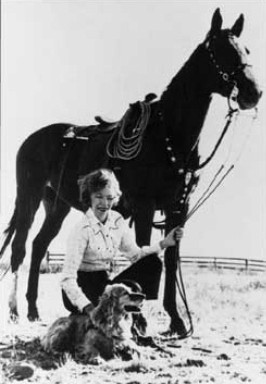
Velma Bronn Johnston with her horse and dog at her ranch

Velma Bronn Johnston (March 5, 1912 — June 27, 1977), also known as Wild Horse Annie, was an American animal welfare activist. She led a campaign to stop the eradication of mustangs and free-roaming burros from public lands. She was instrumental in passing legislation to stop using aircraft and land vehicles from inhumanely capturing wild horses and burros.

== Personal life ==
Velma Bronn was born in Reno, Nevada to Joseph Bronn and his wife Gertrude Clay, and grew up on Vine Street in Reno at her parents' home. In 1923 she contracted polio and was confined to a cast for six months. The cast deformed her body and face which her opponents used against her.

She married Charles Johnston and they moved to Wadsworth briefly, later buying property along the Truckee River near Painted Rock exit along I80. They named it the "Double Lazy Heart Ranch". According to Henry, Marguerite (1966). Mustang: Wild Spirit of the West. Simon and Schuster. ISBN 978-1-4814-5222-9.:

...it was supposed to be a dude ranch for children. That is not correct. The Double Lazy Heart brand was given to my brother when he bought property along the Truckee. Charlie became ill and they had a house built in Reno where they lived to the ends of their lives...

Johnston also worked as a secretary for an insurance company.

== Fight for humane treatment of free-roaming horses ==
Driving to work one day in 1950, Johnston was following a truck overcrowded with horses and saw blood dripping from the back. She followed it to a slaughterhouse, and upon learning they were free-roaming horses gathered from private and state lands in Nevada's Virginia Range, she took action to ensure more humane treatment of free-roaming horses when captured and transported.

On her initiative and Nevada State Senator Walter Baring's actions, Nevada passed a bill that made free-roaming roundups by planes and cars illegal on state and private lands. Although the free-roaming horses on all lands in the state were under the jurisdiction of the state estray laws, federal lands, administered chiefly by the Bureau of Land Management and the Forest Service, which comprise almost 85% of the lands in Nevada, were exempt from the law due to objections from the agencies that the law would hamper attempts to remove the horses from the federal lands. As large parts of Nevada were thereby excluded from the bill, Johnston continued to fight for protection of the free-roaming horses throughout the state and across all the federal lands in the west. She initiated a massive letter-writing campaign by students to Senators and other Congress members. On September 8, 1959, the campaign resulted in the federal legislature passing Public Law 86-234, which banned the poisoning of watering holes frequented by wild equids and the use of air and land vehicles in hunting and capturing free-roaming horses for sale and slaughter. This became known as the Wild Horse Annie Act.

Passage of the Wild Horse Annie Act did not alleviate the concerns of free-roaming horse advocates, who continued to lobby for federal rather than state control over the disposition of free-roaming horses. Since most horses in the desert regions were recently descended from ranchers' horses, ownership of the free-roaming herds was contentious, and ranchers continued to use airplanes to gather them. Johnston continued her campaign, and in 1971, the 92nd United States Congress unanimously passed the Wild and Free-Roaming Horses and Burros Act of 1971. It was signed into law by then-President Richard Nixon on December 15, 1971. The act prohibited capture, injury, or disturbance of free-roaming horses and burros.

== Legacy / dates ==
In 1959, Johnston was featured in Time magazine. The 1961 western The Misfits, based on a script by Arthur Miller, the last film of Clark Gable and Marilyn Monroe and also starring Montgomery Clift, portrayed a horse roundup of the sort Johnston had protested; in the film, Monroe's character becomes disgusted with the method, which leads to a climactic clash between the characters.

Johnston herself appeared in the Robert McCahon 1973 western Running Wild as herself, starring alongside Lloyd Bridges and Dina Merrill.

Johnston died at age 65 of lung cancer in Reno, Nevada on June 27, 1977. She is buried alongside her parents, husband and brother in the Mountain View Cemetery in Reno.

In March 2011, Wendie Malick was set to star and produce Wild Horse Annie, for Hallmark Channel for summer 2012.

Betty White was set to star in a Wild Horse Annie TV movie, after The Betty White Show (1977 TV series) was cancelled.
