= Horses in the United States =

Horses running at a ranch in Texas

Horses have been an important component of American life and culture since before the founding of the nation. In 2023, there were an estimated 6.65 million horses in the United States, with 1.5 million horse owners, 25 million citizens that participate in horse related activities, 12 million citizens that spectate at horse events, and 4.6 million citizens involved in businesses related to horses. There are an estimated 82,000 feral horses that roam freely in the wild in certain parts of the country, mostly in the Western United States.

While genus Equus, of which the horse is a member, originally evolved in North America, these horse relatives became extinct on the continent approximately 8,000–12,000 years ago. In 1493, on Christopher Columbus' second voyage to the Americas, Spanish horses, representing E. caballus, were brought back to North America, first to the Virgin Islands; they were introduced to the continental mainland by Hernán Cortés in 1519. From early Spanish imports to Mexico and Florida, horses moved north, supplemented by later imports to the east and west coasts brought by British, French, and other European colonists. Native peoples of the Americas quickly obtained horses and developed their own horse culture.

Horses remained an integral part of American rural and urban life until the 20th century, when the widespread emergence of mechanization caused their use for industrial, economic, and transportation purposes to decline. Modern use of the horse in the United States is primarily for recreation and entertainment, though some horses are still used for specialized tasks.

== History ==
=== Evolution ===
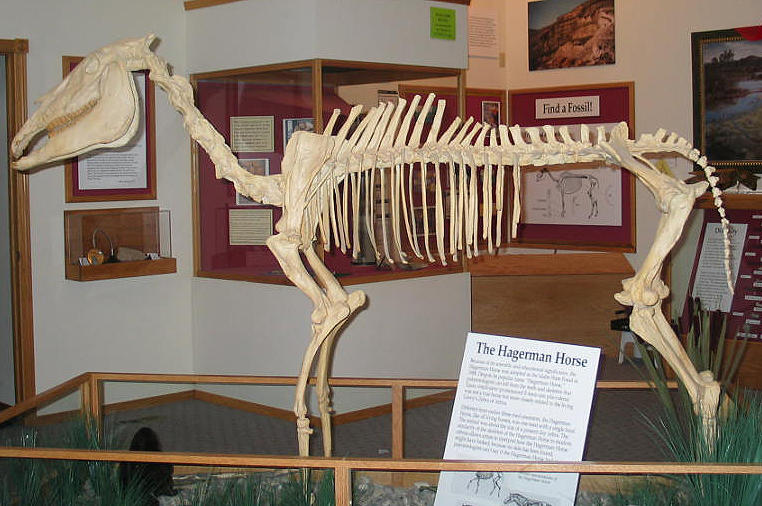
Hagerman horse skeleton

Fossils of the earliest direct ancestor to the modern horse, Eohippus, have been found in the Eocene layers of North American strata, mainly in the Wind River basin in Wyoming. Fossils found at the Hagerman Fossil Beds in Idaho, called the Hagerman horse or Equus simplicidens are from the Pliocene, dating to about 3.5 million years ago (mya). Paleontologists determined the fossils represented the oldest remains of the genus Equus. The genus Equus, which includes all extant equines, was plentiful in North America and spread into the Old World by about 2.5 mya.

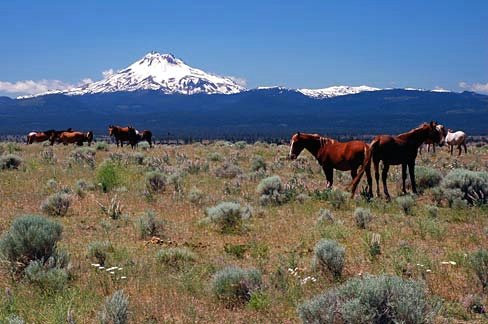
Horses on the Warm Springs Indian Reservation in north central Oregon, with Mount Jefferson in the background

A 2005 genetic study of fossils found evidence for three genetically divergent equid lineages in Pleistocene North and South America. A 2008 study suggested that all North American fossils of caballine-type horses, including both the domesticated horse and Przewalski's horse, belong to the same species: E. ferus. Remains attributed to a variety of species and lumped as New World stilt-legged horses belong to a second species that was endemic to North America, now called Haringtonhippus francisci. Digs in western Canada have unearthed clear evidence horses existed in North America as recently as 12,000 years ago. Other studies produced evidence that horses in the Americas existed until 8,000–10,000 years ago.

=== Extinction and return ===
Equidae in North America ultimately became extinct, along with most of the other New World megafauna during the Quaternary extinction event during the Pleistocene-Holocene transition. The causes of this extinction have been debated. Given the suddenness of the event and because these mammals had been flourishing for millions of years previously, something unusual must have happened. The first main hypothesis attributes extinction to climate change. For example, in Alaska, beginning approximately 12,500 years ago, the grasses characteristic of a steppe ecosystem gave way to shrub tundra, which was covered with unpalatable plants. However, it has also been proposed that the steppe-tundra vegetation transition in Beringia may have been a consequence, rather than a cause, of the extinction of megafaunal grazers.

The other hypothesis suggests extinction was linked to overexploitation of native prey by newly arrived humans. The extinctions were roughly simultaneous with the end of the most recent glacial advance and the appearance of the big game-hunting Clovis culture. Several studies have indicated humans probably arrived in Alaska at the same time or shortly before the local extinction of horses.

Horses returned to the Americas thousands of years later, well after domestication of the horse, beginning with Christopher Columbus in 1493. These were Iberian horses first brought to Hispaniola and later to Panama, Mexico, Brazil, Peru, Argentina, and, in 1538, Florida. The first horses to return to the main continent were 16 specifically identified horses brought by Hernán Cortés in 1519. Subsequent explorers, such as Coronado and De Soto brought ever-larger numbers, some from Spain and others from breeding establishments set up by the Spanish in the Caribbean.

These domesticated horses were the ancestral stock of the group of breeds or strains known today as the Colonial Spanish Horse. They predominated through the southeast and western United States (then New Spain) from 16th century until about 1850, when crossbreeding with larger horse breeds changed the phenotype and diluted the Spanish genetic features. Later, some horses became strayed, lost or stolen, and proliferated into large herds of feral horses that became known as mustangs. Modern domesticated horses that retain Colonial Spanish type include the Spanish Mustang, Choctaw horse, Florida Cracker horse, and the Marsh Tacky.

=== Historic period ===
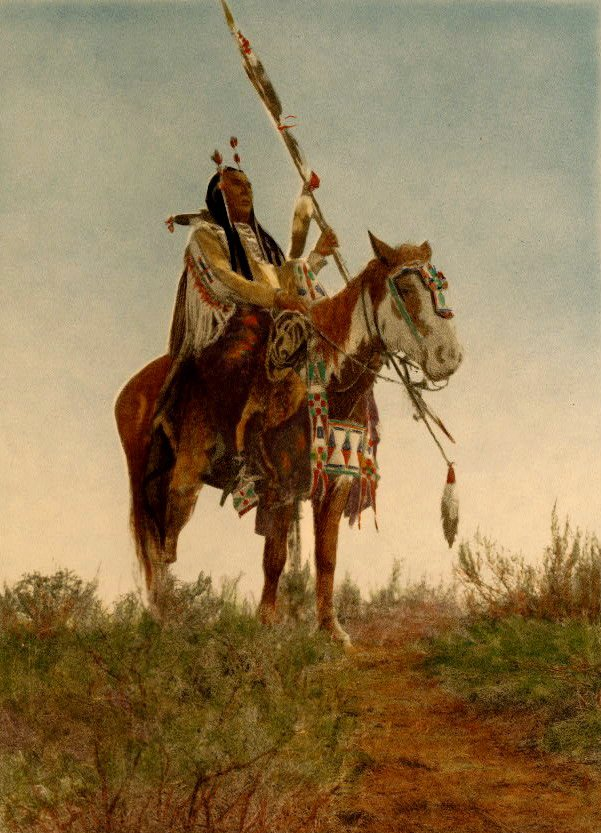
"Apsaroka Horse", depicting a horse of the Crow tribe, c. 1909

European settlers brought a variety of horses to the Americas. The first imports were smaller animals suited to the size restrictions imposed by ships. Starting in the mid-19th century, larger draft horses began to be imported, and by the 1880s, thousands had arrived. Formal horse racing in the United States dates back to 1665, when a racecourse was opened on the Hempstead Plains near Salisbury in what is now Nassau County, New York.

There are multiple theories for how Native American people obtained horses from the Spanish, but early capture of stray horses during the 16th century was unlikely due to the need to simultaneously acquire the skills to ride and manage them. It is unlikely that Native people obtained horses in significant numbers to become a horse culture any earlier than 1630. From a trade center in the Santa Fe, New Mexico area, the horse spread slowly north. The Comanche people were thought to be among the first tribes to obtain horses and use them successfully. By 1742, there were reports by white explorers that the Crow and Blackfoot people had horses, and probably had had them for a considerable time. The horse became an integral part of the lives and culture of Native Americans, especially the Plains Indians, who viewed them as a source of wealth and used them for hunting, travel, and warfare.

In the 19th century, horses were used for many jobs. In the west, they were ridden by cowboys for handling cattle on the large ranches of the region and on cattle drives. In cities, these including transporting people via carriage and horse-drawn public transport. They were used for hauling freight and for farming. In some cases, their labor was deemed more efficient than using steam-powered equipment to power certain types of mechanized equipment. At the same time, the maltreatment of horses in cities such as New York, where over 130,000 horses were used, led to the creation of the first ASPCA in 1866. In the 19th century, the Standardbred breed of harness racing horse developed in the United States, and many thoroughbred horse races were established.

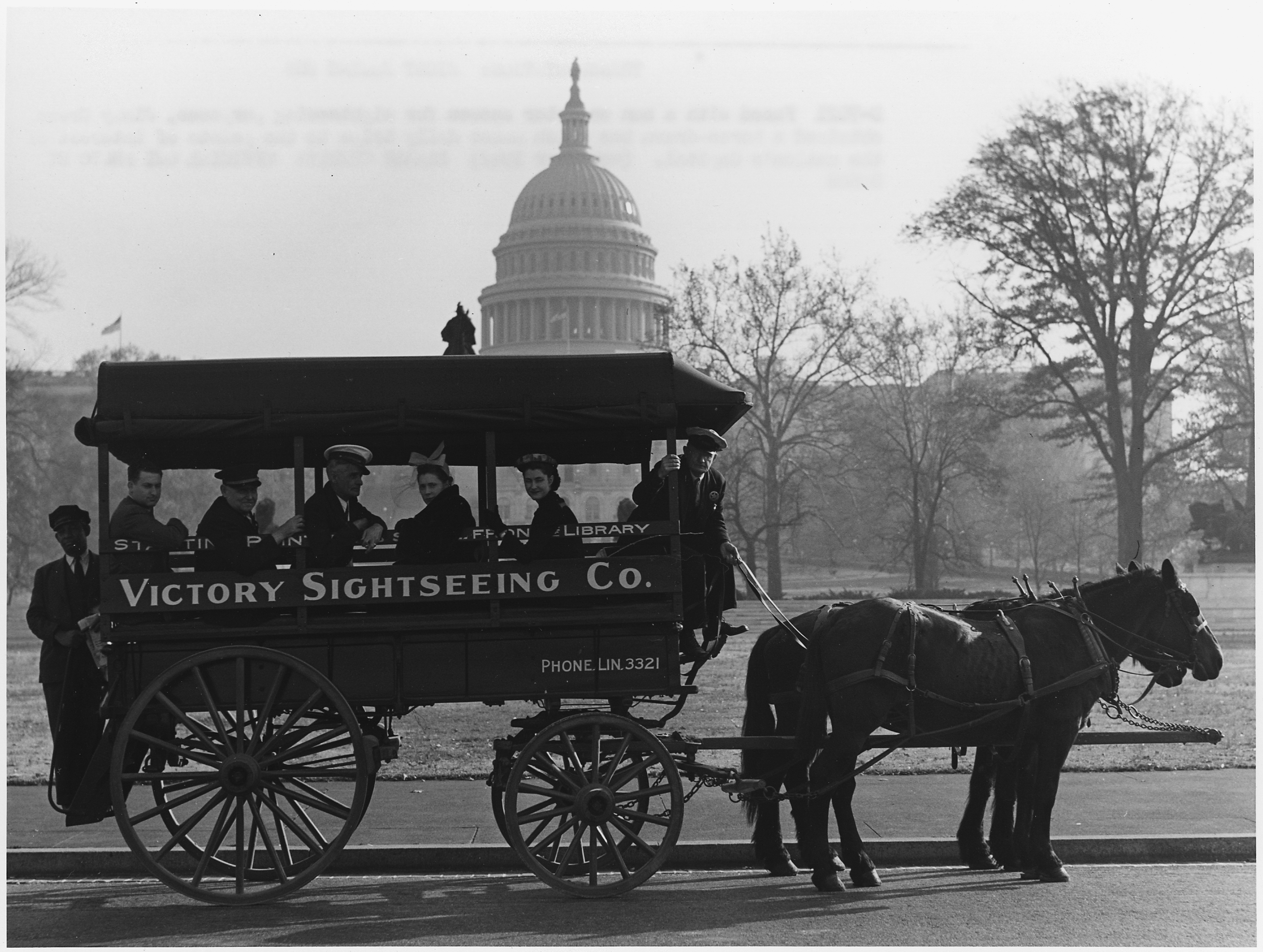
Horse-drawn sightseeing bus, 1942

At the start of the 20th century, the United States Department of Agriculture began to establish breeding farms for research, to preserve American horse breeds, and to develop horses for military and agricultural purposes. However, after the end of World War I, the increased use of mechanized transportation resulted in a decline in the horse populations, with a 1926 report noting horse prices were the lowest they had been in 60 years. Horse numbers rebounded in the 1960s, as horses came to be used for recreational purposes.

== Statistics ==
In 1912, Russia held the most horses in the world, with the U.S. having the second-highest number. There were an estimated 20 million horses in March 1915 in the United States. But as increased mechanization reduced the need for horses as working animals, populations declined. A USDA census in 1959 showed the horse population had dropped to 4.5 million. Numbers began to rebound somewhat, and by 1968 there were about 7 million horses, mostly used for riding. In 2023, there were about 6.65 million horses.

In 2013, the Bureau of Land Management (BLM) estimated there were about 82,000 feral horses in the United States under the supervision of the BLM on federal lands in the west. Additional feral horse populations exist elsewhere in the United States, especially on several islands off the Atlantic coast, where the National Park Service oversees populations of the Banker horse in North Carolina, the Cumberland Island horse in Georgia, and the horses on the Maryland side of Assateague Island, home to the Chincoteague pony. In Canada, a similar Atlantic population is the Sable Island horse of Nova Scotia.
