= List of U.S. state horses =

A map showing the states with official state horses marked in red and those with proposed designations marked in yellow

Thirteen U.S. states have designated a horse breed as the official "state horse", two have a horse breed as their "state animal", one has an official "state pony", and one has an "honorary state equine". The first state horse was designated in Vermont in 1961. The most recent state horse designations occurred in 2024 when Mississippi designated the American Quarter Horse as its state horse and in 2022 when Oklahoma declared the American Quarter Horse as its state horse. Arizona and New Mexico have designated through proclamation the Colonial Spanish Horse as the State Heritage Horse.

There have been proposals to designate a state horse in Oregon but the proposal is yet successful. In one state, North Dakota, the state horse is officially designated the "honorary state equine". Two additional states have not designated a specific state horse, but have designed a horse or horse breed as its official state animals: the horse in New Jersey and the Morgan horse breed in Vermont.

Some breeds, such as the American Quarter Horse in Texas and the Morgan horse in Vermont and Massachusetts, were named as the state horse because of the close connection between the history of the breed and the state. Others, including the Tennessee Walking Horse and the Missouri Fox Trotter, include the state in the official breed name. School children have lobbied for the cause of some state horses, such as the Colonial Spanish Horse being named the state horse of North Carolina due to the presence of the Spanish-descended Banker horses in the Outer Banks, while others have been brought to official status through the lobbying efforts of their breed registries.

Official state horses are one of many state symbols officially designated by states. Each state has its own flag and state seal, and many states also designate other symbols, including animals, plants, and foods. Such items usually are designated because of their ties to the culture or history of that particular state. In addition to being state symbols in their own right, horses have also appeared in state symbols; for example, a horse's head appears on the seal of New Jersey.

== State horses ==
State	Breed	Description	Image	Year designated	Ref.
Alabama	Racking Horse	The Racking Horse is a breed of horse known for its ambling gait. The breed association is headquartered in Decatur, Alabama.		1975	
Arizona State Heritage Horse	Colonial Spanish Horse	The Colonial Spanish Horse has a long history in Arizona, mainly through the Wilbur-Cruce strain, the only known Rancher strain from the Southwest Region.		2012	
Florida	Florida Cracker Horse	The Florida Cracker Horse was first brought to what is now Florida in the 1500s by Spanish explorers, and it played a large part in the development of the state's cattle and general agriculture industries.		2008	
Idaho	Appaloosa	The Appaloosa has made a substantial contribution to Idaho history, mainly through its association with the Nez Perce Indian tribe.		1975	
Kentucky	Thoroughbred	The Thoroughbred is the center of a multi-billion dollar breeding and racing industry in Kentucky.		1996	
Maryland	Thoroughbred	Maryland has a long history of breeding and racing Thoroughbreds, and today maintains an extensive network of breeding farms, training centers and racecourses.		2003	
Massachusetts	Morgan	The foundation sire of the Morgan breed, named Figure, was born in West Springfield, Massachusetts in 1789.		1970	
Mississippi	American Quarter Horse	The American Quarter Horse, is well-suited for the intricate and quick maneuvers required for rodeo events.		2024	
Missouri	Missouri Fox Trotter	The Fox Trotter is a gaited breed developed in the Missouri Ozarks.		2002	
New Jersey	Horse (state animal)	As of the designation of the horse as the state animal, New Jersey contained over 4,500 horse farms housing almost 40,000 horses and played host to a horse industry that extensively contributed to the preservation of natural lands in the state.		1977	
North Carolina	Colonial Spanish Mustang	This state breed references the Banker horse of the Outer Banks, descended from Spanish stock.		2010	
North Dakota	Nokota (honorary equine)	Nokota is a name given to a population of horses in the badlands of southwestern North Dakota, named after the Nakota Indian tribe that inhabited the area.		1993	
Oklahoma	American Quarter Horse	Oklahoma was home to Quarter Horses ridden by cowboys, Native Americans, pioneers, and others who built Oklahoma as a state.		2022	
South Carolina	Carolina Marsh Tacky	The Marsh Tacky was developed in the swampy Low Country region of South Carolina, and has played an integral part in the state's history.		2010	
Tennessee	Tennessee Walking Horse	The Tennessee Walker is a gaited breed initially developed in middle Tennessee.		2000	
Texas	American Quarter Horse	The history of the Quarter Horse is closely intertwined with that of Texas, where the breed was used for ranching and racing. The American Quarter Horse Association is headquartered in Amarillo, Texas.		2009	
Vermont	Morgan (state animal)	The Morgan breed was developed mainly in Vermont, where the founding stallion, Figure, lived most of his life and died in 1821.		1961	
Virginia	Chincoteague (state pony)	The Chincoteague herd is owned and managed by the volunteer fire company of the Chincoteague National Wildlife Refuge on Assateague Island. Although referred to as a pony breed, the Chincoteague is phenotypically a horse.		2023	

=== Proposed breeds ===
State	Breed	Description	Image	Year proposed	Ref.
Nevada	Mustang	Senate Bill 90 (SB90) would make the wild mustang Nevada's official state horse. However, the bill remains controversial.		2023	
Oregon	Kiger Mustang	The Kiger Mustang is a strain of Mustang found in a feral state only in southeastern Oregon.		2001	

== State symbols ==
Horses, both official state horses and not, are present in the emblems of several states.

State	Symbol	Image	Date	Ref.
Delaware	State quarter – Caesar Rodney on horseback		1999	
Idaho	License plate – Appaloosa		2003	
Kentucky	State quarter – Thoroughbred		2001	
Maryland	Obverse state seal – Knight on horseback		1969	
Minnesota	Former state seal – Native American on horseback		1858, 1971, 1983, 1987	
Nevada	State quarter – Mustang		2006	
New Jersey	State seal and coat of arms – Horse		1928	
Pennsylvania	Coat of arms and flag – Horses		Coat of arms: 1875; Flag: 1907	
