= Cumberland Island horse =

American breed of horse

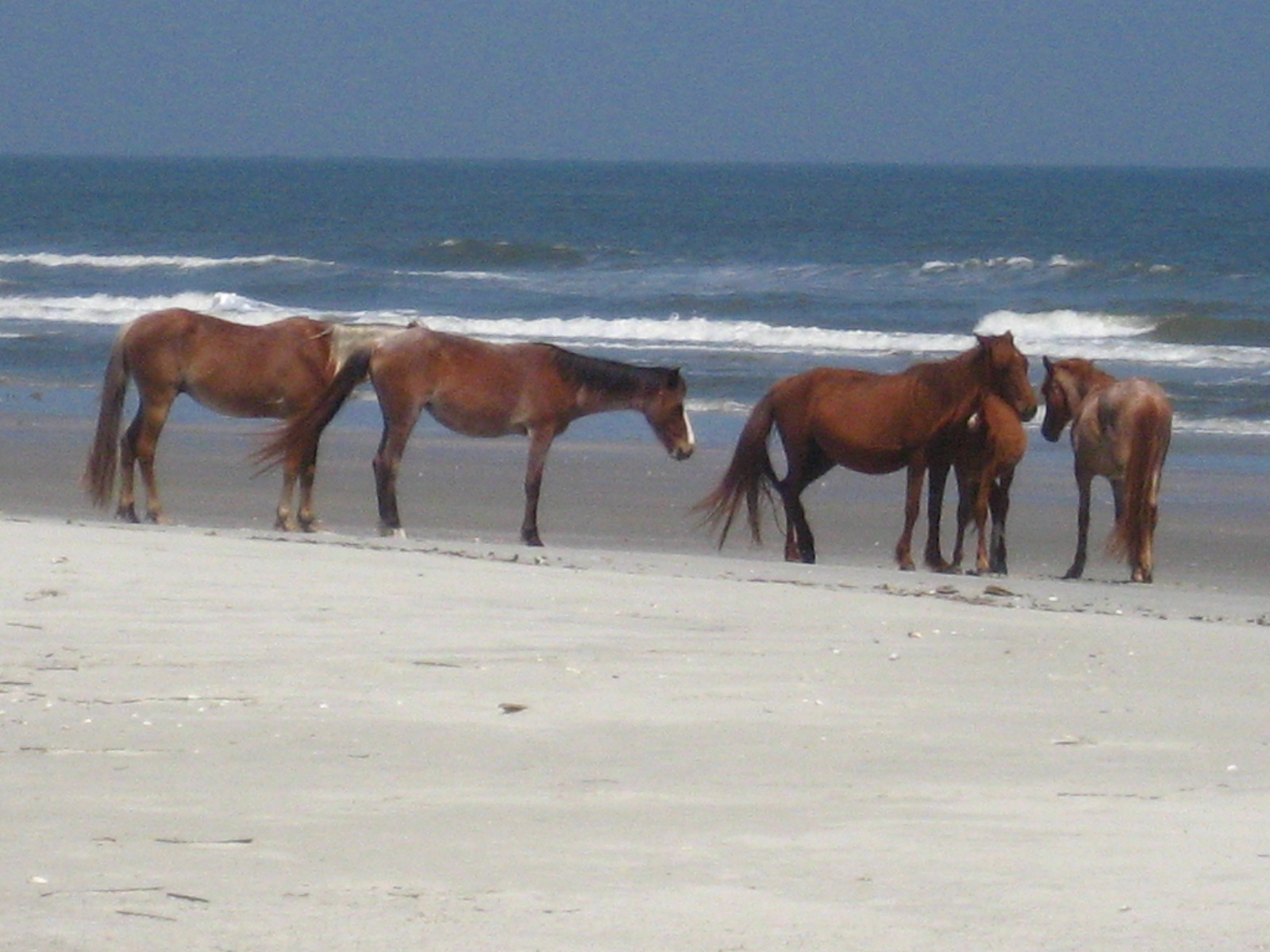
- Cumberland Island horses on the beach
- Country of origin: United States

The Cumberland Island horses are a band of feral horses living on Cumberland Island in the state of Georgia. Popular myth holds that horses arrived on the island sometime in the 16th century with the arrival of the Spanish conquistadors. However, it is unlikely that any horses left by the Spanish survived, and more likely the current population descends from horses brought to the island in the 18th century by the English. Cumberland Island became part of the Cumberland Island National Seashore in 1972 when the National Park Service (NPS) took over its management. These horses are similar to the bands of horses living on the islands of Chincoteague and Assateague. There is estimated to be a population of between 150 and 200 horses on the island. Horses on Cumberland Island have a relatively short life expectancy, due to pest infestations, disease and their rugged environment. In 2000 a behavioral study found that instability marks the bands, with large numbers of co-dominant stallions, early dispersal of juveniles, and frequent band-changing among mares.

The herd has been studied periodically since the late 1980s, with researchers recommending various management strategies depending on the focus of their study. Current herd levels have been shown to have a negative effect on their environment, and researchers focused on environmental issues recommend a severe reduction in herd numbers. Other researchers, looking at genetic variability, state that a herd size nearly as large as current is necessary to prevent inbreeding, but also state the herd is not genetically unique enough to warrant special preservation. The National Park Service has no current management plan for the horses, and their one effort to create one was blocked by Jack Kingston, a Georgia member of the US House of Representatives.

== History ==
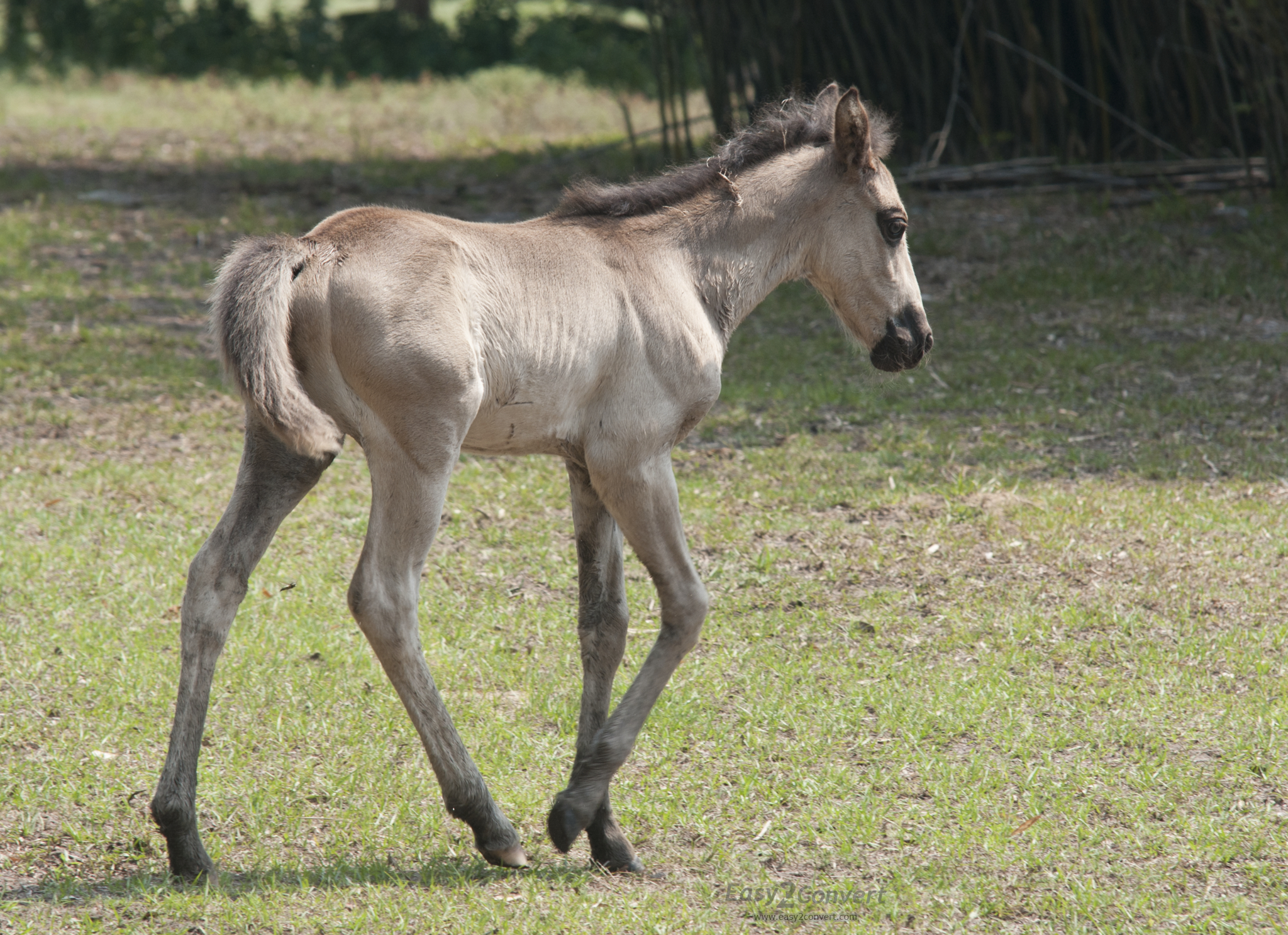
A Cumberland foal

Horses are not native to Cumberland Island. Popular myth states they were brought to the island by the Spanish in the 16th century. However, it is believed that these first horses more than likely did not survive due to the lack of visits made by the Spanish and the local Native Americans on the island finding them of little practical use. In the 18th century, the English began settling Cumberland Island. The horses seen there today are most likely descendants of horses brought by these settlers, as this is when a large majority of the horses began to roam freely and revert to their natural state, becoming feral. During the 19th century, efforts were made to capture and make use of the horses. The first attempts were made by the island plantation owner Robert Stafford, who allowed visitors to purchase and capture the horses, which Stafford called "marsh tackies," for their own personal use. The horses were next used as cavalry animals during the American Civil War. After the war, records suggest that people from Jekyll Island captured some of the horses for horse meat. Around 1881, Thomas M. Carnegie bought two plantations on the island and introduced Tennessee Walking Horses, Paso Finos, and Arabians into the feral horse population in an attempt to improve the animals. Carnegie received a small amount of income from the buying and selling of these animals. Later, many island residents began introducing additional breeds into the herds on the island, further diversifying the bands of horses. In 1921, a large number of horses were brought onto the island from Globe, Arizona, all of which had been running wild on western rangeland.

The National Park Service (NPS) acquired the island in 1972 and declared it the Cumberland Island National Seashore. Since then, few new horses have been introduced to the island, though four Arabians were introduced in the early 1990s in the hopes of diversifying and bettering the existing population. Since 1981, the NPS has been monitoring the horses and tracking their impact on the environment. In 1991, an outbreak of eastern equine encephalitis killed about 40 horses, or approximately 18% of the herd. The population on Cumberland Island is one of seven feral horse herds on US barrier islands.

== Characteristics ==
A 2009 resource assessment of the Cumberland Island National Seashore by the National Parks Conservation Association (NPCA) estimated that there were approximately 200 feral horses on Cumberland Island. As of 2010, 121 horses were counted on the island during the yearly census. Censuses conducted between 2000 and 2010 have counted between 120 and 154 horses. Not all horses are counted during the census, and park management estimates that approximately 50 horses are missed in the counts each year, bringing the 2010 total to around 170 horses. The life span of horses on Cumberland Island is approximately half that of their ancestors, due to infestations of parasites and disease. They also suffer from digestive issues linked to the ingestion of a great amount of sand, which causes intestinal blockages and abdominal distension.

A study published in 2000 by researchers from the University of Georgia and the US Fish and Wildlife Service looked at data collected between 1986 and 1990 in an effort to better understand the herd dynamics of the Cumberland Island herd. The study found that band instability was high, with mares not generally forming close relationships with each other and commonly switching which stallion they banded with, and juveniles dispersing quickly. The researchers attributed this to a lack of territory, with bands frequently inhabiting overlapping areas, along with a high number of bachelor stallions (those without mares). They also saw a high number of co-dominant stallions, where two or more stallions would lead a band together, and alternate breeding of the band's mares. Foals born on Cumberland Island were less likely to survive than comparable foals in western feral herds, with survival rates of 58.8-61.1% and 80% respectively. This was found to be especially true in animals born after 1 June, which was attributed to higher temperatures, higher insect levels and reduced food availability. The number of horses in the Cumberland bands was comparable to western bands and those on some eastern islands. However, Assateague and Shackleford Banks horses tended to have larger bands, with an average of 8.1 and 12.3 horses per band, respectively.

== Controversy and management ==
An initial study published in 1988 by a researcher from Oak Ridge National Laboratory demonstrated the then-current population of 180 horses was over-grazing the island. The researcher recommended reducing the herd size to between 49 and 73 animals, which she contended was the maximum size that the island could support without environmental damage. The study showed that the horses were significantly reducing plant stocks on the island, and reducing future plant production due to trampling. A 1991 study of genetic variation in feral horse herds on eastern US barrier islands was conducted by researchers from the University of Georgia and University of Kentucky. The study concluded that a herd of 122 was the minimum size necessary to prevent inbreeding. The researchers noted that they were looking at herd size solely as it related to genetic variation, and did not take environmental damage into consideration. In addition, it was found that due to the large amount of introduced blood from outside horses, the Cumberland Island horses were not genetically unique. Due to this, and the ongoing environmental damage, it was concluded that the horses met neither the genetic nor the environmental requirements for feral horses on public lands and that the herd should be reduced or removed completely. The researchers conceded, however, that their analysis did not take "local historical and cultural elements" into consideration, only environmental and genetic.

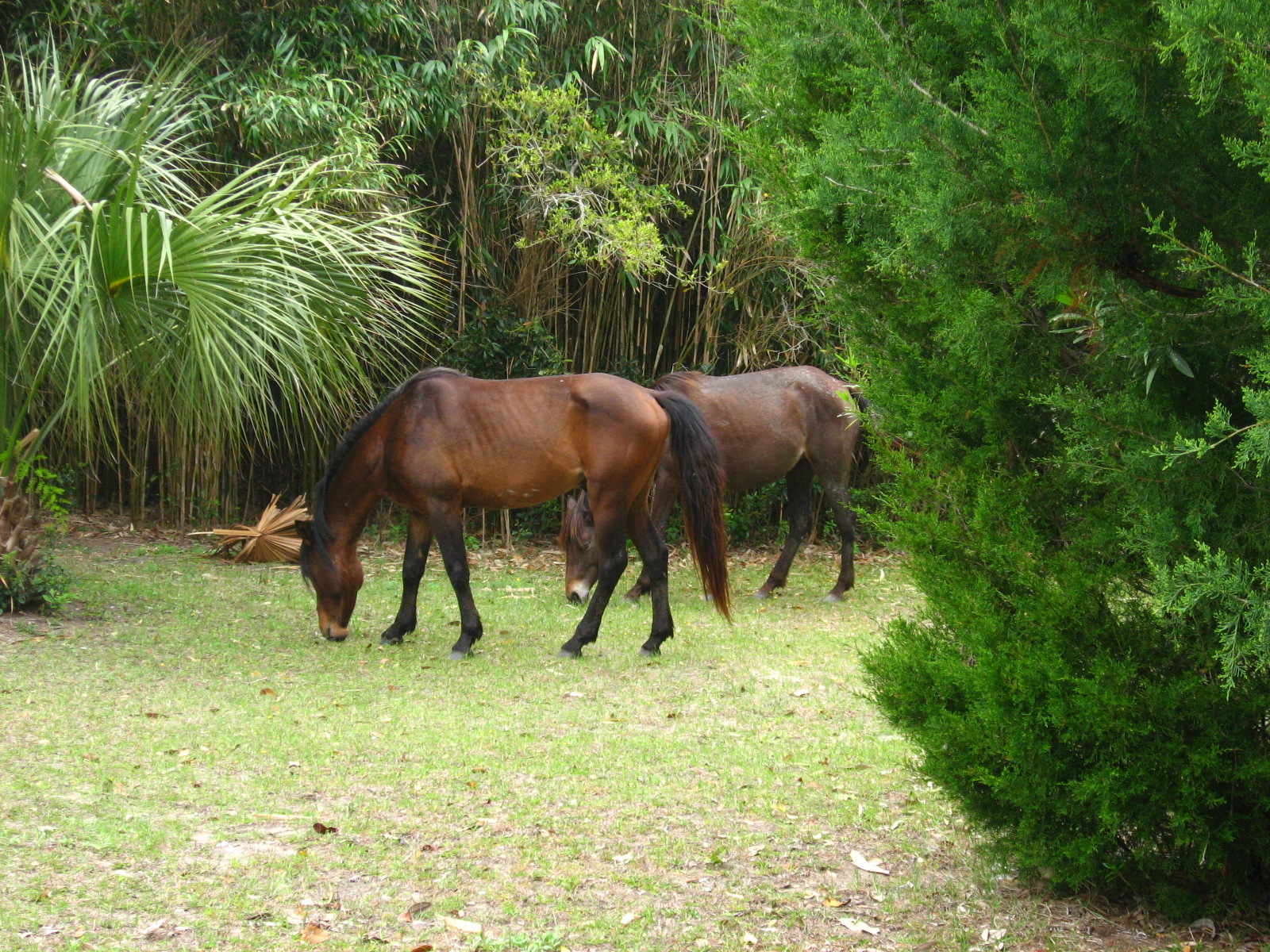
Cumberland horses among the vegetation on the island

In 1995, the NPS began the process of developing a management plan for the Cumberland Island horse. After compiling information, they released a draft environmental assessment in early 1996 and began taking public comment on a potential management plan. Public opinion was severely divided, with environmentalists approving of the management plan, which would have likely resulted in the reduction or removal of the herd, and animal rights activists and island residents protesting the plan. However, before a plan could be implemented, US Representative Jack Kingston included a provision in a federal appropriations bill that prevented any management of the horses. Kingston made the change to the bill after touring the island, but without consultation with the NPS. He initially claimed that he personally did not see significant damage to the island from the horses and that the herd size had decreased. However, upon later questioning, he refused to expand upon his observations of the damage to the island. The provision expired in 1997, but effectively halted momentum toward a park management plan. The study published in 2000 recommended a management strategy that reduced herd populations to environmentally-recommended sizes through a combination of off-island adoption to private owners and contraceptives. The researchers recommended that contraceptive use be focused on the female members of the herd, due to the high numbers of bachelor stallions.

In 2009, a study was conducted by the Warnell School of Forestry and Natural Resources at the University of Georgia to determine public opinion on the management of the feral livestock (horses and pigs) on the island. The researchers found that 68% of visitors believed the horses were damaging the habitat of the island, there was no consensus on a solution to the problem. The majority of visitors tended to prefer non-lethal methods of managing the population, as opposed to non-management or complete eradication. At that time, park management felt that although the horses were popular with tourists, they were also destructive to beach ecosystems, including an increase in erosion where horses had eaten grasses that previously held sand in place. The 2009 NPCA report emphasized the negative impact that the horses were having on the island environment, and endorsed study findings that between 50 and 70 animals would be an appropriate population for the island. However, the report also noted the management challenges resulting from the "public and political appeal for the animals", but stated that a management plan is necessary. Potential solutions offered by the NPCA included eradicating the herd, confining a reduced herd to a portion of the island, and using contraceptives to reduce herd numbers. As of April 2014, there was no management plan published by the NPS, which considers the herd "feral, free-ranging and unmanaged".

== See also ==
- Carolina Marsh Tacky
- Colonial Spanish Horse
- Florida Cracker Horse
- Banker horse
