= Scout (Scouting) =

Member of the Scouting movement

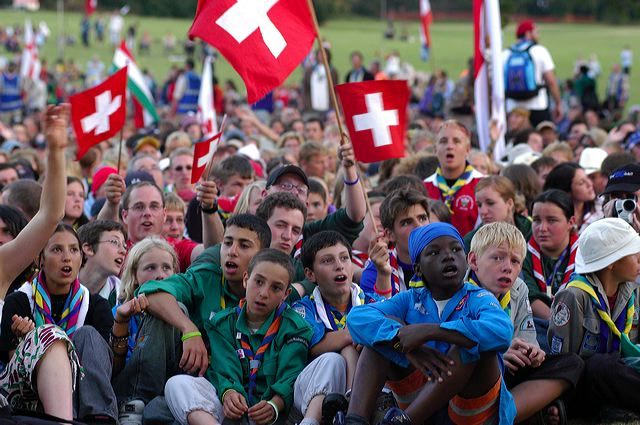
Scouts coming from various nations sing at the European Jamboree 2005.

A Scout, Boy Scout, Girl Scout, or, in some countries, a Pathfinder is a participant in the Scout Movement, usually aged 10–18 years, who engages in learning scoutcraft and outdoor and other special interest activities. Some Scout organizations have split this wide age group development span into junior and senior programs. Scouts are often organized into patrols of about 6–8 Scouts under a patrol leader with a number of patrols forming a larger troop under the guidance of one or more adult leaders or Scoutmasters. Many troops are affiliated with local, national and international organizations. Some Scout organizations have special interest programs such as Air Scouts, Sea Scouts, high adventure, Scout bands, mounted scouts and cyclist Scouts. In the United States there were around 6 million scouts in 2011.

== Foundation ==
At the beginning of the twentieth century, there was popular interest in frontier and military scouts. Boys and girls emulated these scouts in dress and activities and teachers and youth leaders instructed boys and girls in scoutcraft. Aids to Scouting, a book about military scouting written by a hero of the Second Boer War, Robert Baden-Powell, was one source used for instruction. Inspired by the interest in his book and urged by the founder and leaders of the Boys Brigade, Baden-Powell wrote Scouting for Boys for boy readership, which was published in 1908 together with The Scout magazine which describe a Scout method of outdoor activities aiming at developing character, citizenship training, and personal fitness qualities among youth. Baden-Powell intended his book and scheme would be used by established organizations, particular the various Brigade Movement organizations. However, because of the popular image of scouts and desire for adventurous outdoor activities, boys and even some girls formed their own Scout patrols independent of any organization.

Local and national scout organizations were formed in many countries. In the United Kingdom, Baden-Powell formed The Boy Scouts Association in 1910. Over time, Scout programs have been modified in many of the countries where it is run and special interest programs developed such as Air Scouts, Sea Scouts, outdoor high adventure, Scout bands and rider Scouts but most hold to the same core values and principles.

=== Girls ===
Many girls took up being Girl Scouts. Edwardian values of the time would not accept young boys and girls to "rough and tumble" together, so Baden-Powell formed a separate organization for girls in 1910, the Girl Guides Association, which was followed in other countries forming the Girl Guides.

=== Senior Scouts ===
Many Scout troops and central organizations found it useful to provide separate training for older boys as senior Scouts in separate patrols and troops. Later, programs for senior Scouts were formally established (e.g. Senior Scouts, Explorer Scouts, Venture Scouts), often with more challenging and diverse activities.

=== Other programs often associated with Scouts ===
The Scout scheme is aimed at 11 to 18 year-olds. Younger children, particularly younger siblings, attended some Scout meetings and so programs for younger children were developed by some troops and organizations. Baden-Powell's Boy Scouts Association launched its Wolf Cubs in 1916, which Baden-Powell wanted to be distinct from Scouts in name, uniform and identity to ensure they did not give Scouts a juvenile image. Similarly, some Scout organizations developed programs for those who had grown too old to be Scouts but wanted to remain associated with and support Scout Troops. Baden-Powell's Boy Scouts Association formed its Rovers in 1918 for young men and its Guild of Old Scouts.

== Activities ==
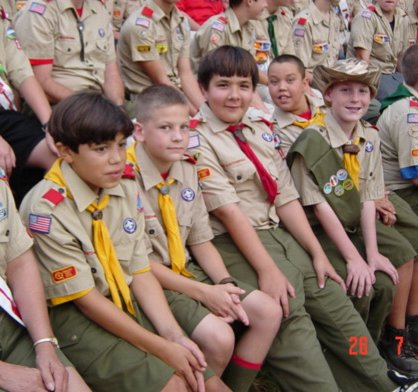
Scouts at a campfire ring at summer camp in 2002

A Scout learns the cornerstones of the Scout method, Scout Promise, and Scout Law. These are designed to instill character, citizenship, personal fitness, and leadership in boys through a structured program of outdoor activities. Common ways to implement the Scout method include spending time together in small groups with shared experiences, rituals, and activities, as well as emphasizing good citizenship and decision-making that are age-level appropriate. Cultivating a love and appreciation of the outdoors and outdoor activities are key elements. Primary activities include camping, woodcraft, first aid, aquatics, hiking, backpacking, and sports.

=== Fellowship ===
Camping most often occurs on a unit level, such as in the troop, but there are periodic camporees and jamborees. Camporees are events where units from a local area camp together for a weekend. These often occur a couple times a year and usually have a theme, such as pioneering. Jamborees are large events on a national or international level held every four years where thousands of Scouts camp together for one to two weeks. Activities at these events include games, Scoutcraft competitions, patch trading, aquatics, woodcarving, archery, and rifle and shotgun shooting.

For many Scouts, the highlight of the year is spending at least a week in the summer as part of an outdoor activity. This can be a long event such as camping, hiking, sailing, canoeing, or kayaking with the unit or a summer camp operated on a council, state, or provincial level. Scouts attending a summer camp, generally one week during the summer, work on merit badges, advancement, and perfecting Scoutcraft skills. Some summer camps operate specialty programs, such as sailing, backpacking, canoeing and whitewater, caving, and fishing.

=== Personal progression ===
A large part, compared to younger and older sections, of the activities are related to personal progression. All Scouting organizations have an advancement program, whereby the Scout learns Scoutcraft, community service, leadership, and explores areas of interest to him. This Badge system or Personal Progressive Scheme is based on two complementary elements:

- Proficiency (Merit) badges, which are intended to encourage the Scout to learn a subject which could be his work or hobby, so cover many different types of activities, not always related to Scouting.
- Class badges or Progress system, which symbolize increasingly difficult levels or successive stages.

Most Scouting associations have a highest badge that require mastering Scoutcraft, leadership, and performing community service. Only a small percentage of Scouts attain them.

== Unit affiliation ==
=== Troop ===
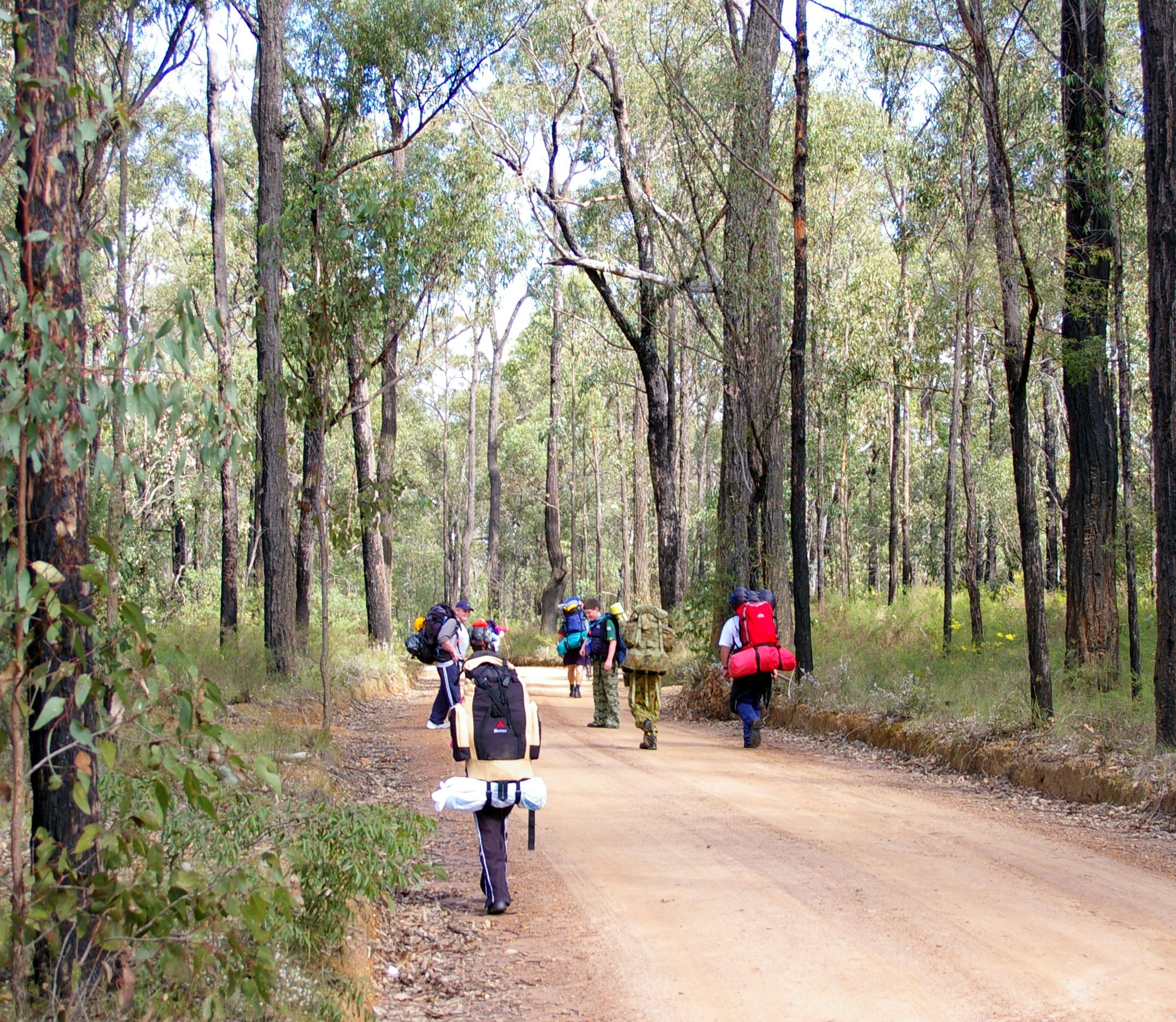
A group of Australian Scouts hike along a fire trail in a national park.

The troop is the fundamental unit of the Scouts. This is the group a Scout joins and via which he participates in Scouting activities, such as camping, backpacking, and canoeing. The troop leadership, youth and adult, organizes and provides support for these activities. It may include as few as a half-dozen Scouts, or as many as seventy or more. Troops usually meet weekly.

=== Patrol ===
Each troop is divided into patrols of around five to ten Scouts. A patrol's independence from the troop varies among troops and between activities. For instance, a troop typically holds ordinary meetings as a unit. Patrols' autonomy becomes more visible at campouts, where each patrol may set up its own area for cooking and camping. However, on a high adventure trip which only a small part of the troop attends, divisions between patrols may disappear entirely. Patrols may hold meetings and even excursions separately from the rest of the troop, but this is more common in some troops than in others. Each patrol has a Patrol Leader (PL) and Patrol Second (PS), or Assistant Patrol Leader (APL). Some troops mix older and younger Scouts in the same patrols so that the older Scouts can teach the younger ones more effectively, while other troops group Scouts by age so that the members of one patrol have more in common.

=== Group ===
In most countries a local organisation, a "Scout Group", combines different sections together into a single body. Scout Groups can consist of any number of sections of the different Age Groups in Scouting and Guiding. Scout Groups can be single sex or have boys and girls in separate and/or mixed-sex sections depending on the group and the national organization. In some countries, the different sections are independent of each other, although they might be sponsored or chartered by the same organisation, such as a church.

== Uniforms ==
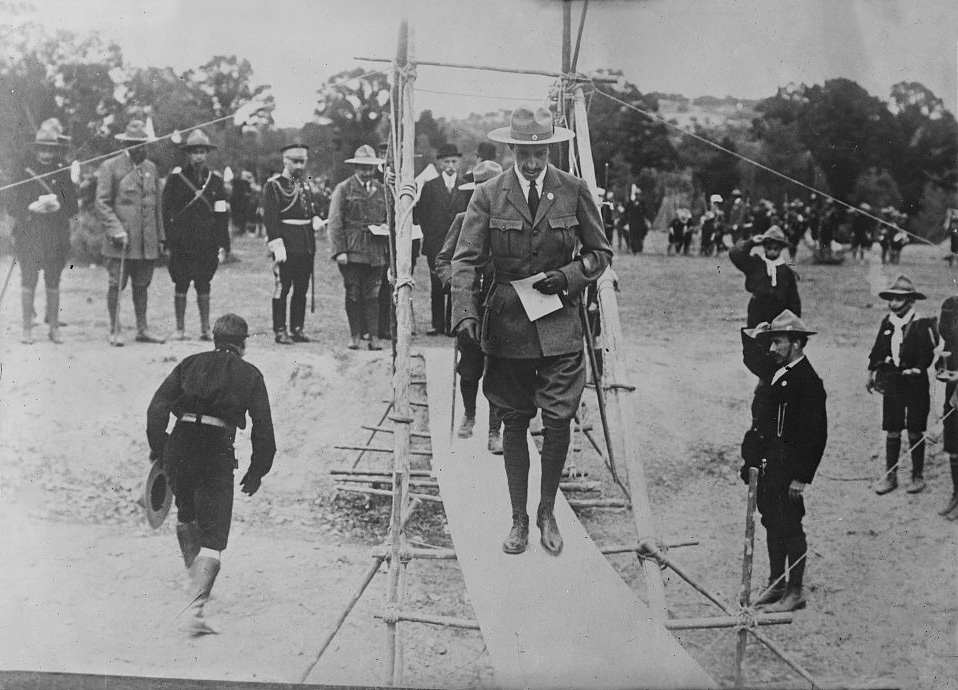
Alfonso XIII wearing a boy scout uniform, c. 1920

The Scout uniform is a specific characteristic of Scouting, and is worn at most events. The original uniform, which has created a familiar image in the public eye and had a very military appearance, consisted of a khaki button-up shirt, shorts, and a broad-brimmed campaign hat.

Uniforms have become much more functional and colorful since the beginning and are now frequently blue, orange, red, or green, and shorts are replaced by long trousers in areas where the culture calls for modesty, and in colder weather. T-shirts and other more casual wear have also replaced the more formal button-up uniforms in many Scouting regions. In some countries Scouts can display their various proficiency (merit) badges on their uniform, while in other countries they can display them on a green sash.

To show the unity of all Scouts, the World Membership Badge (World Crest) or another badge with a fleur-de-lis is a part of all uniforms. Neckerchiefs and Woggles (slides) are still quite common, but not all Scouting associations use them. Patches for leadership positions, ranks, special achievements, patrol- animals, colors or names, troop- or group- numbers or names, and country or regional affiliation are widely used.

== See also ==
- Girl Guide and Girl Scout
