= Mounted Boy Scout Troop 290 =

Mounted Boy Scout Troop 290 of Ocracoke, North Carolina, is one of the few mounted troops in the history of the Boy Scouts of America (BSA). The troop was founded by United States Army Lieutenant Colonel Marvin Howard in 1954 and was active for about 10 years. (Note: Sources conflict on the founding date. The March 1956 issue of Boys' Life says Troop 290 began "two summers ago", which would have been summer 1954. In a WRAL video interview, former members also state the troop was formed in 1954. A newspaper article in The Coastland Times from June 17, 1955 clearly indicates the Mounted Boy Scout Troop 290 had already been founded by that summer. Some sources state 1956, which is clearly in error.) They rode the feral Banker horses of North Carolina's Outer Banks. These horses were descended from horses that had either survived shipwrecks or early explorations from the 1500s–1700s along the Outer Banks. Though the ponies roamed free, they were considered livestock. In 1953, when the Cape Hatteras National Seashore was created, the Park Service banned free roaming livestock on the island. Efforts have been made to preserve the horses and improve their bloodline.

== History ==
=== Horses ===
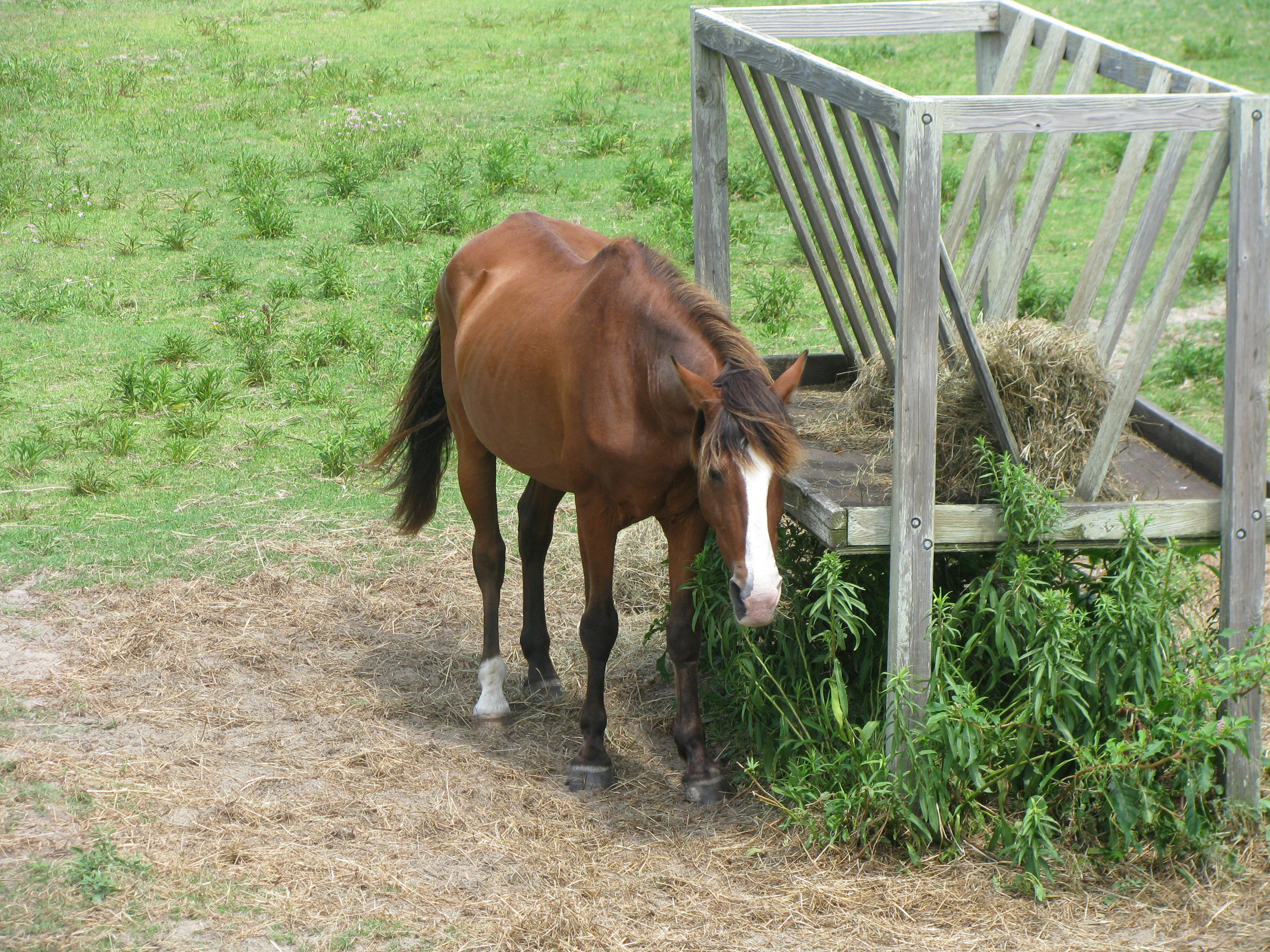
A banker horse on Ocracoke Island

The Banker horses were primarily descended from Spanish horses that had either survived shipwrecks or early explorations from the 1500s–1700s along the Outer Banks. The first horses on Ocracoke may have been from Sir Richard Grenville's ship, Tiger, which ran aground on Ocracoke in 1565. Solid documentation of the ponies on Ocracoke goes back to the 1730s. The Ocracoke ponies are different from other ponies in that they possess five instead of six lumbar vertebrae and 17 instead of 18 ribs. They also differ from standard horses in shape, color, size, posture, and weight.

Historically, though the ponies roamed free, they were owned by various members of the community and hence were considered livestock. This began to change in 1953 when the Cape Hatteras National Seashore was created and the Park Service banned free roaming livestock on the island.

=== Troop ===
The troop was founded by Army Lieutenant Colonel Marvin Howard, who had started his military career with the Navy in World War II before switching to the United States Army Corps of Engineers. This troop is the only mounted troop in the history of the BSA. In summer 1954, ten horses were taken from the Ocracoke herd as a project for Boy Scout Troop 290; and almost every age-eligible boy on the island joined the troop. The Scouts had to catch, tame, train, and teach the ponies to eat hay rather than native feed. Individual Scouts worked part-time to own their own pony, equipment, and horse feed. The horses, which were comfortable in the water, proved difficult to catch. The horses were taught to respond to "port" and "starboard" instead of "gee" and "haw". The Bankers were ridden in parades, especially on July 4, and used as mounts during programs to spray mosquito-ridden salt marshes. The troop made regular trips to the region's Pirates Jamboree and horse races in Buxton, North Carolina, as well as troop horseback hunting and camping trips.

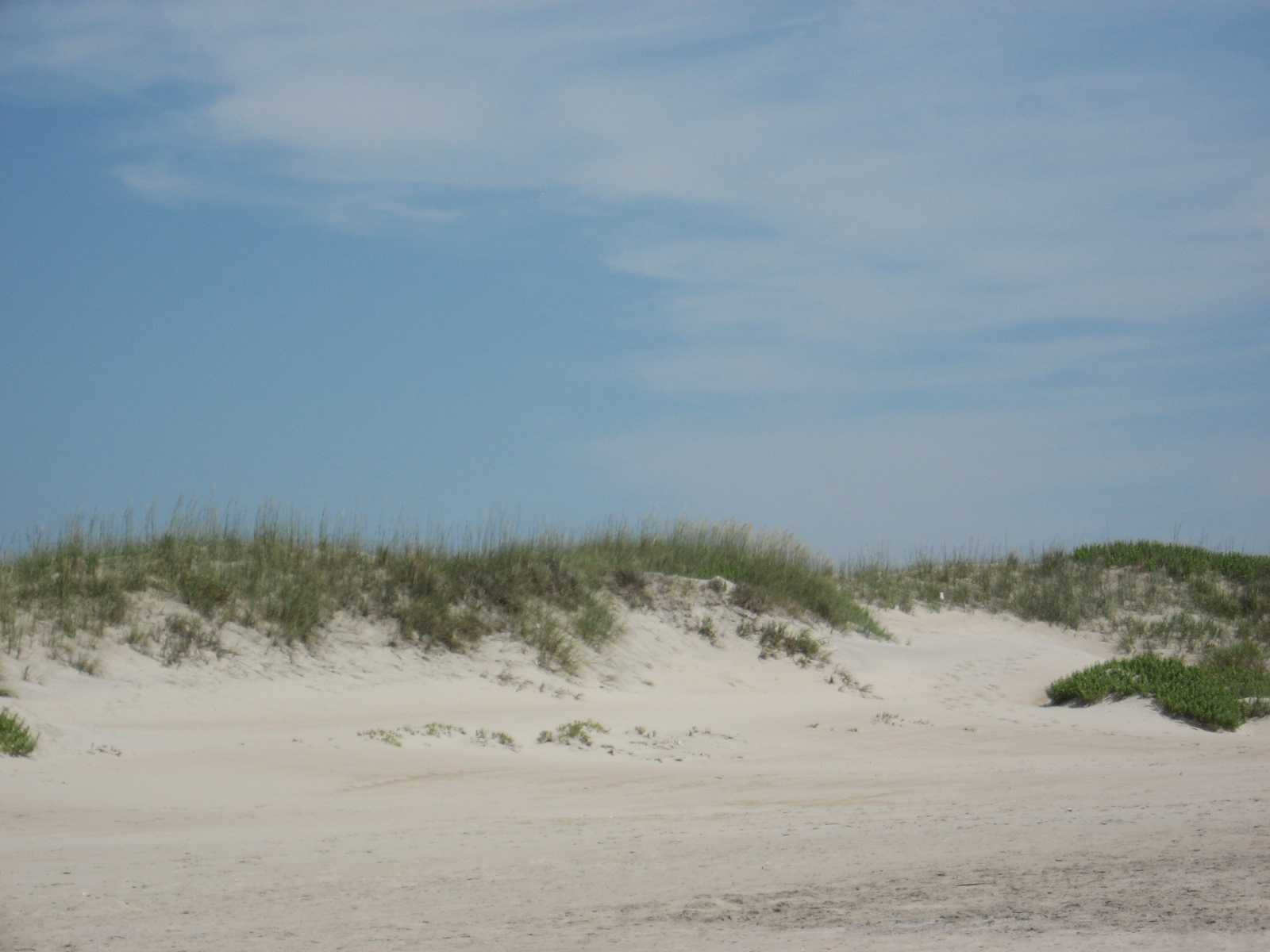
Sand dunes of Ocracoke

In 1959 the North Carolina legislature and the National Park Service ordered the ponies removed from all the Outer Banks islands because of overgrazing. However, the legislature and Park Service were persuaded to make an exception for the Scouts' ponies as long as they were penned and taught to eat hay. In the 1960s the National Park Service also began taking care of a small herd kept on 180 acres (73 ha) at the northern end of the island in pasture known as the Ocracoke Pony Pens. Then the BSA demanded that the Scouts buy insurance to continue riding the ponies, which they could not afford, and the troop folded about 10 years after it was formed. The pony pasture also became too expensive. When Troop 290 became defunct there were few ponies left. The Park Service took control of the ponies in the late 1960s.

=== Preservation ===
In 1973 Park Ranger Jim Henning and his wife Jeannette began efforts to save some of the horses at the north end of the island. The Ocracoke herd showed definite signs of an inadequate gene pool by the 1980s when in 1988 Susan Bratton of the Park Service recommended replenishing the herd's gene pool with other Banker horses. The herd shows genetic similarities to Standardbred horses.

Park Ranger Kenny Ballance had been the district ranger for 30 years when, on February 2, 2012, he brought Alonso, a two-year-old registered Spanish stallion with proven DNA links to the Ocracoke herd, from the Corolla Wild Horse herd of Corolla, North Carolina, to the Ocracoke herd to join 16 other horses to replenish their gene pool. This herd has respiratory and other problems believed to be caused by inbreeding. Alonso is believed to be the only healthy stallion that can continue the Ocracokes' blood line—and he has only one testicle with which to do it. It took Ballance three years to find a suitable stallion.
