= Florida Cracker Horse =

American horse breed

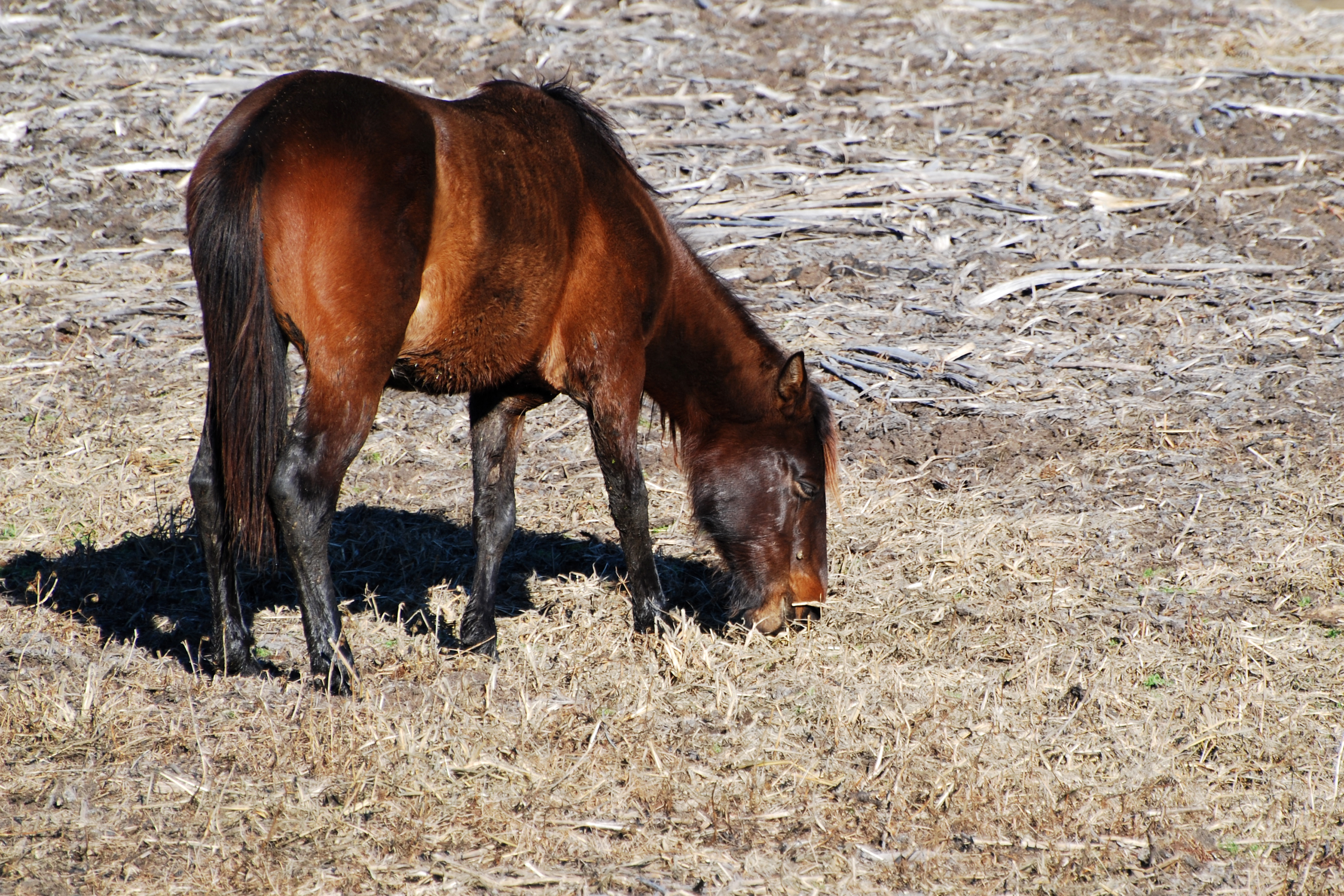
- Florida Cracker Horse in the Paynes Prairie State Preserve
- Other names: Chickasaw Pony, Seminole Pony, Prairie Pony, Florida Horse, Florida Cow Pony, Grass Gut
- Country of origin: United States

Traits
- Distinguishing features: Spanish-style gaited horse found in many colors

Breed standards
- Florida Cracker Horse Association

The Florida Cracker Horse is a critically endangered horse breed from the U.S. state of Florida. It is genetically and physically similar to many other Spanish-style horses, especially those from the Spanish Colonial horse group, including the Banker horse of North Carolina and the Carolina Marsh Tacky of South Carolina. The Florida Cracker Horse is a gaited breed known for its agility and speed.

The Spanish first brought horses to Florida with their expeditions in the early 16th century; as colonial settlement progressed, they used the horses for herding cattle. These horses developed into the Florida Cracker type seen today and continued to be used by Florida cattlemen (known as "Florida crackers" or "cowhunters") until the 1930s. By this point, the breed was superseded by American Quarter Horses which were needed to work the larger cattle breeds brought to Florida during the Dust Bowl. As a result, the population of the Florida Cracker Horse declined precipitously. Through the efforts of several private families and the Florida government, the breed was saved from extinction, but there is still concern about its low numbers. Both The Livestock Conservancy and the Equus Survival Trust consider the breed endangered.

On July 1, 2008, the Florida House of Representatives declared the Florida Cracker Horse the official state horse. The Florida Cracker is also associated with the Seminole Tribe of Florida, a prominent group of Native Americans in the state, as well as the Chickasaw Nation, a tribe that originally lived in Alabama and Mississippi in the Southern United States.

== Characteristics ==
The Florida Cracker Horse is also known by a variety of other names and descriptions, including "Chickasaw pony", "Seminole pony", "Prairie pony", "Florida horse", "Florida cow pony", and "grass-gut". The modern breed retains the size of its Spanish ancestors, standing 13.2 to 15 hands (54 to 60 inches, 137 to 152 cm) high and weighing 750 to 1,000 pounds (340 to 450 kg). They are found mainly in bay, black, and gray, although grullo, dun, and chestnut are also seen. Roan and pinto colors are occasionally found.

Florida Crackers have straight or slightly concave profiles, strong backs and sloping croups. They are known for their speed and agility and excel at trail and endurance riding, and are also used extensively as stock horses. They are sometimes seen in Western riding sports such as working cow horse, team roping, and team penning. The Florida Cracker is a gaited horse, with the breed association recognizing two gaits, the running walk and amble, in addition to the regular walk, trot, canter and gallop. The single-footed ambling gait is known as the "coon rack" by some breed enthusiasts.

The foundation genetics of the horse breed are the same as many others developed from Spanish stock in North and South America, including the Paso Fino, the Peruvian Paso, and the Criollo. The Florida Cracker Horse is very similar in type and genetics to the Carolina Marsh Tacky of South Carolina and the Banker horse of North Carolina, both Spanish-style breeds, but DNA testing has proven that these are separate breeds.

== History ==
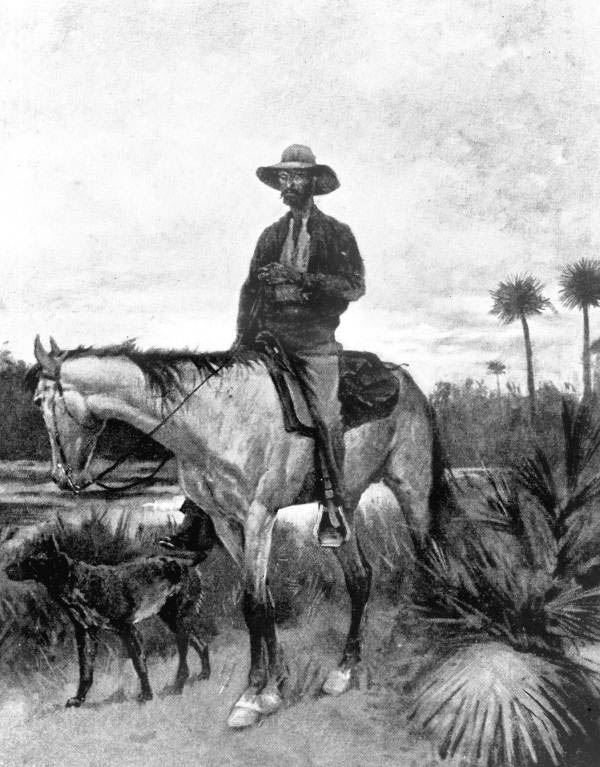
Drawing by Frederic Remington of the Floridian cattle herder Bone Mizell, 1895

Horses first arrived on the southeast North American mainland in 1521, brought by Ponce de León on his second trip to the region, where they were used by officers, scouts, and livestock herders. Later expeditions brought more horses and cattle to Spanish Florida. By the late 16th century horses were used extensively in the local cattle business, and by the late 17th century the industry was flourishing, especially in what is now northern Florida and southern Georgia. The horses included Barbs, Garranos, Spanish Jennets, Sorraias, Andalusians, and other Iberian breeds. Overall, they were relatively small and had physical traits distinctive of Spanish breeds, including short backs, sloping shoulders, low set tails, and wide foreheads.

The early cattle drivers, nicknamed Florida crackers and Georgia crackers, used these Spanish-ancestry horses to drive cattle (eventually known as Florida Cracker cattle). The cattlemen were said to have received their nickname from the distinctive cracking of their whips, though modern etymology actually traces the term to a mostly obsolete word for 'braggart' or 'loudmouth'. The name was transferred to both the horses they rode and the cattle they herded. Through their primary use as stock horses, the type developed into the Florida Cracker Horse, known for its speed, endurance and agility. From the mid-16th century to the 1930s, this type was the predominant horse in the southeastern United States.

During the American Civil War (1861–1865), both belligerents purchased large amounts of beef from Florida, and the Spanish horses bred there were highly desired as riding horses. During this time, there was also a continual introduction of new Spanish blood from Cuba, as horses were traded between the two areas. During the Dust Bowl (1930–1940), large western cattle were moved into Florida, bringing with them the parasitic screwworm. Cattle with this parasite needed to be treated frequently, being roped and held while the rider was on horseback. The cowboys found that the Florida Cracker Horses, bred for working smaller cattle, were not able to hold the western cattle. They replaced the smaller horses with American Quarter Horses. This resulted in the Florida breed almost becoming extinct.

=== 20th century ===
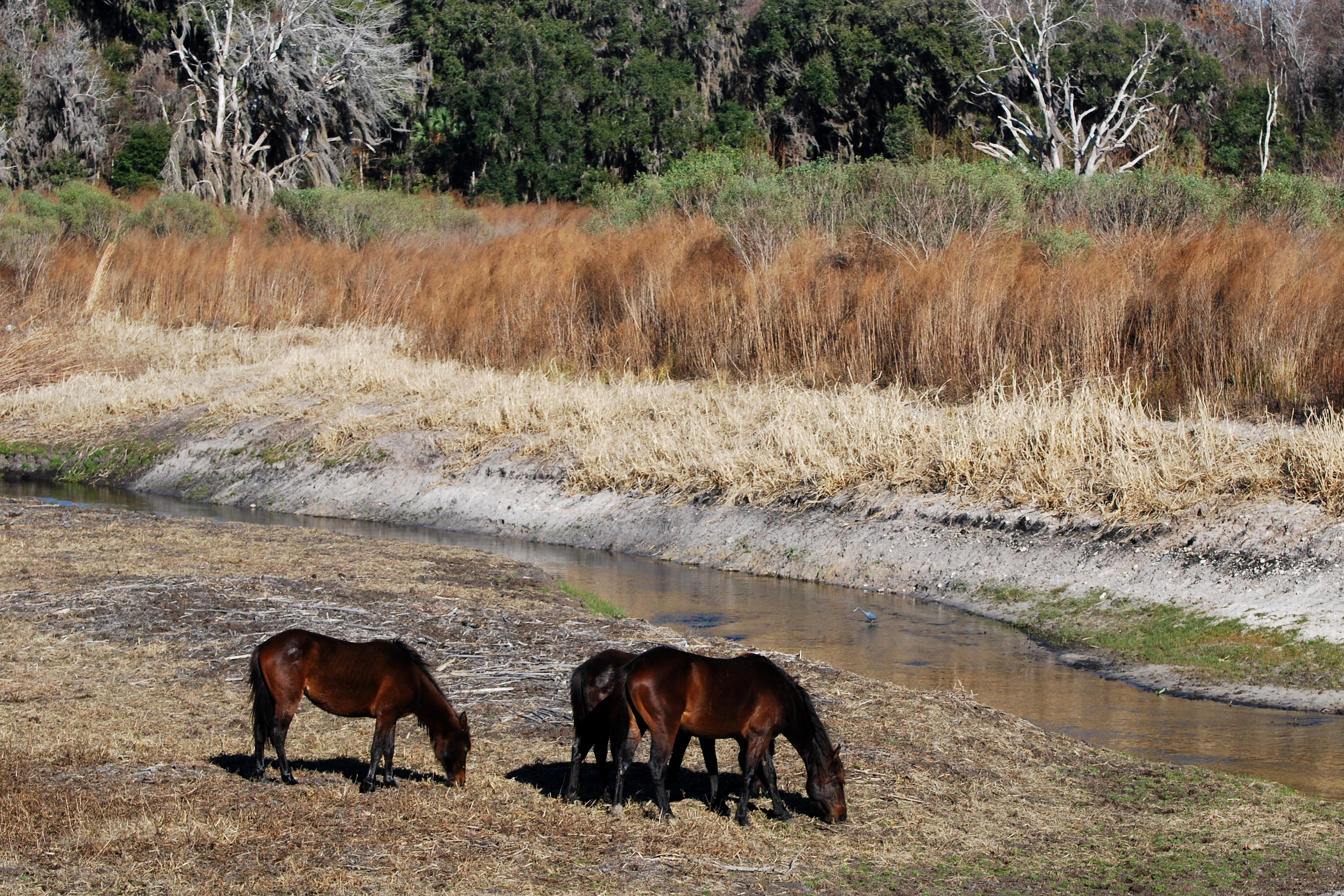
Group of three Florida Cracker Horses in the Paynes Prairie State Preserve

The breed's survival during the 20th century is owed to a few families who continued to breed the horse and kept distinct bloodlines alive. John Law Ayers was one such breeder; in 1984, he donated his herd of pure-bred horses to the state of Florida. With them, the state started three small herds in Tallahassee, Withlacoochee State Forest, and Paynes Prairie State Preserve. By 1989, however, these three herds and around 100 other horses owned by private families were all that remained of the breed. In 1989 the Florida Cracker Horse Association was founded, and in 1991 a registry was established. After the registry was created, 75 horses designated as "foundation horses" and 14 of their offspring were immediately registered. These horses came mainly from four lines of Cracker bloodstock and were designated as purebreds by breed experts – partbred horses were denied entry to the registry. As of 2009, around 900 horses had been registered since the foundation of the registry.

Effective July 1, 2008, the Florida House of Representatives declared the Florida Cracker Horse the official state horse. As of 2009 there are three main bloodlines of Cracker stock, as well as a few smaller lines. The state of Florida still maintains two groups of Ayers-line horses in Tallahassee and Withlacoochee for breeding purposes and a display group in the Paynes Prairie Preserve. The state annually sells excess horses from all three herds, and individual breeders also send horses to the sale. The Livestock Conservancy considers the breed to be at "critical" status, meaning that the estimated global population of the breed is fewer than 2,000 and there are fewer than 200 registrations annually in the United States. The Equus Survival Trust also considers the population to be "critical," meaning that there are between 100 and 300 active breeding mares in existence today. However, breed numbers are slowly on the rise.

=== Chickasaw horse ===
The original Chickasaw horse, bred by the Chickasaw Nation using horses captured from Hernando de Soto's expedition, became extinct after being used to create the Florida Cracker Horse, and having some influence on the American Quarter Horse. Some sources still use the Chickasaw name to describe the Florida Crackers of today. The Chickasaw horse was originally bred for speed over short distances, traits found in its Florida Cracker Horse and American Quarter Horse descendants. The typical Chickasaw horse stood at about 13 hands high, described as "short and chunky, quick to action, but not distance runners...the best utility and all-rounder horses of their time". They influenced the Banker horse, the Carolina Marsh Tacky, and the Chincoteague Pony.

In the 1970s, there was interest in re-creating the Chickasaw horse using horses bearing strong resemblances to the original breed, but the breed association no longer exists. The Chickasaw Horse Association Inc. listed the conformation of the Chickasaw horse as "a short head, short fine ears, wide between the eyes, short back, square blocky hips, dock set low, short neck, wide chest, high deep shoulders, strong short pasterns, and a slight bend in the hock".

== See also ==
- Agriculture in Florida
