= Equestrian Scouting and Guiding =

Mounted Scouts or Equestrian Scouts are Scouts who specialize in horse riding. Such programs are available in the Netherlands, Sri Lanka, and the United States.

== The Netherlands ==
There are three groups in the Netherlands with Equestrian Scouts, namely Ruitergidsen Anne de Guigné in Arnhem, Scouting Vught in Vught Noord and Scouting Manresa in Venlo. The group in Vught has two special equestrian sections, namely "Ruitergidsen" (Rider Guides) and "Ruitersherpa" (Rider Senior Guides); the group in Venlo has one equestrian section, "Ruiterscouts" (7 to 14 years); the group in Arnhem is in its entirety equestrian Scouting-dedicated. The equestrian sections unofficially use a black uniform blouse. The equestrian sections are mixed but most of its members are girls.

One of the activities of the HIT, a yearly national event of Scouting Nederland during the Easter weekend, is an equestrian camp.

== Sri Lanka ==
The Sri Lanka Scout Association was the first organization to introduce, in collaboration with the Sri Lanka Equestrian Association (SLEA), Equestrian Scouting to the Scouting agenda in the Asia Pacific Region. Even though the equestrian proficiency badge has been included among the five essential badges a Scout must obtain to be subjected for the Scouts Awards, the activity has been set aside for the past few decades due to lack of facilities in the country. It was re-initiated in 2010 with the assistance of Premadasa Riding School.

=== Equestrian Scout Training Centers ===
- Premadasa Riding School - Nugegoda
- Victoria Saddle Camp Equestrian Scout Training Center - Kandy
- Equestrian Scout Training Center - Nuwara Eliya
- Equestrian Scout Training Center - Hambanthota
- Equestrian Scout Training Center - Galle

== United States ==
The Boy Scouts of America has a Horsemanship merit badge. The Girl Scouts of the USA have "Horse Fan" and "Horse Rider" badges.

== See also ==
- Mounted Boy Scout Troop 290, the only mounted troop in the history of the Boy Scouts of America (BSA)
