= Carolina Marsh Tacky =

American horse breed

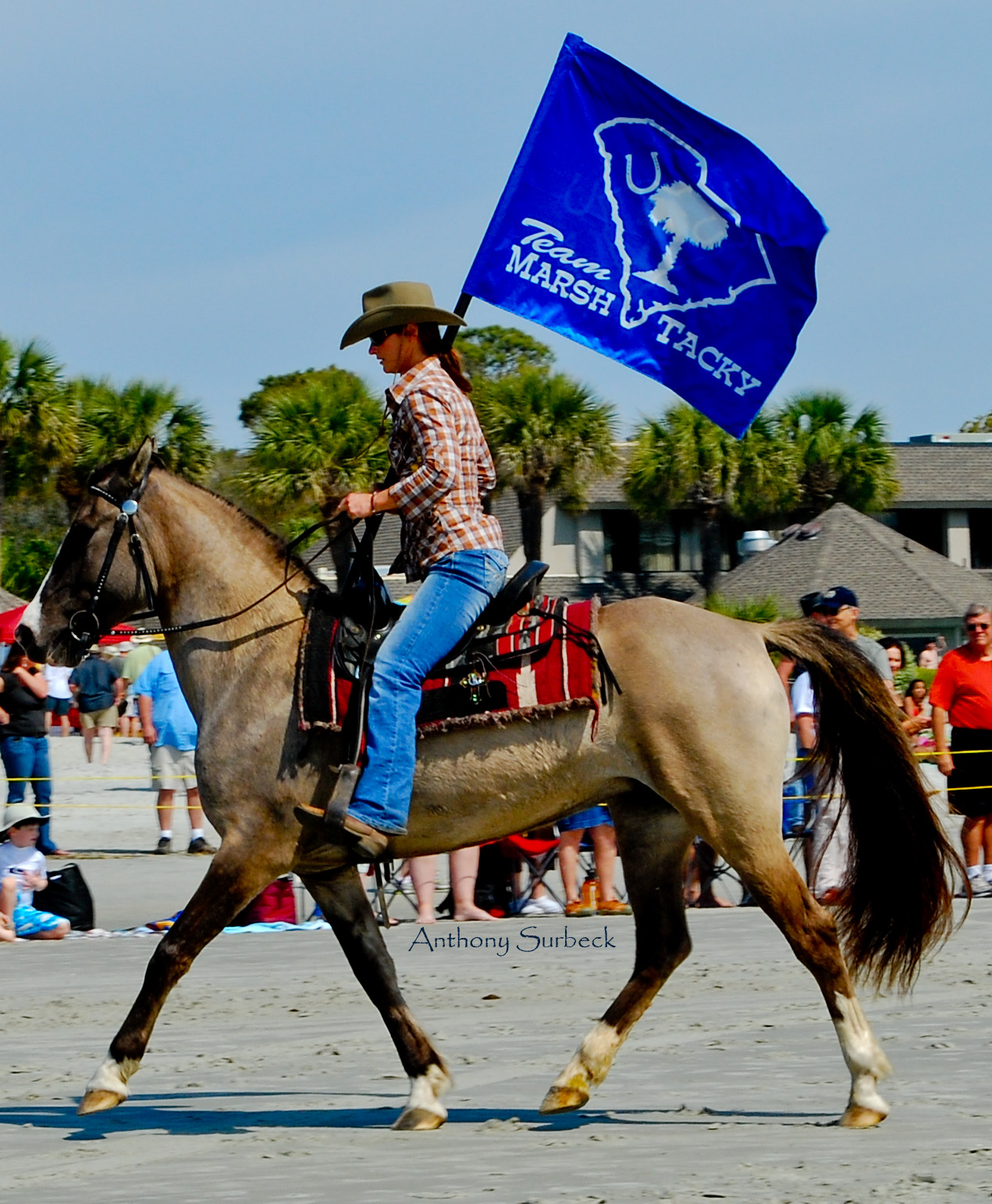
- Carolina Marsh Tacky at Hilton Head
- Other names: Marsh Tacky
- Country of origin: United States

Traits
- Distinguishing features: Small, sure-footed horse with gentle disposition, adept at work in marshland.

Breed standards
- Carolina Marsh Tacky Association

The Carolina Marsh Tacky or Marsh Tacky is a critically endangered breed of horse, native to South Carolina. It is a member of the Colonial Spanish group of horse breeds, which also include the Florida Cracker Horse and the Banker horse of North Carolina. It is a small horse, well-adapted for use in the lowland swamps of its native South Carolina. The Marsh Tacky developed from Spanish horses brought to the South Carolina coast by Spanish explorers, settlers and traders as early as the 16th century. The horses were used by the colonists during the American Revolution, and by settlers for farm work, herding cattle and hunting throughout the breed's history.

The breed is considered to be critically endangered by both the Livestock Conservancy and the Equus Survival Trust, and there are only around 400 Marsh Tackies in existence today. In 2006 and 2007, the two organizations worked together to complete DNA testing on the breed, with the goals of mapping the Marsh Tacky's place among other horse breeds, and starting a stud book. In 2007, an association was begun with the objective of preserving and promoting the Marsh Tacky; and in 2010, a closed stud book was created.

On June 11, 2010, a bill was signed into law that made the Carolina Marsh Tacky the official state horse of South Carolina.

== Characteristics ==
The Marsh Tacky generally stands between 14 and 14.2 hands (56 and 58 inches, 142 and 147 cm) high, although the acceptable range is between 13 and 15 hands (52 and 60 inches, 132 and 152 cm) high. Today, the breed comes in a wide variety of colors, including dun, bay, roan, chestnut, black and grullo. Historically, multi-colored patterns such as pinto were found, but they were not selected for when breeding, and today are not seen. The colors today are consistent with those of other Colonial Spanish horses. The profile of the breed's head is usually flat or somewhat concave, becoming slightly convex from the nasal region to the top of the muzzle. The forehead is wide and the eyes set well apart. The breed typically has a slight ewe neck, and the neck is attached low on the chest compared to many other breeds. The withers are pronounced, the back short and strong, and the croup steeply angled. The chest is deep but narrow and the shoulder long and angled. The legs have long, tapering muscling, with in general no feathering on the lower legs. The Marsh Tacky exhibits a four-beat ambling gait, most similar to the marcha batida of the Brazilian Mangalarga Marchador, another breed with Spanish heritage, although also compared to the fox trot of the Missouri Fox Trotter. However, the Marsh Tacky's gait shows a period of quadrupedal support where all four feet are planted and diagonal foot pairings, whereas the Fox Trotter shows tripedal support and the Mangalarga Marchador lacks the diagonal foot pairings.

The Marsh Tacky is known by owners for its stamina and ability to work in water and swamps without panicking. They tend to be sure-footed, sturdy, smart, and able to survive in challenging coastal environments, as well as being easy keepers. Their small size and gentle nature made them the historically preferred mount for children and women, but they were also used as working animals due to their abilities in the field. Today, they are used in endurance riding, as well as continuing their traditional work assisting humans with hunting wild game and herding cattle.

Marsh Tackies have the same ancestral bloodlines as Florida Cracker Horses and North Carolina Banker horses. However, DNA testing has proved that the Marsh Tackies' relative isolation has made them a separate breed with unique characteristics.

== History ==
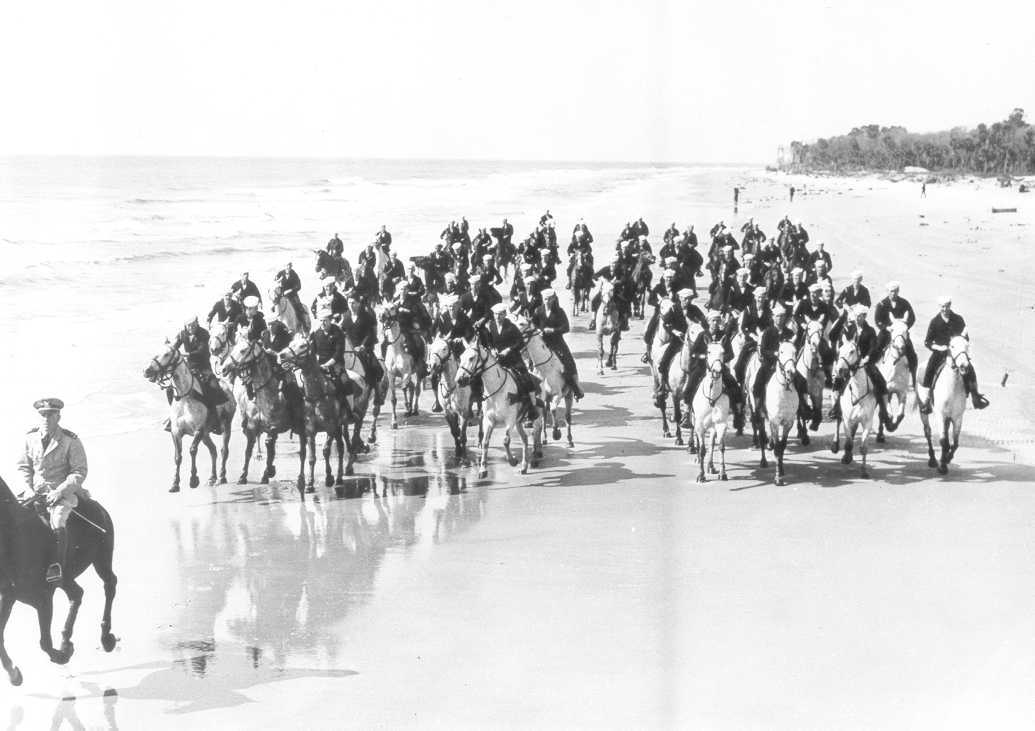
A mounted beach patrol on Hilton Head Island during World War II

The Carolina Marsh Tacky developed from Spanish horses brought to the island and coastal areas of South Carolina by Spanish explorers and settlers as early as the 16th century. More horses were added to the population that would become the Marsh Tacky through animals that were purchased in the Spanish settlement of St. Augustine in Florida. They were then used as pack horses on Native American trade routes, and sold when the traders reached Charleston. They were managed mainly as feral herds, rounded up by locals when horses were needed, and this tradition continued into the 20th century. These horses were the most common breed in their area of the country for most of their history. The breed derives the "tacky" part of its name from an archaic English word meaning a low-quality or neglected horse, and was later applied to low-status white people, with a similar connotation to cracker or hillbilly. (In contemporary English usage, the term is used as an adjective to describe things that are viewed as shabby or in poor taste.)

The breed was used during the American Revolution by many of the irregular forces of Francis Marion, nicknamed the "Swamp Fox". The swamp savvy of the Marsh Tacky may have given Marion's forces an advantage, as British cavalry mounted on larger European breeds were not as easily able to maneuver in the dense lowland swamps. After the American Civil War, they were commonly used by members of the Gullah community on the islands off the South Carolina shore for use in fields and gardens. During the height of their popularity they ranged from Myrtle Beach, South Carolina to St. Simon's Island in Georgia. The Tackies continued to be used during World War II by members of the beach patrols tasked with the surveillance of South Carolina beaches against Nazi U-boat attacks and enemy troop or spy landings. During the 1960s, Marsh Tackies were used in races on Hilton Head beaches. This tradition was revived in 2009 during the Gullah Cultural Festival, and the races will be continued at the festival in future years.

In 2007, the Carolina Marsh Tacky Association was formed. The association was developed through the efforts of the American Livestock Breeds Conservancy working with owners and breed enthusiasts, with the goal of preserving and promoting the Marsh Tacky breed. The breed registry became a closed registry on August 18, 2010, and is maintained by the American Livestock Breeds Conservancy Pedigree Registry. Although closed, outside horses can be registered upon proof of origin, visual inspection and DNA confirmation of parentage.

In 2015, a complete, articulated horse skeleton believed to be a Marsh Tacky was unearthed at an archaeological dig in St. Augustine, Florida. The approximately 200-year-old skeleton was found on the site which once housed the Spanish Dragoon Barracks.

== Conservation ==
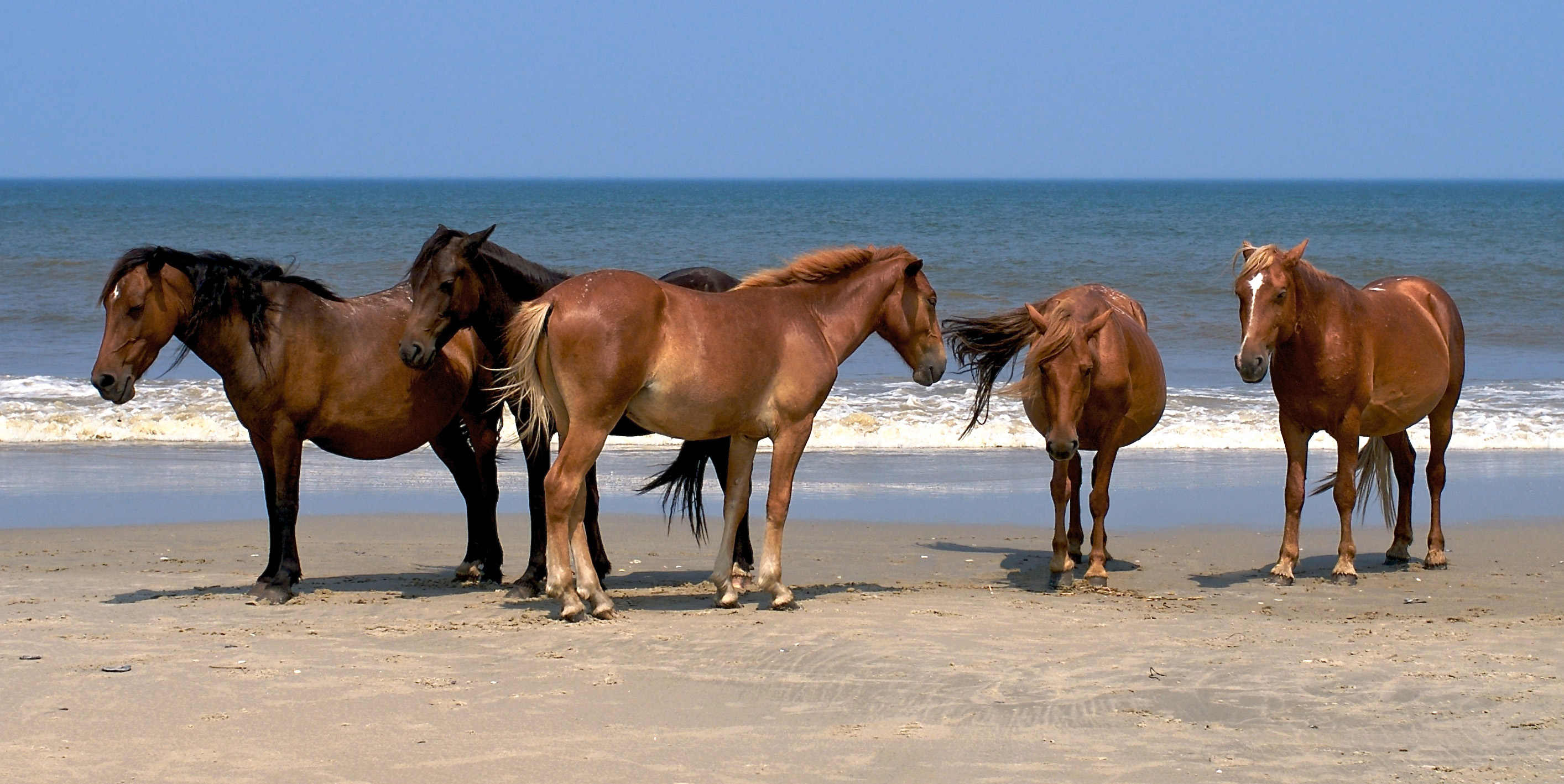
North Carolina Banker horses, a breed with a similar history to the Marsh Tacky.

In the lowcountry region of coastal Georgia and South Carolina, the Carolina Marsh Tacky was the most common horse for most of the breed's history. As the automobile became more common during the 20th century, breed numbers declined, and the Marsh Tacky was thought to have gone extinct during the 1980s and 1990s. In 2012 there were 276 living animals registered, 153 mares and 123 stallions and geldings.

In 2024, the Equus Survival Trust considered the breed to be at a critical level, meaning that there are 100–600 breeding mares. The American Livestock Breeds Conservancy considers the Marsh Tacky (which they consider a strain of the Colonial Spanish horse) to be at critical levels, meaning that there are fewer than 200 annual registrations in the United States and an estimated global population of less than 2,000. Representatives of the ALBC state that the breed numbers will have to increase to an estimated 1,000 members to ensure permanent survival.

On June 11, 2010, a bill was signed into law that made the Carolina Marsh Tacky the official state horse of South Carolina. At the same time, the North Carolina General Assembly declared the Banker horse ("Colonial Spanish Mustang") to be the official state horse of North Carolina. This was part of a joint effort by both Carolinas to save both critically endangered horse breeds from extinction.

In 2006, the ALBC began investigating the Marsh Tacky to see if it was truly a descendant of Spanish stock, and during the organization's initial field investigations it was found that many surviving members of the breed fit the physical type of Colonial Spanish stock. In 2007, the American Livestock Breeds Conservancy collaborated with the Equus Survival Trust to collect DNA samples and photo-document the largest herd in South Carolina, considered to be the largest remaining herd, with a heritage tracing back to the American Civil War. DNA testing was undertaken in an effort to identify horses for a new studbook, reveal what DNA markers the breed carries, and map the breed's genetic place among all other horse breeds worldwide. Sixty horses were tested in the effort.

== See also ==
- The Livestock Conservancy
- Przewalski's horse
- Canadian horse
- Akhal-Teke
