= Banker horse =

Breed of feral horse living on barrier islands in North Carolina's Outer Banks

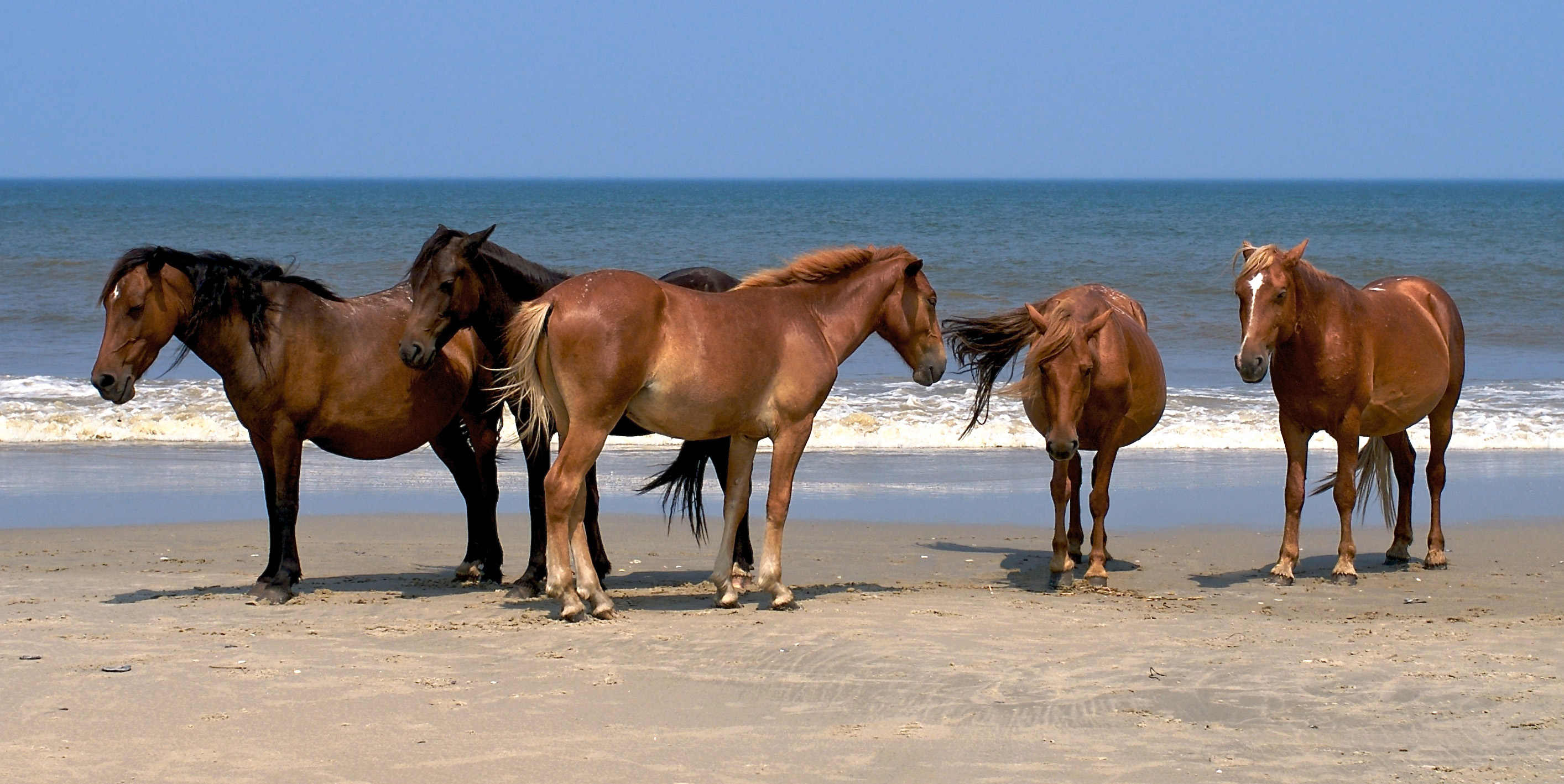
- Horses near Corolla
- Country of origin: United States

Traits
- Distinguishing features: Small, compact conformation

The Banker horse is a breed of feral horse (Equus ferus caballus) living on barrier islands in North Carolina's Outer Banks. It is small, hardy, and has a docile temperament. Descended from domesticated Spanish horses and possibly brought to the Americas in the 16th century, the ancestral foundation bloodstock may have become feral after surviving shipwrecks or being abandoned on the islands by one of the exploratory expeditions led by Lucas Vázquez de Ayllón or Sir Richard Grenville. Populations are found on Ocracoke Island, Shackleford Banks, Currituck Banks, Cedar Island, and in the Rachel Carson Estuarine Sanctuary.

Bankers are allowed to remain on the islands due to their historical significance even though they can trample plants and ground-nesting animals and are not considered to be indigenous. They survive by grazing on marsh grasses, which supply them with water as well as food, supplemented by temporary freshwater pools.

To prevent overpopulation and inbreeding, and to protect their habitat from being overgrazed, the horses are managed by the National Park Service, the state of North Carolina, and several private organizations. The horses are monitored for diseases, such as equine infectious anemia, an outbreak of which was discovered and subsequently eliminated on Shackleford in 1996. They are safeguarded from traffic on North Carolina Highway 12. Island populations are limited by adoptions and by birth control. Bankers taken from the wild and trained have been used for trail riding, driving, and occasionally for mounted patrols.

== Characteristics ==
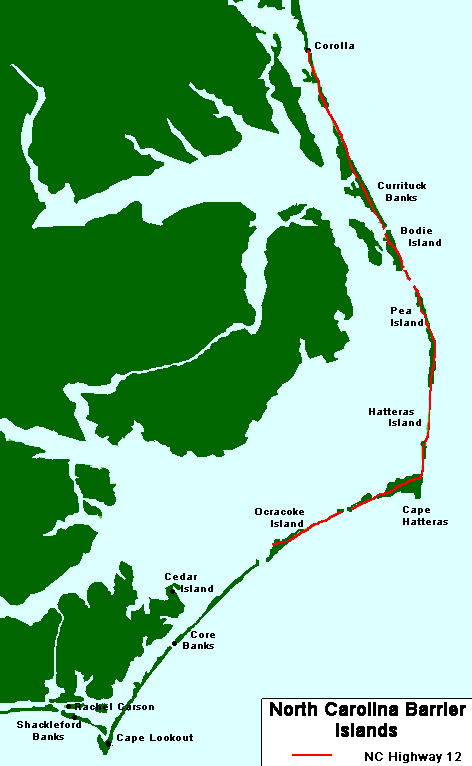
A map showing herd locations

The typical Banker is relatively small, standing between 13.0 and 14.3 hands (52 and 59 inches, 132 and 150 cm) high at the withers and weighing 800 to 1,000 pounds (360 to 450 kg). The forehead is broad and the facial profile tends to be straight or slightly convex. The chest is deep and narrow and the back is short with a sloped croup and low-set tail. Legs have an oval-shaped cannon bone, a trait considered indicative of "strong bone" or soundness. Callouses known as chestnuts are small, on some so tiny that they are barely detectable. Most Bankers have no chestnuts on the hind legs. The coat can be any color but is most often brown, bay, dun, or chestnut. Bankers have long-strided gaits and many are able to pace and amble. They are easy keepers and are hardy, friendly, and docile.

Several of the Bankers' characteristics indicate that they share ancestry with other Colonial Spanish horse breeds. The presence of the genetic marker "Q-ac" suggests that the horses share common ancestry with two other breeds of Spanish descent, the Pryor Mountain Mustang and Paso Fino. These breeds diverged from one another 400 years ago. The breed shares skeletal traits of other Colonial Spanish horses: the wings of the atlas are lobed, rather than semicircular; and they are short-backed, with some individuals possessing five instead of six lumbar vertebrae. No changes in function result from these spinal differences. The convex facial profile common to the breed also indicates Spanish ancestry.

== Breed history ==
Since they are free-roaming, Bankers are often referred to as "wild" horses; however, because they descend from domesticated ancestors, they are feral horses. It is thought that the Bankers arrived on the barrier islands during the 16th century. Several hypotheses have been advanced to explain the horses' origins, but none have yet been fully verified.

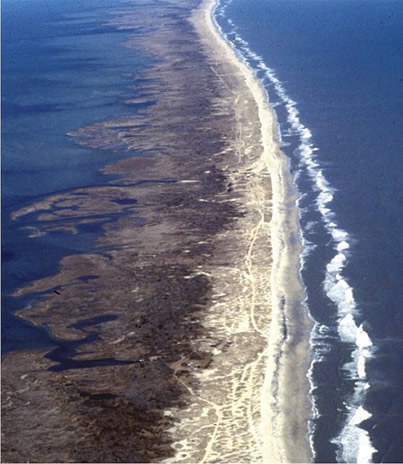
Aerial view of a barrier island in the North Carolina Outer Banks

One theory is that ancestors of the Banker swam ashore from wrecked Spanish galleons. Ships returning to Spain from the Americas often took advantage of both the Gulf Stream and continental trade winds, on a route that brought them within 20 miles (32 km) of the Outer Banks. Hidden shoals claimed many victims, and earned this region the name of "Graveyard of the Atlantic". At least eight shipwrecks discovered in the area are of Spanish origin, dating between 1528 and 1564. These ships sank close enough to land for the horses to have made the shores. Alternatively, during hazardous weather, ships may have taken refuge close to shore, where the horses may have been turned loose. However, the presence of horses on Spanish treasure ships has not been confirmed—cargo space was primarily intended for transporting riches such as gold and silver.

Another conjecture is that the breed is descended from the 89 horses brought to the islands in 1526 by Spanish explorer Lucas Vázquez de Ayllón. His attempted colonization of San Miguel de Gualdape (near the Santee River in South Carolina) failed, forcing the colonists to move, possibly to North Carolina. Vázquez de Ayllón and about 450 of the original 600 colonists subsequently died as a result of desertion, disease, and an early frost. Lacking effective leadership, the new settlement lasted for only two months; the survivors abandoned the colony and fled to Hispaniola, leaving their horses behind.

A similar theory is that Sir Richard Grenville brought horses to the islands in 1585 during an attempt to establish an English naval base. All five of the expedition's vessels ran aground at Wococon (present-day Ocracoke). Documents indicate that the ships carried various types of livestock obtained through trade in Hispaniola, including "mares, kyne [cattle], buls, goates, swine [and] sheep." While the smaller vessels were easily refloated, one of Grenville's larger ships, the Tiger, was nearly destroyed. Scholars believe that as the crew attempted to lighten the ship, they either unloaded the horses or forced them overboard, letting them swim to shore. In a letter to Sir Francis Walsingham that same year, Grenville suggested that livestock survived on the island after the grounding of his ships.

== Life on the barrier islands ==
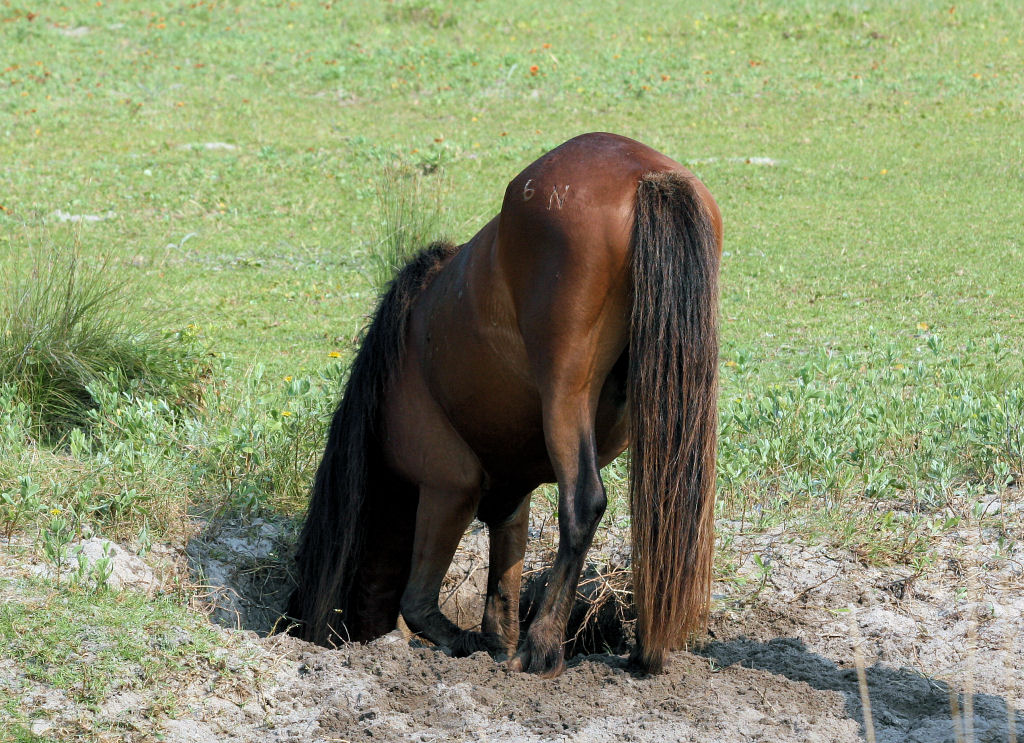
Drinking from a horse-dug water hole on Shackleford Banks

About 400 Bankers inhabit the long, narrow barrier islands of North Carolina's Outer Banks. These islands are offshore sediment deposits separated from the mainland by a body of water such as an estuary or sound. The islands can be up to 30 miles (48 km) from the shore; most are less than one mile (1.6 km) wide. Vegetation is sparse and consists mainly of coarse grasses and a few stunted trees. Each island in the chain is separated from the next by a tidal inlet.

The Bankers' small stature can be attributed, in part, to limited nutrients in their diet. They graze mostly on Spartina grasses but will feed on other plants such as bulrush (Typha latifolia), sea oats, and even poison ivy. Horses living closer to human habitation, such as those on Currituck Banks, have sometimes grazed on residential lawns and landscaping. Domesticated Bankers raised on manufactured horse feed from an early age tend to exhibit slightly larger frames.

Fresh water is a limiting resource for Bankers, as the islands are surrounded by salt water and have no freshwater springs or permanent ponds. The horses are dependent on ephemeral pools of rainwater and moisture in the vegetation they consume. Bankers will dig shallow holes, ranging from 2.5 to 4 feet (0.76 to 1.22 m) in depth, to reach fresh groundwater. Occasionally, they may resort to drinking seawater. This gives them a bloated appearance, a consequence of water retention caused by the body's effort to maintain osmotic balance.

== Land use controversies ==
The National Park Service (NPS) is concerned about the impact of Bankers on the environmental health of North Carolina's barrier islands. Initially, the NPS believed that the non-native Bankers would completely consume the Spartina alterniflora grasses and the maritime forests, as both were thought to be essential to their survival. Research in 1987 provided information on the horses' diet that suggested otherwise. Half of their diet consisted of Spartina, while only 4% of their nutrients came from the maritime forest. The study concluded that sufficient nutrients were replenished with each ocean tide to prevent a decline in vegetative growth from overgrazing. A 2004 study declared that the greatest impact on plant life was not from grazing but from the damage plants sustained when trampled by the horses' hooves. Bankers pose a threat to ground-nesting animals such as sea turtles and shorebirds. Feral horses interrupt nesting activities and can crush the young.

== Management and adoption ==
As the Bankers are seen as a part of North Carolina's coastal heritage, they have been allowed to remain on the barrier islands. To cope with the expanding population, prevent inbreeding and attempt to minimize environmental damage, several organizations partner in managing the herds.

=== Ocracoke ===
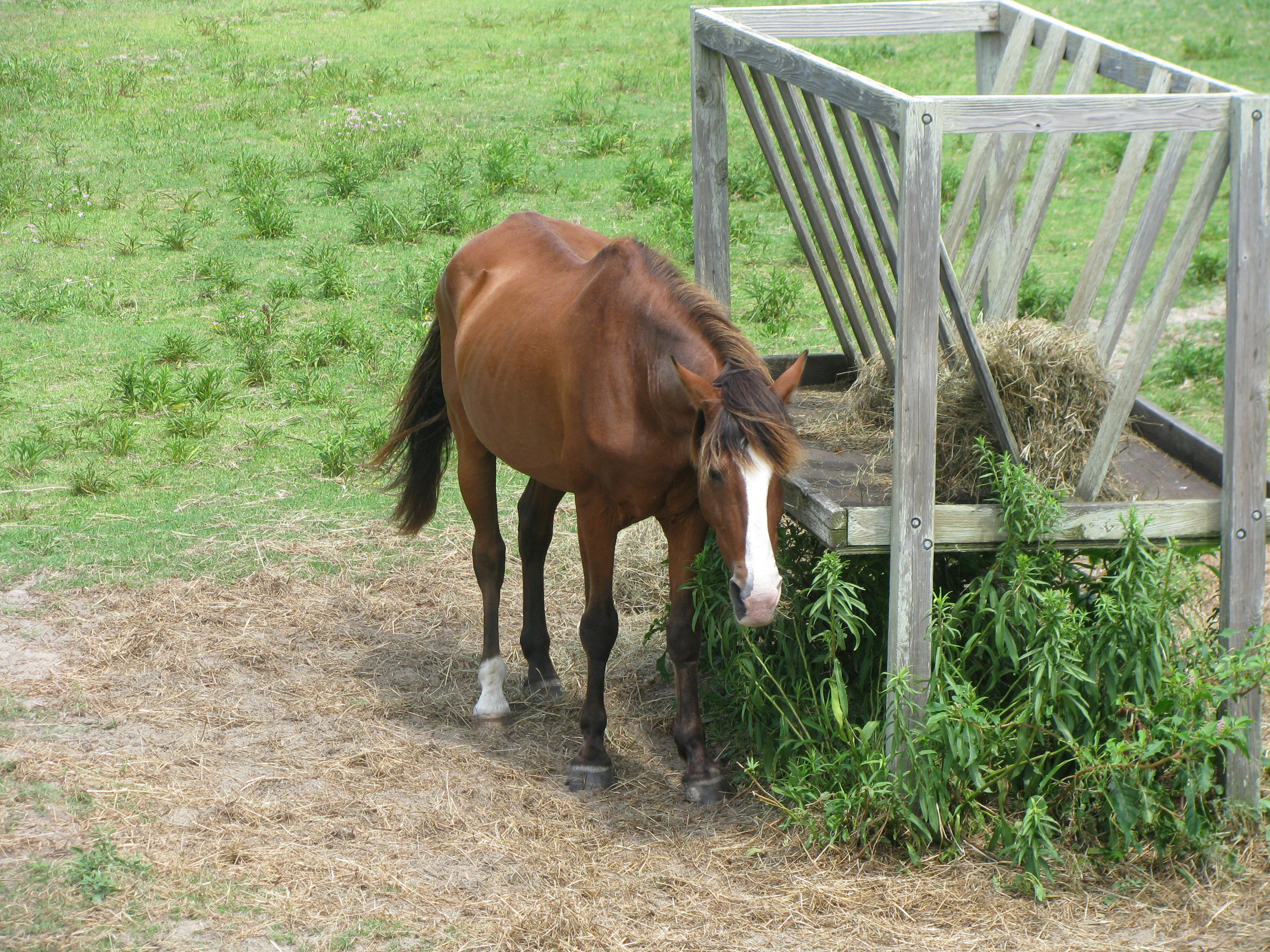
A Banker horse on Ocracoke Island

Since 1959, Bankers on Ocracoke Island have been confined to fenced areas of approximately 180 acres (0.73 km^{2}; 0.28 sq mi). The areas protect the horses from the traffic of North Carolina Highway 12, as well as safeguarding the island from overgrazing. The NPS, the authority managing the Ocracoke herd, supplements the horses' diet with additional hay and grain. In 2006, as a precaution against inbreeding, two fillies from the Shackleford herd were transported to Ocracoke.

=== Shackleford ===
Public Law 105-229, commonly referred to as the Shackleford Banks Wild Horses Protection Act, states that the Bankers on Shackleford Island are to be jointly managed by the National Park Service and another qualified nonprofit entity (currently the Foundation for Shackleford Horses). The herd is limited to 120–130 horses. Population management is achieved through adoption and by administering the contraceptive vaccine Porcine zona pellucida (PZP) to individual mares via dart. The island's horse population is monitored by freeze branding numbers onto each animal's left hindquarter. The identification of individuals allows the National Park Service to ensure correct gender ratios and to select which mares to inject with PZP.

Since 2000, adoptions of Bankers from Shackleford have been managed by the Foundation for Shackleford Horses. As of 2007, 56 horses had found new homes, 10 resided with another herd on Cedar Island, and two had been moved to the Ocracoke herd.

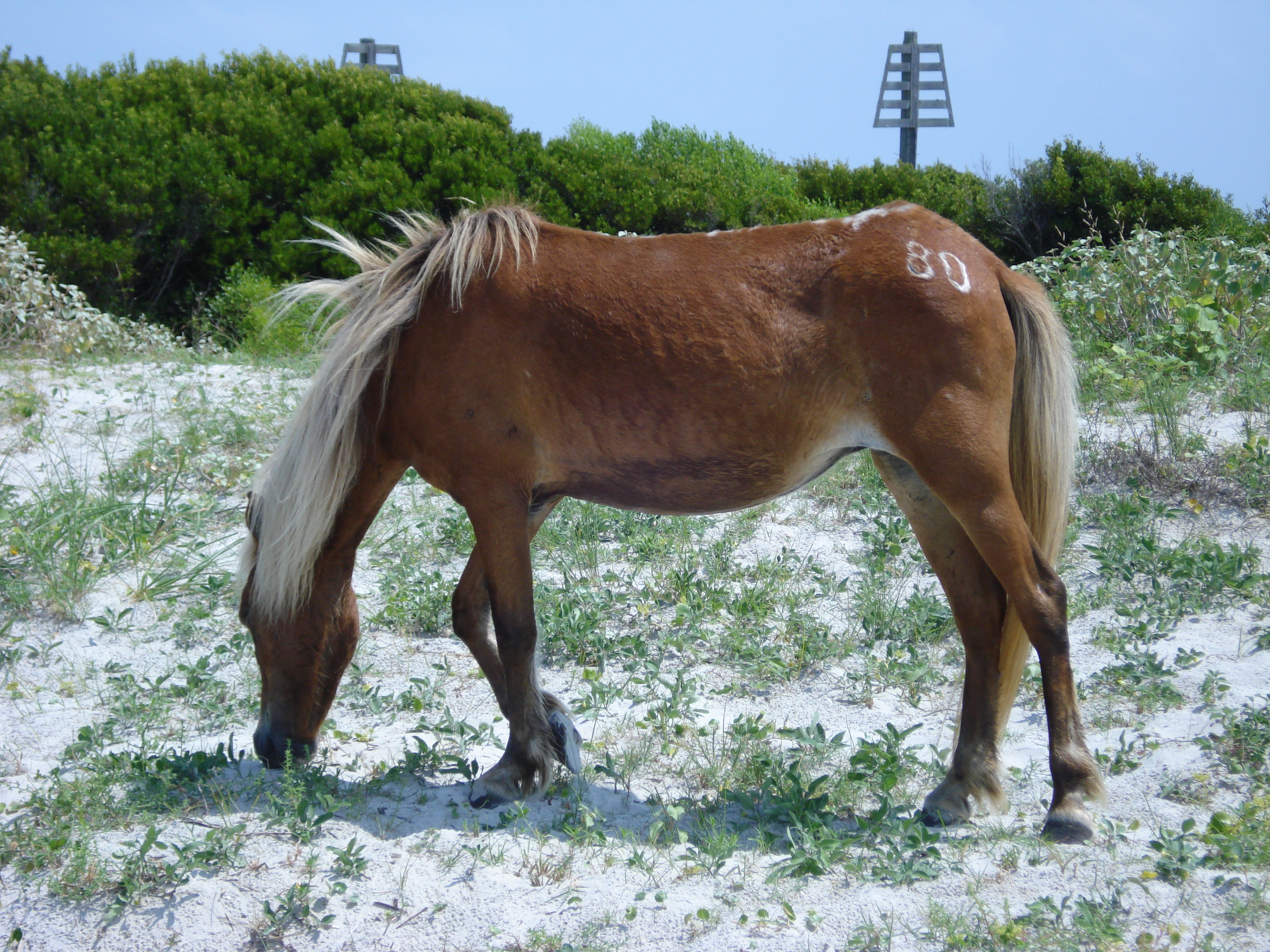
A freeze branded mare on Shackleford

On November 12, 1996, the Shackleford horses were rounded up by the North Carolina Department of Agriculture's Veterinary Division and tested for equine infectious anemia (EIA). EIA is a potentially lethal disease, a lentivirus transmitted by bodily fluids and insects. Seventy-six of the 184 captured horses tested positive. Those that tested negative were allowed to remain on the island and those with the disease were transported to a temporary quarantine facility. Finding a permanent, isolated area for such a large number of Bankers was a challenging task for the Foundation; eight days later the state declared all proposed locations for the herd unsuitable. It ordered the euthanization of the 76 infected horses. Two more horses died in the process—one that was fatally injured during the roundup, and an uninfected foal that slipped into the quarantined herd to be with its mother.

=== Currituck Banks ===
As a consequence of development in Corolla and Sandbridge during the 1980s, horses on Currituck Banks came into contact with humans more frequently. This proved to be dangerous and sometimes fatal for the horses. By 1989, eleven Bankers had been killed by cars on the newly constructed Highway 12, and several others in Sandbridge. That same year, the Corolla Wild Horse Fund, a nonprofit organization, was created to protect the horses from human interference. As a result of its efforts, the remainder of the herd was moved to a more remote part of Currituck Banks, where they were fenced into 1,800 acres (7.28 km^{2}; 2.81 sq mi) of combined federal and privately donated land between Corolla and the Virginia/North Carolina line. Corolla commissioners declared the site a horse sanctuary. The population is now managed by adopting out yearlings, both fillies and gelded colts. Conflicts over the preservation of the horses continued into 2012. In 2013, legislation was introduced to help preserve the herd on Currituck.

=== Rachel Carson Site, North Carolina National Estuarine Research Reserve ===
A herd lives on the Rachel Carson component of the North Carolina National Estuarine Research Reserve, a series of five small islands and several salt marshes. There were no horses at the Sanctuary until the 1940s. It is unclear whether the Bankers swam over from nearby Shackleford or were left by residents who had used the islands to graze livestock. They are owned and managed by the state of North Carolina and regarded as a cultural resource.

No management action was taken until the late 1980s and early 1990s, when after years of flourishing population, the island's carrying capacity was exceeded. Malnourishment caused by overcrowding resulted in the deaths of several horses; the reserve's staff instituted a birth control program to restrict the herd to about 40 animals.

== Uses ==
Adopted Bankers are often used for pleasure riding and driving. As they have a calm disposition, they are used as children's mounts. The breed has also been used in several mounted patrols.

Before 1915, the United States Lifesaving Service used horses for beach watches and rescues. In addition to carrying park rangers on patrols, the horses hauled equipment to and from shipwreck sites. During World War II, the Coast Guard used them for patrols. In the 1980s Bankers were used for beach duty at Cape Hatteras National Seashore.

In 1955, ten horses were taken from the Ocracoke herd as a project for Mounted Boy Scout Troop 290. After taming and branding the horses, the scouts trained them for public service activities. The Bankers were ridden in parades and used as mounts during programs to spray mosquito-ridden salt marshes.

== See also ==
- The Livestock Conservancy
- Carolina Marsh Tacky
- Chincoteague Pony
- Cumberland Island horse
- Equus Survival Trust
- Sable Island Pony
- Wildlife of North Carolina
