= Equus Survival Trust =

The Equus Survival Trust is a United States nonprofit organisation dedicated to helping conservation efforts for over 25 horse breeds considered "endangered" by the organization due to their rarity and danger of dying out. It is dedicated to protecting the genetic diversity and traditional traits of historical horse, pony and donkey breeds that are currently nearly extinct. They are doing this through conservation efforts, public education and support of associations for rare breeds. The organization places an emphasis on North American breeds and breeders. The Trust is the only conservation organization in the world that specializes in equines.

== Categorization ==
The Equus Survival Trust categorizes its 29 breeds into six conservation slots, from "critical/nearly extinct" (meaning less than 100 active breeding mares) up to "watch" (meaning 3000-5000 active adult breeding mares). They also have categories for "Recovering", which covers breeds previously listed that have exceeded the watch category but may need additional monitoring, and "Study", which covers breeds that are of genetic interest but need more study before they are considered for inclusion on the conservation list. Besides the various conservation levels, the Trust also categorizes animals by type, including small and large ponies, small horses, regular horses, draft horses and donkeys. The breeds on the list originate from around the world, and all of the breeds have viable breeding populations in North America.

== Conservation efforts ==
In 2006, the Trust partnered with the College of Veterinary Medicine & Biomedical Sciences at Texas A&M University to carry out an equine genome research project on rare horse breeds. Male members of 32 horse and donkey breeds were expected to be tested in the project. In 2007, the organization partnered with the American Livestock Breeds Conservancy in a project to preserve the Carolina Marsh Tacky, which is considered to be in critical condition with only 100-150 members of the breed remaining. DNA samples and photos were taken of a herd in South Carolina, considered to be the largest remaining herd, with a heritage tracing back to the American Civil War. DNA testing was undertaken in an effort to identify horses for a new studbook, reveal what DNA markers the breed carries, and map the breed's genetic place among all other horse breeds worldwide. Sixty horses were tested in the effort.

To promote the breeds that it is dedicated to preserving, the Trust holds or participates in various equine events. In 2006, they showcased the Caspian horse, Fell pony and Dales pony at Equine Affaire in Springfield, Massachusetts. The Trust partnered with five breed organizations to provide breed demonstrations, visitor information and public education. In 2008, the Trust organized a weekend-long event to exhibit around 120 animals representing 12 pony and horse breeds at the Kentucky Horse Park. The event was a combination of judged ridden events, including dressage and show jumping, breed demonstrations and public education.
