= A Celebration of Horses: The American Saddlebred =

TV special starring William Shatner

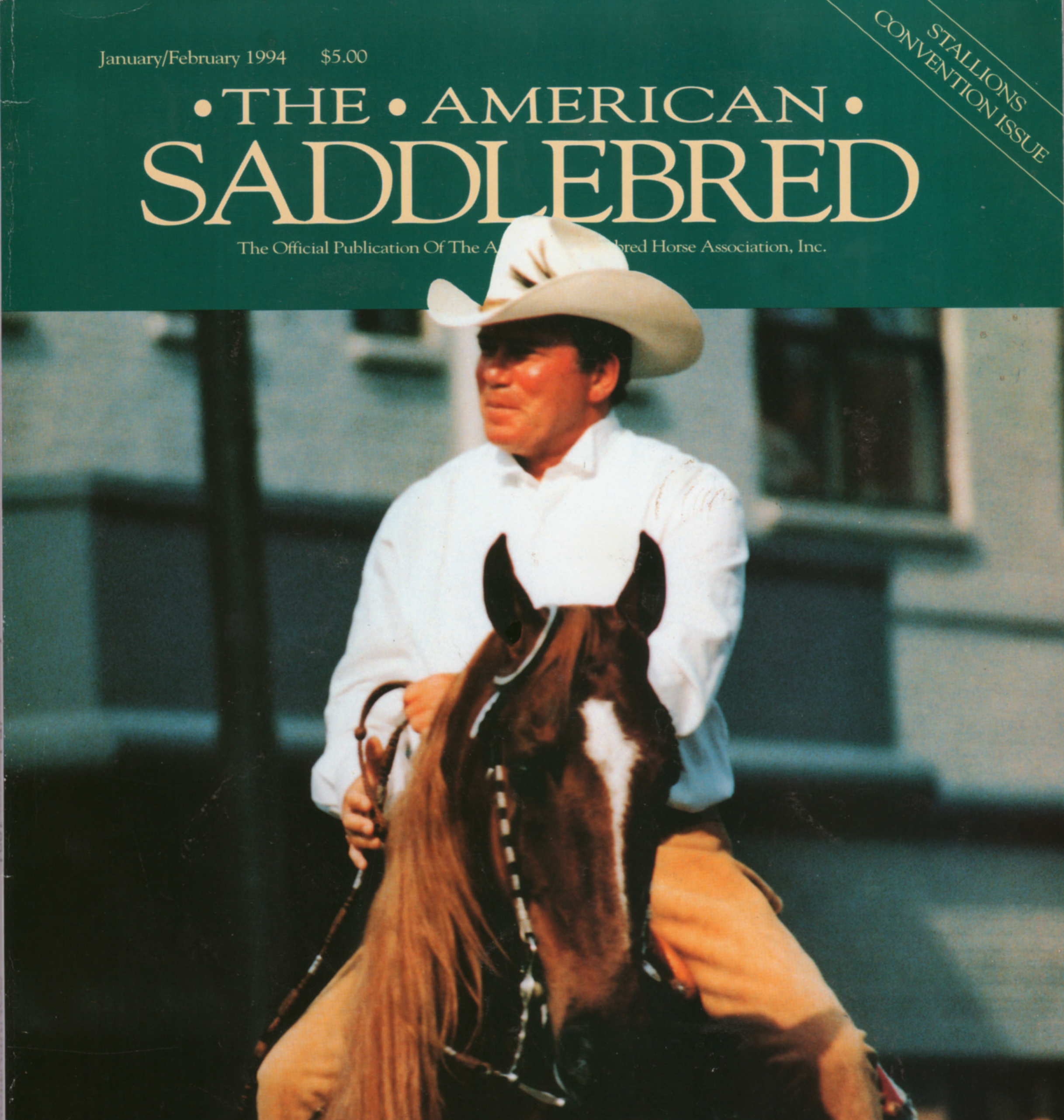
- Cover of American Saddlebred magazine featuring William Shatner
- Screenplay by: Betty Wills
- Presented by: WKNO-Memphis
- Starring: William Shatner
- Narrated by: Jon David Henry
- Music by: ASCAP

Production
- Executive producer: Betty Wills
- Producer: Axiom Entertainment
- Cinematography: Scott Jewett
- Editor: Joe Dixon
- Running time: 28:30

Original release
- Release: November 1993

A Celebration of Horses: The American Saddlebred was a half-hour television special about the American Saddlebred horse breed. It was scheduled for four national releases from November 1993 to October 1995 on the Public Broadcasting Service (PBS) in the United States on 56 regional affiliates, and was also broadcast into Canada. The program starred actor and horse enthusiast William Shatner. Most of the segments were taped on location with Shatner at his Belle Reve Farm, and at the Lexington Junior League Horse Show in Lexington, Kentucky.

== Concept and creation ==
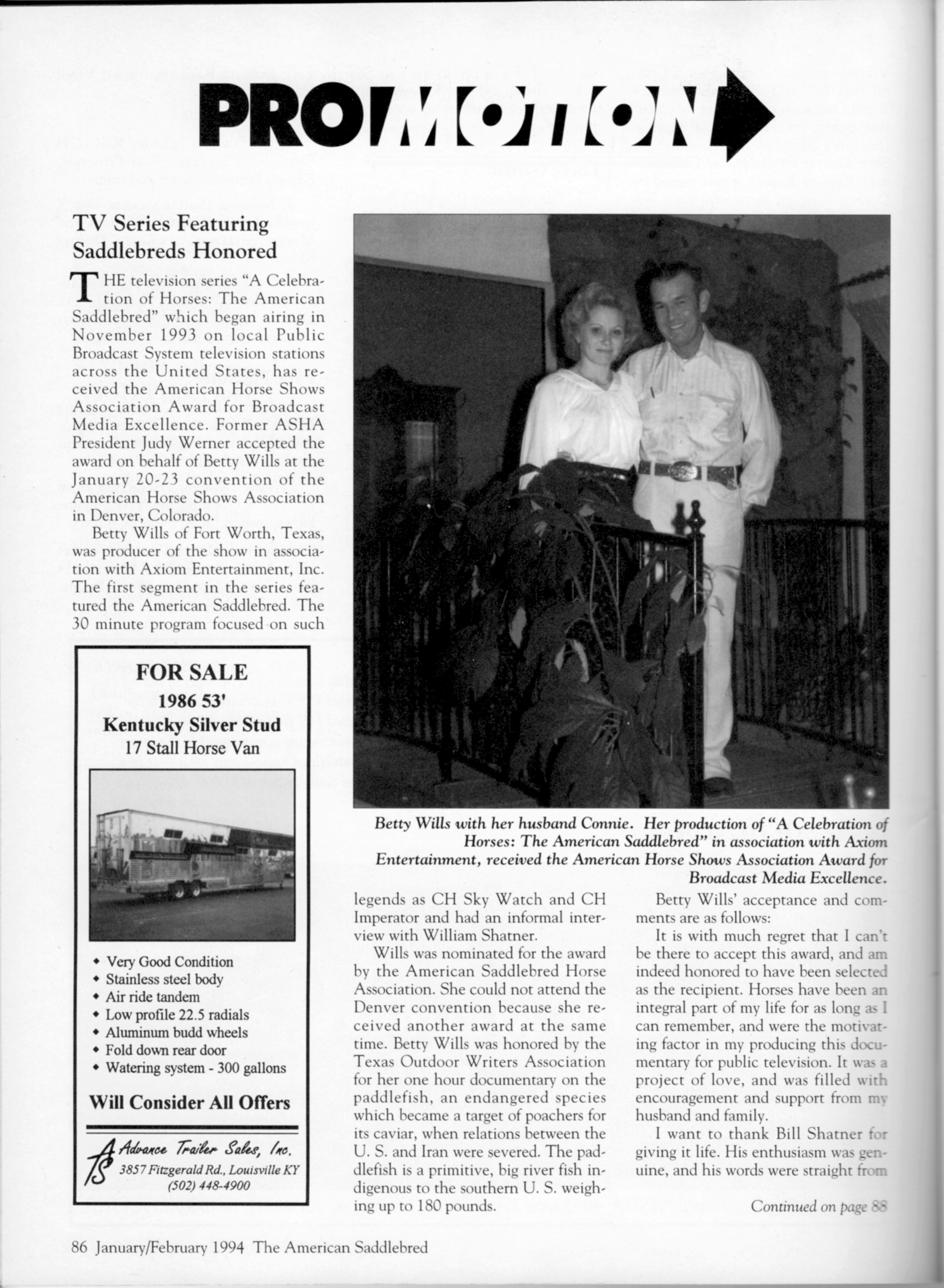
American Saddlebred coverage of the episode.

The documentary was produced as the pilot episode for a proposed PBS series titled A Celebration of Horses. The series was designed to showcase the history of various horse breeds, the evolution of equestrian sports and the preparation required for horse show competition. The series' origins correlated with the stated vision of former ASHA president Judy Werner, who said in the organization's 1989 Annual Meeting, "Don't we all feel that a television, radio, or magazine advertisement focusing on 'The Sport of Showing Horses,' regardless of the breed, would make us all proud? Convey to the public a positive feeling about the sport? Be effective? I do, and I guarantee you that is going to happen..." The series concept originated with executive producer Betty Wills, a competitor in equine sports. Patricia Nichols, former executive secretary of the American Saddlebred Horse Association; and Lynn Weatherman, former editor of The American Saddlebred magazine, participated as technical advisors in the production and also provided some of the stock footage.

== Cast ==
- William Shatner, celebrity guest
- Marcy Lafferty Shatner, then-wife of William Shatner, played the role of Chief DiFalco in Star Trek: The Motion Picture.
- Donna Moore, trainer of American Saddlebred Horses
- Melissa Moore, exhibitor of American Saddlebred Horses
- Lynn Weatherman, editor, The American Saddlebred
- Horses: Imperator, Sky Watch, Sultan's Great Day, and Miss O'Hare

== Background/production ==
Post-production and distribution of the episode was handled by PBS affiliate WKNO (TV) in Memphis, TN. WKNO was a member entry station for American Program Service (APS) (Note: In 1999, American Program Service changed their name to American Public Television) which handled broadcast distribution to the public television network comprising PBS member stations. Joe Dixon, an editor with WKNO at the time, did the post production editing and sound mix for the program.

== Theme ==
The episode features the history of the American Saddlebred Horse as a breed, and segues into guest host William Shatner speaking candidly about the preparation and training for horse show competition, breeding, raising and selling horses while guiding viewers on a tour of his Belle Reve Farm near Lexington, KY. Shatner also appears competing at the Lexington Junior League Horse Show and in an interview after his performance. The episode ended with the intense head-to-head competition between two of the all-time greatest five-gaited Champions of their time, the stallion Sky Watch and the gelding Imperator, in the stake competition at the Freedom Hall Civic Center in Louisville, Kentucky, referred to by some as "the biggest stage in the show horse industry."

== Release ==
As a pilot episode, A Celebration of Horses: The American Saddlebred was scheduled for four releases nationally on 56 PBS affiliates from November 1993 through October 1995.

== AHSA Award ==
The program won the 1993 AHSA Award for Broadcast Media Excellence. AHSA Award originated in 1993 as part of the Making Strides for Equestrian Sport initiative The American Saddlebred Horse Association nominated the program's executive director and subsequent winner of the broadcast division. Wills was one of five recipients to receive the award which was presented to former ASHA president Judy Werner on behalf of Wills at the 1994 American Horse Shows Association convention in Denver, Colorado.
