= Bourbon King =

- Breed: American Saddlebred
- Discipline: Five-gaited
- Sire: Bourbon Chief
- Grandsire: Harrison Chief
- Dam: Annie C
- Sex: Stallion
- Foaled: 1900
- Color: Chestnut
- Breeder: Allie G. Jones
- Owner: Allie G. Jones

Major wins
- Grand Championship in 1903

Bourbon King (foaled 1900) was an American Saddlebred stallion. He was known for being the founding sire of the popular Chief family of Saddlebreds.

== Life ==
Bourbon King was foaled in 1900. He was a chestnut stallion with a star and white coronets on his hind feet. He was sired by Bourbon Chief and out of Annie C. Bourbon King was bred and owned by Allie G. Jones, who had a farm near North Middletown, Kentucky. Jones was elected president of the American Saddle Horse Breeders' Association, the forerunner to the American Saddlebred Horse Association, in 1936. Bourbon King lived to be 30 years old.

== Career ==
Bourbon King was a five-gaited horse. He won the Grand Championship at the Louisville Horse Show at age three.

== Offspring ==
Bourbon King was the progenitor of the Chief family, one of the most influential bloodlines in Saddlebreds. His son Edna May's King was the first horse to repeat win the Grand Championship at the Kentucky State Fair. One of Bourbon King's descendants, Wing Commander, was the first five-gaited horse to win six consecutive World Grand Championships.

== Sire line tree ==
- Bourbon King
  - Richelieu King
  - Charming King
  - Edna Mays King
    - Cameo Kirby
      - Ensign Kirby
        - Majestic Ensign
      - The Lemon Drop Kid
    - Anacacho Denmark
      - Anacacho Empire
      - Ridgefields Denmark
      - Golden Thunderbolt
      - Americus Denmark
      - Denmarks Bourbon Genius
        - Monti Scott
        - Hide-A-Ways Wild Country
      - Clarma
      - Omans Anacachos Rhythm
      - Omans Desdemona Denmark
        - Flame of Denmark
          - Madeiras Gift
            - Roseridge Heir
              - Courageous Lord
        - All Hail Columbia
        - Blackberry Winter
      - Broadlands Captain Denmark
    - Anacacho Revel
    - Anacacho Shamrock
      - Wing Commander
        - Rhythm Command
        - Buck and Wing
        - Sunset Commander
        - Wing Again
        - Wing Rhythm
        - Wingmaster
        - Danish Commander
        - Callaways Johnny Gillen
        - Wings Fleet Admiral
        - Nobles Command
        - Rebel Command
        - The New Look
        - Wing Society
        - Chief Of Greystone
        - Flight Time
        - Super Command
        - Wings Over Jordan
        - Hi-Wing
        - Mr Magic Man
        - Center Ring
        - Yorktown
        - King Dell
        - Wing Commanders King
        - Lucky Commander
        - Wing Shot
      - Private Contract
        - The Contender
      - Command Decision
      - King Of Harmony
      - Gay Lover
      - Priceless Heritage
      - My Kings X
      - Rocket Patrol
      - Main Title
  - Kings Genius
    - Leatherwood King
    - Bourbon Genius
      - Genius Bourbon King
        - The Rambler
        - Mr America
        - Valley View Supreme
  - King Sport
  - King Barrymore
