= Boucheron (horse) =

- Breed: American Saddlebred
- Discipline: Five-gaited
- Sire: Shamrock Santana
- Dam: Whata Jewel Whata Jewel
- Sex: Gelding
- Color: Chestnut
- Breeder: Stonecroft Farm
- Trainer: Rob Byers

Major wins
- Juvenile Five-Gaited World's Championship in 1997; Five-Gaited Gelding World's Championship in 1998, 1999; Five-Gaited World's Grand Championship in 2004

Awards
- Five-Gaited Horse of the Year in 2004

Boucheron was an American Saddlebred horse who won the Five-Gaited World's Grand Championship in 2004, the same year he won the five-gaited stake classes in the Lexington Junior League and American Royal Horse Shows, making him a Saddlebred Triple Crown winner.

== Life and career ==
Boucheron was a chestnut gelding bred by Stonecroft Farm. His sire was Shamrock Santana and his dam was Whata Jewel Whata Jewel. He was trained by Rob Byers. In 1997 he won the Junior Five-Gaited World's Championship in the World's Championship Horse Show. He was expected by horse professionals in the Saddlebred industry to win the World's Grand Championship, but the following two years he only won the Five-Gaited Gelding World's Championship. In 2004 he won the Five-Gaited Championship in the Lexington Junior League Horse Show. He went on to the World's Championship Horse Show and won the Five-Gaited World's Grand Championship. Following that win, he won the Five-Gaited Championship in the American Royal Horse Show in November. The three wins made him a Saddlebred Triple Crown winner, an unusual feat. Boucheron was named Five-Gaited Horse of the Year for 2004 by the United Professional Horsemens Association. Boucheron died suddenly at Rob Byers' Premier Stable April 1, 2006. Strong thunderstorms had come through the area the night before, but it was not known if they had anything to do with Boucheron's death.

Owned by Tom and Juanita Groub.
