= Breaking News (horse) =

Horse who won the Saddlebred Triple Crown in 2008

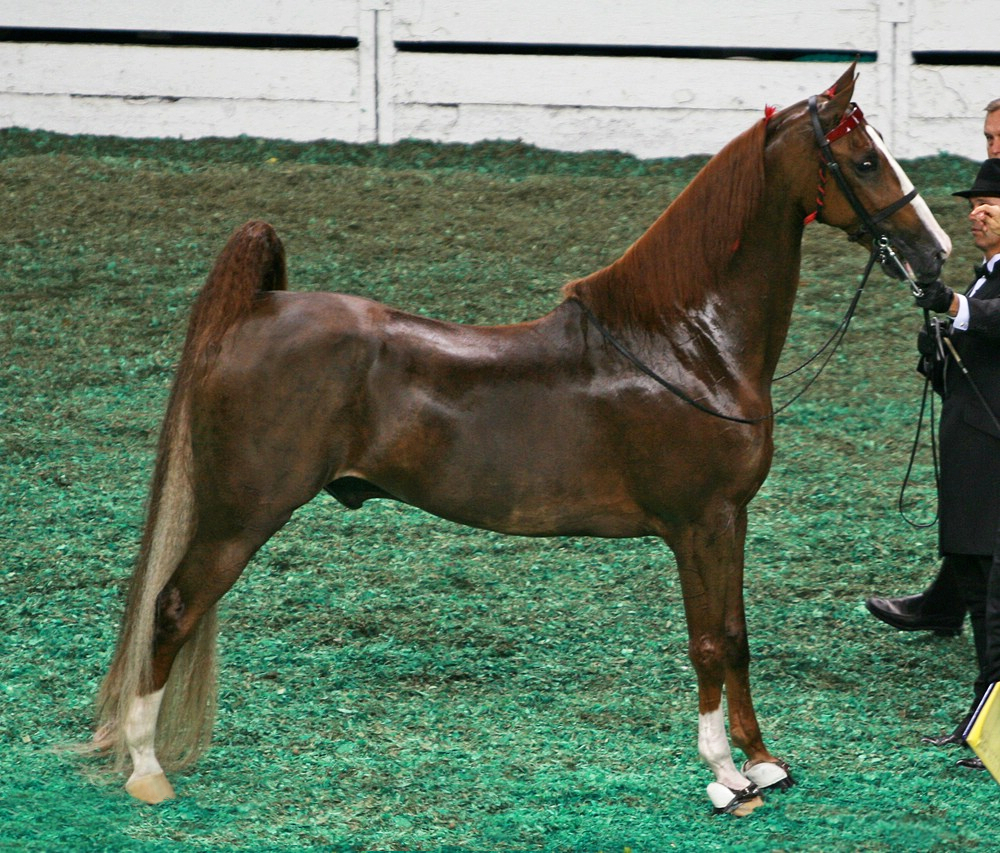
- Breaking News in the World's Grand Championship
- Breed: American Saddlebred
- Discipline: Five-gaited
- Sire: The Talk of the Town
- Dam: Reedann's Cascade
- Sex: Gelding
- Color: Chestnut
- Breeder: Dr. Alan Raun
- Owner: Beth Arndt and Megan McClure
- Trainer: Peter Cowart

Major wins
- Lexington Junior League five-gaited stake in 2008; Five-Gaited World's Grand Championship in 2008; American Royal five-gaited stake in 2008; Triple Crown in 2008

Awards
- Horse of the Year in 2009

Breaking News is an American Saddlebred horse who won the Saddlebred Triple Crown in 2008, meaning he won the five-gaited stake in the Lexington Junior League Horse Show, the Five-Gaited World's Grand Championship in the World's Championship Horse Show, and the five-gaited stake in the American Royal Horse Show in the same year.

== Life and career ==
Breaking News is a chestnut gelding who was sired by The Talk of the Town and out of the mare Reedann's Cascade. He was bred by Dr. Alan Raun of Cumming, Iowa. Breaking News was trained by Peter Cowart of West Wind Stables in Statesville, North Carolina. He was bought by Beth Arndt and her granddaughter Megan McClure in 2003. In July 2008 Cowart entered him in the Lexington Junior League Horse Show, where he won the five-gaited stake.

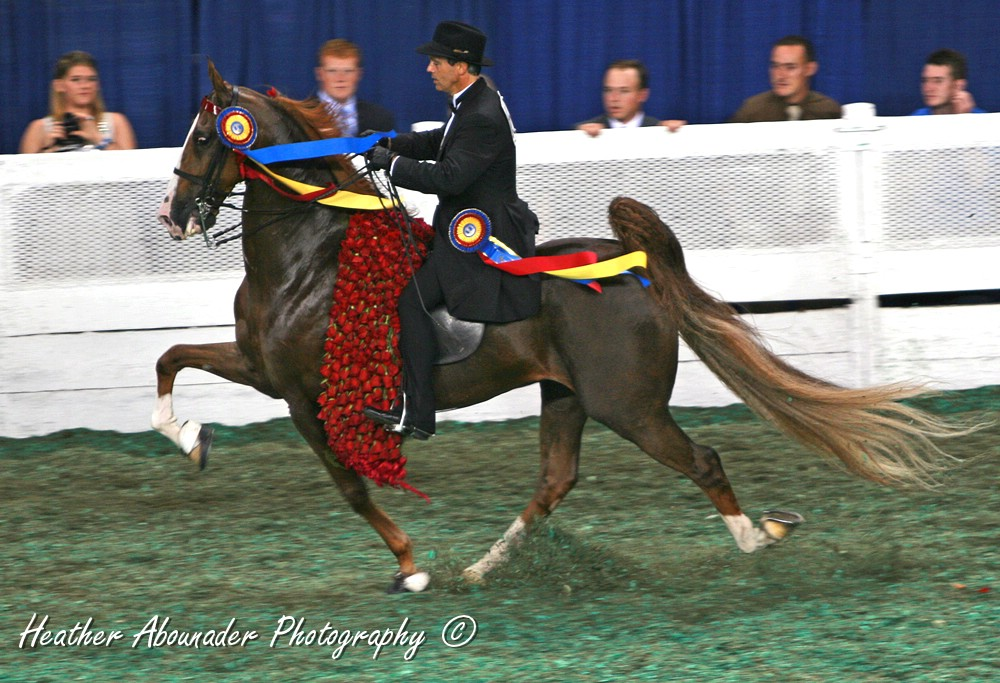
Breaking News in the World's Championship Horse Show, victory lap

Breaking News won the Five-Gaited World's Grand Championship at the World's Championship Horse Show in late August. In November he won the five-gaited stake in the American Royal Horse Show, making him a Saddlebred Triple Crown winner; a horse who wins the American Royal, Lexington Junior League, and World's Championship Horse Shows' five-gaited stake classes in the same calendar year. At the 2009 Saddlebred Ball, held in February, Breaking News was named the Horse of the Year.
