= My-My (horse) =

- Breed: American Saddlebred
- Discipline: Five-gaited
- Sire: Beau Fortune
- Dam: Daneshall's Easter Parade
- Sex: Mare
- Foaled: 1957
- Owner: Jolie Richardson
- Trainer: Frank Bradshaw

Major wins
- 6 five-gaited World Grand Championships

My-My (1957–1968) was an American Saddlebred mare. She was one of only two horses ever to win six Five-Gaited World's Grand Championships in the World's Championship Horse Show.

== Life ==
My-My was foaled in 1957. Her dam, Daneshall's Easter Parade, was the only horse to ever beat Wing Commander, the only other six-time World Grand Champion. Her sire was Beau Fortune. My-My died October 1 1968, of liver failure. She was eleven years old.

== Career ==
My-My was trained by Frank Bradshaw, and won a total of six five-gaited World Grand Championships at the World's Championship Horse Show, from 1963 to 1968. When she won her first World title in 1963, she was owned by Daneshall Stables, but she was sold to Jolie Richardson of Atlanta, Georgia before the second title. My-My was a five-gaited horse, meaning she performed the walk, trot, canter, slow gait and rack. Jolie Richardson was in the hospital with cancer when My-My competed in and won her final World Grand Championship in 1968. Richardson watched the show from her bed, and died of her disease some time later.
