= Michele Davis Macfarlane =

Horse trainer

- Birth name: Michele Davis
- Occupation: Horse trainer, horse breeder, businesswoman
- Discipline: Saddle seat
- Born: September 29, 1948 (age 77); San Diego
- Major wins/Championships: Five-Gaited World's Grand Championship in 1988; Five-Gaited World's Grand Championship 1996; Five-Gaited World's Grand Championship in 2007
- Lifetime achievements: Director of California Saddle Horse Breeders Association

Honors
- Inducted into the Kentucky State Fair Hall of Fame 1998; Lurline Roth Sportsmanship Award in 1996; Meritorious Service Award in 2009; Gordon Jenkins International Award in 2013

Significant horses
- Chubasco, CH Sky Watch, CH Memories' Citation, CCV Casey’s Final Countdown

Michele Macfarlane (born 1948) is an American horse trainer who competes in the sport of saddle seat. She has been one of the leading trainers and riders in the sport for over 40 years. Macfarlane resides in San Diego, California and is Marshal for the Scripps Miramar Ranch Saddlebreds parade unit.

== Life and career ==
She was born in 1948 to Everett Conley Davis, and Ellen Browning Scripps Davis. Her father was a lawyer and the grandson of Paschal Conley and her mother the granddaughter of E.W. Scripps and niece of Ellen Browning Scripps.

She grew up on her family's Scripps Miramar Ranch, near San Diego. When she was five years old, her mother introduced her to the family horse riding tradition. Horses gave her hay fever, meaning she initially disliked working with them. However, she came to appreciate her role around the age of ten, when her mother bought a solid-colored Saddlebred and put her and the horse in training with Bill Rowan. Thanks to her mother's love of both parades and pinto horses, she had the innovation of breeding spotted parade horses of Saddlebred bloodlines, eventually taking part in San Diego New Year's parade in 1962.

This became a tradition and the 129th Rose Parade in 2018 was Macfarlane and the Scripps Miramar Ranch's 34th appearance

In 1979, she bought Sky Watch, whose legendary career earned him the title of Five-gaited Horse of the Century by American Saddlebred magazine. Michele rode him to his fourth and final World Grand Championship in 1988, becoming the first woman amateur to ever achieve that win. She would repeat that win with Memories Citation in 1996 and CCV Casey's Final Countdown in 2007. She remains the only person to have entered the Five-Gaited Championship three times and winning all three times.

On May 26, 1985, Michele and Ellen Scripps Davis impressed the coaching division of the Devon Horse Show with their bay Hackney four.

== Career timeline ==
1988

- 1st, World Championship Horse Show Five-Gaited Championship, Freedom Hall, Louisville Kentucky. On Sky Watch Here she became the first female rider to win the five-gaited stake at the World's Grand Championship

1996

- 1st, World Championship Horse Show Five-Gaited Championship, Freedom Hall, Louisville Kentucky. On Memories' Citation
- Lurline Roth Sportsmanship Award at the American Saddlebred Horse Association Convention

1998

- Inducted into the Kentucky State Fair Hall of Fame
- At the Winter Olympics in Nagano, Japan, Macfarlane's spotted Saddlebreds featured in the closing ceremony

2007

- 1st, World Championship Horse Show Five-Gaited Championship, Freedom Hall, Louisville Kentucky. On SA (CCV) Casey's Final Countdown Here Macfarlane became one of only two living riders to have won the Five-Gaited World's Grand Championship three times with three different horses

2009

- Meritorious Service Award at the American Saddlebred Horse Association Convention

2012

- Represented the United States in the Queen's Diamond Jubilee celebration. Macfarlane's Californian Stagecoach was introduced by Helen Mirren.

2013

- Gordon Jenkins International Award at the American Saddlebred Horse Association Convention

== Personal life ==
She is the great-granddaughter of Paschal Conley, meaning she is related to the legendary Jess "Longshot" Conley, who ran the Kentucky Derby in 1911. On February 16, 1998, both Ellen Scripps Davis and Everett Conley Davis died in a house fire. Michele took over the ranch and continued the family legacy, even winning the ASHA Meritorious Service Award at the American Saddlebred Horse Association Convention that same year.
