= Courageous Lord =

American show horse (2001–2023)

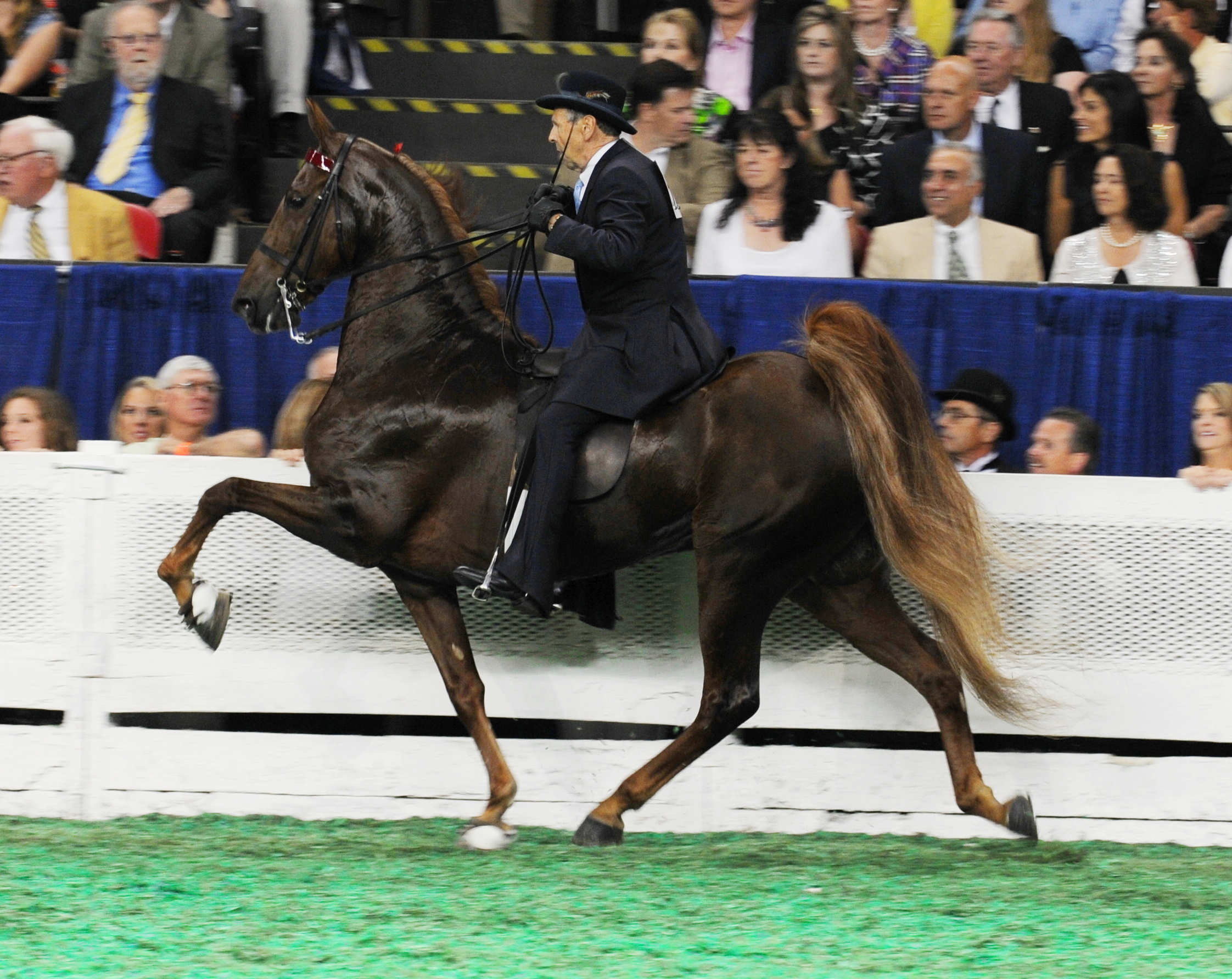
- Courageous Lord in the World's Championship Horse Show
- Breed: American Saddlebred
- Discipline: Five-gaited
- Sex: Gelding
- Foaled: 2001
- Died: January 7, 2023
- Color: Chestnut
- Breeder: Mike Barlow
- Owner: Lisa Jones; Marsha Shepard & Bill Richardson; Fox Grape Farms
- Trainer: Mike Barlow; Merrill Murray; Steve Wheeler

Major wins
- Five-Gaited World's Grand Championship 2009, 2010, 2011; Amateur Five-Gaited World's Champion of Champions, 2012

Awards
- Horse of Honor in 2012

Courageous Lord (2001 - 2023) was an American Saddlebred horse who won the Five-Gaited World's Grand Championship in the World's Championship Horse Show three consecutive years.

== Life and career ==
Courageous Lord, affectionately known as Joe, was a dark chestnut gelding foaled in 2001. He was bred and trained under saddle by Mike Barlow before being sold to Lisa Jones as a four-year-old. He competed in a few horse shows that year but had a tendency to interfere and injured himself, resulting in spending his five-year-old year on pasture rest. As a six-year-old he was sold to Bill Richardson and Marsha Shepard. For a time after the sale, Courageous Lord remained in training with Barlow, but when he was injured the owners put Courageous Lord in training with Merrill Murray, a Canadian native who lives in Versailles, Kentucky.

Courageous Lord's first horse show with Murray was in Indianapolis and was described by Murray as "wild". His second was the 2009 Lexington Junior League Horse Show, where he won the five-gaited Championship. Murray and the owners entered Courageous Lord in the 2009 World's Championship Horse Show and he won the Five-Gaited World's Grand Championship. He repeated his win the next year, 2010, and again in 2011.

Courageous Lord was named Horse of Honor by the United States Equestrian Federation in 2012. The same year he was sold to Fox Grape Farms and put under the training of Steve Wheeler. Ridden by Wheeler, he won the Five-Gaited Grand Championship in the 2012 Bonnie Blue National Horse Show before going on to the World's Championship. There he won Amateur Five-Gaited Champion of Champions with owner Dr. Owen Weaver in the irons.

Joe, as he was known to his connections, died at the age of 22 in January, 2023.
