= Wing Commander (horse) =

Show horse

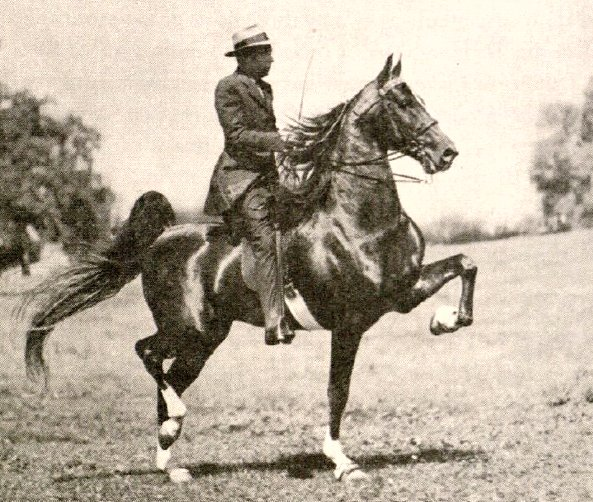
- Breed: American Saddlebred
- Sire: Anacacho Shamrock
- Grandsire: Edna May's King
- Dam: Flirtation Walk
- Maternal grandsire: Kings Genius
- Sex: Stallion
- Foaled: 1943
- Country: United States of America
- Color: Chestnut, four white socks and star
- Owner: Dodge Stables
- Trainer: Earl Teater

Major wins
- 6 Five-Gaited World's Grand Championships

Wing Commander (1943–1969) was an American Saddlebred show horse out of the mare Flirtation Walk and by the stallion Anacacho Shamrock. Wing Commander was a chestnut with four white socks and a thin white stripe that ran from his forehead all the way to his upper lip. He was trained to be a five-gaited horse, meaning he performed the walk, trot, canter, slow gait and rack. Through both sides of his pedigree, Wing Commander traced back to the highly influential Saddlebred stallions Rex McDonald and Bourbon King, who were themselves successful show horses. In 1948, the stallion won his first Five-Gaited World Grand Championship, a title he kept for a total of six years. In total he won 6 Five-Gaited World Grand Championships, and was the first of only two horses to accomplish this. In 1950 Life magazine featured Wing Commander as an example of a fine athlete and an American Idol. He was owned by Dodge Stables, and trained by Marvin Lane and ridden by Earl Teater. Wing Commander stood at stud at Castleton Farm in Lexington, Kentucky, and died at the age of 26.

== Life and career ==
Wing Commander was foaled in 1943. He was a chestnut stallion with four white socks and a white star on his forehead. He was out of the mare Flirtation Walk and sired by the stallion Anacacho Shamrock. He was bred and owned by Dodge Stables, a part of Castleton Farm near Lexington, Kentucky which at the time was owned by Frances Dodge. His bloodlines traced back to Rex McDonald and Bourbon King, who appeared on both his sire and dam's side. Wing Commander was a five-gaited Saddlebred, meaning that in addition to the default walk, trot, and canter, he also performed a slow gait and rack. He was trained by the notable Saddlebred trainer Earl Teater and groomed by Gregory Pena. Wing Commander began his show career in 1946, as a three-year-old. He won every show he entered that year, but lost twice the next year, 1947, when he was shown against older horses. Both losses ended with him placing second. In 1948 Wing Commander and Teater won the first of six World's Grand Championships at the World's Championship Horse Show, part of the Kentucky State Fair. In addition to being shown under saddle, Wing Commander was trained to pull a fine harness cart, although he was not shown in harness.

Wing Commander died January 19, 1969.

== Descendants ==
Following his show career, Wing Commander was retired to stud and was the leading Saddlebred sire from 1963 to 1968. Wing Commander was grandsire to Sky Watch, who won five World's Grand Championships, and maternal grandsire to Imperator, who won four World's Grand Championships. The two horses were also known for their "duels" or shows where they competed against each other.

Sire line descent tree
- Wing Commander
  - Rhythm Command
  - Buck and Wing
    - Longstreet
  - Sunset Commander
  - Wing Again
  - Wing Rhythm
  - Wingmaster
    - Jubilee Commander
    - My Own Master
  - Danish Commander
  - Callaways Johnny Gillen
    - Will Shriver
      - Callaways New Look
      - Caramac
        - Callaways Arbitrator
        - Callaways Newscaster
        - Designed
        - Callaways Lil Abner
        - Callaways Lloyd Stark
        - Callaways Ricky Ricardo
        - Undulatas Nutcracker
      - Callaways Mr Republican
      - Callaways Blue Norther
        - Callaways Forecaster
        - Callaways Banner Headline
      - The Showboat
      - Callaways Gold Rush
  - Wings Fleet Admiral
    - Courageous Admiral
      - Periaptor
      - Top Spool
        - Top of the Mark
    - Superior Odds
  - Nobles Command
  - Rebel Command
  - The New Look
  - Wing Society
  - Chief Of Greystone
  - Flight Time
    - Sky Watch
      - Castle Bravo
  - Super Command
  - Wings Over Jordan
  - Hi-Wing
  - Mr Magic Man
  - Center Ring
  - Yorktown
    - New Yorker
      - Manhattan Supreme
        - Catalyst
      - Harlem Globetrotter
        - Harlem Town
      - Im A New Yorker
    - Quaker Town
    - The Talk of the Town
      - Breaking News
    - Man On The Town
  - King Dell
  - Wing Commanders King
  - Lucky Commander
  - Wing Shot

== Pedigree ==
Pedigree of Wing Commander
Sire Anacacho Shamrock	Edna Mays King	Bourbon King*	Bourbon Chief*
Sire Anacacho Shamrock	Edna Mays King	Bourbon King*	Annie C*
Sire Anacacho Shamrock	Edna Mays King	Edna May	Rex Peavine
Sire Anacacho Shamrock	Edna Mays King	Edna May	Lee Wood
Sire Anacacho Shamrock	Sally Cameron	Highland Squirrel King	Forest King
Sire Anacacho Shamrock	Sally Cameron	Highland Squirrel King	Nellie P
Sire Anacacho Shamrock	Sally Cameron	Al Tadena	Prince Arthur
Sire Anacacho Shamrock	Sally Cameron	Al Tadena	Mania
Dam Flirtation Walk	King's Genius	Bourbon King*	Bourbon Chief*
Dam Flirtation Walk	King's Genius	Bourbon King*	Annie C*
Dam Flirtation Walk	King's Genius	Princess Eugenia	Chester Peavine
Dam Flirtation Walk	King's Genius	Princess Eugenia	Queen of Lincoln
Dam Flirtation Walk	Spelling Bee	King Vine	Rex Peavine
Dam Flirtation Walk	Spelling Bee	King Vine	Bourbon Belle
Dam Flirtation Walk	Spelling Bee	Daughter of Red Light II	Red Light II
Dam Flirtation Walk	Spelling Bee	Daughter of Red Light II	Daughter of Happy Bell

* Wing Commander is inbred 3S x 3D to the stallion Bourbon King, meaning that he appears third generation on the sire side of his pedigree and third generation on the dam side of his pedigree.
