= Rex McDonald =

American Saddlebred stallion

- Breed: American Saddlebred
- Discipline: Five-gaited
- Sire: Rex Denmark
- Dam: Lucy Mack
- Maternal grandsire: Black Squirrel
- Foaled: May 30, 1890
- Died: November 13, 1913 (aged 23)
- Breeder: Joe McDonald
- Trainer: Billy Davis; Tom Bass

Rex McDonald was an American Saddlebred stallion. He was only beaten three times in his show career and had an influential career as a sire.

== Life ==
Rex McDonald was foaled on May 30, 1890, in Callaway County, Missouri. He was sired by Rex Denmark and out of Lucy Mack. He was a black stallion standing 16 hands (64 inches, 163 cm) high and was bred by Joe McDonald. After breeding Rex McDonald, Joe McDonald became ill and began selling his horses. Rex McDonald was sold to R. T. Freeman as a yearling for $105, alongside his dam. In 1894 he was sold to John Hughes of Kentucky for $3,050. He was sold several more times and at one point during his breeding career was owned by a group of businessmen. Rex McDonald died November 13, 1913, and was buried in the fairgrounds at Mexico, Missouri, although the body was later moved to Tom Bass's property and still later reburied at the American Saddlebred Museum in Mexico, where it remains.

== Career ==
Rex McDonald was a five-gaited horse who was initially trained by Billy Davis. Later on he was trained and shown by Tom Bass, a notable horse trainer born a slave, who trained horses for Theodore Roosevelt and Bill Cody. In 1893 Rex McDonald was shown for the first time at the St. Louis National Horse Show and won a championship. At the time, there was a strong rivalry between Kentucky and Missouri about which state produced the best Saddlebreds, and Rex McDonald was a star for the Missourians. Ironically, he was later sold to a Kentucky owner. He was only beaten three times in his career. At one show, he beat his own sire, Rex Denmark. He was finally retired to stud because few people were willing to show against him.

== Offspring ==
Rex McDonald sired over 200 colts that were registered with the American Saddlebred Horse Association. One of his colts was a pacer and was harness raced.

Sire line descendant tree
- Rex McDonald
  - McDonald Chief
    - Red McDonald
    - Independence Chief
      - Chief Of Longview
      - Reveler
    - Easter Cloud
      - Arletha's Easter Cloud
        - Masked Marvel
    - Jack Barrymore
    - My McDonald
    - Lee Rose McDonald
  - Rex Blees
  - Rex Peavine
    - Rexall Price
    - Jack Twigg
    - Chester Peavine
    - Jean Val Jean
    - Bugger Boo
    - Anglo Rex
      - Anglo Peavine
        - Doras Peavine
    - Mass of Gold
    - Dark Rex
    - Mercer Rex
      - Gallant Knight
    - Kalarama Rex
      - Society Rex
        - Society Yankee
        - Secret Society
      - Kalarama Colonel
        - Delmars Colonel Valiant
    - Oakland Peavine
    - Oklahoma Peavine
    - Moreland Peavine
  - Star McDonald
  - Rex Monroe
  - Majestic McDonald
    - Solano
      - Rey El Marino
        - Revel's Cream of Wheat
          - The Harvester
            - Bamboo Harvester

== Pedigree ==
Pedigree of Rex McDonald
Sire Rex Denmark	Crigler's Denmark	Lail's Denmark Chief	Gaines' Denmark
Sire Rex Denmark	Crigler's Denmark	Lail's Denmark Chief	Brown Kitty
Sire Rex Denmark	Crigler's Denmark	Bettie Crosby	Ed Hawkins
Sire Rex Denmark	Crigler's Denmark	Bettie Crosby	Queen
Sire Rex Denmark	Daughter of Star of the West	Star of the West	Flying Cloud
Sire Rex Denmark	Daughter of Star of the West	Star of the West	Gray Fanny
Sire Rex Denmark	Daughter of Star of the West	Daughter of Mohawk	Mohawk
Sire Rex Denmark	Daughter of Star of the West	Daughter of Mohawk	Copperbottom mare
Dam Lucy Mack	Black Squirrel	Black Eagle	King William
Dam Lucy Mack	Black Squirrel	Black Eagle	Kitty Richards
Dam Lucy Mack	Black Squirrel	Mollie	Giltners Brown Highlander
Dam Lucy Mack	Black Squirrel	Mollie	Betty
Dam Lucy Mack	Star	Old Star Davis	Boston
Dam Lucy Mack	Star	Old Star Davis	Unknown
Dam Lucy Mack	Star	Mollie	Vermont Morgan
Dam Lucy Mack	Star	Mollie	Unknown
