= Harrison Chief =

- Breed: American Saddlebred
- Sire: Clark Chief
- Dam: Lute Boyd
- Sex: Stallion
- Foaled: 1872
- Breeder: James Cromwell
- Owner: James Cromwell

Harrison Chief was an American Saddlebred stallion, who was chosen as the second foundation sire of his breed.

== Life ==
Harrison Chief was foaled in 1872, sired by Clark Chief and out of the mare Lute Boyd. He was descended from the imported Thoroughbred stallion Messenger, but both his parents were American Saddlebreds. He was bred by James Cromwell of Cynthiana, Kentucky.

== Influence ==
Harrison Chief was chosen as the second foundation sire of the American Saddlebred by the American Saddlebred Horse Association at its centennial in 1991. Previously, Denmark had been the only recognized foundation stallion. He sired Bourbon Chief and was grandsire of Bourbon King, a notable show horse. Harrison Chief was the ancestor of Wing Commander, the first Saddlebred to win six World Grand Championships.

== Sire line tree ==
- Harrison Chief
  - Bourbon Chief
    - Montgomery Chief
    - Bourbon King
      - Richelieu King
      - Charming King
      - Edna Mays King
        - Cameo Kirby
        - Anacacho Denmark
        - Anacacho Revel
        - Anacacho Shamrock
      - Kings Genius
        - Leatherwood King
        - Bourbon Genius
      - King Sport
      - King Barrymore
