= Sky Watch (horse) =

- Breed: American Saddlebred
- Discipline: Five-gaited
- Sire: Flight Time
- Grandsire: Wing Commander
- Dam: Aries Golden Gift
- Sex: Stallion
- Foaled: June 14, 1977
- Color: Chestnut
- Breeder: Della Large
- Owner: Michele McFarlane

Major wins
- Five-Gaited World's Grand Championships 1982-84, 1988; Five-Gaited Stallion World's Grand Championships 1982-85, 1988

Awards
- Five-gaited Horse of the Century

Sky Watch was a five-gaited American Saddlebred show horse. He won four open World's Grand Championships and five stallion World's Grand Championships in the World's Championship Horse Show.

== Life ==
Sky Watch was foaled June 14, 1977, sired by Flight Time and out of Aries Golden Gift. He was a chestnut stallion. His grandsire was Wing Commander, the first six-time five-gaited World Grand Champion. He was born on Earl Teater and Sons Farm near Lexington, Kentucky, bred by Della Large and owned by Michele MacFarlane. He retired to the Kentucky Horse Park in 1998, while he was still being bred. He was euthanized due to age-related infirmities on April 22, 2001 at the Kentucky Horse Park and is buried there near his rival Imperator.

== Career ==
Sky Watch was originally supposed to be a fine harness show horse, but he didn't take to being driven and was soon switched to under-saddle showing instead. He was initially trained by Mitch Clark, who showed Sky Watch to a win in the two-year-old five-gaited World Championship in 1979. Michele McFarlane saw the horse as a two-year-old, bought him for $50,000 and shipped him to California where he was put in training with Rob Tanner. Sky Watch won 4 five-gaited World Grand Championships, in the years 1982-84 and 1988. In 1983, he competed against another champion Saddlebred, Imperator, in a well-known duel that Sky Watch won. He won the five-gaited stallion World Grand Championship in the years 1982, 1983, 1984, 1985 and 1988. He was named the five-gaited Horse of the Century by American Saddlebred magazine.
