= Harlem Globetrotter (horse) =

- Breed: American Saddlebred
- Discipline: Five-gaited
- Sire: New Yorker
- Dam: Putting On Airs
- Sex: Stallion
- Foaled: April 28, 1980
- Color: Black
- Owner: Joan and Paul Hamilton
- Trainer: Larry Hodge

Major wins
- 9 World Championships

Harlem Globetrotter (1980–2012) was an American Saddlebred stallion who won nine World Championships and also became a successful sire. His great grand sire was champion Wing Commander.

== Life and career ==
Harlem Globetrotter was a black stallion foaled April 28, 1980. He was sired by New Yorker and out of Putting On Airs. As a two-year-old in 1981, he was purchased by Joan Hamilton and her father Paul. Although Harlem Globetrotter was originally intended to be a breeding horse, the Hamilton's put him in training with Larry Hodge, who made a successful show horse out of him, eventually winning nine World Championships in the five-gaited division. Harlem Globetrotter won one championship at age 14. After his retirement from showing, he stood at stud at Kalarama Farm in Springfield, Kentucky, where he sired over 700 foals, including 149 winners. Harlem Globetrotter died March 30, 2012, at the age of 32.

== Sire line tree ==
- Harlem Globetrotter
  - Harlem Town
    - Ninety-Eight Degrees
    - Harlems Friendly Conversation
    - Kool Time
