= National Show Horse =

American breed of horse

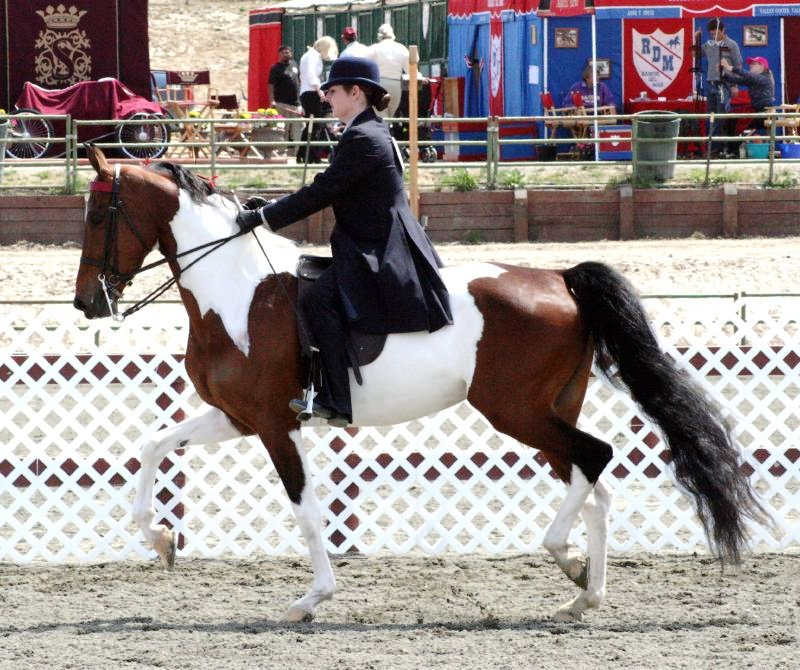
- Conservation status: DOM
- Other names: NSH
- Country of origin: United States

Traits
- Distinguishing features: high-set, swan-like neck without a pronounced crest; small, refined head, small ears; straight or concave profile; very deep, laid back shoulder; high tail carriage

Breed standards
- The National Show Horse Registry

The National Show Horse originated as a part-Arabian cross between an American Saddlebred and an Arabian horse. It is now established as a separate breed, since the founding of a breed registry in August 1981. Registered animals today may be the offspring of registered NSH parents or may be a combination between an American Saddlebred, Arabian, and a National Show Horse. Non-NSH mares and stallions must be registered with their appropriate registries, and stallions who are Arabian or Saddlebred must additionally be nominated and approved by the NSHR board of directors. Although any combination of these three breeds may be used, as of December 1, 2009 there must be at least 50% Arabian blood in the horse to be registered, up to 99% Arabian blood (formerly 25% minimum Arabian blood was required for registry).

== Breed characteristics ==
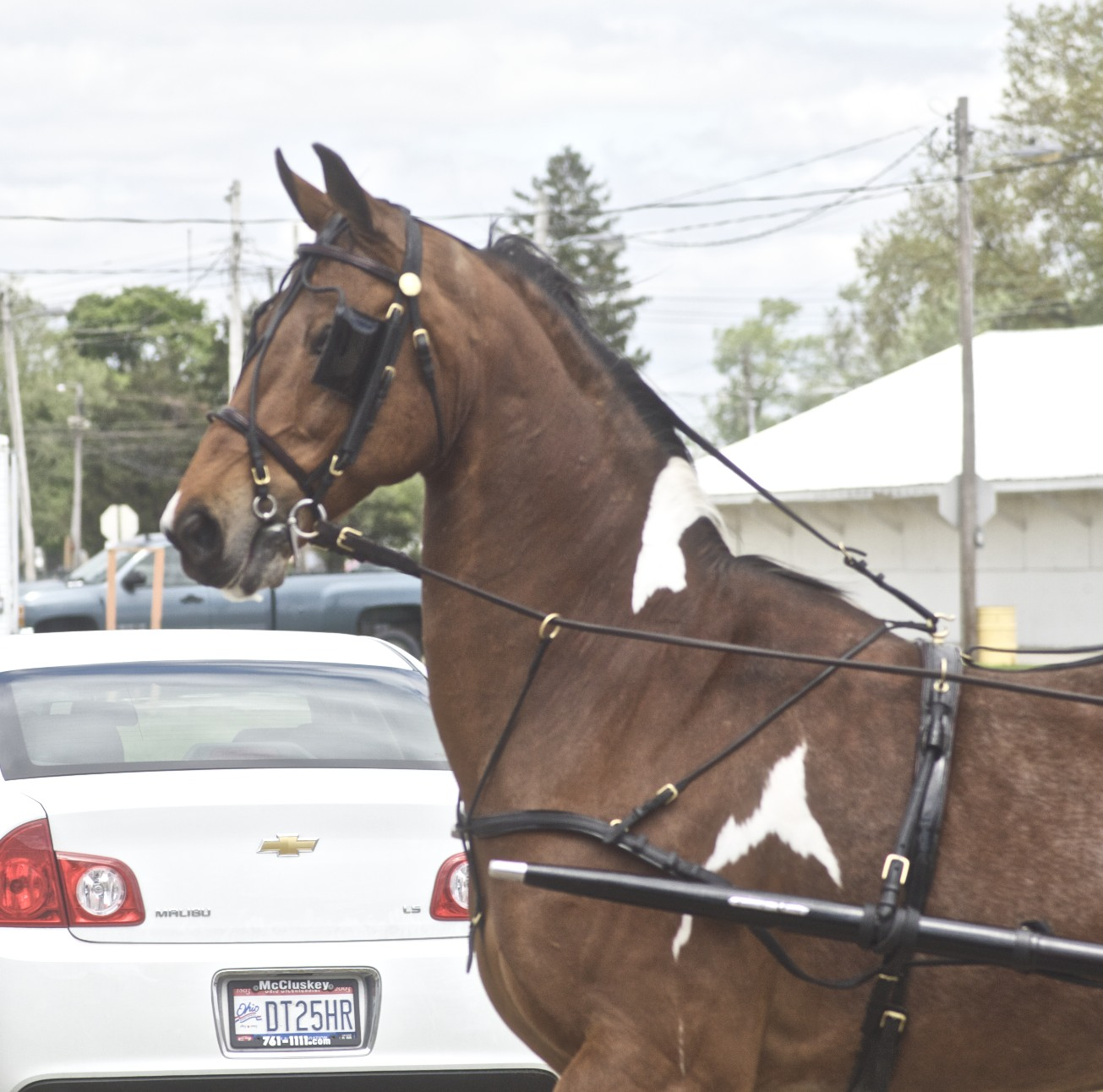
A National Show Horse in harness

The National Show Horse combines the refinement of the Arabian with the animation of the Saddlebred. The resulting horse has the high-set, upright, long, swan-like neck of the Saddlebred. The neck should not have a pronounced crest. The head is usually refined and small, with small ears and either a straight or concave profile. The horses are close-coupled with a level topline and have a very deep, laid back shoulder. The tail carriage is high. Typically, the NSH is 14.3-16.2 hands tall, with some individuals over or under.

The NSH may be a variety of colors, including the traditional bay, gray, chestnut, and black of the Arabian, with Saddlebred ancestry adding a broader range of color than seen in the Arabian breed, including, most notably, pinto and palomino.

== Uses ==
The National Show Horse is most often used for saddle seat riding. They are horses with high-stepping action and can be trained to move with a very elevated front end. Some can be trained to be five-gaited, adding the slow gait and rack to the traditional gaits of the walk, trot and canter. A versatile breed, they can also be used for show jumping, endurance, dressage, or western riding.
