= Thomas Bass (disambiguation) =

Thomas Bass (born 1951) is an American writer.

Thomas Bass may also refer to:

- Tom Bass (American football) (1936–2019), American football coach
- Tom Bass (politician) (1927–2019), American politician in Texas
- Tom Bass (sculptor) (1916–2010), Australian sculptor
- Tom Bass (horse trainer) (1859–1934), American horse trainer
- T. J. Bass (1932–2011), American author and physician
- Thomas Lee Bass (born 1962), American musician known as Tommy Lee
