= Imperator (horse) =

American Saddlebred show horse

- Breed: American Saddlebred
- Discipline: Five-gaited
- Sire: Supreme Sultan
- Dam: Empress Wing
- Maternal grandsire: Wing Commander
- Sex: Gelding
- Foaled: March 11, 1974
- Color: Dark chestnut

Major wins
- Five-Gaited World's Grand Champion: 1980, 1981, 1985, and 1986; Five-Gaited Grand Champion: 1980–1984; Five-Gaited Champion Gelding: 1979, 1980–83, 1985, 1986, 1988

Imperator (1974–1997) was an American Saddlebred show horse. He won four Five-Gaited World's Grand Championships and eight Gelding Championships at the World's Championship Horse Show, besides four five-gaited Grand Championships at the National Horse Show. He retired to the Kentucky Horse Park after the end of his show career and when he died was buried there.

== Life ==
Imperator was foaled March 11, 1974, out of Empress Wing and by Supreme Sultan. He was born on Peacock Farm in Wilmette, Illinois. His damsire (Note: In horse parlance, damsire is the correct term for maternal grandfather) was Wing Commander, the first six-time five-gaited World Grand Champion. Imperator was a dark chestnut gelding who was nicknamed "Perry". After his show career, he retired to the Kentucky Horse Park in August 1991 and died there October 20, 1997, of complications following colic surgery. He is buried at the park in the Hall of Champions.

== Career ==
Imperator won four five-gaited World Grand Championships at the World's Championship Horse Show, in 1980, 1981, 1985, and 1986; when he won it for the last time, at age 12, he became the oldest horse to win the title. He also won the five-gaited Gelding Championship at the same show in 1979, 1980–83, 1985, 1986, and 1988, setting the record for the most times an individual horse won the title. In 1983, he competed there against Sky Watch, a duel which became legendary in the Saddlebred industry and was won by Sky Watch. Imperator also won the five-gaited Grand Championship at the National Horse Show from 1980–1984. He was trained by four different trainers, and owned by several owners throughout his career. Imperator was known for having a fourteen-foot long natural tail and for being eager to show; he was also said to be excellent at the slow gait. He was never beaten in a gelding class at the World's Championship Horse Show. His lifetime earnings were approximately US $85,000, not counting silver trophies.
