= Sky Watch =

Sky Watch may refer to:

- Civil Air Support, formerly known as Sky Watch, a United Kingdom volunteer civil aviation organisation
- Sky Watch (horse), an American Saddlebred show horse
