= Tom Bass (horse trainer) =

American horse trainer (1859-1934)

- Bass riding Belle Beach
- Born: January 5, 1859; Boone County, Missouri, U.S.
- Died: November 4, 1934 (aged 75)
- Occupation: American Saddlebred trainer
- Spouse: Angie Jewell Bass

Tom Bass (January 5, 1859 – November 4, 1934) was an American Saddlebred horse trainer. Bass was born into slavery, but became one of the most popular horse trainers of the late nineteenth and early twentieth centuries. Bass trained the influential Saddlebred stallion Rex McDonald, as well as horses owned by Buffalo Bill Cody, Theodore Roosevelt, and Will Rogers.

== Life ==
Bass was born into slavery on January 5, 1859, on the Hayden plantation in Boone County, Missouri. His mother, Cornelia Gray, was a slave, and his father, William Bass, was the son of the plantation owner, Eli Bass. (Note: While Bass was born a slave, the 13th Amendment ended slavery in America) He was raised by his maternal grandparents, Presley and Eliza Grey. Bass also had a brother, named Jesse. The Bass Plantation raised and trained horses prior to the Civil War and it is believed that Tom Bass had considerable exposure to horses as a boy.

At age 20 he moved to Mexico, Missouri, where it is thought he learned the basics of the horse business from a horse buyer named Joseph A. Potts. Some time thereafter, he began a horse training operation.

In 1882, Bass married a schoolteacher, Angie Jewell. In 1897 the couple had a son, Inman.

== Career ==
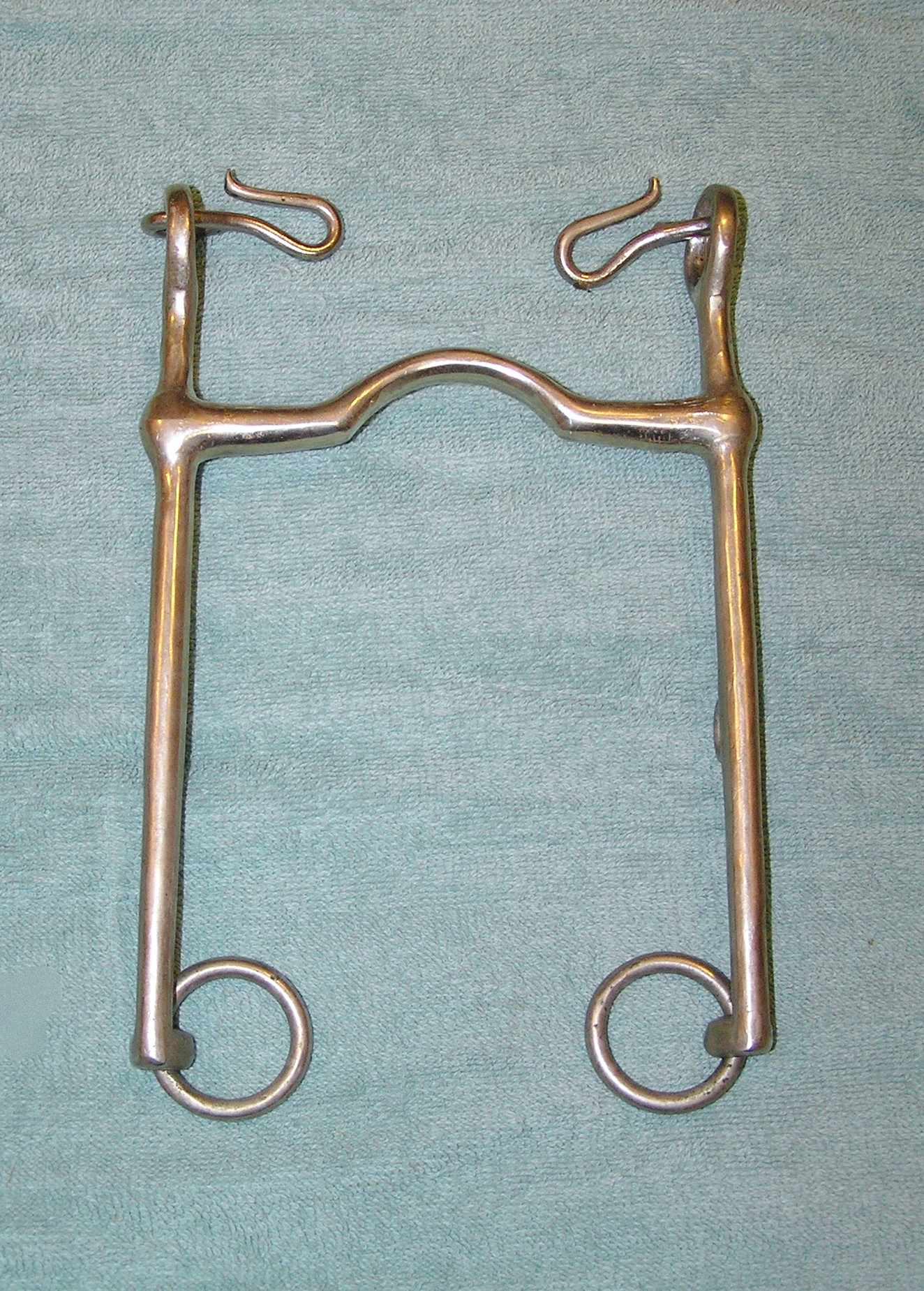
A modern version of the Tom Bass bit design

Bass quickly developed a reputation for gentle training methods and drew a clientele came from a wide area. He was reputed to have said, "Horses are like humans." Bass trained the influential five-gaited Saddlebred stallion Rex McDonald. He trained horses for notable people including Anheuser-Busch executives Adolphus and August Busch, Buffalo Bill Cody, Will Rogers, and President Theodore Roosevelt. He also started the Tom Bass Riding Club. Celebrity guests to his farm included William Jennings Bryan, President William McKinley, and circus magnate P.T. Barnum

In 1892, Bass and his wife moved to Kansas City, Missouri to open a livery stable and eventually helped start the American Royal Horse Show, one of the three jewels of the Saddlebred Triple Crown. He was the first African-American to exhibit a horse at the American Royal. In 1893, Bass showed horses at the World's Columbian Exposition in Chicago and won respect for his riding ability, besides winning the World Championship on the Saddlebred mare Miss Rex. Bass later moved back to Mexico, Missouri, and continued training horses. In 1917, it was estimated that over one million people had seen him perform with his horses. He was credited with making Mexico, Missouri the "Saddle Horse Capital of the World."

Besides Rex McDonald and other Saddlebreds, Bass trained the notable high school horse Belle Beach, who could bow, curtsy and dance. He invented a curb bit called the Tom Bass bit, which was designed to give the rider control without causing pain to the horse, but never patented it. The Bass bit is still in use. For his contributions to the state of Missouri, Bass was posthumously inducted into the Hall of Famous Missourians in 1999, becoming the twentieth person so honored. Bass also has exhibits in the American Saddlebred Museum in Mexico, and the American Royal Museum in Kansas City.

== Death and legacy ==
Bass died of a heart attack on November 20, 1934, at the age of 75. His friends believed that grief from the recent death of Belle Beach, one of his best horses, contributed to his death. Bass is buried in the Elmwood Cemetery in Mexico, Missouri. His tombstone reads, "One of the World's Greatest Saddle Horse Trainers and Riders." Upon Bass's death, Will Rogers devoted an entire newspaper column to him, saying in part, "Tom Bass...aged 75, died today. Don't mean much to you, does it? You have all seen society folk perform on a beautiful three- or five-gaited horse and said, 'My, what skill and patience they must have had to train that animal.' Well, all they did was ride him. All Tom Bass did was train him. He trained thousands of horses that others were applauded on."

His barn became a historic landmark in the area, and stood until it was burned by a 19-year-old arsonist on August 28, 1997.
