= Vernon Baker =

United States Army Medal of Honor recipient (1919–2010)

Vernon Joseph Baker
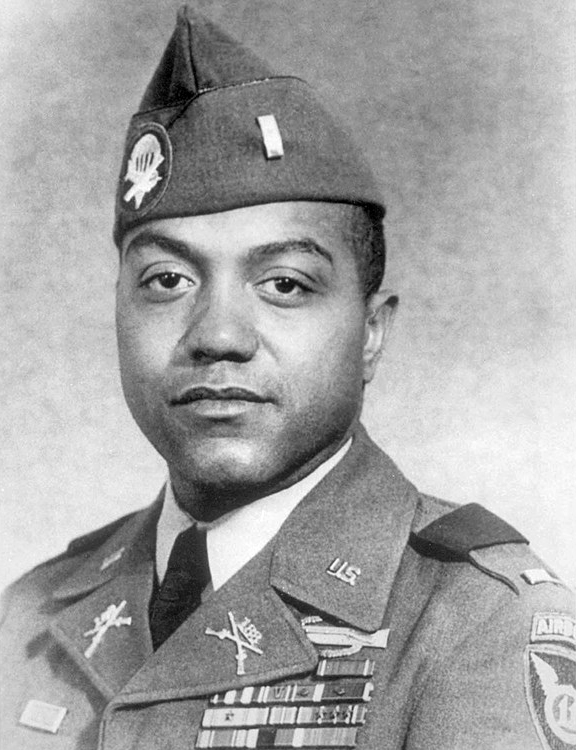
- Vernon Baker after World War II
- Born: December 17, 1919; Cheyenne, Wyoming, US
- Died: July 13, 2010 (aged 90); St. Maries, Idaho, US
- Burial place: Arlington National Cemetery
- Military career
- Allegiance: United States
- Branch: United States Army
- Service years: 1941–1968
- Rank: First Lieutenant
- Units: C Company, 1st Battalion, 370th Infantry Regiment, 92nd Infantry Division; 11th Airborne Division
- Conflicts: World War II: Italian Campaign (WIA); Korean War
- Awards: Medal of Honor; Silver Star; Bronze Star Medal (2) with "V" Device; Purple Heart (2); War Cross of Military Valor (Italy)

Vernon Joseph Baker (December 17, 1919 – July 13, 2010) was a United States Army first lieutenant who was an infantry company platoon leader during World War II and a paratrooper during the Korean War. In 1997, he was awarded the Medal of Honor, the nation's highest military decoration for valor, for his actions on April 5–6, 1945, near Viareggio, Italy.

Baker and six other Black Americans who served in World War II were formally awarded the Medal of Honor on January 12, 1997. A day later, Baker (the only living recipient) and representatives for the six other men were given the awards by President Bill Clinton at a ceremony in the White House in Washington, D.C. The seven recipients were the first (and only) Black Americans to be awarded the Medal of Honor for World War II. Baker died in 2010 at the age of 90 and was interred at Arlington National Cemetery, in Arlington, Virginia.

== Early life ==
Baker was born on December 17, 1919, in Cheyenne, Wyoming, the youngest of three children. After his parents died in a car accident when he was four, he and his two sisters were raised by their paternal grandparents. His grandfather Joseph S. Baker, a railroad worker in Cheyenne, taught him to hunt in order to feed the family and became "the most influential figure in Vernon's life." His relationship with his wheelchair-using grandmother was much more strained, and he spent a few years at the Boys Town orphanage in Omaha, Nebraska, to be away from her. Baker graduated in 1939 from Clarinda High School in his grandfather's hometown of Clarinda, Iowa. He worked as a railroad porter, a job he despised, until his grandfather's death from cancer on Christmas in 1939. A series of menial jobs followed.

== U.S. Army career ==
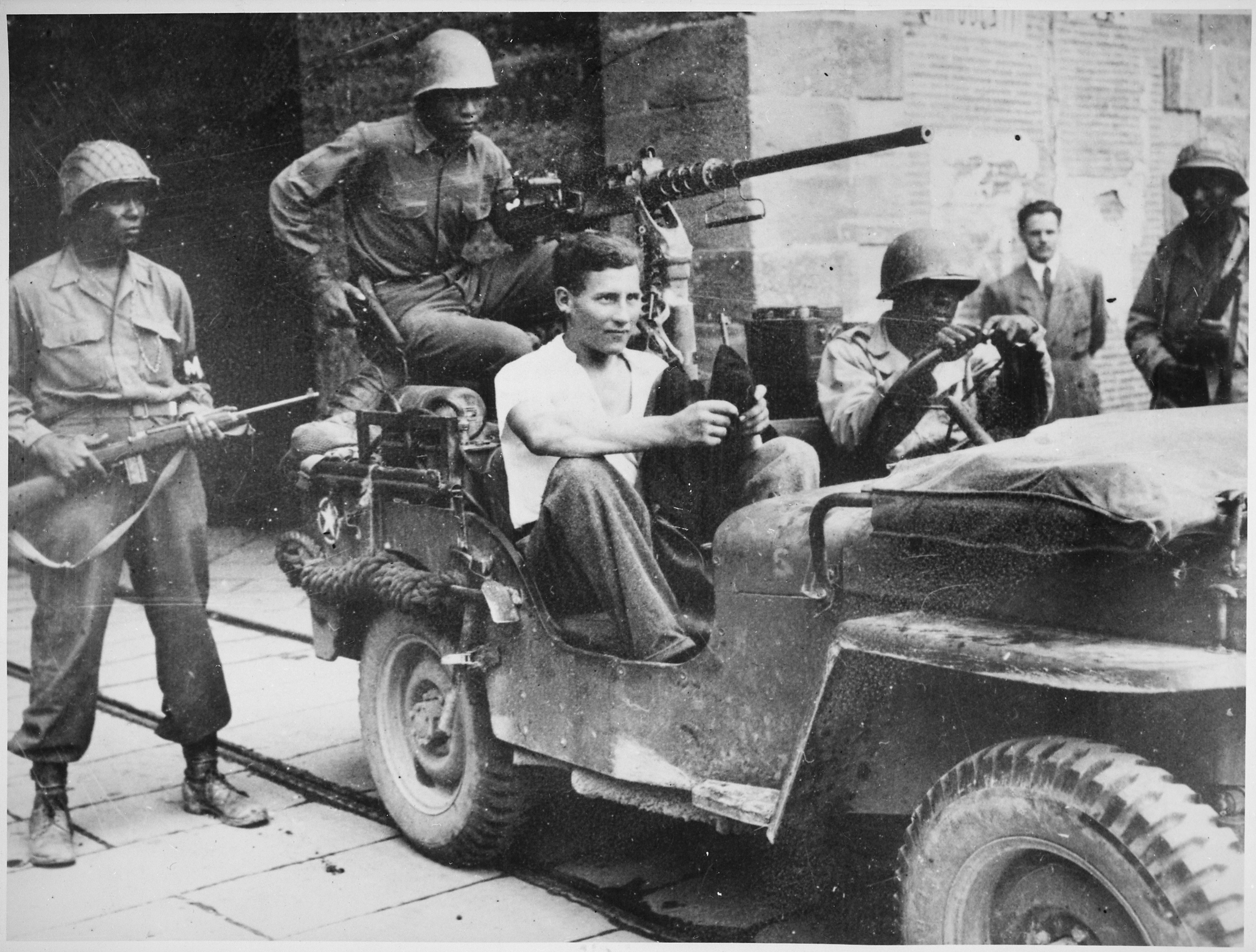
Soldiers of the 92nd Infantry Division with a captured German soldier (1944)

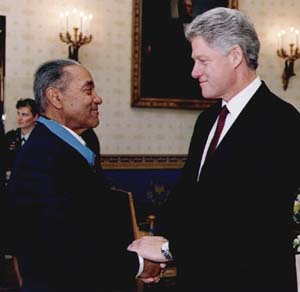
Vernon Baker is presented the Medal of Honor by President Bill Clinton on January 13, 1997.

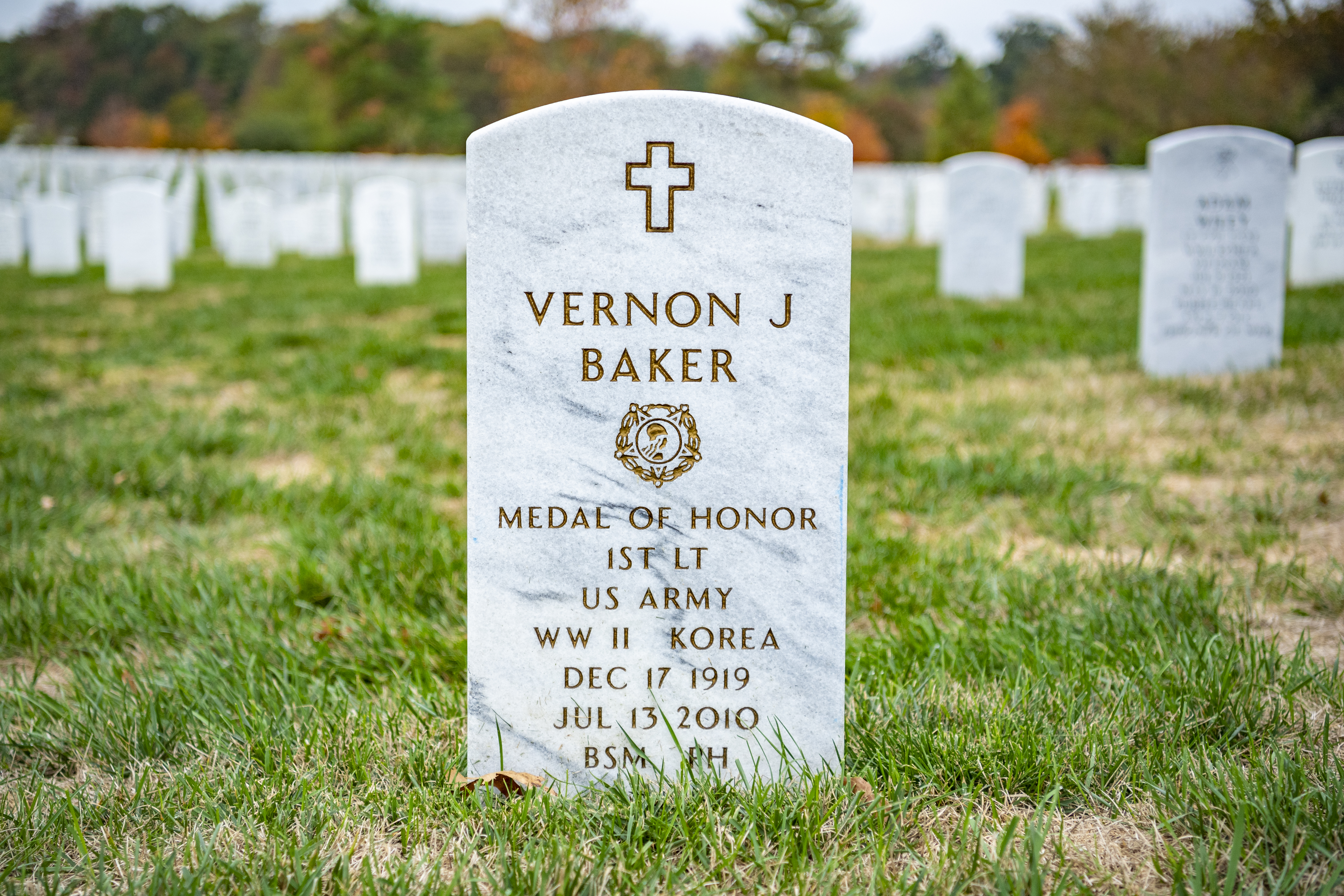
Grave at Arlington National Cemetery

Baker enlisted in the U.S. Army in June 1941 from Cheyenne. He had attempted to enlist in April, but was turned away with the recruiter stating, "We don't have any quotas for you people". Baker tried again weeks later with a different recruiter and was accepted; he requested to become a quartermaster but was given instead the infantry. After basic training at Camp Wolters in Texas, he was assigned to the 1st Battalion, 370th Infantry Regiment, 92nd Infantry Division. He completed Officer Candidate School and was commissioned a second lieutenant on January 11, 1943. In June 1944, the 370th Infantry landed in Naples, Italy. Soon afterwards, Baker was wounded in the arm and hospitalized for two months. In the spring of 1945, Baker was in command of Weapons Platoon, C Company, 1st Battalion, 370th Infantry. On April 5, his unit was ordered to assault a German-occupied mountain stronghold, Castle Aghinolfi. In doing so, Baker personally eliminated three enemy machineguns, an observation post, and a dugout. 19 of the 25 men in Baker's platoon were killed. On the second day of the assault, Baker volunteered to lead a battalion advance that secured the mountain. On June 10, he was awarded the Distinguished Service Cross for extraordinary heroism on April 5–6. After World War II, he became an Army parachutist in the 11th Airborne Division and served in the Korean War. He retired from the Army in 1968.

=== Medal of Honor ===
In the early 1990s, it was determined Black soldiers were denied consideration for the Medal of Honor (MOH) in World War II because of their race. In 1993, the U.S. Army had contracted Shaw University in Raleigh, North Carolina, to research and determine if there was racial disparity in the review process for recipients of the MOH. The study commissioned by the U.S. Army, described systematic racial discrimination in the criteria for awarding decorations during World War II. After an exhaustive review of files, the study recommended in 1996 where ten Black Americans who served in World War II should be awarded the MOH. In October of that year, Congress passed legislation which would allow President Clinton to award the Medal of Honor to these former soldiers. Seven of the ten, including Baker, were approved, and awarded the MOH (six had Distinguished Service Crosses revoked and upgraded to the MOH), on January 12, 1997. On January 13, 1997, President Clinton presented the MOH to Baker, age 77, and posthumously presented the MOH to the other six Black Americans.

== Family and later years ==
Baker worked for the American Red Cross for almost 20 years. His first and second wives were Leola and Helen Baker. His second wife, born Helen Conley Stewart, was the granddaughter of Paschal Conley and niece of Congressman Bennett Stewart.

His third wife was Fern Brown; the couple had three children. After Fern's death in 1986, Baker moved to a cabin in the Benewah Valley of northern Idaho. Baker was an avid hunter, and hunted elk in northern Idaho before and after moving to the area. In 1989, he met a German woman visiting the U.S., Heidy Pawlik, whom he would later marry.

Baker died at his St. Maries, Idaho, home on July 13, 2010, after a long battle with cancer. He had been close to death from brain cancer in 2004 but had recovered. His funeral at Arlington National Cemetery near Washington, DC, on September 24, 2010, was attended by three other Medal of Honor recipients, and his family. Funds for them to travel to Arlington, Virginia, were raised by their local community.

== Military awards ==
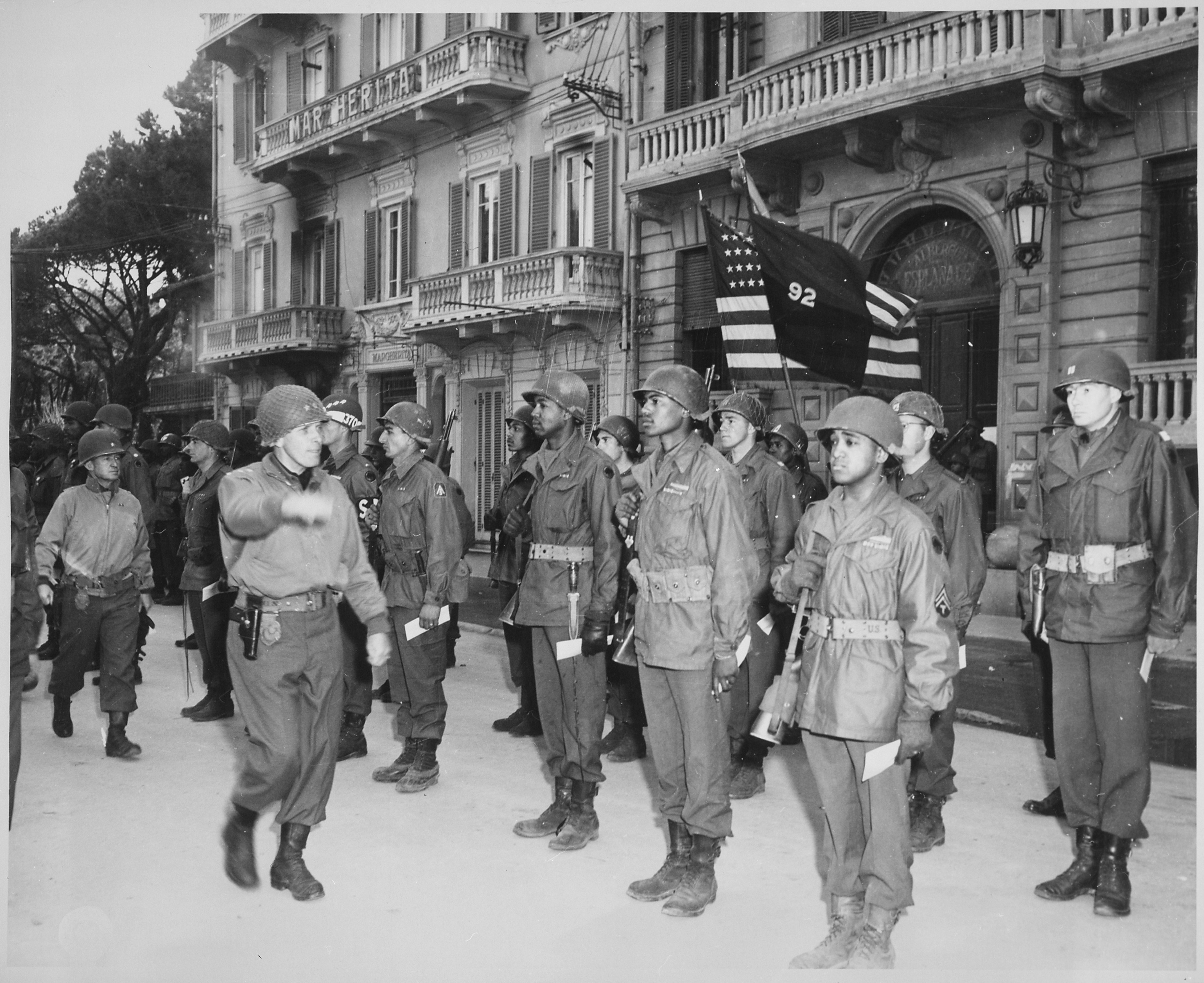
Major General Edward Almond, Commanding General of the 92nd Infantry Division, inspects his troops during a decoration ceremony, March 1945.

Baker's military decorations and awards:

| Badge | Combat Infantryman Badge | | |
| 1st row | Medal of Honor (upgraded from the Distinguished Service Cross) | | |
| 2nd row | Silver Star | Bronze Star Medal with "V" device and 1 Oak leaf cluster | Purple Heart with 1 Oak leaf cluster |
| 3rd row | American Defense Service Medal | American Campaign Medal | European-African-Middle Eastern Campaign Medal with 3 Campaign stars |
| 4th row | World War II Victory Medal | Army of Occupation Medal | National Defense Service Medal with 1 Service star |
| Badge | Parachutist Badge | | |
| Unit awards | Army Presidential Unit Citation | | |
| Foreign Award | Croce Al Valor Militare (Italian War Cross) | | Polish Cross of Valor |

== Medal of Honor citation ==
Baker's Medal of Honor citation reads:

The President of the United States in the name of The Congress takes pleasure in presenting the Medal of Honor to

First Lieutenant Vernon J. Baker
UNITED STATES ARMY

Citation:

For conspicuous gallantry and intrepidity at the risk of his life above and beyond the call of duty: First Lieutenant Vernon J. Baker distinguished himself by extraordinary heroism in action on 5 and 6 April 1945. At 0500 hours on 5 April 1945, Lieutenant Baker advanced at the head of his weapons platoon, along with Company C's three rifle platoons, towards their objective, Castle Aghinolfi – a German mountain strong point on the high ground just east of the coastal highway and about two miles from the 370th Infantry Regiment's line of departure. Moving more rapidly than the rest of the company, Lieutenant Baker and about 25 men reached the south side of a draw some 250 yards from the castle within two hours. In reconnoitering for a suitable position to set up a machine gun, Lieutenant Baker observed two cylindrical objects pointing out a slit in a mount at the edge of a hill. Crawling up and under the opening, he stuck his M-1 into the slit and emptied the clip, killing the observation post's two occupants. Moving to another position in the same area, Lieutenant Baker stumbled upon a well-camouflaged machine gun nest, the crew of which was eating breakfast. He shot and killed both enemy soldiers. After Captain John F. Runyon, Company C's Commander joined the group, a German soldier appeared from the draw and hurled a grenade which failed to explode. Lieutenant Baker shot the enemy soldier twice as he tried to flee. Lieutenant Baker then went down into the draw alone. There he blasted open the concealed entrance of another dugout with a hand grenade, shot one German soldier who emerged after the explosion, tossed another grenade into the dugout and entered firing his sub-machine gun killing two more Germans. As Lieutenant Baker climbed back out of the draw, enemy machine gun and mortar fire began to inflict heavy casualties among the group of 25 soldiers, killing or wounding about two-thirds of them. When expected reinforcements did not arrive, Captain Runyon ordered a withdrawal in two groups. Lieutenant Baker volunteered to cover the withdrawal of the first group, which consisted mostly of walking wounded, and to remain to assist in the evacuation of the more seriously wounded. During the second group's withdrawal, Lieutenant Baker, supported by covering fire from one of the platoon members, destroyed two machine gun positions (previously bypassed during the assault) with hand grenades. In all, Lieutenant Baker accounted for nine enemy dead soldiers, elimination of three machine gun positions, an observation post, and a dugout. On the following night, Lieutenant Baker voluntarily led a battalion advance through enemy mine fields and heavy fire toward the division objective. Lieutenant Baker's fighting spirit and daring leadership were an inspiration to his men and exemplify the highest traditions of the military service.

/S/ Bill Clinton

== Other honors ==
On September 11, 2008, Vernon Baker was awarded the Sandor Teszler Award for Moral Courage and Service to Humankind by Wofford College in Spartanburg, South Carolina. Along with the award, Baker received an honorary doctorate from the college.

Vernon J. Baker Medal of Honor Main Street (3 blocks) in Clarinda, Iowa, was named after him in 2006.

== See also ==
- Edward A. Carter Jr.
- John R. Fox
- Willy F. James Jr.
- Ruben Rivers
- Charles L. Thomas
- George Watson
- List of Medal of Honor recipients for World War II
- List of African-American Medal of Honor recipients
