= Earl Teater =

American horse trainer

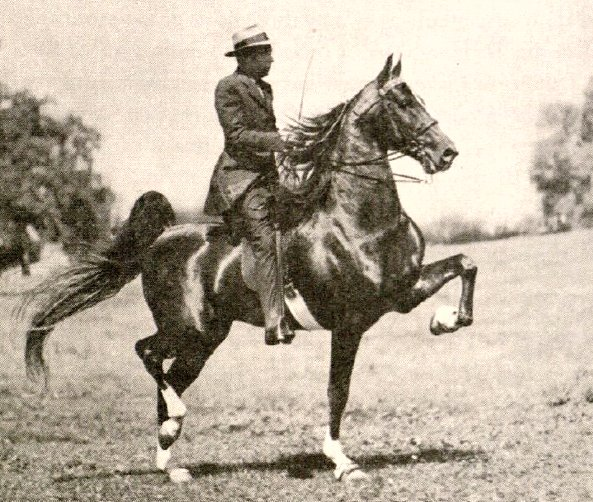
- Discipline: Saddle seat
- Born: 1905/1906; Harrodsburg, Kentucky
- Died: 1972
- Major wins/Championships: Five-Gaited World's Grand Championship, 1948, 1949, 1950, 1951, 1952, 1953; Five-Gaited World's Grand Championship in 1956

Honors
- Inducted into UPHA Hall of Fame

Significant horses
- Wing Commander, Dream Waltz.

Earl Teater (1905/6–1972) was an American Saddlebred horse trainer. He was best known for showing the stallion Wing Commander to six World's Grand Championships, and he later won another World's Grand Championship on Dream Waltz.

== Life and career ==
Teater was born in Harrodsburg, Kentucky in 1905/1906.

In 1943 Teater moved to Brentwood, Tennessee to be the trainer for Maryland Farm. In 1945 he returned to Kentucky and became trainer for Dodge Stables, part of Castleton Farm. Teater was best known for training the chestnut stallion Wing Commander. In 1948 he entered Wing Commander in the World's Championship Horse Show for the first time. The two won the five-gaited World's Grand Championship that year and every year through 1953, making them the first six-time winners. Teater also trained the five-gaited horse Waltz Dream, who won the World's Grand Championship in 1956. Teater's son Ed ran the Tattersall Sale, an auction for all ages and disciplines of Saddlebreds, and was later the president of Teater American Saddlebred Enterprises. Earl Teater died May 19, 1972, of cancer. He was 67 years old and his obituary ran in The New York Times. He was inducted into the United Professional Horsemens Association Hall of Fame.
