= Kentucky State Fair World's Championship Horse Show =

World's Championship Horse Show
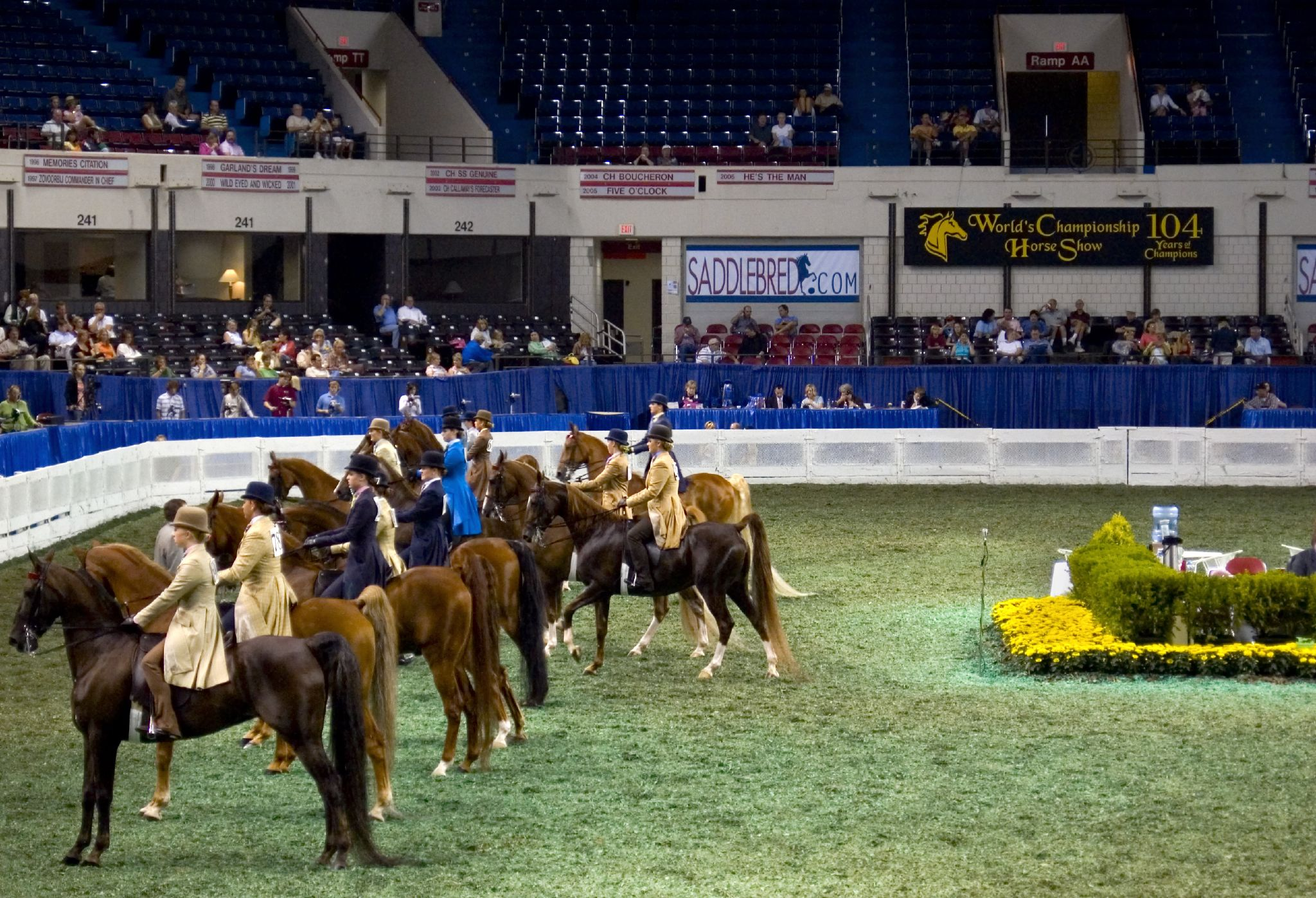
- A class of American Saddlebreds and riders at the World's Championship Horse Show
- Sanctioning body: American Saddlebred Horse Association
- Second sanctioning body: United States Equestrian Federation
- Location: Freedom Hall, Kentucky Exposition Center; Louisville, Kentucky
- Held: Annually
- Inaugurated: 1902
- Largest honor: World's Grand Championship
- Divisions: Five-gaited, three-gaited, fine harness, road horse, road pony, harness pony
- Website: wchorseshow.com

The World's Championship Horse Show, held at the Kentucky State Fairgrounds in Louisville, Kentucky, in Freedom Hall, is a large horse show that includes the American Saddlebred, Hackney pony, Dutch Harness Horse, and Standardbred breeds. It is usually held annually in late August, coinciding with the dates of the Kentucky State Fair and in the middle of the show season for the three breeds. Any horse or rider who wins there earns the title of World's Champion (abbreviation: WC), and a second-place finish is identified with a Reserve World's Championship (abbreviation: RWC) title. In addition to the WC and RWC titles, a horse can also earn the World's Grand Championship (WGC) or World's Championship of Champions (WCC) title. The winner of a championship class which requires a qualifier is given one of these titles.

== Competition ==
American Saddlebred horses, Hackney ponies and horses, and Standardbred horses compete in the World's Championship. In each division, there are always several classes specifically for amateurs, ladies, amateur ladies, and junior exhibitors. There are also specific age classes for younger horses, namely two- three- and four-year-olds, and for Saddlebred ponies and horses.

The Saddlebred divisions of the show's classes contain about six to thirty classes each, and the number may depend on the number of entries that will be showing, since larger classes are usually split into two separate sections. Saddlebreds compete in the divisions found in most of their shows, including the three performance divisions, five-gaited, three gaited, and fine harness, as well as park and pleasure divisions. Saddle seat equitation classes are also offered for junior riders.

The Hackney ponies compete in four divisions, road, Hackney (cobtail), harness, and pleasure driving. Standardbreds are shown in only one division, road horses.

Multiple World's Championship titles are awarded, but there is only one World's Grand Championship in each division. The most prestigious World's Grand Championship is for five-gaited Saddlebreds, meaning horses that perform the standard gaits of walk, trot, and canter plus two four-beat gaits, the slow gait and the rack. Saddlebreds in the Three-Gaited World's Grand Championship compete at the walk, trot and canter, but are still judged on their breed type and animation.

== History ==
The World's Championship Horse Show has been held every year since it was founded in 1902 with only two exceptions. The first missed year was 1904, when no fair was held, and 1945, when the fair was cancelled due to World War II. The World's Grand Championships were first held in a modern sense in 1914. It is one of the three horse shows that compose the Saddlebred "Triple Crown," in addition to the Lexington Junior League Horse Show in Lexington, Kentucky, and the American Royal in Kansas City, Missouri. The schedule always ends on a Saturday night with the Five-Gaited World's Grand Championship, which carries prize money of $100,000.

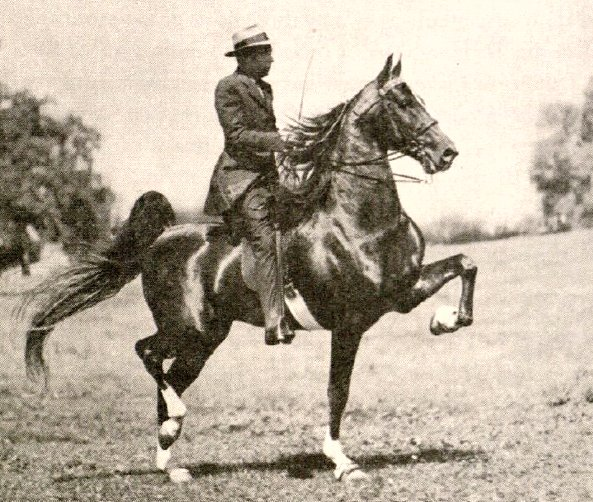
Wing Commander, six-time winner of the Five-Gaited World's Grand Championship

In 1953, the stallion Wing Commander, trained by Earl Teater became the first Saddlebred to ever win six World's Grand Championship titles, all in the five-gaited division. After him, a mare named My-My matched his feat from 1963 to 1968, but she died before she could win a seventh title. More recently, a fine harness horse named Callaway's Copyright won his sixth World's Grand Championship in 2006 and retired shortly thereafter. In 1988, Michele MacFarlane became the first woman to win the Five-Gaited World's Grand Championship on Sky Watch. Since then, she has had two more wins of the same title, on two different horses in 1996 and 2007. The latter year was also notable, for another amateur woman, Mary Gaylord McClean, won the reserve title to MacFarlane. Some other horses that have made recent history with their performances are An Heir About Her, who became the first three-year-old Saddlebred to win a World's Grand Championship in 2002, and A Sweet Treat and HS Daydream's Heads Up, who won World's Grand Championships in both the three-gaited and fine harness divisions, which is particularly unusual and proves a horse's versatility.

In 2006, the Kentucky State Fair offered a western pleasure division for Saddlebreds and the hunt seat pleasure division was introduced in 2019. It also has begun offering futurity and junior park pleasure classes and a junior exhibitor park division.

== See also ==
- List of attractions and events in the Louisville metropolitan area
