= Roadster (horse) =

Horse and pony driving competition

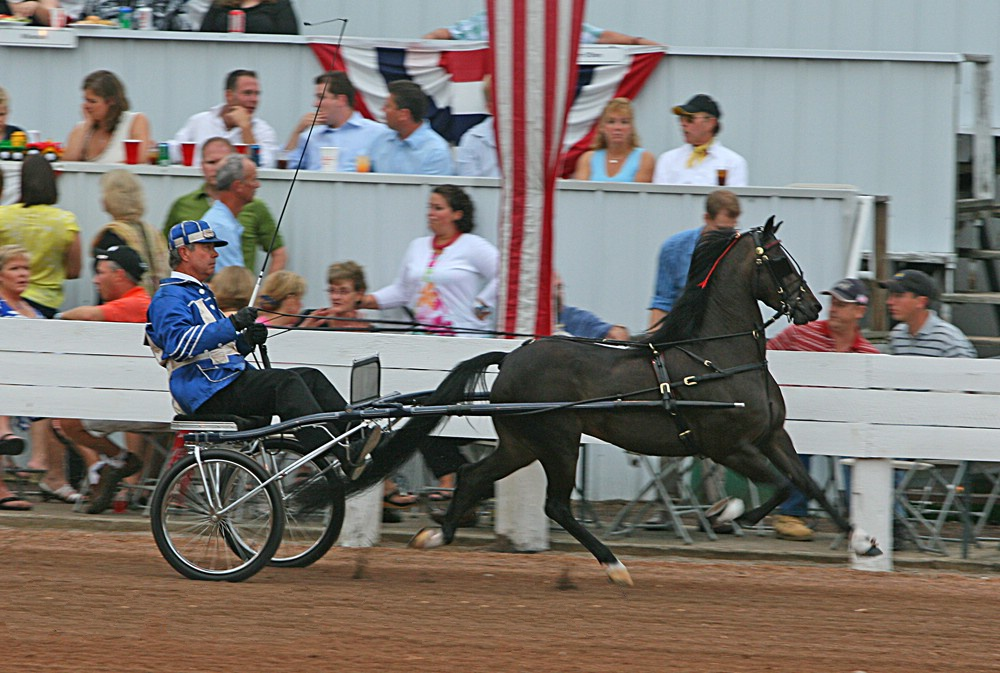
A competitor in a roadster show class

Roadster is a type of driving competition for horses and ponies where the horse and exhibitor appear in equipment similar to that used in harness racing. It is derived from the historical use of certain horses hitched to light carts that traveled quickly from one place to another, often racing on ordinary dirt roads, hence the name. The term is also used to describe the horse used for such competition. Horses pull a light sulky and drivers wear racing silks. However, the exhibitors do not race. Instead, they perform in an arena at horse shows at trotting gaits that include a slow jog, a medium speed "road gait," and a rapid and long-strided but controlled trot referred to as showing "at speed." Animals are evaluated on performance and manners.
