= Paschal Conley =

American soldier

- Born: 1858; Madison County, Alabama, US
- Died: March 12, 1919 (aged 60–61); Spokane County, Washington, US
- Burial place: Havre, Hill County, Montana, US
- Military career
- Allegiance: United States of America
- Rank: Second Lieutenant
- Unit: 10th Cavalry Regiment
- Conflicts: Spanish–American War

Paschal Conley (1858-1919) was a Second Lieutenant in the United States Army, Buffalo Soldier, and served as Quartermaster Sergeant Troop M, 10th Cavalry Regiment, during the Spanish–American War.

Conley was recognized by The Secretary of the Army, John McHugh, and U.S. Sen. Jeff Sessions (R-AL), a senior member of the Senate Armed Services Committee and Ranking Member of the Strategic Forces Subcommittee, who agreed with Sgt. Conley's posthumous promotion in 2012.

== Military career ==
Paschal Conley enlisted in 1892, as was assigned to Holguin Cuba Military base, as a member of the 10th Cavalry, "M" Troop commanded by 1st Sergeant Louis Smith. The 10th was one of the Colored Cavalry Regiments that protected Theodore Roosevelt's Rough Riders near Santiago, Cuba in 1898. Theodore Roosevelt said of the Tenth Cavalry "...brave men worthy of respect, I don't think any Rough Rider will ever forget the tie that binds us to the Tenth Cavalry."

Paschal Conley was initially a regimental clerk of the 24th Infantry at Fort Supply, east of present-day Fort Supply, Oklahoma. He encouraged the black soldiers to read and stay abreast of the news of the day. Due to Conley's efforts, The Huntsville Gazette became the first black newspaper subscribed to by a military base, according to military historians William A. Dobak and Thomas D. Phillips.

He was mentored by General Pershing, one of only two Americans to be named General of the Armies. Pershing fought tirelessly for Conley's proper recognition in an era when mixed race soldiers were often insufficiently recognized. With Pershing's support, Conley advanced rapidly, serving in New Mexico, North Dakota and Wyoming, in addition to Montana.

Throughout his career, Conley continued to urge reading among the Buffalo Soldiers, and he encouraged athletics as a way of keeping the troops fit and engaged. The 10th formed a close, and almost familial, bond. Nurse Sallie Conley, sister of Quartermaster Sergeant Paschal Conley, married another soldier in the regiment, Beverly Thornton, in one of the many examples of interlocking relations in the regiment.

== Later life ==
Upon his retirement, Conley became a prominent member of the Havre, Montana community, acquiring real estate throughout the town. He built four homes in the town, which are a part of the Havre Residential Historic District and listed on the National Register of Historic Places.

He and his wife, Mary Jones Conley, would have four children, Matty L. (b. 1890); Charles H. (b. 1891); Edward J. (b. 1893) and Paschal L. (1894–1917). His son, Edward J. Conley, would also become very active in real estate, and serve as notary to land leases in the Crow Agency region of Montana.

Paschal Conley died in Spokane, Washington on March 12, 1919, but was buried in Havre, Montana on March 15 in Highland Cemetery.
