= American Saddlebred Horse and Breeders Association =

Horse breed registry

- Location within Kentucky American Saddlebred Horse and Breeders Association (the United States)
- Abbreviation: ASHBA
- Predecessor: American Saddle Horse Breeders' Association; American Saddlebred Horse Association
- Formation: 1891; 135 years ago
- Purpose: Registration of American Saddlebreds
- Location: 4083 Iron Works Parkway, Suite 2, Lexington, KY 40511
- Coordinates: 38.14971380050803°N 84.51772478955196°W
- Services: Registration, membership
- Website: saddlebred.com

The American Saddlebred Horse and Breeders Association (abbreviated ASHBA) is a breed registry for the American Saddlebred horse. Founded in 1891, it is headquartered at the Kentucky Horse Park in Lexington, Kentucky.

== History ==
The American Saddle Horse Breeders' Association was formed in Louisville, Kentucky in 1891 with General John B. Castleman as the first president. At the time, all horses had to perform five gaits or be traceable to recognized bloodlines in order to be issued registration papers.

In 1980 the name was changed to American Saddlebred Horse Association (ASHA), and in 1985 the association moved to the Kentucky Horse Park in Lexington. In 2021, ASHA merged with the American Saddlebred Registry to become American Saddlebred Horse and Breeders Association, Inc. (ASHBA).

== Registration ==
As of 2023, the association has about 7,000 members, and registers around 1,300 horses each year. All horses registered with ASHBA are pure or half-bred American Saddlebreds.

== Competition ==
Most Saddlebred shows are held through the United States Equestrian Federation (USEF).
