= Lexington Junior League Horse Show =

- Location: Lexington, Kentucky: The Red Mile (1937-2017); Rolex Stadium (2018-)
- Held: Annually, July
- Length: One week
- Inaugurated: 1937
- Breeds shown: American Saddlebreds
- Largest honor: Five-gaited stake
- Total purse: $70,000
- Number of entries: 1,000

The Lexington Junior League Horse Show is an annual horse show held in Lexington, Kentucky. It was founded in 1937.

== History ==
The Lexington Junior League Horse Show was begun in 1937 by Marie Kittrell as a way to make money for charity. The first show was held at The Red Mile, a harness racing track, because it only cost US$1 (equivalent to $21.87 in 2024) to rent the venue. It attracted 216 horses and 24,000 spectators.

The show was held at The Red Mile through 2017. In 2018, it moved to Rolex Stadium at the Kentucky Horse Park, also located in Lexington.

== Competition ==
The show is the first of the three jewels of the Saddlebred Triple Crown. It is held annually at The Red Mile Harness Track, and has been every year since its inception. It is the largest outdoor Saddlebred show in the world and draws approximately 1,000 exhibitors. The total prize money offered exceeds $70,000.
