= American Saddlebred =

American horse breed

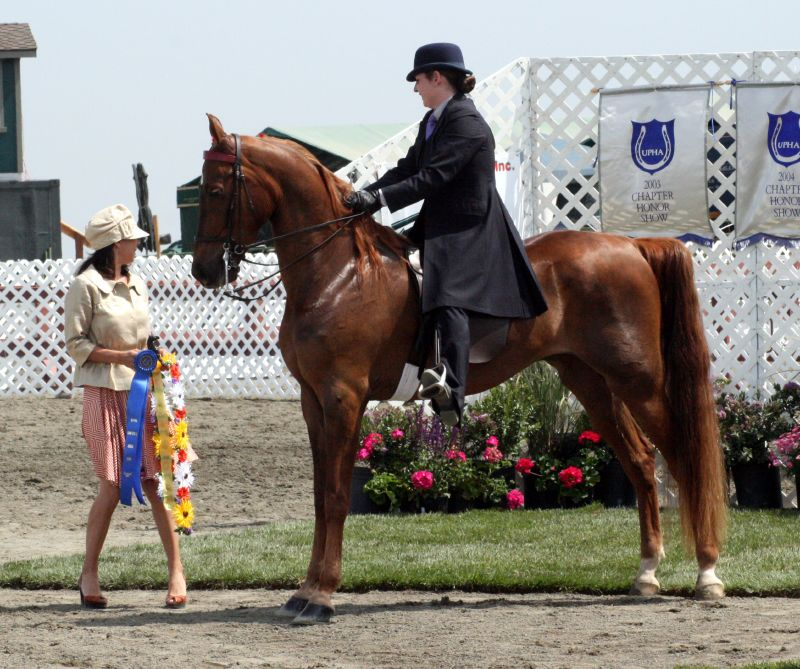
- An American Saddlebred and rider in saddle seat tack and attire.
- Other names: Saddlebred, American Saddle Horse, American Saddler
- Country of origin: United States

Traits
- Weight: 900 to 1,000 lb (410 to 450 kg)
- Height: 15 to 16 hands (60 to 64 inches, 152 to 163 cm)
- Color: Any color permissible
- Distinguishing features: High stepping with exaggerated action

Breed standards
- American Saddlebred Horse Association

The American Saddlebred is a horse breed from the United States. Descended from riding-type horses bred at the time of the American Revolution, the American Saddlebred includes the Narragansett Pacer, Canadian Pacer, Morgan and Thoroughbred among its ancestors. Developed into its modern type in Kentucky, it was once known as the "Kentucky Saddler", and used extensively as an officer's mount in the American Civil War. In 1891, a breed registry was formed in the United States. Throughout the 20th century, the breed's popularity continued to grow in the United States, and exports began to South Africa and Great Britain. Since the formation of the US registry, almost 250,000 American Saddlebreds have been registered, and can now be found around the world, with separate breed registries established in Great Britain, Australia, continental Europe, and southern Africa.

Averaging 15 to 16 hands (60 to 64 inches, 152 to 163 cm) in height, Saddlebreds are known for their sense of presence and style, as well as for their spirited, yet gentle, temperament. They may be of any color, including pinto patterns, which have been acknowledged in the breed since the late 1800s. They are considered a gaited breed, as some Saddlebreds are bred and trained to perform four-beat ambling gaits, one being a "slow gait" that historically was one of three possible ambling patterns, and the much faster rack.

Since the mid-1800s, the breed has played a prominent part in the US horse show industry, and is called the "peacock of the horse world". They have attracted the attention of numerous celebrities, who have become breeders and exhibitors, and purebred and partbred American Saddlebreds have appeared in several films, especially during the Golden Age of Hollywood. Saddlebreds are mainly known for their performance in the show ring, but can also be seen in competition in several other English riding disciplines and combined driving, as well as being used as a pleasure riding horse. American Saddlebreds often compete in five primary divisions: Five-Gaited, Three-Gaited, Fine Harness, Park and Pleasure. In these divisions they are judged on performance, manners, presence, quality and conformation.

== Characteristics ==
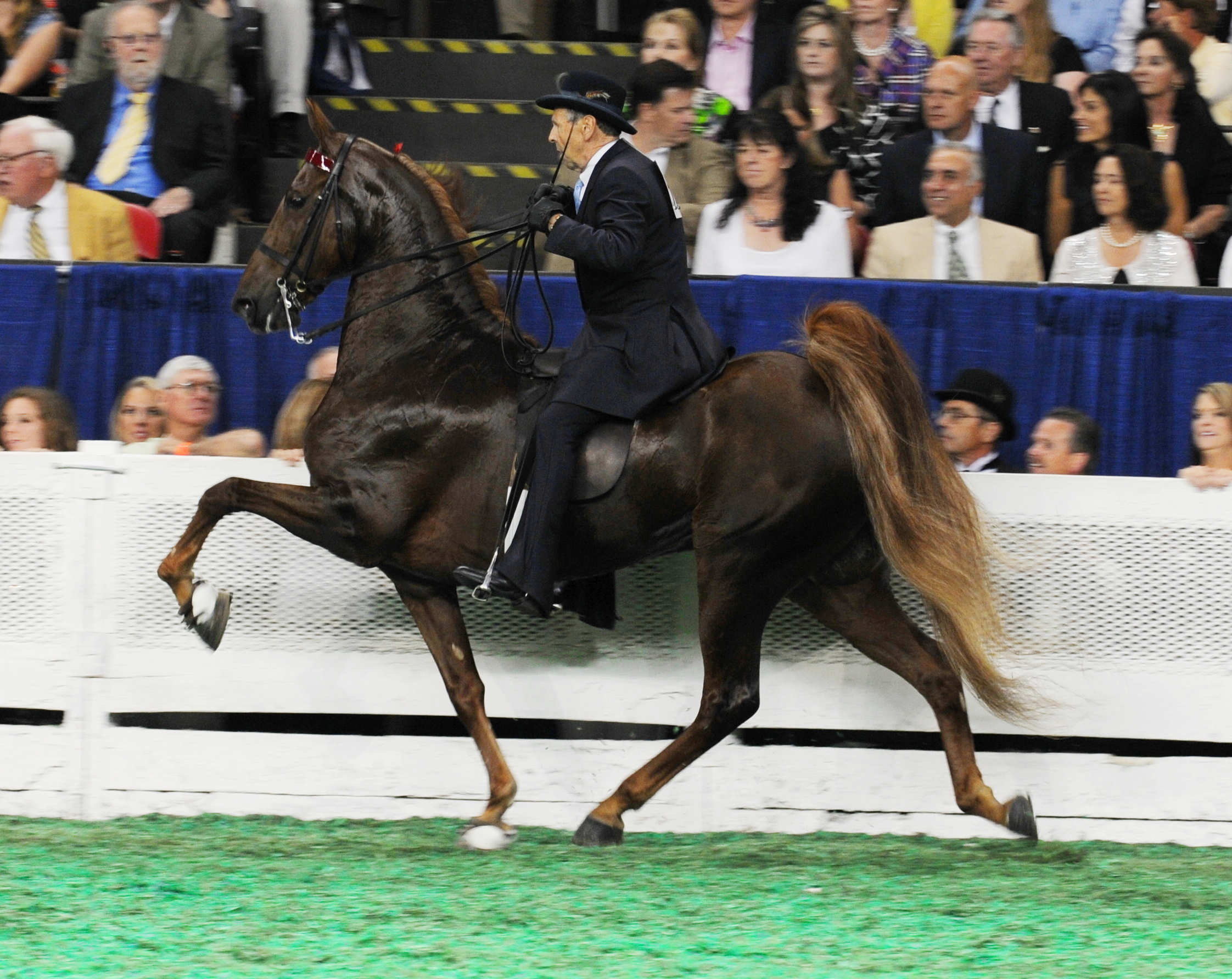
High-stepping action is typical of the Saddlebred, as seen in this "five-gaited" horse, performing the rack.

American Saddlebreds stand 15 to 17 hands (60 to 68 inches, 152 to 173 cm) high, averaging 15 to 16 hands (60 to 64 inches, 152 to 163 cm), and weigh between 1,000 and 1,200 pounds (450 and 540 kg). Members of the breed have well-shaped heads with a straight profile, long, slim, arched necks, well-defined withers, sloping shoulders, correct leg conformation, and strong level backs with well-sprung ribs. The croup is level with a high-carried tail. Enthusiasts consider them to be spirited, yet gentle, animals. Any color is acceptable, but most common are chestnut, bay, brown and black. Some are gray, roan, palomino and pinto. The first-known pinto Saddlebred was a stallion foaled in 1882. In 1884 and 1891, two additional pintos, both mares, were foaled. These three horses were recorded as "spotted", but many other pinto Saddlebreds with minimal markings were recorded only by their base color, without making note of their markings. This practice continued into the 1930s, at which time breeders came to be more accepting of "colored" horses and began recording markings and registering horses as pinto. The Saddlebred has been called the "world's most beautiful horse" by admirers, and is known as the "peacock of the horse world". The United States Equestrian Federation (USEF) describes the Saddlebred as follows: "He carries himself with an attitude that is elusive of description—some call it "class", presence, quality, style, or charm. This superior air distinguishes his every movement."

Saddlebreds are popularly known as show horses, with horses being shown saddle seat in both three-gaited and five-gaited classes. The former are the three common gaits seen in most breeds, the walk, trot and canter. The latter includes the three regular gaits, plus two four-beat ambling gaits known as the slow gait and the rack. The slow gait is a four-beat gait which historically could be either the running walk, the stepping pace, or the fox trot. The modern five-gaited Saddlebred typically performs a stepping pace, a four-beat gait in which the lateral pairs of legs leave the ground together, but strike the ground at different times, the hind foot connecting slightly before the forefoot. In the show ring, the gait should be performed with restraint and precision.

The rack is also a lateral four-beat gait, but with equal intervals between each footfall. In the show ring, the gait is performed with speed and action, appearing unrestrained.

=== Health concerns ===
Lordosis, also known as swayback, low back or soft back, has been found to have a hereditary basis in Saddlebreds and a recessive mode of inheritance. The precise mutation has not yet been located, but researchers believe it to be somewhere on horse chromosome 20. Researching this condition may help more than just the Saddlebred breed as it may "serve as a model for investigating congenital skeletal deformities in horses and other species." Horses with lordosis are generally healthy and unaffected by the condition, and are eligible to compete in many divisions, but a swayback must be penalized as a fault at shows, in addition to other conformation flaws. Due to the high head position common in the show ring, Saddlebreds can have impairments to the upper respiratory system, but it is rare.

== History ==
The Saddlebred has origins in the Galloway and Hobby horses of the British Isles, animals sometimes called palfreys, which had ambling gaits and were brought to the United States by early settlers. These animals were further refined in America to become a now-extinct breed called the Narragansett Pacer, a riding and driving breed known for its ambling and pacing gaits. When colonists imported Thoroughbreds to America, beginning in 1706, they were crossed with the Narragansett Pacer, which, combined with massive exports, ultimately led to the extinction of the Narragansett as a purebred breed. To preserve important bloodlines, Canadian Pacers were introduced instead. By the time of the American Revolution, a distinct type of riding horse had developed with the size and quality of the Thoroughbred, but the ambling gaits and stamina of the Pacer breeds. This animal was called the American Horse. Its existence was first documented in a 1776 letter when an American diplomat wrote to the Continental Congress asking for one to be sent to France as a gift for Marie Antoinette.

=== 19th century ===
Other breeds which played a role in the development of the Saddlebred in the 19th century include the Morgan, Standardbred and Hackney. The Canadian Pacer had a particularly significant impact. The breed, originally of French origin, was also influential in the development of the Standardbred and Tennessee Walking Horse. The most influential Canadian Pacer on Saddlebred lines was Tom Hall, a blue roan stallion foaled in 1806. After being imported to the United States from Canada, he was registered as an American Saddlebred and became the foundation stallion of several Saddlebred lines.

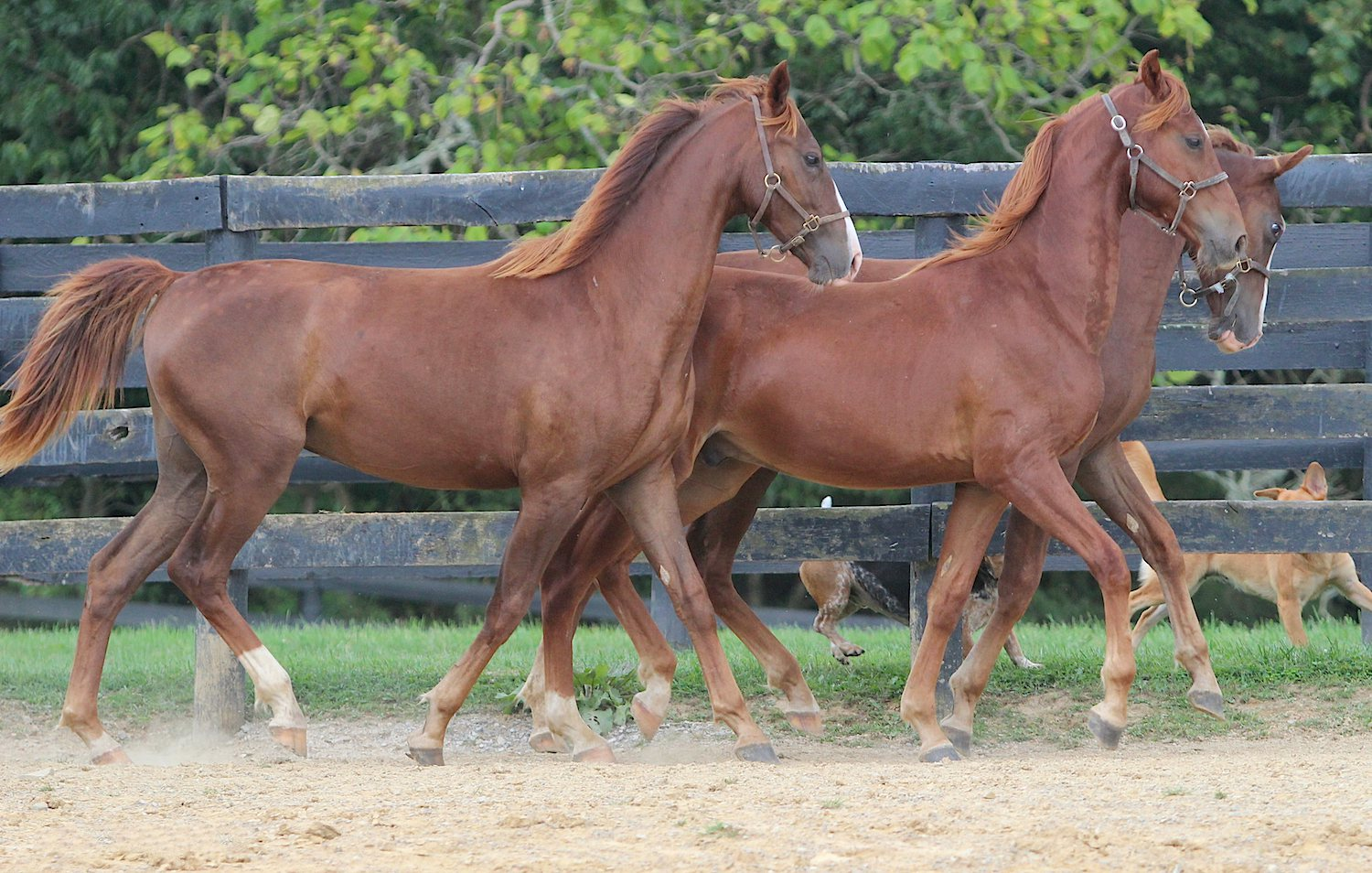
Yearlings at a farm in Kentucky

The American Horse was further refined in Kentucky, where the addition of more Thoroughbred blood created a taller and better-looking horse that became known as the Kentucky Saddler. There were originally seventeen foundation stallions listed by the breed registry, but by 1908 the registry decided to list only one and the remainder were identified as "Noted Deceased Sires." Today, two foundation sires of the breed are recognized, both Thoroughbred crosses. The first was Denmark, son of an imported Thoroughbred, who for many years was the only recognized foundation stallion. His son, Gaines' Denmark, was in the pedigrees of over 60 percent of the horses registered in the first three volumes of the breed's studbook. A second foundation sire was recognized in 1991, Harrison Chief. This sire was a descendent of the Thoroughbred Messenger, who is also considered a foundation stallion for the Standardbred breed.

During the American Civil War, American Saddlebreds were commonly used by the military, and known for their bravery and endurance. Many officers used them as mounts, and included in their numbers are General Lee's Traveller, General Grant's Cincinnati, General Sherman's Lexington, and General Jackson's Little Sorrell. Other generals who used them during the conflict include John Hunt Morgan and Basil W. Duke during his time with Morgan's Raiders. Kentucky Saddlers were used during brutal marches with the latter group, and the historical record suggests that they held up better than horses of other breeds.

The American Saddlebred Horse Association was formed in 1891, then called the National Saddle Horse Breeders Association (NSHBA). Private individuals had produced studbooks for other breeds, such as the Morgan, as early as 1857, but the NSHBA was the first national association for an American-developed breed of horse. A member of Morgan's Raiders, General John Breckinridge Castleman, was instrumental in forming the NSHBA. In 1899, the organization name was changed to the American Saddle Horse Breeders Association, clarifying the breed's name as the "American Saddle Horse," not simply "Saddle Horse."

=== 20th century to present ===
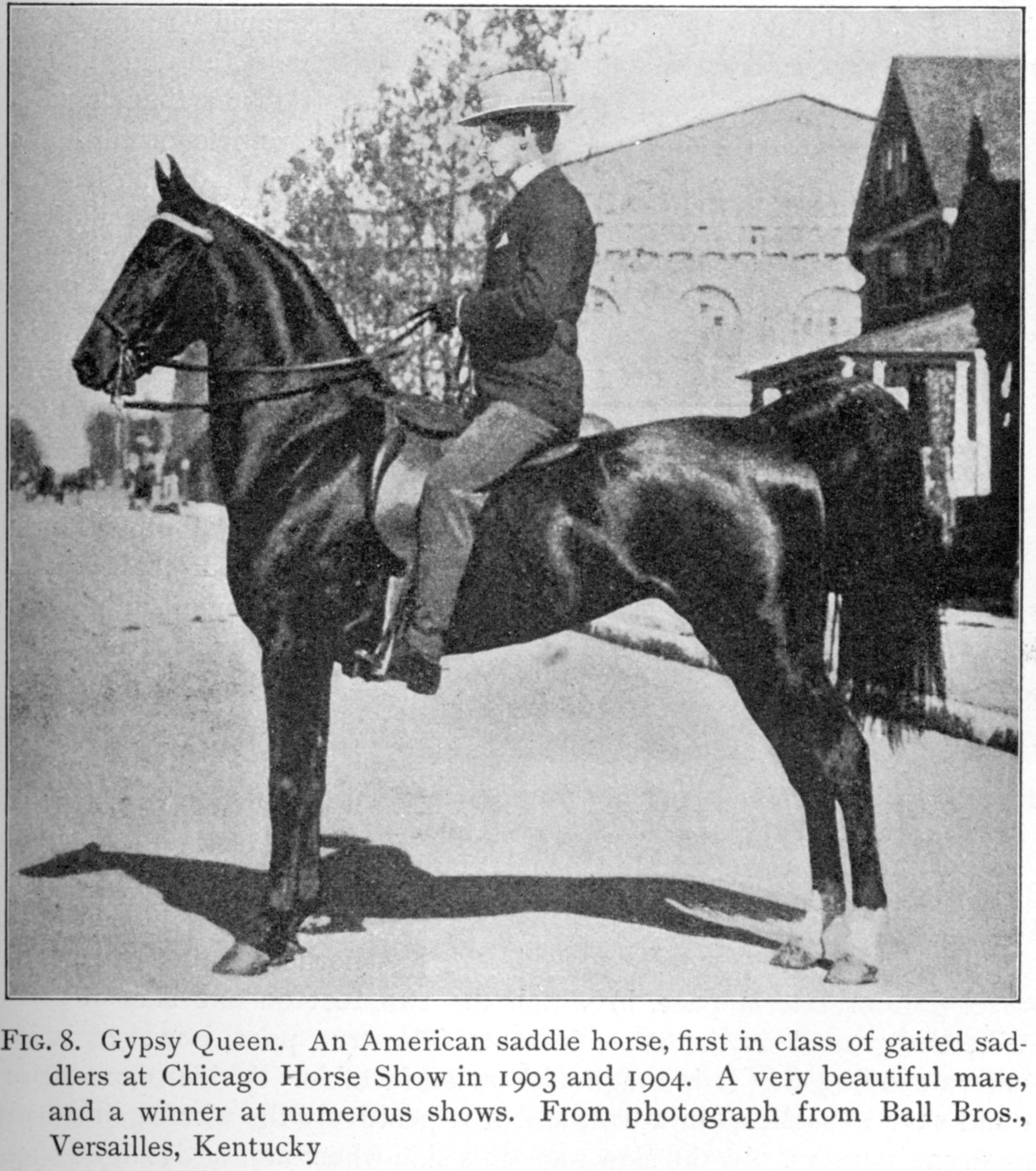
American Saddlebred mare, circa 1906

After World War I, the American Saddlebred began to be exported to South Africa, and it is now the most popular non-racing breed in that country. Saddlebred horse show standards continued to evolve through the 1920s, as the popularity of the breed grew. The Saddlebred industry slowed during World War II, but began to grow again post-war, with Mexico, Missouri earning the title "Saddle Horse Capital of the World". Exports continued, and though attempts to begin a South African breed registry had started in 1935, it was not until 1949 that the Saddle Horse Breeders' Society of South Africa was formed. The 1950s saw continued growth of the Saddlebred breed, and The Lemon Drop Kid, a fine harness horse, became the first, and only, Saddlebred to appear on the cover of Sports Illustrated. In the late 1950s, the Saddle Horse Capital became centered in Shelby County, Kentucky, largely due to the success of breeders Charles and Helen Crabtree, the latter a renowned equitation coach. Although individual Saddlebreds had been exported to Great Britain throughout the breed's history, the first breeding groups were transported there in 1966. For the next three decades, enthusiasts worked to establish a breeding and showing platform for the breed in the UK.

In 1980, the name of the American Saddle Horse Breeder's Association was changed to the American Saddlebred Horse Association (ASHA), membership was opened to non-breeders, and the group began to focus on breed promotion. In 1985, the ASHA became the first breed registry to have their headquarters at the Kentucky Horse Park in Lexington, Kentucky. A decade later, in 1995, the United Saddlebred Association – UK was formed to register Saddlebreds in Great Britain, and acts as the British affiliate of the ASHA. Since the founding of the American registry, almost 250,000 horses have been accepted, with almost 3,000 new foals registered annually. It is the oldest still-functioning breed registry in the US. Most common in the eastern US, the breed is also found throughout North America, Europe, Australia, and in South Africa.

Located at the Kentucky Horse Park is the American Saddlebred Museum, which curates a large collection of Saddlebred-related items and artwork, as well as a 2,500-volume library of breed-related works. There are many magazines which focus on the American Saddlebred: "Show Horse Magazine", "Bluegrass Horseman", "The National Horseman", "Saddle and Bridle", and "Show Horse International".

=== Show ring history ===
As a show horse, Saddlebreds were exhibited in Kentucky as early as 1816, and were a prominent part of the first national horse show in the United States, held at the St. Louis Fair in 1856. The Kentucky State Fair began running a World Championship show in 1917, offering a $10,000 prize for the champion five-gaited horse. Also in 1917, the American Horse Shows Association, now the United States Equestrian Federation, formed and began to standardize show formats and rules. In 1957, the American Saddlebred Pleasure Horse Association was formed to regulate English pleasure classes. Today, the most prestigious award in the breed industry is the American Saddlebred "Triple Crown": winning the five-gaited championships at the Lexington Junior League Horse Show, the Kentucky State Fair World's Championship Horse Show, and American Royal horse show; a feat that has only been accomplished by six horses.

The breed's show history also paralleled major historical developments. Heavyweight boxing champion Joe Louis, who owned and exhibited Saddlebreds into the 1940s, organized the first "All-Negro" horse show in Utica, Michigan, allowing greater opportunities for African-American people to exhibit horses at a time when there was significant racial segregation in the United States. Gas shortages in the 1970s and 1980s put pressure on the recreational dollar, and saw the growth of single breed shows at the expense of the multi-breed traditional horse show. At the beginning of the 21st century, the number of women showing Saddlebreds increased, with female competitors winning several world championships.

== Uses ==
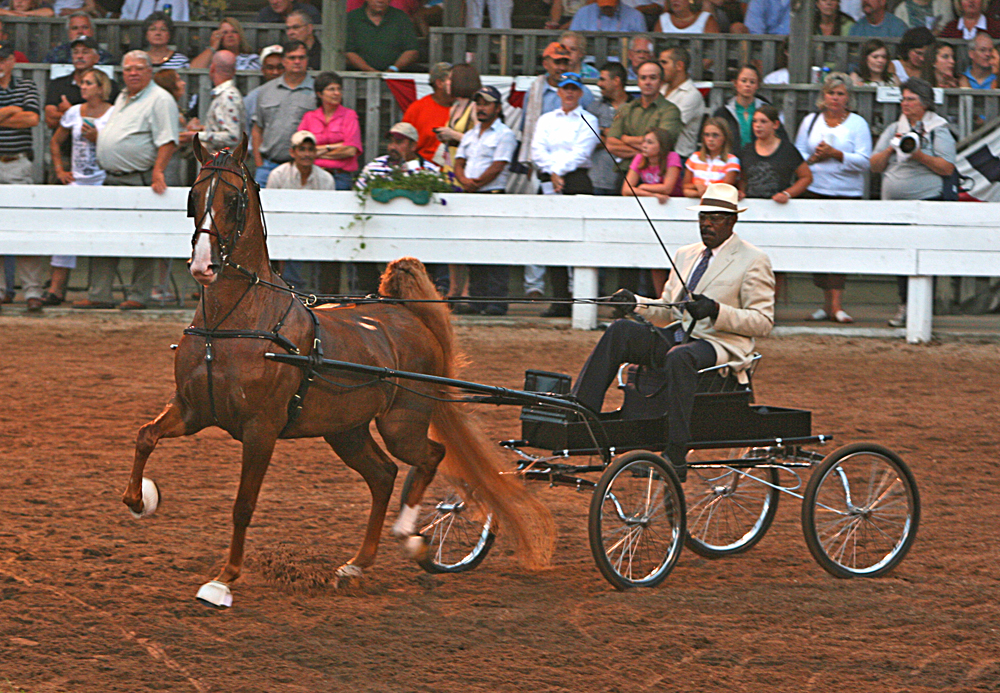
A Saddlebred in harness

Today, the Saddlebred is exhibited in the United States in multiple divisions, including assorted in-hand classes; ridden in saddle seat classes for three- and five-gaited horses in both Park and pleasure classes, hunter country pleasure, and western pleasure; plus pleasure driving, fine harness, roadster harness classes. In five-gaited competition, they are shown with a full tail, often augmented with an artificial switch, and a full mane. Three-gaited horses are shown with a shaved off "roached" mane and a full tail. The trend of the three-gaited horse being presented with the hair at the top of their tails, an area called the dock, trimmed short, has fallen out of style over the past several decades. While use of a set tail in certain types of competition was common, today, tail sets are generally not allowed on the show grounds for horses in the Pleasure divisions, and horses with unset tails are not penalized in any division. Gingering is prohibited.

Outside of breed-specific shows, the Saddlebred is also promoted as suitable for competitive trail riding, endurance riding, dressage, combined driving, eventing, and show jumping. Some Saddlebreds are also suitable for fox hunting, cutting and roping. Because they are so closely affiliated with their traditional show ring competition, they are sometimes mistaken for warmbloods or Thoroughbred crosses when participating in other equine events. They are also suitable family horses used for trail and pleasure riding and ranch work.

=== Film and celebrity affiliation ===
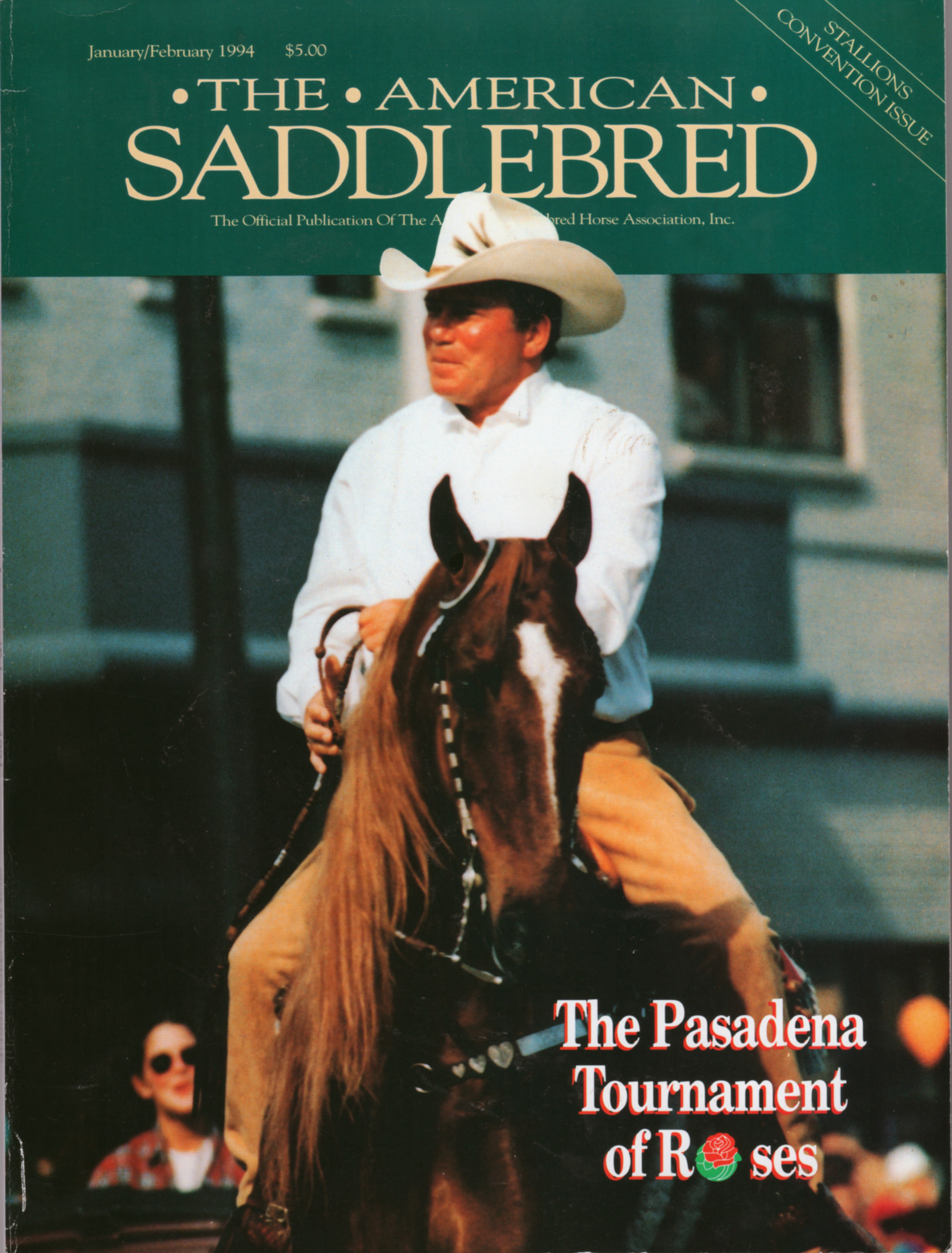
William Shatner on the cover of American Saddlebred magazine

Many film and television horses of the Golden Age of Hollywood were also Saddlebreds, including the horses used in lead roles in My Friend Flicka, National Velvet, Fury and one version of Black Beauty. A part-Saddlebred played the lead role in the TV series Mr. Ed, and a Saddlebred was used in a prominent role in Giant. In the 1990s, William Shatner, an actor and Saddlebred breeder, rode one of his own horses, a mare named Great Belles of Fire, in his role as James T. Kirk in Star Trek Generations. Numerous other celebrities besides Shatner have been owners and exhibitors of the breed, including Clark Gable, Will Rogers, Joe Louis, and Carson Kressley.

== See also ==
- A Celebration of Horses: The American Saddlebred
