= Five-gaited =

Type of horse

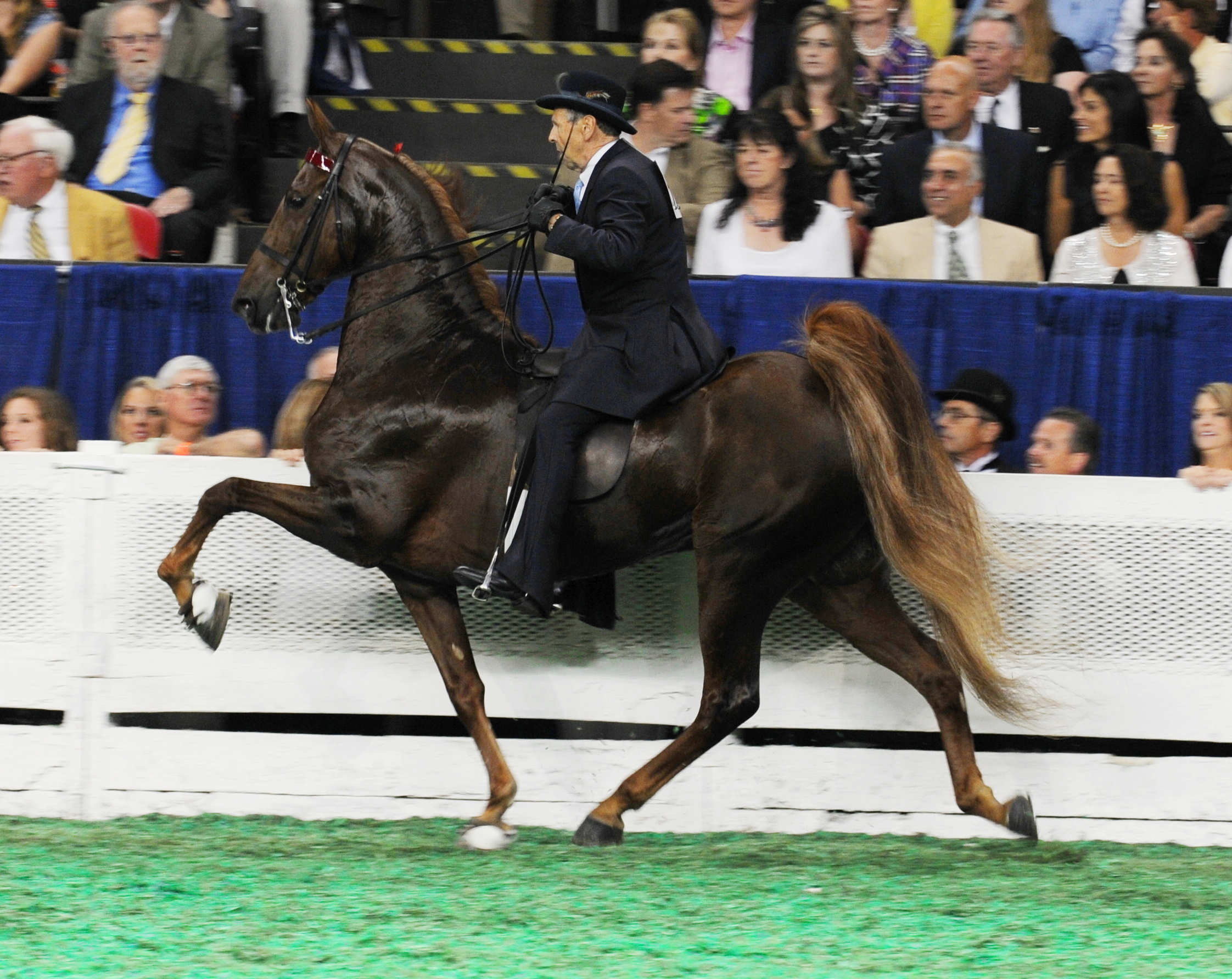
An American Saddlebred performing the rack

Five-gaited horses are notable for their ability to perform five distinct horse gaits instead of simply the three gaits, walk, trot and canter or gallop common to most horses. (Note: Some studies of horse gaits classify the canter and gallop as separate gaits due to the slight difference in footfall timing; the canter or lope is a three-beat gait, the gallop has the same footfall pattern, but the second beat of the canter is extended out to become two separate beats in the gallop) Individual animals with this ability are often seen in the American Saddlebred horse breed, though the Icelandic horse also has five-gaited individuals, though with a different set of gaits than the Saddlebred.

The ability to perform an ambling gait or to pace appears to be due to a specific genetic mutation. Some horses are able to both trot and perform an ambling gait, but many can only do one or the other, thus five-gaited ability is not particularly common in the horse world.

In the American Saddlebred and related breeds, the five gaits performed are the walk, trot, canter, and two ambling gaits: the rack, a fast, lateral, four-beat gait that is synchronous— "each foot meets the ground at equal, separate intervals"; and a "slow gait", a slower, smooth collected four-beat gait that is asynchronous — "the lateral front and hind feet start almost together but the hind foot contacts the ground slightly before its lateral forefoot." Another name for the slow gait is the stepping pace. The USEF is clear that the slow gait is not merely a slow version of the rack, but the primary difference between the two is the slight hesitation between the second and third beats of the slow gait. A five-gaited horse might also perform the fox trot rather than the stepping pace.

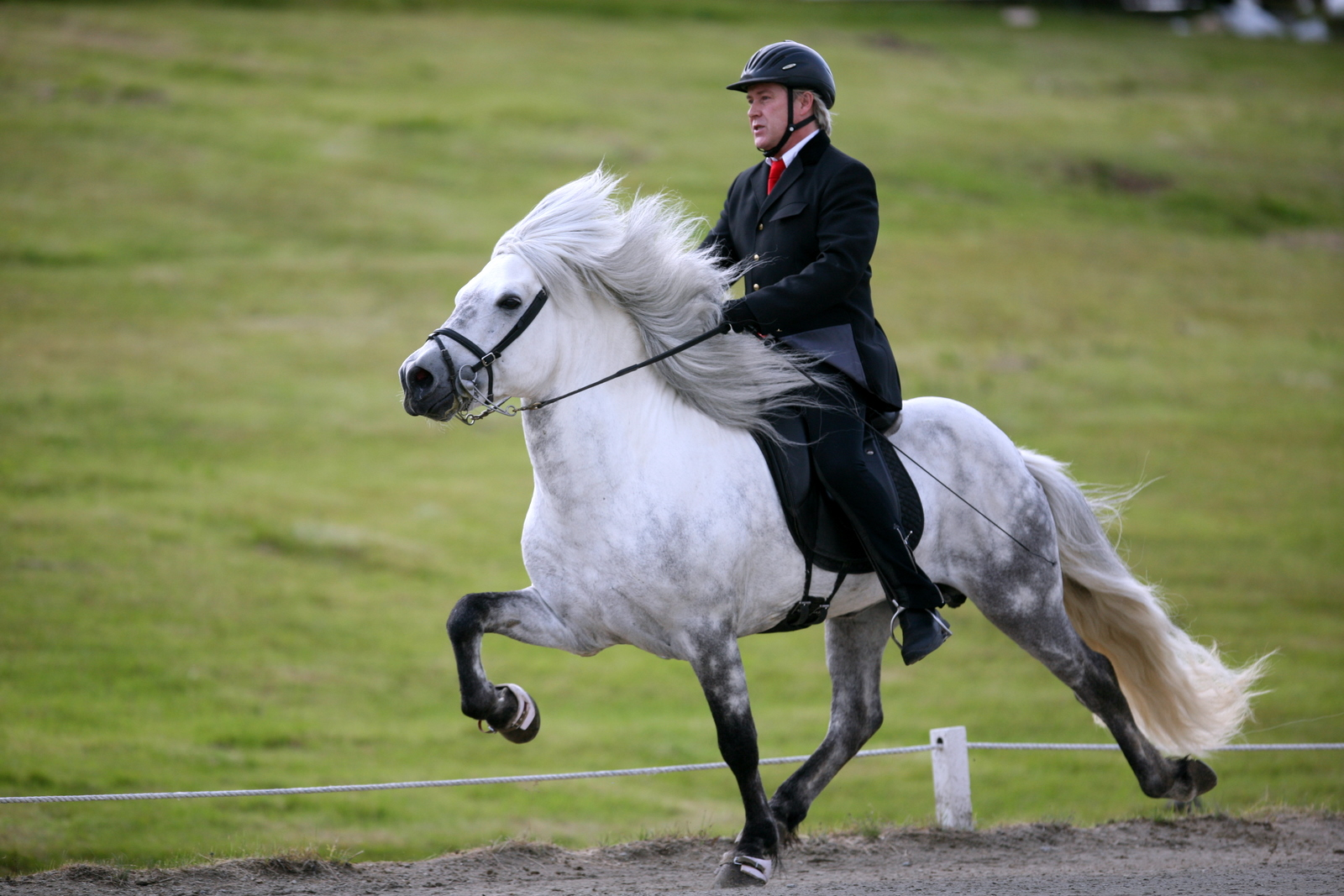
The tölt

In the Icelandic horse, the five gaits are the walk, trot, canter, tölt and the skeið, or flying pace. The tölt is a lateral four-beat gait compared to the rack of the Saddlebred, but in style of performance sometimes more closely resembles the largo of the Paso Fino, or the running walk of the Tennessee Walking Horse. Like all lateral ambling gaits, the footfall pattern is the same as the walk (left hind, left front, right hind, right front), but differs from the walk in that it can be performed at a range of speeds, from the speed of a typical fast walk up to the speed of a normal canter. Some Icelandic horses prefer to tölt, while others prefer to trot. The flying pace is a two-beat lateral gait, with a moment of suspension between the two sets of footfalls. At racing speeds, horses can perform the flying pace at speeds close to 30 mph. Icelandics that can perform the tölt but not the flying pace are called "four-gaited."

Other gaited horse breeds may be able to perform five gaits, and individual horses of breeds not normally noted for possessing ambling gaits may also do so. Examples of these include the part-Saddlebred National Show Horse, the Arabian horse, (Note: Raseyn was notable for being trained to perform five gaits and transmitted this ability to some of his descendants.) the Morgan, and the Morab.
