= CWA Historical Dagger =

- Description: Best historical crime novel set at least 35 years in the past
- Country: United Kingdom
- Presented by: Crime Writers' Association (CWA)
- Website: thecwa.co.uk/awards-and-competitions/the-daggers/historical-dagger/

The CWA Historical Dagger (currently called the CWA Endeavor Historical Dagger) is an annual award given by the British Crime Writers' Association to the author of the best historical crime novel of the year. Established in 1999, it is presented to a novel "with a crime theme and a historical background of any period up to 35 years before the current year".

The award was called the Ellis Peters Historical Dagger from 1999 to 2005, and was known as the Ellis Peters Historical Award from 2006 to 2012, to commemorate the life and work of historical crime writer Ellis Peters, whose Cadfael Chronicles (1977–1994) are generally credited with popularizing the genre that would become known as the historical mystery.

Starting in 2014, the award became known as the CWA Endeavour Historical Dagger through sponsorship by Endeavor Press.

== Honorees ==
Year	Author	Title	Publisher	Result	Ref.
1999	Lindsey Davis	Two for the Lions	Century	Winner	
1999	Ian Morson	Falconer and the Great Beast		Shortlist	
1999	Charles Todd	Wings of Fire		Shortlist	
2000	Gillian Linscott	Absent Friends	Virago Press	Winner	
2000	Rennie Airth	River of Darkness		Shortlist	
2000	Clare Curzon	Guilty Knowledge		Shortlist	
2000	Pierre Magnan	The Murdered House		Shortlist	
2000	Hannah March	The Devil’s Highway		Shortlist	
2000	Michael Pearce	Death of an Effendi		Shortlist	
2000	Laura Wilson	A Little Death		Shortlist	
2001	Andrew Taylor	The Office Of The Dead	HarperCollins	Winner	
2001	Michael Pearce	A Cold Touch of Ice		Runner Up	
2001	Lindsey Davis	Ode to a Banker		Shortlist	
2001	Hannah March	A Distinction of Blood		Shortlist	
2001	Steven Saylor	Last Seen in Massilia		Shortlist	
2001	Penn Williamson	Mortal Sins		Shortlist	
2002	Sarah Waters	Fingersmith	Virago Press	Winner	
2002	Lindsey Davis	The Jupiter Myth		Shortlist	
2002	Philip Gooden	The Pale Companion		Shortlist	
2002	Gillian Linscott	Dead Man Riding		Shortlist	
2002	José Carlos Somoza	The Athenian Murders		Shortlist	
2002	Martin Stephen	The Desperate Remedy		Shortlist	
2003	Andrew Taylor	The American Boy	Flamingo	Winner	
2003	Tom Bradby	The White Russian		Shortlist	
2003	Marcello Fois	The Advocate		Shortlist	
2003	Lee Jackson	London Dust		Shortlist	
2003	Gillian Linscott	Blood on the Wood		Shortlist	
2003	C. J. Sansom	Dissolution		Shortlist	
2003	Olen Steinhauer	The Bridge of Sighs		Shortlist	
2004	Barbara Cleverly	The Damascened Blade	Constable & Robinson	Winner	
2004	Marjorie Eccles	The Shape of Sand		Shortlist	
2004	Tom Franklin	Hell at the Breech		Shortlist	
2004	Janet Gleeson	The Thief Taker		Shortlist	
2004	Matthew Pearl	The Dante Club		Shortlist	
2004	Steven Saylor	The Judgment of Caesar		Shortlist	
2004	Laura Wilson	The Lover		Shortlist	
2005	C. J. Sansom	Dark Fire	Macmillan	Winner	
2005	Tom Bradby	The God of Chaos		Shortlist	
2005	Barbara Cleverly	The Palace Tiger		Shortlist	
2005	Catriona McPherson	After the Armistice Ball		Shortlist	
2005	Iain Pears	The Portrait		Shortlist	
2005	Frank Tallis	Mortal Mischief		Shortlist	
2006	Edward Wright	Red Sky Lament	Orion	Winner	
2006	Louis Bayard	The Pale Blue Eye		Shortlist	
2006	Nick Drake	Nefertiti: The Book of the Dead		Shortlist	
2006	Jason Goodwin	The Janissary Tree		Shortlist	
2006	C. J. Sansom	Sovereign		Shortlist	
2006	Jenny White	The Sultan’s Seal		Shortlist	
2007	Ariana Franklin	Mistress of the Art of Death	Bantam Press	Winner	
2007	Jason Goodwin	The Snake Stone		Shortlist	
2007	Philip Kerr	The One from the Other		Shortlist	
2007	Andrew Martin	Murder at Deviation Junction		Shortlist	
2007	Mark Mills	The Savage Garden		Shortlist	
2007	Stef Penney	The Tenderness of Wolves		Shortlist	
2008	Laura Wilson	Stratton’s War	Orion	Winner	
2008	Ariana Franklin	The Death Maze		Shortlist	
2008	Philip Kerr	A Quiet Flame		Shortlist	
2008	Andrew Martin	Death on a Branch Line		Shortlist	
2008	C. J. Sansom	Revelation		Shortlist	
2008	Andrew Taylor	Bleeding Heart Square		Shortlist	
2009	Philip Kerr	If The Dead Rise Not	Quercus	Winner	
2009	Rennie Airth	The Dead of Winter		Shortlist	
2009	Shona MacLean	The Redemption of Alexander Seaton		Shortlist	
2009	Mark Mills	The Information Officer		Shortlist	
2009	Andrew Williams	The Interrogator		Shortlist	
2009	Laura Wilson	An Empty Death		Shortlist	
2010	Rory Clements	Revenger	John Murray	Winner	
2010	Aly Monroe	Washington Shadow		Shortlist	
2010	S. J. Parris	Heresy		Shortlist	
2010	C. J. Sansom	Heartstone		Shortlist	
2010	Andrew Taylor	The Anatomy of Ghosts		Shortlist	
2010	Andrew Williams	To Kill a Tsar		Shortlist	
2011	Andrew Martin	The Somme Stations	Faber and Faber	Winner	
2011	Rory Clements	Prince		Shortlist	
2011	Sam Eastland	The Red Coffin		Shortlist	
2011	Gordon Ferris	The Hanging Shed		Shortlist	
2011	R. N. Morris	The Cleansing Flames		Shortlist	
2011	Imogen Robertson	Island of Bones		Shortlist	
2012	Aly Monroe	Icelight	John Murray	Winner	
2012	Nancy Bilyeau	The Crown		Shortlist	
2012	Maurizio de Giovanni	I Will Have Vengeance		Shortlist	
2012	Gordon Ferris	Bitter Water		Shortlist	
2012	Philip Kerr	Prague Fatale		Shortlist	
2012	S. J. Parris	Sacrilege		Shortlist	
2012	Laura Wilson	A Willing Victim		Shortlist	
2013	Andrew Taylor	The Scent of Death	HarperCollins	Winner	
2013	Rory Clements	The Heretics		Shortlist	
2013	Gordon Ferris	Pilgrim Soul		Shortlist	
2013	Imogen Robertson	The Paris Winter		Shortlist	
2013	Craig Russell	Dead Men and Broken Hearts		Shortlist	
2013	William Ryan	The Twelfth Department		Shortlist	
2014	Antonia Hodgson	The Devil in the Marshalsea	Hodder & Stoughton	Winner	
2014	Kate Griffin	Kitty Peck and the Music Hall Murders		Shortlist	
2014	S. J. Parris	Treachery		Shortlist	
2014	Jill Paton Walsh	The Late Scholar		Shortlist	
2014	Michael Russell	The City of Strangers		Shortlist	
2014	Imogen Robertson	Theft of Life		Shortlist	
2014	Robert Ryan	The Dead Can Wait		Shortlist	
2015	S. G. MacLean	The Seeker	Quercus	Winner	
2015	Martin Davies	Havana Sleeping		Shortlist	
2015	Luke McCallin	The Man From Berlin		Shortlist	
2015	C. J. Sansom	Lamentation		Shortlist	
2015	Andrew Taylor	The Silent Boy		Shortlist	
2016	David Young	Stasi Child	Twenty7Books	Winner	
2016	Michelle Birkby	The House at Baker Street		Shortlist	
2016	Philip Kerr	The Other Side of Silence		Shortlist	
2016	William Shaw	A Book of Scars		Shortlist	
2016	Fiona Veitch Smith	The Jazz Files		Shortlist	
2016	A. J. Wright	Striking Murder		Shortlist	
2017	Abir Mukherjee	A Rising Man	Harvill Secker	Winner	
2017	M. J. Carter	The Devil’s Feast		Shortlist	
2017	Luke McCallin	The Ashes of Berlin		Shortlist	
2017	Denise Mina	The Long Drop		Shortlist	
2017	Steven Price	By Gaslight		Shortlist	
2017	Michael Russell	The City in Darkness		Shortlist	
2018	Rory Clements	Nucleus	Zaffre Publishing	Winner	
2018	Abir Mukherjee	A Necessary Evil	Harvill Secker	Shortlist	
2018	L. C. Tyler	Fire	Constable	Shortlist	
2018	Thomas Mullen	Lightning Men	Little, Brown & Co.	Shortlist	
2018	Ngaio Marsh and Stella Duffy	Money in the Morgue	HarperCollins	Shortlist	
2018	Nicola Upson	Nine Lessons	Faber & Faber	Shortlist	
2019	S. G. MacLean	Destroying Angel	Quercus	Winner	
2019	Liam McIlvanney	The Quaker		Shortlist	
2019	Abir Mukherjee	Smoke and Ashes		Shortlist	
2019	Alex Reeve	The House on Half Moon Street		Shortlist	
2019	C. J. Sansom	Tombland		Shortlist	
2019	Laura Shepherd-Robinson	Blood & Sugar		Shortlist	
2020	Abir Mukherjee	Death in the East	Harvill Secker	Winner	
2020	Alis Hawkins	In Two Minds		Shortlist	
2020	Philip Kerr	Metropolis		Shortlist	
2020	S. G. MacLean	The Bear Pit		Shortlist	
2020	Alex Reeve	The Anarchists’ Club		Shortlist	
2020	Ovidia Yu	The Paper Bark Tree Mystery		Shortlist	
2021	Vaseem Khan	Midnight at Malabar House	Hodder & Stoughton	Winner	
2021	John Banville	Snow	Faber and Faber	Shortlist	
2021	Chris Lloyd	The Unwanted Dead	Orion	Shortlist	
2021	Michael Russell	The City Under Siege	Constable; Little, Brown Book Group	Shortlist	
2021	David Stafford	Skelton’s Guide to Domestic Poisons	Allison & Busby	Shortlist	
2021	Ovidia Yu	The Mimosa Tree Mystery	Constable; Little, Brown Book Group	Shortlist	
2022	Ray Celestin	Sunset Swing	Pan Macmillan; Mantle	Winner	
2022	John Banville	April in Spain	Faber and Faber	Shortlist	
2022	Andy Charman	Crow Court	Unbound	Shortlist	
2022	Alis Hawkins	Not One of Us	Canelo	Shortlist	
2022	Robbie Morrison	Edge of the Grave	Pan Macmillan; Macmillan	Shortlist	
2022	Ambrose Parry	A Corruption of Blood	Canongate Books	Shortlist	
2023	D. V. Bishop	The Darkest Sin	Pan Macmillan; Macmillan	Winner	
2023	Anna Mazzola	The Clockwork Girl	Orion	Shortlist	
2023	J. B. Mylet	The Homes	Viper	Shortlist	
2023	Harini Nagendra	The Bangalore Detectives Club	Little, Brown Book Group, Constable	Shortlist	
2023	Leonora Nattrass	Blue Water	Viper	Shortlist	
2023	Sarah Smith	Hear No Evil	John Murray	Shortlist	
2024	Jake Lamar	Viper's Dream	No Exit Press	Winner	
2024	Lucy Ashe	Clara & Olivia	Oneworld	Shortlist	
2024	Louise Hare	Harlem After Midnight	HarperCollins	Shortlist	
2024	Alis Hawkins	A Bitter Remedy	Canelo	Shortlist	
2024	Leonora Nattrass	Scarlet Town	Viper	Shortlist	
2024	Ambrose Parry	Voices of the Dead	Cannongate Books	Shortlist	
2025	A.J. West	The Betrayal of Thomas True	Orenda	Winner	
2025	D.V. Bishop	A Divine Fury	Macmillan	Shortlist	
2025	Chris Lloyd	Banquet of Beggars	Orion	Shortlist	
2025	Anna Mazzola	The Book of Secrets	Orion	Shortlist	
2025	Clare Whitfield	Poor Girls	Head of Zeus	Shortlist	
2026	Nina Allan	A Granite Silence	Quercus; riverrun	Winner	
2026	Donna Moore	The Devil's Draper	Fly on the Wall Press	Shortlist	
2026	Rob McInroy	Barvick Falls	Tippermuir Books	Shortlist	
2026	Alan Parks	Gunner	John Murray Press; Baskerville	Shortlist	
2026	Laura Shepherd-Robinson	The Art of a Lie	Pan Macmillan; Mantle	Shortlist	
2026	Sally Smith	A Case of Life and Limb	Bloomsbury Publishing; Raven Books	Shortlist	
