= Ed Hughes (composer) =

British composer (born 1968)

Ed Dudley Hughes (born 1968) is a British composer, born in Bristol.

== Work ==
His work as a composer has included ensemble, orchestral, solo and choral/vocal compositions, many of which have been performed in the UK and abroad, and broadcast on BBC Radio 3.

Commissions have come from City of London Festival/The Opera Group (an opera, The Birds), Brighton Festival (Memory of Colour, Battleship Potemkin), Glyndebourne Festival Opera / Photoworks (Auditorium, a film with Sophy Rickett), Tacet Ensemble, I Fagiolini, amongst others.

His work has been featured at De La Warr Pavilion, Sydney Opera House Studio, Barbican Centre, Buxton Opera House, Salamanca Festival, British Library Atrium (Breaking the Rules), Glyndebourne, Jerusalem Music Centre, Hanns Eisler Conservatoire Berlin, and many other venues. Nominations include British Composer Awards for New Media and Sonic Art. He is Senior Lecturer in Music at Sussex University.

His scores to Sergei Eisenstein's classic silent films Battleship Potemkin and Strike were specially recorded by the New Music Players and released in 2007 on Tartan DVD in Dolby Digital and DTS (5.1).

He collaborated with the author Roger Morris on a new opera entitled Cocteau In The Underworld, which has received work-in-progress performances through the OperaGenesis scheme, an ROH2 initiative with the support of the Genesis Foundation.

Examples of his work can be heard on his website. His work is published by University of York Music Press.

== Other activities ==
Ed Hughes edited and published the periodical Farben (1991–2) which existed only for two issues, during which it featured writing by David Aldridge, Julian Anderson, Anthony Everett, Brian Ferneyhough, Christopher Fox, morison/opit, Colin Rose, Luke Stoneham and Dhao Xipt. Farben 1992 also incorporated "Five new, neither previously published nor circulated, works for piano solo printed here complete and ready ot try at home" by David Aldridge, James Clapperton, Martin Pyne, Michael Finnissy and Hughes himself.
