= Brian Tracy =

Canadian-American motivational speaker and author (1944–2026)

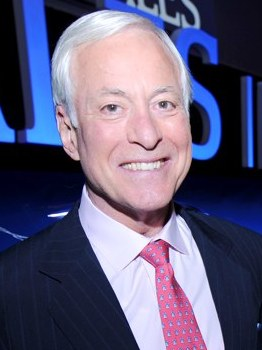
- Tracy in 2009
- Born: Brian Tracy; January 5, 1944; Charlottetown, Prince Edward Island, Canada
- Died: November 12, 2026 (aged 82)
- Education: University of Alberta
- Occupations: CEO, chairman, motivational speaker, author
- Spouse: Barbara Tracy (m. 1979)
- Children: 4
- Writing career
- Notable work: Eat That Frog! (2001)
- Website: Official website

Brian Tracy (January 5, 1944 – November 12, 2026) was a Canadian-American motivational public speaker and self-development author. He was the author of over eighty books, the most popular being: Earn What You're Really Worth, Eat That Frog!, No Excuses! The Power of Self-Discipline, and The Psychology of Achievement.

== Background ==
Brian Tracy was born in Charlottetown, Prince Edward Island, Canada, on January 5, 1944. He died on November 12, 2026, at the age of 82.

== Career ==
Tracy was the chairman and chief executive officer (CEO) of Brian Tracy International, a company Tracy founded in 1984 in Vancouver, British Columbia. The company provides counseling on leadership, selling, self-esteem, goals, strategy, creativity, and success psychology.

== Politics ==
=== 2003 California gubernatorial recall election ===
In 2003, Tracy stood as one of 135 candidates in the California gubernatorial recall election on an independent platform, receiving 729 votes. His campaign was featured on the BBC Radio 4 show Broadcasting House.

=== The Heritage Foundation ===
From 2003, Tracy was a trustee of The Heritage Foundation, a conservative think tank responsible for Project 2025.

== Selected bibliography ==
- The Psychology of Selling: Increase Your Sales Faster and Easier Than You Ever Thought Possible (1988), Thomas Nelson; ISBN 9780785288060.
- The Science of Self-Confidence (1991); ISBN 9781905953585.
- Maximum Achievement: Strategies and Skills that Will Unlock Your Hidden Powers to Succeed (1993), Simon & Schuster; ISBN 9780684803319.
- Accelerated Learning Techniques (with Colin Rose) (1995), Nightingale-Conant; ISBN 9780671536848.
- How to Master Your Time (1995); ISBN 9781633120327.
- The 21 Success Secrets of Self-Made Millionaires: How to Achieve Financial Independence Faster and Easier Than You Ever Thought Possible (2001), Berrett-Koehler Publishers; ISBN 9781583762059.
- Get Paid More and Promoted Faster: 21 Great Ways to Get Ahead in Your Career (2001), Berrett-Koehler Publishers; ISBN 9781583762073.
- Hire and Keep the Best People: 21 Practical and Proven Techniques You Can Use Immediately (2001), Berrett-Koehler Publishers; ISBN 9781576751695.
- Focal Point: A Proven System to Simplify Your Life, Double Your Productivity, and Achieve All Your Goals (2001), AMACOM; ISBN 9780814471296.
- The Psychology of Achievement (2002), Simon & Schuster Audio/Nightingale-Conant; ISBN 9780743526586.
- The 100 Absolutely Unbreakable Laws of Business Success (2002), Berrett-Koehler Publishers; ISBN 9781576751268.
- Change Your Thinking, Change Your Life: How to Unlock Your Full Potential for Success and Achievement (2003), Wiley & Sons, Incorporated, John; ISBN 9780471448587.
- Be a Sales Superstar: 21 Great Ways to Sell More, Faster, Easier in Tough Markets (2003), Berrett-Koehler Publishers; ISBN 9781576752739.
- Many Miles to Go: A Modern Parable for Business Success (2003), Entrepreneur Press; ISBN 9781891984990.
- The Ultimate Goals Program: How To Get Everything You Want Faster Than You Thought Possible (2003), Simon & Schuster Audio/Nightinga; ISBN 9780743561495.
- The Power of Clarity: Find Your Focal Point, Maximize Your Income, Minimize Your Effort (2003); ISBN 9780974196428.
- Advanced Selling Strategies (2004); ISBN 9780976123910.
- Time Power: A Proven System for Getting More Done in Less Time Than You Ever Thought Possible (2004); ISBN 9780814427859.
- TurboCoach: A Powerful System for Achieving Breakthrough Career Success (with Campbell Fraser) (2005), AMACOM; ISBN 9780814472484.
- Create Your Own Future: How to Master the 12 Critical Factors of Unlimited Success (2005), Wiley & Sons, Incorporated, John; ISBN 9780471718529.
- The Power of Charm: How to Win Anyone Over in Any Situation (2006); ISBN 9780814429716.
- The Art of Closing the Sale: The Key to Making More Money Faster in the World of Professional Selling (2007), HarperCollins Focus; ISBN 9780785289135.
- Speak to Win: How to Present with Power in Any Situation (2008); ISBN 9780814401828.
- The New Psychology of Achievement: Breakthrough Strategies for Success and Happiness in the 21st Century (2008), Simon & Schuster Audio/Nightinga; ISBN 9780743583442.
- Flight Plan: The Real Secret of Success (2009), Berrett-Koehler Publishers; ISBN 9781605092751.
- Reinvention: How to Make the Rest of Your Life the Best of Your Life (2009), AMACOM; ISBN 9780814437544.
- The Miracle of Self-Discipline (2010), Nightingale Conant; ISBN 9781908364043.
- No Excuses!: The Power of Self-Discipline (2010), Carroll & Graf; ISBN 9781593155827.
- How the Best Leaders Lead: Proven Secrets to Getting the Most Out of Yourself and Others (2010); ISBN 9780814414354.
- Goals!: How to Get Everything You Want Faster Than You Ever Thought Possible, 2nd Edition (2010), Berrett-Koehler Publishers; ISBN 9781605094113.
- Kiss That Frog!: 21 Great Ways to Turn Negatives into Positives in Your Life and Work (with Christina Tracy Stein) (2012), Berrett-Koehler Publishers; ISBN 9781609942809.
- Earn What You're Really Worth: Maximize Your Income at Any Time in Any Market (2012), Carroll & Graf; ISBN 9781593156305.
- The Power of Self-Confidence: Become Unstoppable, Irresistible, and Unafraid in Every Area of Your Life (2012); ISBN 9781118464014.
- Negotiation (The Brian Tracy Success Library) (2013); ISBN 9780814433195.
- Motivation (The Brian Tracy Success Library) (2013); ISBN 9780814433126.
- 12 Disciplines of Leadership Excellence: How Leaders Achieve Sustainable High Performance (with Peter Chee) (2013), McGraw-Hill Education; ISBN 9780071809467.
- Time Management (The Brian Tracy Success Library) (2014); ISBN 9780814433447.
- Creativity and Problem Solving (The Brian Tracy Success Library) (2014); ISBN 9780814433171.
- Leadership (2014), AMACOM; ISBN 9780814433416.
- Find Your Balance Point: Clarify Your Priorities, Simplify Your Life, and Achieve More (with Christina Stein) (2015), Berrett-Koehler Publishers; ISBN 9781626565722.
- Sales Success (2015), AMACOM; ISBN 9780814449196.
- Master Your Time, Master Your Life: The Breakthrough System to Get More Results, Faster, in Every Area of Your Life (2016); ISBN 9780399183836.
- Personal Success (the Brian Tracy Success Library) (2016), AMACOM; ISBN 9780814437032.
- Just Shut Up and Do It: 7 Steps to Conquer Your Goals (2016), Sourcebooks, Incorporated; ISBN 9781608106165.
- Eat That Frog!: 21 Great Ways to Stop Procrastinating and Get More Done in Less Time, 3rd Edition (2017), Berrett-Koehler Publishers; ISBN 9781626569416.
- Million Dollar Habits: Proven Power Practices to Double and Triple Your Income (2017); ISBN 9781613083734.
- Believe It to Achieve It: Overcome Your Doubts, Let Go of the Past, and Unlock Your Full Potential (2017); ISBN 9781524704872.
- Why People Don’t Believe You…: Building Credibility from the Inside Out (by Rob Jolles, foreword by Brian Tracy) (2018), Berrett-Koehler Publishers; ISBN 9781523095896.
