= The Whaleboat House =

2004 novel by Mark Mills

- First edition (with original name)
- Author: Mark Mills
- Original title: Amagansett
- Language: English
- Publisher: Fourth Estate
- Publication date: 2004-06-07
- Publication place: United Kingdom
- Media type: Print
- Pages: 268
- ISBN: 0-00-716190-5
- OCLC: 54424914
- Followed by: The Savage Garden

The Whaleboat House (originally published with the title Amagansett) is a 2004 crime novel by British writer Mark Mills. It is set shortly after the Second World War with the events taking place in and around the small Long Island fishing village of Amagansett.

The novel was originally published under the name Amagansett when it first appeared in 2004. However, when it was later published in paperback, the publishers, HarperCollins, changed the name to The Whaleboat House after deciding that the original title was too elliptical.

== Plot summary ==
Little has changed in Amagansett since the first settlers arrived there some 300 years earlier, but the discovery of the body of Lillian Wallace, a New York socialite, by a local fisherman named Conrad Labarde, shatters the apparent stability and threatens to tear the close-knit community apart.

Labarde (a second generation French Basque recently returned from the war in Europe), and Tom Hollis (a recently divorced former New York police detective posted to the area after his attempt to expose corruption resulted in the death of a colleague), are drawn to investigate Lillian's death, even though it appears to have been a tragic accident. They both have their own separate reasons to suspect that there is more to the death than meets the eye, and that it may have been the result of foul play.

== Awards ==
The novel won the Crime Writers' Association Award for Best Crime Novel by a Debut Author.
