= R. N. Morris =

English writer and advertising copywriter

- Born: 1960 (age 65–66); Manchester, England
- Occupation: Author
- Writing career
- Genres: Historical fiction, crime fiction
- Website: rogernmorris.co.uk

Roger N Morris (born 1960 in Manchester) is an English historical fiction author and advertising copywriter. He is known for the historical fiction novels based upon the Dostoevsky character Porfiry Petrovich, and for the Inspector Silas Quinn historical detective series.

== Work ==
Morris' first novel, Taking Comfort, was published by Macmillan New Writing and appeared in April 2006. His second novel The Gentle Axe, based on the character Porfiry Petrovich from Dostoevsky's Crime and Punishment, was published by the Penguin Press in 2007. The review website Kirkus characterised the novel as "Russian Lit Lite" while The New York Times was more positive, stating the novel "in many ways feels less like a modern tribute to Dostoyevsky than a translation of an overlooked novel by one of his contemporary imitators, transported into the present". The 2008 sequel, A Vengeful Longing, continued the premise and similarly featured the character of Porfiry Petrovich, investigating murders in St. Petersburg.

In 2010 Morris collaborated with the composer Ed Hughes on a new opera entitled Cocteau in the Underworld, which received work-in-progress performances through the OperaGenesis scheme, a ROH2 initiative with the support of the Genesis Foundation.

With the novel Summon Up the Blood, released in 2012, Morris started the Inspector Silas Quinn series of novels set in 1910s London. The sixth and latest Quinn release was in 2020, with the mystery The Music Box Enigma.

In January 2025, Morris was a guest on the Off the Shelf Podcast.

== Awards ==
Morris has twice been shortlisted for a Crime Writers' Association award. The first time in 2008 for his novel A Vengeful Longing for the Gold Dagger, and then again in 2011 The Cleansing Flames was in the running for the CWA Historical Dagger.

== Bibliography ==
- Taking Comfort. Macmillan New Writing. 2006. ISBN 9780230007406.
- The Gentle Axe. Penguin Press. 2007. ISBN 9781594201127.
- A Vengeful Longing. Penguin Press. 2008. ISBN 9781594201806.
- A Razor Wrapped in Silk. Faber & Faber. 2010. ISBN 9780571241156.
- The Cleansing Flames. Faber & Faber. 2011. ISBN 9780571259151.
- Summon Up the Blood. Canelo. 2012. ISBN 9781788638951.
- The Mannequin House. Canelo. 2012. ISBN 9781788638968.
- The Dark Palace. Canelo. 2014. ISBN 9781788638975.
- The Red Hand of Fury. Canelo. 2018. ISBN 9781788638982.
- The White Feather Killer. Canelo. 2019. ISBN 9781788638999.
- Psychotopia. Severn House. 2019. ISBN 9781448301744.
- The Music Box Enigma. Severn House. 2020. ISBN 9781448304301.
- Morris, Roger (2020). Fortune's Hand The Triumph and Tragedy of Walter Raleigh. Amazon Digital Services LLC - Kdp. ISBN 9798685342607.
- Law of Blood. 2021. ISBN 979-8541547436.
- The Crimson Child. 2023. ISBN 979-8393641474.

== See also ==
- Rory Clements – British fiction author
- Robert Harris (novelist) – English novelist (born 1957)
- C. J. Sansom – British author of crime fiction (1952–2024)
