= David Barnett (writer) =

English journalist and author

- Born: 11 January 1970 (age 56)

David Barnett (born 11 January 1970) is an English journalist and author. He began his journalism career in local newspapers, first the Wigan Observer and Chorley Guardian before moving on to the Lancashire Evening Post. He caught the tail-end of the era of typewriters before newsrooms replaced them with computers.

He has several published books, including Hinterland (Immanion Press, 2005, re-issued 2008), Angelglass (Immanion Press, 2007) and The Janus House and Other Two-Faced Tales (Immanion Press, 2009). Born in Wigan, Lancashire, England, he has worked at the Telegraph & Argus.

== Bibliography ==
=== Novels ===
- Hinterland (Immanion Press, 1 April 2005; paperback ISBN 1-904853-19-6)
- Angelglass (Immanion Press, 15 November 2007; paperback ISBN 978-1-904853-49-7)
- The Janus House and Other Two-Faced Tales (Immanion Press, 24 December 2009; paperback ISBN 978-1-904853-70-1)
- popCULT! (Pendragon Press, 31 March 2011; paperback ISBN 978-1-906864-24-8)
- Gideon Smith and the Mechanical Girl (Tor Books, 10 September 2013, ISBN 978-0-7653-3424-4)
- Gideon Smith and the Brass Dragon (Tor Books, 16 September 2014, ISBN 978-0-7653-3425-1)
- Gideon Smith and the Mask of the Ripper (Tor Books, 14 April 2015, ISBN 978-0-7653-3426-8)
- The Handover (Trapeze, 29 April 2021, ISBN 978-1-3987-0261-5)
- Alien: Colony War (Titan Books, 26 April 2022, ISBN 978-1-789098-89-1)
- Withered Hill (Canelo, 26 September 2024; paperback ISBN 978-1-80436-751-3)
- Scuttler's Cove (Canelo, 13 February 2025; paperback ISBN 978-1-80436-753-7)
- Scratch Moss (Canelo, 5 March 2026; paperback ISBN 978-1-83598-319-5)
- Twisted Pike (Canelo, 1 October 2026; paperback ISBN 978-1-83598-316-4)

=== Short stories ===
- The End of the World Show (Postscripts magazine, published Winter 2006) – giant lizards attacking Tokyo and asteroids and zombies.
- Go (You Are Here, Redbeck Press, September 2006) – about the ghost of Jack Kerouac
- It's Nice But I Wouldn't Want To Die Here (Visionary Tongue magazine, April 2006)
- What Would Nite-Owl Do? (All Saints No Sinners Magazine, 2006)
- State of Grace (Postscripts, PS Publishing, issue ten, Summer 2007)
- Woman's Work (in Encounters of Sherlock Holmes, Titan Books, 2013)

=== Comics ===
Under the pen name "Sax", David Barnett wrote stories for two short story comics. Both featured the open-source character, Jenny Everywhere.

- My Bloody Valentine - Illustrated by John Miers (2002)
- The Death of Jenny Everywhere - Illustrated by Catherine Wright (2003)
