= Albert Newsome =

Novel series by James McCreet

Albert Newsome is a Victorian detective novel series by James McCreet consisting of four books: The Incendiary's Trail (2009), Vice Society (2010), The Thieves' Labyrinth (2011), and The Masked Adversary (2012). The series follows Detective Force's Inspector Albert Newsome.

== The Incendiary's Trail (2009) ==
The Incendiary's Trail was published in July 2009 by Macmillan New Writing. The novel introduces readers to the new Detective Force's Detective Inspector Newsome as he investigates the gruesome murder of conjoined twins, Eliza-Beth, in early Victorian London. To help solve the crime, Newsome blackmails an imprisoned criminal, Noah Dyson, into working with him and Sergeant George Williamson as they search for a master criminal known as the General. Unbeknownst to Newsome and Williamson, Dyson has his own motivations for seeking out the General, which are more aligned with retribution than justice.

Jasmina Svenne, writing for the Historical Novel Society, described The Incendiary's Trail as "an ingeniously plotted novel", noting that "Dickens is clearly a strong influence, from the author's penchant for unusual words to the use of an omniscient, anonymous narrator who claims to be a journalist and therefore can highlight the gap between fiction, journalism and the ‘truth’". The Guardian's Laura Wilson also drew connections to Dickens and concluded the novel is "well worth reading, though the arch authorial voice with its knowing asides [...] does grate after a while".

== Vice Society (2010) ==
Vice Society was published in May 2010 by Macmillan Publishers. In the novel, Sergeant George Williamson has resigned from the Detective Force, though he's drawn to privately and unofficially investigate a series of murders. To solve the mystery, he decides to work alongside Inspector Albert Newsome and former criminal Noah Dyson. As the story unfolds, Williamson becomes convinced that the murders and his wife's supposed suicide are related.

According to reviewer Sarah Hilary, "The story suffers slightly from a surfeit of protagonists," though she found Noah Dyson's character "certainly the most clearly drawn and memorable". Hilary also pointed to "some confusion as to the hierarchy of antagonists and a tendency on McCreet's part to muddy matters with an abundance of narrative conceits."

== The Thieves' Labyrinth (2011) ==
The Thieves' Labyrinth was published by Macmillan in 2011. In the novel, Inspector Albert Newsome has been temporarily demoted to the Thames River Police for his insubordination. He can regain his old position only if he proves himself with good behaviour. Meanwhile, his old enemy, George Williamson, is working as a private detective at the theatres of London, where his job is to catch pickpockets. Both men are highly suspicious of a new face in London: Eldritch Batchem, who claims to be an investigator "By Royal Appointment". Throughout the novel, the three compete to solve seemingly unrelated crimes: an outrageous theft from the city's docks and a mysterious murder on the Waterloo Bridge.

Amanda C. M. Gillies, writing for Euro Crime, called the novel "a fantastic" and "very finely crafted tale". The Historical Novel Society's Marina Oliver discussed how "McCreet knows his Victorian London and portrays it unflinchingly, warts and all". According to Oliver, "The action is fast-paced, [and] the plot convoluted though the authorial interjections echoing Victorian novelists jarred somewhat".

== The Masked Adversary (2012) ==
The Masked Adversary was published by Macmillan in 2012.
