= Jake Lamar =

American writer, novelist, playwright and cultural critic

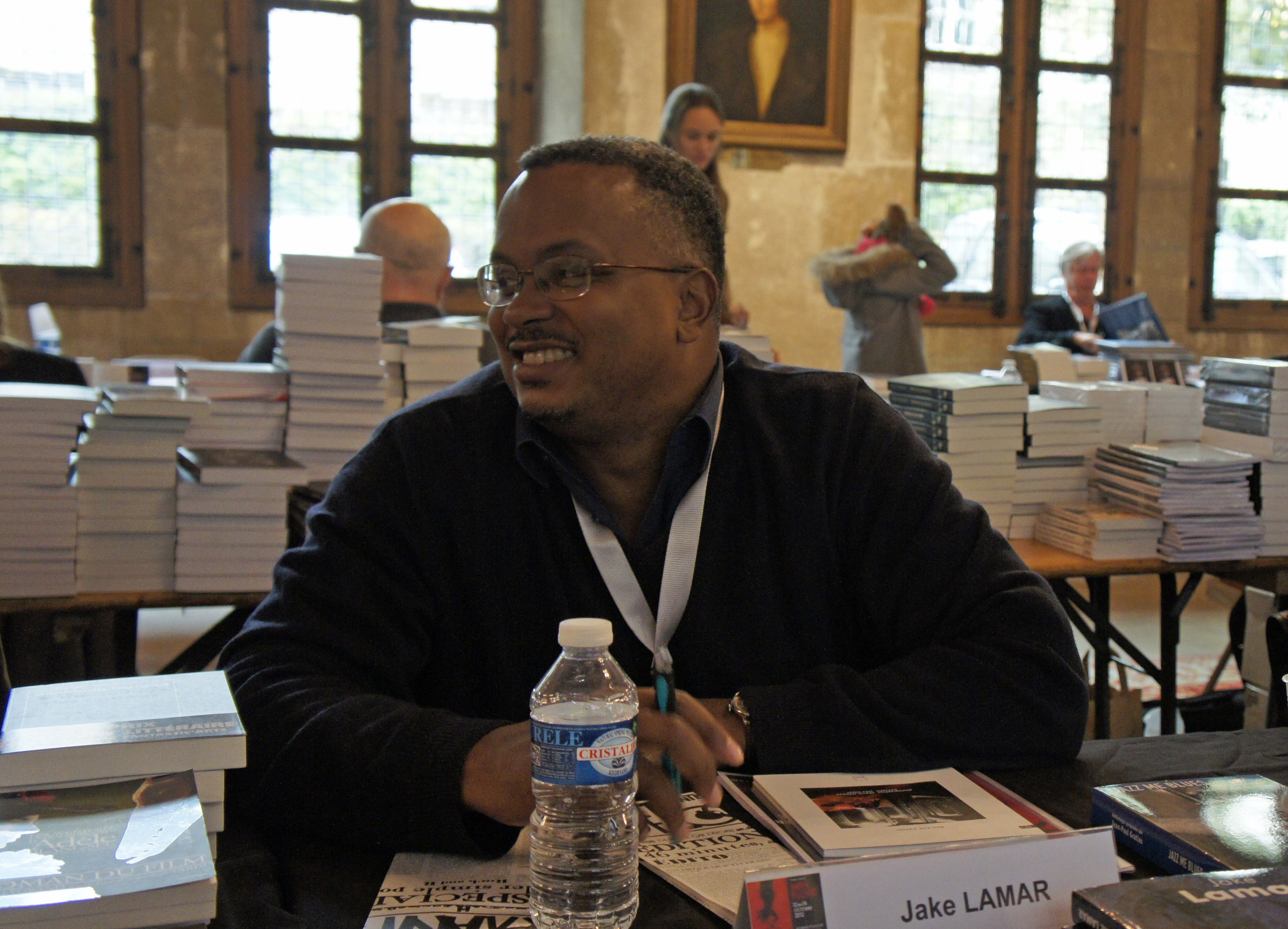
- Jake Lamar signing at the 7th Interpol'Art Festival in Reims, in October 2012.
- Born: 1961 (age 64–65); New York City, U.S.
- Education: Harvard University

Jake Lamar (born in 1961 in The Bronx, New York City) is an African-American writer, novelist, playwright, and cultural critic living in Paris.

After graduating from Harvard University, Lamar spent six years writing for Time magazine. He has lived in Paris since 1993 and teaches creative writing at Sciences Po. At age 30, he published a memoir, Bourgeois Blues, in which he evoked his relationship with his father. With it, he won the Lyndhurst Prize. In 1993, he moved to Paris in the 18th arrondissement where he still resides.

After a near fatal heart problem in 2015, Lamar wrote an article in the Los Angeles Times on the quality of the socialist system of health care in France. His most recent work, Viper's Dream (No Exit Press, 2023) is a crime novel set in the jazz world of Harlem between the years 1936 and 1961. A version of Viper's Dream was broadcast (in French) as a 10-episode radio play in 2019. That production included many jazz tracks of the period. Viper's Dream was published in French as a novel by Rivages/Noir in 2021. Viper's Dream was published in the US by Crooked Lane Books in 2023.

In July 2024, Viper's Dream received the Crime Writers' Association Historical Dagger Award.

In December 2024, Das schwarze Chamäleon, the German translation of his novel If 6 Were 9, won the German Crime Fiction Award, Deutscher Krimipreis, in the international category.

In 2025, Viper's Dream was shortlisted for the Mystery Writers of Japan Award in the Fiction in Translation category.

== Fiction in English ==
- Bourgeois Blues (Summit Books 1991)
- The Last Integrationist (Crown 1996)
- Close to the Bone (Crown 1999)
- If 6 Were 9 (Crown 2001)
- Rendezvous Eighteenth (Minotaur 2003)
- Ghosts of Saint-Michel (Minotaur 2006)
- Viper's Dream (No Exit Press 2023)

== Fiction in French ==
- Le caméléon noir (Rivages/Noir 2003)
- Nous avions un rêve (Rivages/Noir 2005)
- New York Transfer (Biro 2007)
- Rendez-vous dans le 18ème (Rivages/Thriller 2007)
- Les Fantômes de Saint-Michel (Rivages/Thriller 2009)
- Confessions d'un fils modèle (Payot/Rivages 2009)
- Postérité (Rivages 2014)
- Viper's Dream (Rivages/Noir 2021)

== Plays ==
- Brothers in Exile
- Brothers in Exile (radio play)
- Viper's Dream (radio play)

== Awards ==
- Deutscher Krimipreis, 2024 (for his novel If 6 Were 9)
- Crime Writers' Association Historical Dagger Award, 2024 (for his novel Viper's Dream)
- Lyndhurst Prize
- Centre National du Livre grant (for his novel Postérité)
- France's Grand Prize for best foreign thriller (for his novel The Last Integrationist)
- Beaumarchais fellowship (for his play Brothers in Exile)
