= Michael Bhaskar =

British writer, researcher and publisher

Michael Bhaskar is a British writer, researcher and publisher.

His first book, The Content Machine: Towards a Theory of Publishing from the Printing Press to the Digital Network (Anthem Press, 2013), is an academic exploration of the past, present and future of the publishing industry.

His second book Curation: The power of selection in a world of excess (Piatkus/Little, Brown, 2016) is business-oriented non-fiction, an analysis of how to prosper when facing information overload. It looks at how the idea of curation moved from museums and art galleries to the Internet and business.

He collaborated with Mustafa Suleyman to publish the book The Coming Wave, Technology, Power and the 21st Century's Greatest Dilemma. It was shortlisted for the 2023 Financial Times Business Book of the Year Award.

He is also co-founder of Canelo, a digital publisher.
