= Stasi Child =

Novel by David Young

- First edition
- Author: David Young
- Language: English
- Publisher: twenty7 Books
- Publication date: 2016
- Media type: Print, ebook
- ISBN: 978-1-78577-006-7
- Followed by: Stasi Wolf

Stasi Child is a novel by David Young which won the 2016 CWA Endeavour Historical Dagger for the best historical crime novel of the year. It was also longlisted for the 2016 Theakston's Old Peculier Crime Novel of the Year Award.

== Plot ==
The novel is set in East Germany in the mid-seventies and follows a double-stranded narrative. The main story is told in third-person through the eyes of Volkspolizei detective Oberleutnant Karin Müller, who is investigating the murder of a teenage girl found in a cemetery in East Berlin, apparently having been shot by western guards while attempting to escape into the East. Müller's ‘handler’ is Stasi lieutenant colonel Klaus Jäger who warns her the investigation is limited to identifying the girl – not challenging the official version of the killing. Müller disregards this warning, and her story eventually coincides with a first-person narrative told in the present tense by Irma Behrendt. Irma is an inmate of a severe Jugendwerkhof housed in the former Nazi holiday complex of Prora on the island of Rügen. Although the plotlines converge, Young keeps the narratives separate through the climax of the book in the Harz mountains, right through to the epilogue. Crime fiction expert and author Barry Forshaw said that while the story has echoes of Tom Rob Smith and Philip Kerr, ‘Young has a notably individual voice’. (3)

== Reception ==
Marcel Berlins, in choosing the novel as Crime Book of the Month in The Times, said Young "provides a good story and strong characters, and is particularly successful ... in portraying the mood of East Germans at the time – fear yet pride."
