= Gillian Linscott =

British author (born 1944)

- Born: September 27, 1944 (age 81); Windsor, England
- Occupation: Author
- Partner: Anthony Joseph Vincent Geraghty
- Writing career
- Genre: Mystery
- Notable awards: The Ellis Peters Historical Dagger; The Herodotus Award for the Best International Historical Mystery Novel

Gillian Linscott (born 27 September 1944) is a British author and former journalist. She studied at Somerville College, Oxford.

She worked as a journalist for the Liverpool Daily Post, Birmingham Post, The Guardian and BBC, before becoming a novelist, specialising in crime writing. Her novel Absent Friends won the 2000 British Crime Writers' Association prize The Ellis Peters Historical Dagger.

She is married to author Tony Geraghty and lives in Herefordshire.

== Bibliography ==
- A Healthy Body (1984)
- Murder Makes Tracks (1985)
- Knightfall (1986)
- A Whiff Of Sulphur (1987)
- Unknown Hand (1988)
- Murder, I Presume (1990)
- Sister Beneath the Sheet (1991)
- Hanging on the Wire (1992)
- Stage Fright (1993)
- Widow's Peak (1994) (a.k.a. An Easy Day for a Lady)
- Crown Witness (1995)
- Dead Man's Music (1996) (a.k.a. Dead Man's Sweetheart)
- Dance On Blood (1998)
- Absent Friends (1999)
- The Perfect Daughter (2000)
- Dead Man Riding (2002)
- The Garden (2003)
- Blood On The Wood (2003)

=== Caro Peacock ===
Linscott writes the Liberty Lane detective/mystery series using the pen name Caro Peacock.

1. Death At Dawn (2007) (ISBN 0007244193), in the US as A Foreign Affair (ISBN 0061445894), and in Italy as Morte all'alba (ISBN 8862510195)
2. Death of a Dancer (2008) (ISBN 0007244207), in the US as A Dangerous Affair (ISBN 006144748X)
3. A Corpse in Shining Armour (2009) (ISBN 0007244231), in the US as A Family Affair (ISBN 0061447498)
4. When the Devil Drives (2011) (ISBN 178029011X)
5. Keeping Bad Company (2012) (ISBN 1780290209)
6. The Path of the Wicked (2013) (ISBN 1780290411)
7. Friends in High Places (2015) (ISBN 0727885057)

== Prizes ==
- The Ellis Peters Historical Dagger, 2000, for Absent Friends
- The Herodotus Award for the Best International Historical Mystery Novel (2000), for Absent Friends
