= Belle Reve Farm =

Horse farm in Kentucky owned by William Shatner

Coordinates: 38.0451°N 84.6752°W

Belle Reve Farm (original)
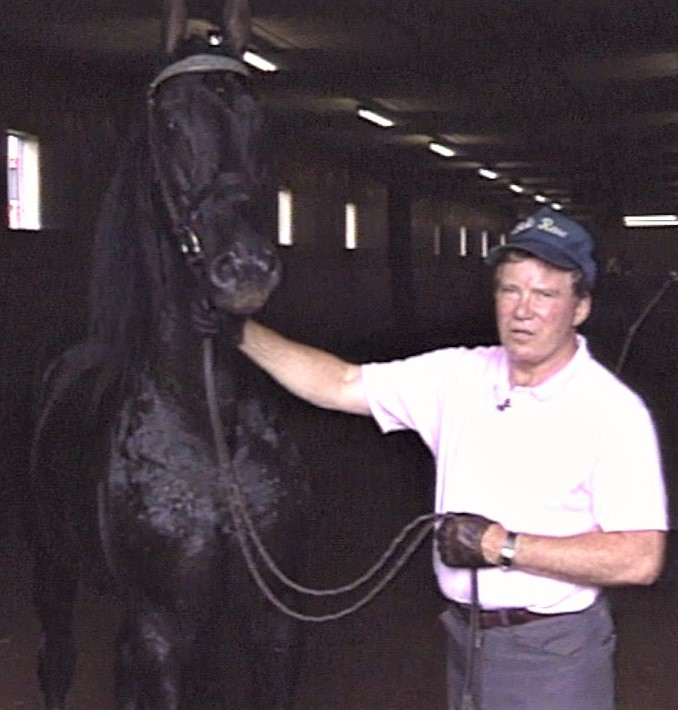
- William Shatner and Sultan's Great Day at Belle Reve Farm, 1993
- Town/City: 13 mi west of Lexington
- State: Kentucky
- Province: Woodford County
- Country: United States
- Established: 1985
- Disestablished: 1999
- Owner: William Shatner
- Area: 76 acres (31 ha)
- Produces: American Saddlebred horses
- Status: private

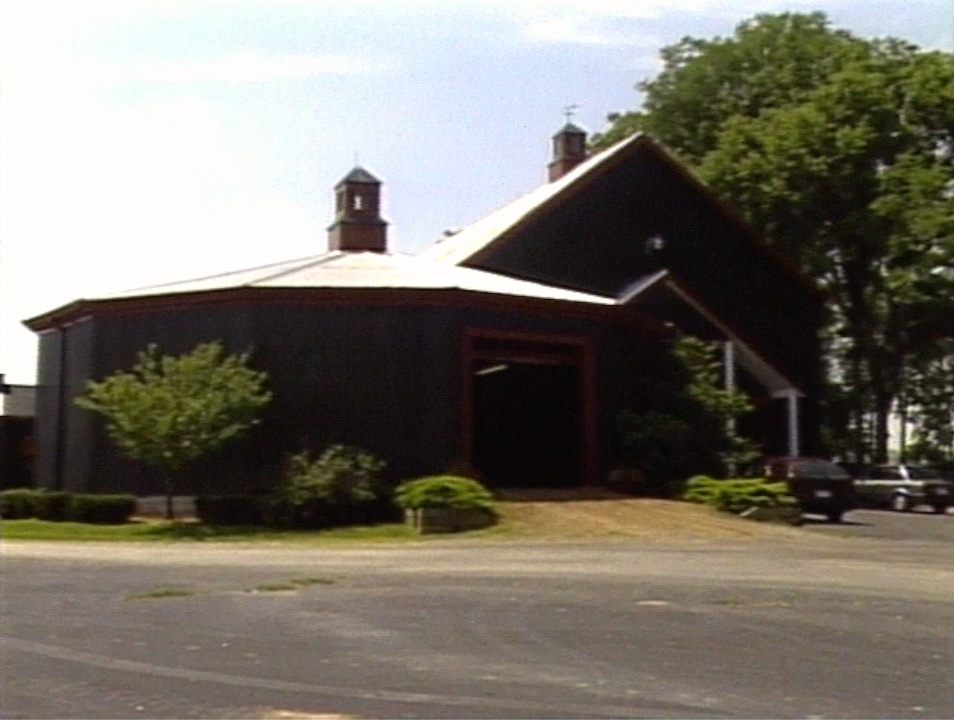
Barns located near the entrance, 1993

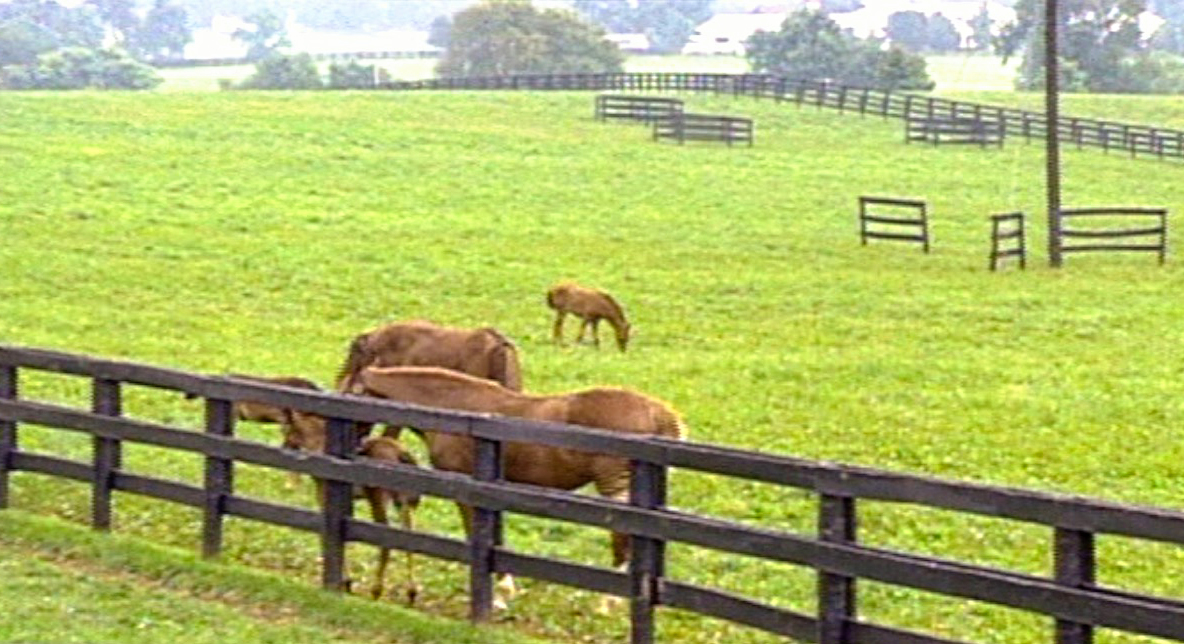
A turnout paddock at Belle Reve Farm, 1993

Belle Reve Farm is a horse farm located in Versailles, Kentucky that was owned by actor William Shatner, a breeder of American Saddlebred show horses.

His stallion Sultan's Great Day was a two-time world's champion performer, and the farm's premier breeding stallion until his death in 2004. Great Day sired 95 foals that have won 342 ribbons at the World's Championship Horse Show in Louisville, KY. Great Day was named Saddle Horse Report’s leading sire of world's champions in 1994 and 1996, and was a Top 10 sire throughout his career.

== History ==
Belle Reve Farm is the name of two horse farms in Woodford County, Kentucky, near Versailles, Kentucky, that were owned by actor William Shatner. The name Belle Reve is French for "beautiful dream", only grammatically incorrect (since "rêve" is masculine, it should be "beau rêve").

Shatner had been interested in horses since the age of 15, when he would ride at a rental stable near his home in Montreal. He rode in roles in multiple films, including White Comanche, The Bastard, and bareback in Alexander the Great. He and his wife Marcy Lafferty Shatner bought an 18-acre (7.3 ha) horse-breeding farm in Three Rivers, California, in 1979, that she named Belle Reve Ranch; they used it for Quarter Horses.

Shatner became fascinated by American Saddlebred horses in 1983, when filming an episode of his television series T.J. Hooker in a barn where several were stabled. He referred to encountering saddlebreds as "a religious experience", and a "love affair", and bought two of them that same day. When he later sought to buy more, the California seller referred him to a friend in Kentucky, horse breeder and trainer Donna Moore. Under Moore's direction, Shatner acquired the champion black American Saddlebred stallion Sultan's Great Day after seeing him at the Los Angeles Equestrian Center in 1985. Later that same year, the Shatners bought Moore's 87-acre (35 ha) farm on Shannon Run Road in Versailles, Kentucky, to raise Sultan's Great Day and his other horses, and kept Moore on to manage it. In 1992, Shatner purchased the Weber farm comprising 141 acres (57 ha) on Dry Ridge Pike.

In 1993, the colt barn at the farm caught fire and five horses were killed. In 1995, Shatner divorced Marcy Lafferty and as part of the divorce settlement, Shatner was awarded Belle Reve Farm, and Lafferty was awarded annual breedings to Belle Reve's standing stallions. Lafferty set up her own nearby ranch named Poser Farm, where she owned and bred from Belle Reve's Voodoo Magic, a foal of Sultan's Great Day.

In July 1999, Shatner sold the Shannon Run Road farm for approximately US$500,000 to the owner of Came the Son, another foal of Sultan's Great Day; she renamed it Rigby's Green. In 2007, it was sold again and renamed Diamond View. Shatner kept the name Belle Reve Farm, and moved it to a larger farm he bought, also in Woodford County near Versailles.

In 2001, Shatner remarried horse trainer Elizabeth Anderson Martin. They divided their time raising Saddlebreds at the 360 acres (150 ha) Belle Reve Farm, and Quarter Horses in Los Angeles. In 2012, Belle Reve was part of a therapeutic riding program that benefits Horses for Heroes. Donna Moore died in 2014. In 2019, the Shatners divorced, splitting four horses, with Elizabeth keeping the Versailles home, and William Shatner keeping the Three Rivers ranch, and "all horse semen".

== Horses ==
The farm breeds American Saddlebreds and Quarter Horses, which are exhibited in horse shows. The stallion roster includes the Champion Saddlebred, Call Me Ringo, who performed in harness at the 2010 Alltech FEI World Equestrian Games in Lexington. A former stallion was Sultan's Great Day. Sultan's Great Day was the premier American Saddlebred that stood at Belle Reve. He sired many champion performance horses, such as Great Day's Token, 1992 Junior Exhibitor Five-Gaited World's Grand Champion, Royal Scot's Curtain Call, a grand gaited mare, Simply Mahvalous, 1989 Three-Year-Old Fine Harness National Futurity World's Champion, Day By Day B.R., 1989 Two-Year-Old Five-Gaited World's Champion, and Royce, 1989 Kentucky Futurity Two-Year-Old Fine Harness World's Champion.
