= The Information Officer =

2009 novel by Mark Mills

- First edition
- Author: Mark Mills
- Language: English
- Publisher: HarperCollins
- Publication date: April 2009
- Publication place: United Kingdom
- Media type: Print
- Pages: 400
- ISBN: 0-00-727686-9

The Information Officer is the third novel by English author Mark Mills, published in 2009 by HarperCollins.

== Plot introduction ==
Set in 1942 in Malta during World War II, the story concerns Max Chadwick whose task as Information Officer was to ensure the news the islanders receive maintains morale. But then he is shown evidence that a British submarine officer is raping and murdering local women, and determines to track down the killer himself amidst the increasing devastation caused by the German bombing raids during the so-called Siege of Malta.

== Reception ==
The novel was widely praised :-

- Laura Wilson writing in The Guardian concluded "A compelling, vividly rendered slow burn of a book which culminates in an electrifying climax."
- Daniel Mallory in the Los Angeles Times wrote, "a novel so triumphantly old-fashioned, so double-upholstered with the stuff of classics, it reads like the story of "Casablanca" revisited, like a vanished Graham Greene...this utterly ravishing third novel seethes with femmes fatale and double agents."
- Marilyn Stasio in The New York Times was also full of praise "the sense of immediacy Mark Mills brings to The Information Officer is so intense that this breathtaking novel reads more like a memoir than a wartime thriller."
- Muriel Dobbin in The Washington Times was struck by the historicity of the novel: Mark Mills "skilfully combines grim historical reality with murder in this tautly gripping mystery. His characters are deftly drawn and highlight the drama of their setting" and he "stays ahead of his readers as the plot follows its complex course, and he scatters his clues, including one notable red herring. Most memorably, his historical research offers a reminder of an often-forgotten fragment of a war."
