= Sultan's Great Day =

American Saddlebred stallion

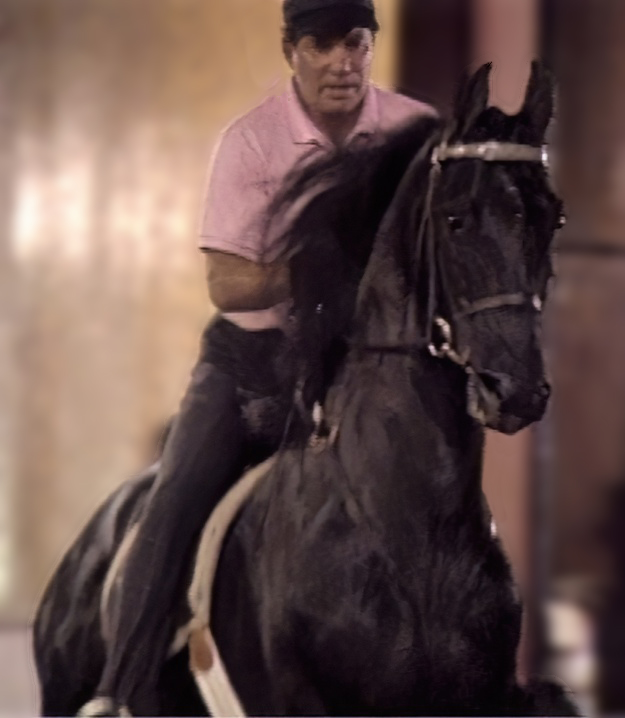
- William Shatner riding Sultan's Great Day in 1993
- Breed: American Saddlebred
- Sire: Supreme Sultan
- Grandsire: Valley View Supreme
- Dam: Supremes Casindra
- Maternal grandsire: Stonewall Supreme
- Sex: Stallion
- Foaled: March 22, 1981 – March 22, 2004
- Color: Black
- Breeder: Mrs. Hymel Fishkin
- Owner: William Shatner
- Trainer: Royce Cates

Major wins
- World's Champion Two-Year-Old Fine Harness Stallion/Gelding

Sultan's Great Day (March 22, 1981 – March 22, 2004) was a black American Saddlebred stallion sired by Supreme Sultan, out of the mare Supremes Cassandra. Great Day, as he was commonly called, was a twice World's Champion Fine Harness Stallion. In his debut performance, he earned the title 1983 2-year-old World's Champion fine harness stallion. Other prestigious wins followed during his 2 and 3 year old years. He was retired to stud at the age of 4, but was shown a few more times in later years. Great Day was referred to as "one of the most prolific sires of world's champions throughout the 1990s". He sired 387 registered offspring of which 106 were ribbon winners, 63 were futurity ribbon winners, and 24 went on to become champions in their respective disciplines.

== Early life and performance career ==
Sultan's Great Day 76479 was foaled March 22, 1981. The breeder of record is Mrs. Hymel Fishkin of Gibsonia, Pennsylvania. His sire was Supreme Sultan, and his dam was the mare Supremes Casindra by Stonewall Supreme. His haircoat was a deep black color, as were his mane and tail.

Great Day made his performance debut as a two-year-old competing in fine harness competition He was sold after his title of champion to Donna Moore for Linda Johnson. Sultan was purchased by William Shatner after he won his second World's Championship Horse Show. He then started living at Belle Reve Farm.

Shatner commented on Sultan's Great Day, “Great Day is to me what a Rodin statue is to an art collector, except that this work of art is alive.” Shatner said "the magnificent part of owning horses is breeding horses." Sultan's Great Day was bred to champion Saddlebred mares, and produced champions.

== Breeding and offspring ==
William Shatner narrative about breeding Sultan's Great Day

Sultan's Great Day became a breeding stallion at age 4 under the management and supervision of Donna Moore. Among Donna's top breeding selections were daughters of New Yorker, a widely recognized sire of champion Saddlebreds.

During his breeding career, Sultan's Great Day sired 106 Kentucky State Fair World's Championship Horse Show ribbon winners with 454 ribbons (1st-8th), 24 champions, and 63 futurity ribbon winners. The Kentucky State Fair World's Championship Horse Show is said to be the same "to saddlebreds in August what Churchill Downs is to thoroughbreds in May."

== Pedigree ==
Sultan's Great Day's grandsire, Valley View Supreme is the only stallion ever to become Three Gaited World Grand Champion.

Pedigree of Sultan's Great Day
Sire Supreme Sultan	Valley View Supreme	Genius Bourbon King	Bourbon Genius
Sire Supreme Sultan	Valley View Supreme	Genius Bourbon King	Blessed Event
Sire Supreme Sultan	Valley View Supreme	Diana Gay	The Genius
Sire Supreme Sultan	Valley View Supreme	Diana Gay	Lady Alice
Sire Supreme Sultan	Melody Olee	Anacacho Denmark	Edna Mays King
Sire Supreme Sultan	Melody Olee	Anacacho Denmark	Jane Black
Sire Supreme Sultan	Melody Olee	Judy Olee	Leatherwood King
Sire Supreme Sultan	Melody Olee	Judy Olee	Aces Orchid
Dam Supremes Casindra	Stonewall Supreme	Stonewall King	My King
Dam Supremes Casindra	Stonewall Supreme	Stonewall King	Glorian
Dam Supremes Casindra	Stonewall Supreme	Mamie Peavine	Richmond Choice
Dam Supremes Casindra	Stonewall Supreme	Mamie Peavine	Queen
Dam Supremes Casindra	Casindra Beaverkettle	Denmark Beaverkettle	Admiral Denmark
Dam Supremes Casindra	Casindra Beaverkettle	Denmark Beaverkettle	Mary Flowers
Dam Supremes Casindra	Casindra Beaverkettle	Candace Kalarama	Kalarama Rex
Dam Supremes Casindra	Casindra Beaverkettle	Candace Kalarama	Jean Bohemian
