= Macmillan New Writing =

- Parent company: Pan Macmillan
- Country of origin: United Kingdom
- Headquarters location: Basingstoke, Hampshire, England
- Distribution: Worldwide
- Fiction genres: Science fiction Historical fiction Romantic fiction

Macmillan New Writing is an imprint of the British publishing company Pan Macmillan. Designed to attract previously unpublished authors, it offers aspiring novelists 20% of royalties from the sale of their book but no advance on signing. Books Macmillan New Writing has published have been shortlisted for the Orange Prize for Fiction, the CWA New Blood Dagger, the Edgar Award for best paperback original, the Romantic Novelists' Association's Romantic Novel of the Year, and the Wales Book of the Year.

== A partial list of authors ==
- Conor Corderoy
- MFW Curran
- Maggie Dana
- Aliya Whiteley
- Jonathan Drapes
- Michael Stephen Fuchs
- Frances Garrood
- Eliza Graham
- Ryan David Jahn
- Lucy McCarraher
- James McCreet
- Brian McGilloway
- Roger Morris (English writer)
- Suroopa Mukherjee
- L C Tyler
- Doug Worgul
