= The Lost Son (film) =

1999 film by Chris Menges

- UK theatrical release poster
- Directed by: Chris Menges
- Written by: Eric Leclere; Margaret Leclere; Mark Mills
- Produced by: Finola Dwyer
- Starring: Daniel Auteuil; Ciarán Hinds; Katrin Cartlidge
- Cinematography: Barry Ackroyd
- Edited by: Luc Barnier; Pamela Power
- Music by: Goran Bregović
- Production companies: The Film Consortium; Canal+
- Distributed by: United International Pictures (United Kingdom); BAC Films (France)
- Release date: 25 June 1999 (United Kingdom)
- Running time: 102 minutes
- Countries: United Kingdom; France
- Languages: English; French
- Budget: $10 million

The Lost Son is a 1999 crime drama starring French actor Daniel Auteuil and set in London. It was directed by Chris Menges.

== Plot ==
Xavier Lombard is a Parisian private detective based in London. His best friend is Nathalie, a high-class call girl. He gets a telephone call from an old friend in the Paris police department, now a businessman whose brother-in-law is missing. The missing man's parents hire Xavier over their daughter's objections, and he quickly finds himself caught up in the underworld of child sex slavery. He guesses that the lost son is dead and shifts his focus to finding and breaking this lucrative business of child trafficking. He gets a reluctant Nathalie to hunt "the Austrian", the shadowy head of the child sex ring. Violence erupts quickly, and Xavier soon has little more to lose.

== Cast ==
- Daniel Auteuil as Lombard
- Marianne Denicourt as Nathalie
- Nastassja Kinski as Deborah
- Katrin Cartlidge as Emily
- Ciarán Hinds as Carlos
- Bruce Greenwood as Alex Friedman
- Billie Whitelaw as Mrs Spitz
- Cyril Shaps as Mr. Spitz
- Jamie Harris as Hopper
- Cal Macaninch as Martin
- Hemal Pandya as Shiva
- Billy Smyth as "Boy #6"

== Reception ==
The film opened in the UK on 25 June 1999 on 24 screens and grossed £15,059 in its opening weekend.

DVD Verdict panned the film, writing "The Lost Son has its heart in the right place, but it fumbles the ball by presenting an idea with great potential in a fairly lackluster package. There is not enough substance here to make the film worthy of a purchase." The Herald was mixed in their review, stating that Menges "handles the unpleasant aspects in Eric and Margaret Leclere's script with tact" but that the film had too many unbelievable moments.
