= Azim Premji University =

University in Bangalore, India

- Motto in English: towards a just, equitable, humane and sustainable society.
- Type: Private
- Established: 2010
- Founder: Azim Premji
- Parent institution: Azim Premji Foundation
- Affiliations: UGC
- Chancellor: Azim Premji
- Vice-Chancellor: Richa Govil
- Total staff: 415
- Students: 2190
- Undergraduates: 1309
- Postgraduates: 881
- Location: Bengaluru - Burugunte Village, Survey No 66, Bikkanahalli Main Rd, Sarjapura, Bengaluru, Karnataka 562125 12.846905°N 77.776240°E Bhopal - Khasra number 40 and 51, Bhopal - Vidisha Bypass road, Village Kanhasaiya Tehsil Huzur, Bhopal, Madhya Pradesh 462022
- Campus: 110 acres; Residential
- Website: azimpremjiuniversity.edu.in

Azim Premji University is a private university, located in Bengaluru, Karnataka, India. It was founded in 2010 and is named after Azim Premji, an Indian businessman and philanthropist who was chairman of Wipro Limited. The university offers undergraduate and postgraduate programmes and several short-term diplomas and certificate courses. It claims that its curriculum is designed to contribute to the social sector in India.

A second Azim Premji University campus opened in Bhopal Madhya Pradesh in July 2023.

The third campus will come up in Ranchi, Jharkhand, while fourth will be at Palashbari, Assam.

== History ==
The university was established by the Azim Premji Foundation, a non-profit organization founded in 2001. The university was set up under the Azim Premji University Act (2010) and recognised by the University Grants Commission under section 2F.

Anurag Behar was the founding Vice-Chancellor of the university. Richa Govil is the current Vice-Chancellor of the university. Gautam Pandey is the Vice-Chancellor of the university in Bhopal.

Initially, the university offered just two programmes in Education and Development, along with courses for working professionals.

Now it offers postgraduate degrees in Education, Development, Economics and Public Health, undergraduate degrees in Economics, Social Science, Biology, Chemistry, Environmental Science and Sustainability, Information Sciences, Mathematics, Physics, English, History and Philosophy.

It also offers dual degree in science and teacher education.

It has nearly 150 short courses for professionals, in education, development, policy and governance.

== Campus ==
The university functioned out of a campus in Bengaluru's Electronic City from inception to 2020. It then moved to its own campus of 90 acres in Bengaluru's Sarjapur-Attibele Road. This campus has classrooms and residential facilities for students and guests. It includes a library, seminar halls, amphitheatre, outdoor playfields and indoor sports complex.

One of the eleven Azim Premji Schools in India is located within this campus.

The library at the campus is spread over 43,837 sq ft and is open to the public.

=== Library ===
The library is spread over 43,837 square feet and is a part of a network of Azim Premji Foundation libraries around the country which serves students and members of the Foundation. All Foundation and University libraries are open to the public. Registered external membership is provided for individuals, organisations, and University partners who are scholars, researchers, and activists working on focus areas of the University's work.

==== Bhopal Campus ====
The Bhopal campus is spread over 50 acres and became functional in 2023.

The campus is a sustainable campus whose design was inspired from various local architectural styles of Madhya Pradesh. Said to be one of the few in India, it has an extensive water conservation system facilitating conservation of rainwater and a 50 kilo litre water treatment facility. The University campus is designed for barrier-free access to all the facilities by persons with disabilities. Hostel blocks have rooms designed to ease wheelchair movement. The academic blocks have restrooms on each floor that are designed in such a way that persons with disabilities can use them with ease.

=== Azim Premji Schools ===
One among the nine Azim Premji Schools set up by the Foundation is housed on the campus. Like the other Azim Premji Schools, it is free of cost and welcomes children from disadvantaged backgrounds while being open to all. Currently, it has classes up to primary but will eventually, serve K-12 children between 3 and 18 years of age. The medium of instruction is English and there is a significant focus on health and nutrition.

== Academics ==
=== Academic Programs ===
The university offers 4-year undergraduate degrees in BA and BSc for humanities and sciences respectively. The BSc programmes include Biology, Chemistry, Physics, Mathematics, Information Science, Environmental Science & Sustainability, and Psychology while the BA include History, English, Social Science, Economics, Philosophy, and Philosophy, Political Science, and Economics (PPE). Till 2024, the University provided a BSc + BEd dual degree programme for the major science programmes. Furthermore, every student has to pick an Occupational Minor as well.

It also offers postgraduate degrees in Education, Development, Economics and Public Health.

The university has a number of diploma programmes and certificate courses on subject areas such as Research for Social Action, Exploring Sustainability in the Indian context, Mapping and Geographical Information Systems using Quantum GIS, Perspectives on Public Education System, etc.

== Research ==
Research in Azim Premji University is primarily focused on social sciences. The emphasis of the research is on contributing to practice on the ground in India's vast social sector and on high-quality academic scholarship in the areas of development, education, public policy, governance, sustainability, and equity. The university has a Research Funding Programme supported by the Foundation to strengthen and supplement existing efforts in these areas.

=== Centre for Climate Change and Sustainability ===
The centre seeks to strengthen India's response to the climate crisis. Set up in 2019, the centre uses research, education, and sustainability actions to address the challenges of climate change. This includes research on climate change and urban sustainability, publication of books, research papers, and popular articles as well as the fostering of research-based climate action through an annual call for external research proposals on climate change and sustainability. Recent publications include Cities and Canopies: Trees in Indian Cities, Where have all our Gunda thopes gone.

The centre recently released the report titled ‘Navigating India's Climate Future: Climate Projections for India (2021-2040)’. The report published on 17 November 2024, uses two Intergovernmental Panel on Climate Change (IPCC) scenarios—“moderate emissions and adaptation” (SSP2-4.5) and “high emissions with heavy fossil fuel reliance” (SSP5-8.5)—to extrapolate “how extreme weather events, like heat waves, droughts, and intense rainfall, could affect communities, agriculture, and natural resources”.

=== Centre for Sustainable Employment ===
Established in 2017, the centre aims at generating and supporting research in the areas of job creation, employment, and sustainable livelihoods. The centre conducts primary surveys exploring a range of labour market issues including measurement of work, discrimination in the labour market, the impact of COVID-19 on workers, NREGA and the Urban Employment Guarantee Scheme. SWI 2018, the first State of Working India (SWI) report, provided a comprehensive overview of India's labour market. SWI 2019 put together four policy papers to examine the possibilities for employment creation through an urban job guarantee programme and universal basic services provisioning while demonstrating the scope for fiscal expansion and the imperative need for a well-articulated industrial policy. SWI 2021 looked at the devastating impact of the pandemic on India's labour market including the disproportionate impact on women and young workers and the implications for poverty and inequality in the country. State of Working India 2026 was released in March 2026. The report focussed on Youth in the Labour Market. Their journeys from learning to earning. The University said "The report traces the journey of a young worker — from education to job search and employment, and how this transition has evolved over the last 40 years. We hope the report will lay out some of the foundational work that will contribute to a better understanding of the challenges in this transition and enable coordinated policymaking."

=== Centre for Local Democracy ===
The centre, set up in 2020, engages in multiple areas of action, including research grants; a local democracy pilot project in Jharkhand initiated to create and disseminate inspiring stories of local democracy in practice and offering a Continuing Education Programme, ‘Local Democracy: Theory Policy and Practice’.

== Student life ==
The University has many clubs and events for students to explore their interests.

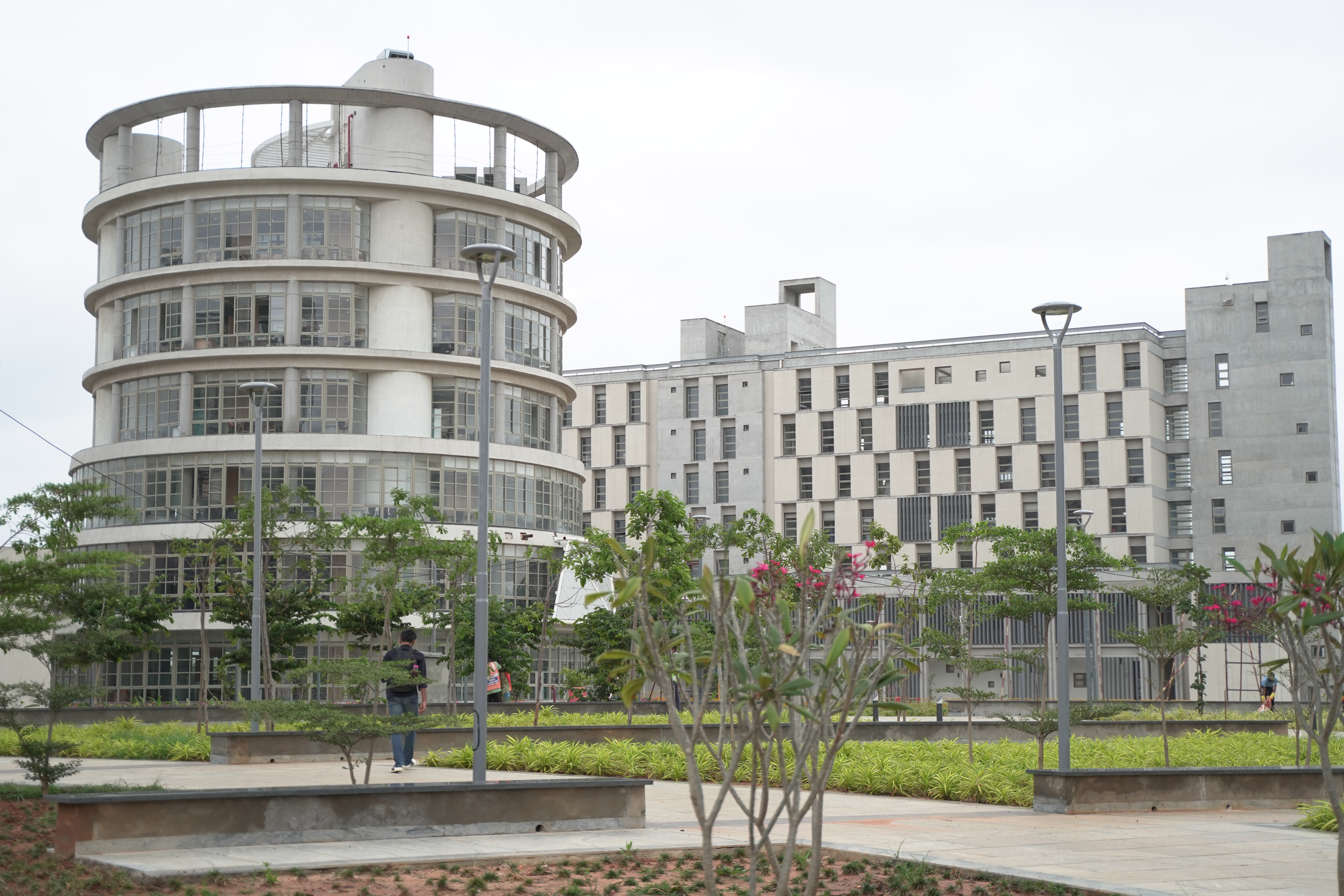
Azim Premji University Campus, Bengaluru

- Unmukt is the University's main annual three-day cultural festival. Apart from this there are many other exhibitions, festivals and celebrations.
- Students pursue their interests through various clubs like music, sports, photography, cinema, theatre, poetry as well as clubs for subjects like maths, biology, physics etc.
- The university also offers academic and language support for students in need during the summer program(which is usually the start of the academic year).
- Through Community Engagement Initiative, students engage with social causes ranging from the education of disadvantaged children, working with the community surrounding the campus, environmental concerns, blood donation camps etc.
- The “Kaapi Aur Charcha” series invites practitioners from various fields to engage in informal talks with the students.
- Publications: Student publications “Karvan” and “Student Journal of Education and Development”.

== Alumni ==
Over 4382 students have graduated from the university. They work at 500 locations across the country, and many work at the grassroots. Many alumni have gone on to start their own social enterprises.

Many undergraduate programme alumni have gone on to study at universities like Stanford University, London School of Economics, TISS, NCBS, IISER etc.

Notable alumni include

- Alina Alam
- Dharamjeet Kumar
- Ram Prakash Krishnan
- Satendrasingh Lilhare

== Faculty ==
Many of the faculty at the university are graduates of top universities from across the world like JNU, Delhi University, Cornell University, University of Massachusetts etc.

A few notable faculty names:

- Harini Nagendra
- Amit Basole
- Amman Madan
- Arjun Jaydev
- Varuni Bhatia

=== Publications ===
Azim Premji University publications, magazines for school education are available online and in print. They are all focussed on promoting dialogue among school teachers, practitioners and educationists on current discourses and perspectives on education, classroom pedagogy, research and on-ground experiences.

iWonder...is a triannual science magazine for primary and middle school teachers. It is published in three languages, English, Kannada and Hindi.

At Right Angles is a triannual magazine for primary and middle school teachers. It is a resource for school mathematics, published in three languages, English, Kannada and Hindi.

Pathshala Bheetar aur Baahar is a quarterly publication in Hindi and translated into English and Kannada. It is on school education in general, school and classroom experiences, and explores issues within the confluence of education and society.

== Translations ==
Among the largest of such initiatives in the country, the Translations Initiative, Anuvada Sampada, facilitates the reach of high-quality learning material in higher education to graduate and PG students in Indian languages (currently, Hindi and Kannada). The initiative has a network of 450 translators in 20 leading academic institutions. The belief that led to this initiative is that the availability of quality resources in Indian languages will support students to engage more deeply and thoroughly with concepts and ideas in higher education.

=== The Schoolbooks Archive ===
The Schoolbooks Archive, launched November 2021, is a free, open-access, digital collection of 5,724 items, schoolbooks and related documents, dating as far back as 1819, from various regions of South Asia. The archive covers books in all languages and all school subjects that have been written and/or published in the Indian Subcontinent – India and neighbouring South Asian countries. As part of this initiative, a physical exhibition is being held in different parts of the country.
