= Sophy Rickett =

British artist

Sophy Rickett (born 22 September 1970) is a visual artist, working with photography and video/sound installation. She lives and works in London.

== Career ==
Sophy Rickett was born in London. Between 1990 and 1993, she studied for a BA (Hons) in Photography at London College of Printing, London. Her work came to prominence in the late 1990s, following her graduation from The Royal College of Art, London in the Summer of 1999.

One of her earliest works, Vauxhall Bridge, depicted Rickett urinating standing up while attired in expensive feminine clothes, against the backdrop of Terry Farrell's iconic SIS building at Vauxhall Cross. It was reviewed in Creative Camera magazine in 1996. Some people saw the "Pissing Women" series as a satire of male behaviour, though many did not know the women were genuinely urinating. Sophy Rickett stated in the interview "this was something I did," and the photographs were not manipulated.

Rickett has also made several books, most recently - "The Death of a Beautiful Subject", GOST books 2015, and "THE CURIOUS MOANING OF KENFIG BURROWS", 2019.

== Auditorium and To The River ==
Like her photography, Rickett's video work has a strong conceptual element. Her first major film installation, Auditorium (2007), was a response to the architecture of Glyndebourne Opera House. It explores the material reality of an industrial space that exists to create illusions. More than 70 hours of footage shot over 10 days were pared down to a 20-minute film with a score by British composer Ed Hughes. Nicolass Till, who writes frequently on the opera, says that it presents the stage as "a space of revelation that at the same time implies a concealed other."

To The River (2011) is a multi-screen video installation with 12 channels of sound. Filmed during the spring equinox of 2010 on the bank of the River Severn, To The River depicts small crowds of people gathered to wait for the Severn bore to pass. Filming was done mainly at night. The video installation consists of three screens set at different points in a gallery, two on separate walls, and one spanning a corner. Surround sound from the audio tracks was played at several points in the ceiling. The audio captured fragments of conversations between the spectators waiting for the river to rise, "a collection of very human stories that touch upon mistakes, failure, desire, loss, ambivalence and resentment... a prolonged encounter with the momentary reversal in the flow of things."

Auditorium was commissioned by Photoworks and Glyndebourne Opera, and To The River was commissioned by film producer Elena Hill in partnership with Arnolfini and ArtSway. Both projects were supported by grants, and both resulted in publications, from Photoworks and Arnolfini.

== Exhibitions ==
Selected solo shows include:

- L'Art Se Donne En Spectacle, Chateau de Lichtenbert, Alsace, France (2013)
- Ffotogallery, Cardiff (2008)
- De La Warr Pavilion, Bexhill on Sea (2007)
- nichido contemporary art, Tokyo, Japan (2003, 2009)
- Centre pour L’image Contemporain Saint-Gervais, Geneva, Switzerland (2003)
- Alberto Peola, Turin, Italy (2002, 2004)
- Emily Tsingou, London (1999, 2001, 2003, 2005)

Selected group exhibitions include:

- Portrait/Landscape: Genre Boundaries, Moscow Museum of Modern Art, Moscow (2012)
- In Our World. New Photography in Britain, Galleria Civica, Modena, Italy (2008)
- Night, Royal West of England Academy, Bath, UK (2008)
- Les Peintres de la Vie Moderne, Centre Pompidou, Paris, France (2007)
- Fotografierte Landschaften, Museum der bildenden Künste, Leipzig, Germany (2007)
- Order and Chaos, Fotomuseum Winterthur, Winterthur, Switzerland (2003)
- Where are We?, Victoria & Albert Museum, London (2001)

== Publications ==
Monographs

2012	To The River, Sophy Rickett, Arnolfini, Bristol/ Brancolini Grimaldi London ISBN 9780-907738-99-2
2011	Auditorium, ed. John Gill and David Chandler, Photoworks, Brighton ISBN 978-1-903796-23-8
2005	Sophy Rickett, Steidl/Photoworks, with essays by Urs Stahel, Mark Durden and David Chandler, and an interview with the artist. ISBN 3-86521-088-0
2001	Photographs, Emily Tsingou Gallery, London

Anthologies and group exhibition catalogues

2008	New Photography in Britain, ed. Filippo Maggia, Skira, Milan ISBN 9788861305434
2006	Vitamin PH, Phaidon, London ISBN 0-7148-4656-2
	Les Peintres de la Vie Moderne, Editions du Centre Pompidou, Paris ISBN 2-84426-316-X
2003	Order & Chaos, ed. Urs Stahel, Fotomuseum Winterthur/Christoph Merian Verlag
2001	The Fantastic Recurrence of Certain Situations, with an essay by Kate Bush, Communidad de Madrid, Spain
	Nothing, ed. Graham Gussin and Ele Carpenter, August and Northern Gallery for Contemporary Art, UK
1999	Common People: Arte Inglese tra Fenomeno e Realtà, curated by Francesco Bonami, Fondazione Sandretto Re Rebaudenco per l’Arte, Italy
	Jardin de Eros, Institut de Cultura de Barcelona, Spain
1998	New Contemporaries 98, New Contemporaries Ltd, UK
	Remix, Musée des Beaux-Arts de Nantes, France
	On the Bright side of Life, Neue Gesellschaft für Bildende Kunst (NGBK), Berlin, Germany
1997	Public Relations-New British Photography, Cantz, Germany

== Awards and commissions ==
- 2012 – Artist Associate-ship, Institute of Astronomy, University of Cambridge, UK
- 2010 – Recipient of AHRC Practice Led Research Grant
- 2009 – Winner of Icona 09, Verona Art Fair, Verona, Italy
- 2008 – Recipient of Development Grant, Film and Video Umbrella, UK
- 2003 – Recipient of Mont Blanc Cutting Edge Award to Artists
- 2002 – Fellowship at St John's College, Oxford
- 2002 – Arts Council of England, Helen Chadwick Fellowship, hosted by The British School at Rome / Ruskin School, Oxford
- 2000 – Fellowship at DCA, Dundee Contemporary Arts, Dundee, UK
- 1999 – BMW Financial Services Millennium Commission in collaboration with the Victoria and Albert Museum, London, UK

== Public collections ==
Sophy Rickett's work is included in the following public collections.

- Centre Georges Pompidou, Paris, France
- Government Art Collection, UK
- Musée des Beaux-Arts de Nantes, Nantes, France
- Museum der bildenden Künste, Leipzig, Germany
- Victoria and Albert Museum, London, UK
