= Andrew Martin (novelist) =

British writer (born 1962)

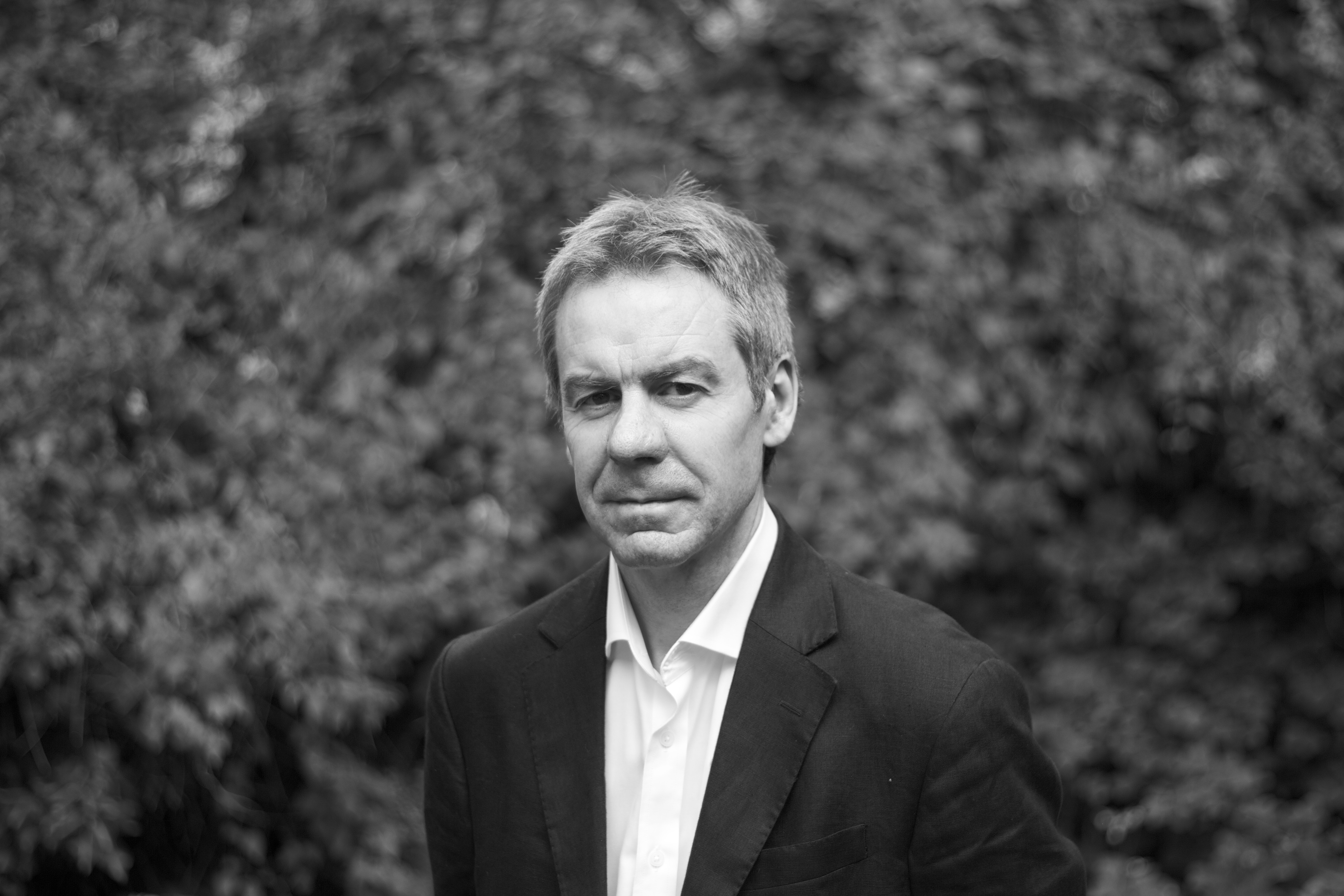
- Born: 6 July 1962 (age 64); York, Yorkshire, England
- Occupation: Novelist
- Writing career
- Genre: Crime Fiction
- Notable work: Jim Stringer, Steam Detective
- Website: martinesque.co.uk

Andrew Martin (born 6 July 1962) is an English journalist, rail historian, crime novelist, and writer of fiction and non-fiction. He is the author of more than 30 books, many about railways. He is also a broadcaster, and writes a Substack, Reading on Trains.

Martin was brought up in Yorkshire, studied at Merton College, Oxford, and qualified as a barrister. He began working as a journalist, and his first novel, Bilton, a satire on journalism, appeared in 1999. It was followed in 2001 by 'The Bobby Dazzlers', about a gang of burglars in York.The Guardian said that Bilton and The Bobby Dazzlers "rank high in the lists of the best comic novels published in the past 10 years".

His series of detective novels about Jim Stringer, a railwayman reassigned to the North Eastern Railway police in Edwardian England, includes The Necropolis Railway (set on the London Necropolis Railway), The Blackpool Highflyer, The Lost Luggage Porter, Murder at Deviation Junction, Death on a Branch Line, The Last Train to Scarborough, The Somme Stations (Winner of the Crime Writers' Association Ellis Peters Historical Award 2011), The Baghdad Railway Club., Night Train to Jamalpur and Powder Smoke.

His other crime fiction includes The Yellow Diamond, A Crime of the Super-Rich (2015), a detective novel set in London's Mayfair; 'Soot' (2017), set in 18th century York; and The Winker (2019), about a failed pop star who winks at people, then kills them. As A.J. Martin, he wrote The Night in Venice, about a schoolgirl unsure whether she has killed her guardian or merely dreamt it. His novel The Moquette Mystery, set in interwar London, was published in 2025.

He has written non-fiction. Railway-related titles include Underground Overground, A Passenger's History of the Tube; Belles and Whistles, Five Journeys Through Time on Britain's Trains and Night Trains, The Rise and Fall of the Sleeper.

Other non-fiction works include How to Get Things Really Flat; Ghoul Britannia and Flight by Elephant about Gyles Mackrell and his Burmese, elephant-assisted wartime rescue mission, published in 2013.

He is the editor of a dictionary of humorous quotations: Funny You Should Say That: A Compendium of Jokes, Quips and Quotations from Cicero to the Simpsons.

His works for television and radio include: Between the Lines, Railways in Fiction and Film (2008), Disappearing Dad, Fathers in Literature (2010), The Trains that Time Forgot: Britain's Lost Railway Journeys (2015), all in the Timeshift series, and three essay series for Radio 3, The Sound and The Fury (2013), England Ejects (2014), The Further Realm (2015).

Martin writes and performs music under the name Brunswick Green.

Martin lives in north London with his wife and sons.

== Bibliography ==
- Bilton. Faber & Faber. 1999. ISBN 0-571-19565-2.
- The Bobby Dazzlers. Faber & Faber. 2002. ISBN 0-571-21229-8.
- The Yellow Diamond, Faber & Faber, 2015. ISBN 978-0-571-28820-5
- Soot, Corsair, 2017. (ISBN 978-1472152435)
- The Martian Girl, Corsair, 2018. (ISBN 978-1472152466)
- The Winker, Corsair, 2019. (ISBN 9781472153975)

Jim Stringer, Steam Detective, novels

- The Necropolis Railway. Faber & Faber. 2002. ISBN 0-571-20991-2.
- The Blackpool Highflyer. Faber & Faber. 2005. ISBN 0-571-21902-0.
- The Lost Luggage Porter. Faber & Faber. 2007. ISBN 0-571-21904-7.
- Murder at Deviation Junction. Faber & Faber. 2008. ISBN 0-571-22966-2.
- Death on a Branch Line. Faber & Faber. 2008. ISBN 0-571-22967-0.
- The Last Train to Scarborough. Faber & Faber. 2009. ISBN 0-571-22969-7.
- The Somme Stations. Faber & Faber. 2011. ISBN 0-5712-4964-7.
- The Baghdad Railway Club. Faber & Faber. 2012. ISBN 0-5712-4961-2.
- Night Train to Jamalpur. Faber & Faber. 2014. ISBN 0-5712-8410-8.
- Powder Smoke (Jim Stringer Book 10), Corsair, 2021. ISBN 1472154835
- The Night in Venice (as A.J. Martin), Weidenfeld & Nicolson, 2024. ISBN 9781399608022

Non-fiction

- How to Get Things Really Flat: A Man's Guide to Ironing, Dusting and Other Household Arts. Short Books. 2008. ISBN 1-906021-46-5
- Funny You Should Say That: A Compendium of Jokes, Quips and Quotations from Cicero to the Simpsons. Penguin 2006. ISBN 978-0140515091.
- Ghoul Britannia, Notes on a Haunted Island. Short Books. 2009. ISBN 1-906021-85-6
- Underground, Overground: A Passenger's History of the Tube. Profile Books. 2012. ISBN 1-846684-77-3
- Flight by Elephant, World War II's most Daring Jungle Mission. Fourth Estate. 2013. ISBN 0007461526
- Belles & Whistles, Five Journeys Through Time on Britain's Trains. Profile Books, 2014. ISBN 9781 78125 212 3.
- Night Trains, The Rise and Fall of the Sleeper, Profile Books, 2017. ISBN 9781781255599
- Seats of London: A Field Guide to London Transport Moquette Patterns, Safe Haven Books, 2019. ISBN 9781916045316
- Steam Trains Today: Journeys Along Britain's Heritage Railways, Profile Books, 2021. ISBN 1788161440
- Métropolitain: An Ode to the Paris Métro, Little, Brown, 2023
- To The Sea by Train, Profile Books, July 2025. ISBN 9781805221555
