= Imogen Robertson =

British director, poet and novelist

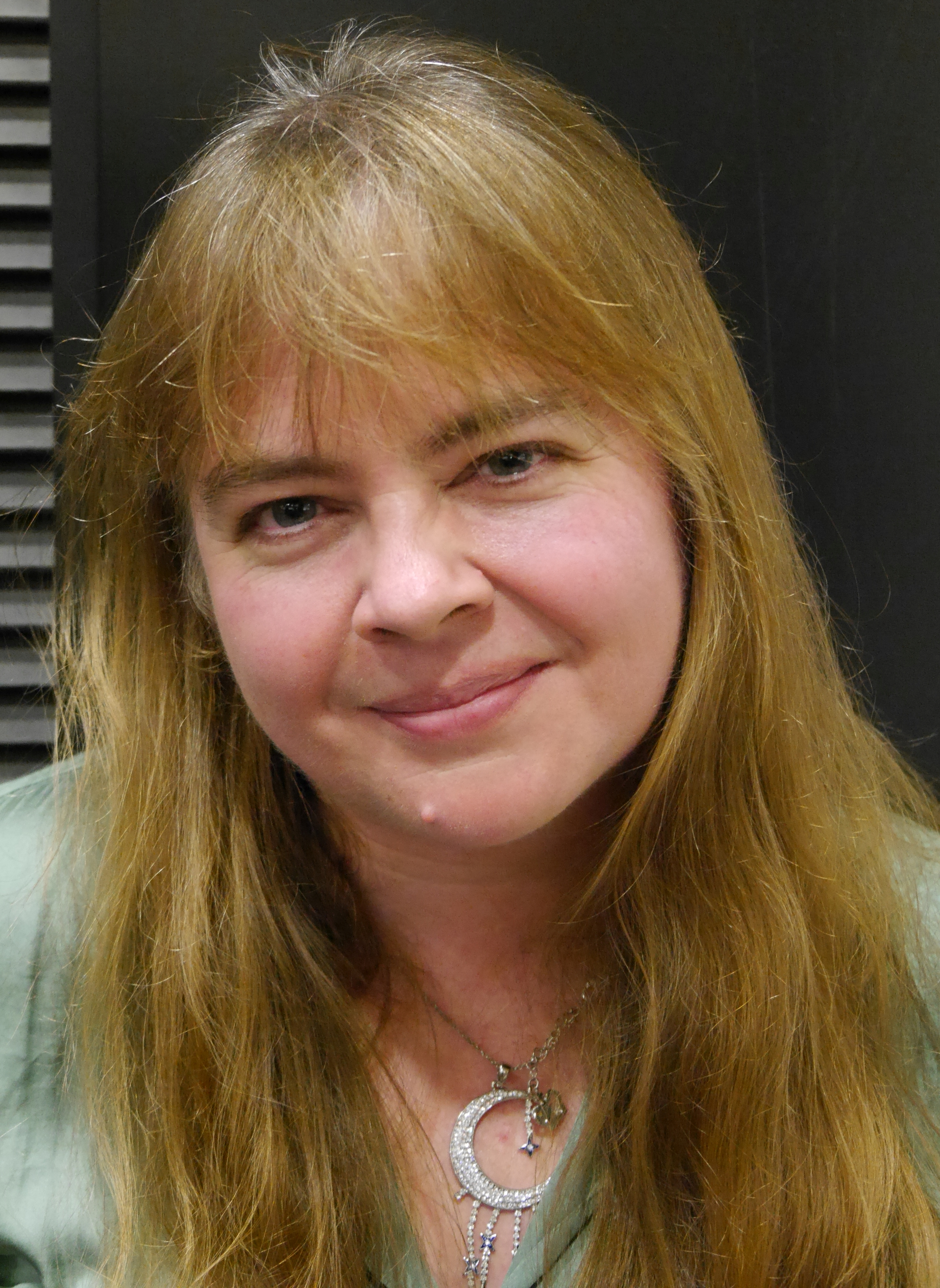
Robertson in 2019

Imogen Robertson is a British director in different media, a poet and novelist.

== Biography ==
She was born and grew up in Darlington, England, attending a local comprehensive and a boys' public school in the sixth form. She studied Russian and German at the University of Cambridge.

Her directorial work includes documentaries, TV films, children's television (e.g. Numberjacks for the BBC), radio and museum voiceovers.

She is best-known for her writing. She received a commendation in the National Poetry Competition in 2005. In 2007, she won The Daily Telegraph's 'First thousand words of a novel competition', and this became the opening of her debut work, Instruments of Darkness. Most of her novels are set in the late 18th century and feature the tenacious detective pairing of Mrs. Harriet Westerman, a dynamic Sussex landowner, and her neighbour Gabriel Crowther, an anatomist of quiet renown hiding a baronial past. Robertson has been a candidate for the CWA Historical Dagger three times, for Circle of Shadows, Island of Bones and Theft of Life. She has co-written three novels: she wrote King of Kings with Wilbur Smith; she collaborated with US screenwriter Darby Kealey (a writer for Patriot) under the pseudonym 'Imogen Kealey' for Liberation, a World War II thriller about French resistance and SOE operative Nancy Wake, which is currently in movie production with Anne Hathaway as the lead character; she wrote another thriller, The House, with former deputy leader of the Labour Party, Tom Watson.

She lives in London with her husband.

== Published works ==
- Instruments of Darkness (2009)
- Anatomy of Murder (2010)
- Island of Bones (2011)
- Circle of Shadows (2012)
- The Paris Winter (2013)
- Theft of Life (2014)
- King of Kings [with Wilbur Smith] (2019)
- Liberation [with Darby Kealey as 'Imogen Kealey'] (2020)
- The House [with Tom Watson] (2020)
