= Donna Moore =

Donna Moore may refer to:

- Donna Moore (horse trainer) (1931–2014), American Saddlebred horse trainer
- Donna Moore (novelist) (born 1962), Scottish novelist
- Donna Moore (strongwoman), British strongwoman
