= Gyles Mackrell =

British tea planter (1888–1959)

Gyles Mackrell DFC GM (9 October 1888 – 20 February 1959) was a British tea planter known for organising a rescue of refugees retreating from the advancing Japanese across the Burma-India border during World War II.

Mackrell was a shikari in Shillong, Assam with his own elephant transport business and also acted as an agent for the tea agents Octavius Steel & Co. On 4 June 1942, some refugees managed to cross the Dapha River, which had been swollen by monsoon rains, by forming a human chain and told Mackrell about the great difficulty others were experiencing trying to cross the Chaukan Pass (Note: The Chaukan Pass (27.163889°N 97.172222°E) lies between the Indian Lohit District of Arunachal Pradesh and the Burmese Kachin State.) at the Burma-India border. When the monsoon winds and river calmed he decided to use his elephants to help. "These elephants are quite capable of such a daunting task," he said and by September had rescued about 200 people, mainly British and Indian soldiers, feeding and caring for them until help arrived, despite falling severely ill with fever himself for some time.

For his services, Mackrell was awarded the George Medal (GM) in January 1943.

In World War I, Mackrell served in the Royal Flying Corps (later Royal Air Force) in India, reaching the rank of Captain. He was awarded the Distinguished Flying Cross (DFC) in 1919.

Mackrell died in Suffolk in 1959.

In 2013, British author Andrew Martin published a full-length book about Mackrell and the elephant rescue entitled Flight By Elephant: The Untold Story of World War Two's Most Daring Jungle Rescue.

== See also ==
- Japanese occupation of Burma
