= Valley View Supreme =

American Saddlebred horse

- Valley View Supreme with Tom Moore
- Breed: American Saddlebred
- Discipline: Saddle Seat
- Sire: Genius Bourbon King
- Grandsire: Bourbon King
- Dam: Diana Gay
- Maternal grandsire: The Genius
- Sex: Stallion
- Foaled: April 23, 1952
- Country: USA
- Color: Chestnut
- Breeder: W.P. Rogovsky
- Trainer: Tom Moore

Valley View Supreme (April 23, 1952- November 28, 1967) was a chestnut American Saddlebred by Genius Bourbon King, out of Diana Gay. He has proven in both America, and South Africa, that he is the greatest son of Genius Bourbon King.

== Life and career ==
Valley View Supreme was born in April 1952. He was by Genius Bourbon King, out of Diana Gay. About a year before he was born, his owner, W.P. Rogovsky fell ill. Another horse owner, Everette Ledbetter, wanted to buy some of his horse trailers, but Rogovsky wouldn't give unless Ledbetter bought a few of his horses too. Ledbetter later bought two colts, one that would later be named, Valley View Supreme.

After the future Valley View Supreme was bought, Ledbetter found that he had no room for him or the other colt. He sought to his friend Tom Moore to buy them from him. Moore bought both, even though Valley View Supreme was petite and out of shape. Moore kept Valley View Supreme for a bit, and fed him until he looked better. He was then sold to Ray Schafer for Valley View Farm.

Valley View Supreme started his training in 1954. He was first showed in Springfield, Illinois, at the Midwest Horse Show, becoming a Two-Year-Old Fine Harness Champion. After, he showed at the Junior Stakes in Wisconsin, and American Royal in Indiana. He became the Junior Fine Harness Champion, soon after though, Valley View's status became worse. He won third at the Ohio State Fair, and fourth at Louisville. Tom Moore tried to gait Valley View, but it didn't work out.

In hope to win more shows, Valley View Supreme was shipped to Harrisburg, Pennsylvania. He was in the Royal Winter Fair in Toronto. Carl Webster was to be his trainer, after his win at the fair. Valley View's last show was at Louisville.

Valley View Supreme's life got the "Ruxer twist" when he was sold to Alvin Ruxer for $25,000. He was moved to Ruxer Farms in Jasper, Indiana, the next year. In four years, Valley View made history in the Saddlebred breeding industry.

Valley View Supreme died on November 28, 1967, because of a heart attack. On his grave, are the following words:

Under this sod lies a great one;
The King of show horses, the Star of the show,
To sire tomorrow's champions was his role,
If there's a horse Heaven, please God, rest his soul.

Sire line descent tree
- Valley View Supreme
  - Hide-A-Ways Firefly Supreme
    - Fire Up
  - Longview Supreme
    - Longviews Regent
      - Call Me Jack
  - Supreme Sultan
    - Freedom Hall
    - Sultans Santana
      - Santanas Charm
        - Sir William Robert
      - Shamrock Santana
        - Boucheron
    - Supreme O'Lee
    - Champagne Fizz
      - Heir To Champagne
    - Worthy Son
    - Imperator
    - Sultans Americana
    - Radiant Sultan
      - Foxfires Prophet
      - Radiant Success
    - Sultans Royalty
    - Supreme Heir
      - One For The Road
      - Stonecroft Ring Leader
      - The Edge
      - Heir Popper
      - Callaway's Copyright
      - Callaway's Sunday Edit
      - Mountainviews Heir To Fortune
      - Who Wants To Be A Millionheir
    - Sultan's Great Day
      - Call Me Ringo
      - Callaways Regatta
      - Devoted To The Cause
      - My Special Sultan
      - Winter Day
      - The Daily Lottery
    - Sultans Starmaker
    - Sultans Collectors Item
      - Callaways Merry-Go-Round
    - The Irish Connection
  - Supreme Spirit
    - Supreme Fortune
  - Status Symbol
    - Night Prowler
      - First Night Out
        - Im First
