= Aly Monroe =

British writer of historical thrillers

- Born: Leicester
- Occupation: Novelist
- Writing career
- Genre: Thriller
- Website: alymonroe.com

Aly Monroe is a British writer of historical thrillers set in the 1940s. She was brought up in Purley, England. She has spent a large part of her life in Spain, where she worked as a teacher, translator and voice-over artist. She is the author of the Peter Cotton series of historical novels, including Icelight which won the 2012 Ellis Peters Historical Award.

== Bibliography ==
Monroe's series character is Peter Cotton who works for the British intelligence service. Her first novel, The Maze of Cadiz, is set in Spain, where Monroe lived for many years. The second novel, Washington Shadow, was set in Washington, DC and shortlisted for the CWA Ellis Peters Historical Fiction Award. The third novel of the series, Icelight, won the CWA Ellis Peters Historical Award.

== Novels ==
- The Maze of Cadiz (2008)
- Washington Shadow (2009)
- Icelight (2011)
- Black Bear (2013)
