= Supreme Sultan =

- Well known image of Supreme Sultan
- Breed: American Saddlebred
- Discipline: Harness
- Sire: Valley View Supreme
- Grandsire: Genius Bourbon King
- Dam: Melody Olee
- Maternal grandsire: Anacacho Denmark
- Sex: Stallion
- Foaled: March 12, 1966
- Country: United States
- Color: Red Chestnut
- Breeder: Alvin Ruxer
- Owner: Bob Ruxer
- Trainer: Lee Shipman

Awards
- Reserve World Champion

Supreme Sultan (March 12, 1966 – December 6, 1983) was an American Saddlebred stallion. He was a chestnut, and was sired by Valley View Supreme, out of Melody Olee. Sultan was sold to Barlite Farms as a yearling, was shown as a 2-year-old, but then repurchased and returned to Ruxer Farms. During his lifetime, he sired multiple champion offspring in nearly every division of American Saddlebred horse show competition and set leading sire records. Noted for his refinement and action, his impact as a sire modernized the Saddlebred breed in both the United States and South Africa. As a result of his influence on the breed, at his death he was buried at Kentucky Horse Park and a bronze statue of him stands atop his grave.

== Life and career ==
Supreme Sultan was foaled on March 12, 1966. He was a red chestnut, sired by Valley View Supreme, out of Melody Olee.

As a yearling in 1968 at the Kentucky State Fair, Supreme Sultan was sold to Barlite Farm in San Antonio, Texas. Supreme Sultan was bought to replace his sire, Valley View Supreme, a breeding stallion, who died in 1967 from a heart attack. Later though, he was repurchased and returned to Ruxer Farms. At the age of 11, Sultan topped the futurity sire ratings of Saddle and Bridle magazine, the youngest horse to accomplish this feat. Bill Caldwell, Sultan's breeding manager commented on him, "He was like a human – he had more guts and courage than any horse I've ever seen. He was the show horse the minute he was born."

Supreme Sultan started his show ring career as a two-year-old. Tom Moore showed two-year-old Sultan in fine harness, winning the Illinois and Indiana Futurities. He also won the two-year-old stakes at the Chicago International, and the American Royal. He was noted for being more refined in appearance than other Saddlebreds of his time, and also admired for his very high and elegant action, particularly in his hindquarters. His influence as a sire changed the look of the American Saddlebred breed, and he is considered the horse who changed the look of the breed to the phenotype seen today.

Supreme Sultan was euthanized, on December 6, 1983, at the age of 17 due to colic. He was buried at the Kentucky Horse Park in Lexington, Kentucky. A year before his death, a 1/5 scale bronze statue of Sultan was made by Patrica Crane, and upon his death, she recreated the sculpture at full-size to immortalize him. The life size statue now stands upon his grave.

== Offspring ==
Supreme Sultan sired Saddlebreds who became World Champions in virtually all show divisions. Society Diana was the first mare bred to Supreme Sultan. Out of her, Sultan had his first foal, Freedom Hall. Notable offspring include Imperator, Sultan's Great Day, Sultan's Starina, Sultan's Heir, Sultan's Santana, and Sultan's Royalty. Sultan's Santana was notable in his own right as the first American Saddlebred to sell for over $1 million. Some of Supreme Sultan's offspring were exported to South Africa, including his son Supreme O' Lee. He is considered the horse that created the modern style of American Saddlebred in both the United States and South Africa.

Sire line descent tree
- Supreme Sultan
  - Freedom Hall
  - Sultans Santana
    - Santanas Charm
      - Sir William Robert
    - Shamrock Santana
      - Boucheron
  - Supreme O'Lee
  - Champagne Fizz
    - Heir To Champagne
  - Worthy Son
  - Imperator
  - Sultans Americana
  - Radiant Sultan
    - Foxfires Prophet
    - Radiant Success
  - Sultans Royalty
  - Supreme Heir
    - One For The Road
    - Stonecroft Ring Leader
    - The Edge
    - Heir Popper
    - Callaway's Copyright
    - Callaway's Sunday Edit
    - Mountainviews Heir To Fortune
    - Who Wants To Be A Millionheir
  - Sultan's Great Day
    - Call Me Ringo
    - Callaways Regatta
    - Devoted To The Cause
    - My Special Sultan
    - Winter Day
  - Sultans Starmaker
  - Sultans Collectors Item
    - Callaways Merry-Go-Round
  - The Irish Connection

== Pedigree ==
Supreme Sultan's sire, Valley View Supreme, was the only stallion ever to become Three Gaited World Grand champion. His dam, Melody Olee, is one of the many listed in the Broodmare Hall of Fame. She foaled 4 ribbon winners that were sold at the Kentucky State Fair.

Pedigree of Supreme Sultan
Sire Valley View Supreme	Genius Bourbon King	Bourbon Genius	Kings Genius*
Sire Valley View Supreme	Genius Bourbon King	Bourbon Genius	Kate Haines*
Sire Valley View Supreme	Genius Bourbon King	Blessed Event	Silver Mac
Sire Valley View Supreme	Genius Bourbon King	Blessed Event	Fair Promise
Sire Valley View Supreme	Diana Gay	The Genius	Kings Genius*
Sire Valley View Supreme	Diana Gay	The Genius	Kate Haines*
Sire Valley View Supreme	Diana Gay	Lady Alice	Kalarama Rex
Sire Valley View Supreme	Diana Gay	Lady Alice	Jean Bohemian
Dam Melody Olee	Anacacho Denmark	Edna Mays King	Bourbon King
Dam Melody Olee	Anacacho Denmark	Edna Mays King	Edna May
Dam Melody Olee	Anacacho Denmark	Jane Black	San Vincente
Dam Melody Olee	Anacacho Denmark	Jane Black	Candy Kid
Dam Melody Olee	Judy Olee	Leatherwood King	Kings Genius*
Dam Melody Olee	Judy Olee	Leatherwood King	Kate Haines*
Dam Melody Olee	Judy Olee	Aces Orchid	American Ace
Dam Melody Olee	Judy Olee	Aces Orchid	Majorie Beebe

* Supreme Sultan is inbred 4S × 4S x 4D to the stallion Kings Genius, meaning that he appears fourth generation twice on the sire side of his pedigree and fourth generation once on the dam side of his pedigree.

* Supreme Sultan is inbred 4S × 4S x 4D to the mare Kate Haines, meaning that she appears fourth generation twice on the sire side of his pedigree and fourth generation once on the dam side of his pedigree.
