= Hairline Cracks =

1990 children's novel by Andrew Taylor

- Author: Andrew Taylor
- Language: English
- Publication date: 1990

Hairline Cracks is a 1990 children's novel by Andrew Taylor.

When Sam and his friend Mo begin to investigate his mother's disappearance, they put themselves in danger as they learn about hairline cracks in the silos of a nuclear plant and the ruthlessness of men who want this kept secret.
