= Rory Clements =

British fiction author

- Born: Dover
- Occupation: Author
- Spouse: Naomi Clements-Wright
- Writing career
- Genre: Historical fiction
- Notable works: Revenger, Nucleus
- Notable awards: CWA Ellis Peters Historical Fiction Award
- Website: www.roryclements.co.uk

Rory Clements is a British author of historical fiction. He is best known for his John Shakespeare books, set in the Elizabethan era, the Tom Wilde second world war spy thriller series, and the Sebastian Wolff crime novels, set in Nazi Germany during the 1930s. Clements has twice won the Crime Writers' Association Historical Dagger.

== Biography ==
Following a career in print media working for titles such as the Daily Mail and the Evening Standard, Clements has been working since 2007 as a full-time author. He has found success with his series of Elizabethan historical thriller novels about the character of John Shakespeare, and also the Tom Wilde series of spy novels focused on the second world war era.

In 2010, Clements' historical mystery novel Revenger won the CWA Ellis Peters Historical Fiction Award. A further three of the John Shakespeare novels, Martyr, Prince, and The Heretics, were nominated for the same award. In 2018, Clements won the CWA Ellis Peters Historical Fiction Award again, this time with the second world war Tom Wilde thriller novel Nucleus.

A TV series of the John Shakespeare novels is under development.

Clements lives in Norfolk, England, and is married to artist Naomi Clements-Wright.

== Works ==
=== John Shakespeare series ===
- Martyr (2009; ISBN 9781848542235)
- Revenger (2010; ISBN 9781848543881)
- Prince (2011; ISBN 9781848544277)
- Traitor (2012; ISBN 9781848544314)
- The Man in the Snow (2012; ISBN 9780062301895) (novella; available as an ebook and included as a bonus story in some printed editions of The Queen's Man)
- The Heretics (2013; ISBN 9781848544352)
- The Queen's Man (2014; ISBN 9781848548466)
- Holy Spy (2015; ISBN 9781848548510)

=== Tom Wilde series ===
- Corpus (2017; ISBN 9781785762635)
- Nucleus (2018; ISBN 9781785763731)
- Nemesis (2019; ISBN 9781785767517)
- Hitler's Secret (2020; ISBN 9781838770310)
- A Prince and a Spy (2021; ISBN 9781838773373)
- The Man in the Bunker (2022; ISBN 9781838777692)
- The English Führer (2023; ISBN 9781804181058)
- A Cold Wind from Moscow (2025; ISBN 9781804185087)

=== Sebastian Wolff series ===
- Munich Wolf (2024; ISBN 9781804181423)
- Evil in High Places (2025; ISBN 978-0241728185)
- Invitation from a Dictator (2026; ISBN 978-0241728215)

== See also ==
- Robert Harris (novelist) – English novelist (born 1957)
- R. N. Morris – English writer and advertising copywriter
- C. J. Sansom – British author of crime fiction (1952–2024)
