= David Young (novelist) =

English novelist

- Born: David John Young; Cottingham, East Riding of Yorkshire
- Occupation: Novelist
- Writing career
- Genres: Mystery, Thriller, Historical

David John Young is an English novelist whose crime thriller series featuring a fictional Volkspolizei detective, Karin Müller, is set in 1970s East Germany. Young's debut novel Stasi Child won the 2016 CWA Endeavour Historical Dagger for the best historical crime novel of the year. Both it and the follow-up, Stasi Wolf, were longlisted for the Theakston's Old Peculier Crime Novel of the Year Award in 2016 and 2017 respectively. In 2017, Bonnier Zaffre, the UK adult fiction division of the Bonnier Group, announced Young had signed a six-figure deal for three further novels in the series, making five in all, with the third, A Darker State, being published in February 2018. Young says the inspiration for the series came after his indie pop band The Candy Twins toured Germany in 2007 and he read Anna Funder's non-fiction book Stasiland between gigs. He secured the tour thanks to favourable comments made by Edwyn Collins about a tribute song Young wrote about him. Before becoming a full-time novelist, Young was a news producer and editor for more than 25 years with BBC World Service radio and BBC World TV.

== Works ==
Stasi Child was chosen as The Times Crime Book of the Month in February 2016 and reviewed by Marcel Berlins who said the novel was 'particularly successful' in 'portraying the mood of East Germans at the time - fear yet pride'. In the same month, it was also a Pick of the Week in The Daily Telegraph, and reviewed in the Sunday Express. In March 2016 it was chosen as WHSmith Fiction Book of the Month. The book's highest chart position was number 17 in The Bookseller UK mass market fiction chart. Stasi Wolf followed in February 2017, again a Daily Telegraph Pick of the Week, then A Darker State in 2018, Stasi 77 in 2019, and the series was completed in 2020 with Stasi Winter and The Stasi Game . The Stasi novels were optioned for television by Euston Films. The series has been sold in eleven territories around the world. In 2022, Young released a stand-alone crime novel set in Hull in World War Two, Death In Blitz City.

== Bibliography ==
=== Novels ===
- Stasi Child (2016) | Book #1
- Stasi Wolf (2017) | Book #2
- A Darker State or Stasi State (2018) | Book #3
- Stasi ‘77 (2019) | Book #4
- Stasi Winter (2020) | Book #5
- The Stasi Game (2020) | Book #6
- Death In Blitz City (2022) | Stand-alone novel

== Awards and nominations ==
Stasi Child won the 2016 CWA Endeavour Historical Dagger and was longlisted for the 2016 Theakston's Old Peculier Crime Novel of the Year Award. A draft of the novel won the City University London 2014 crime fiction prize, sponsored by the Peters, Fraser & Dunlop literary agency who now represent Young. The opening 15,000 words of Stasi Child won third prize in the novel section of the 2014 Yeovil Literary Prize. Stasi Wolf was longlisted for the 2017 Theakston's Old Peculier Crime Novel of the Year Award.
