= Andrew Taylor (author) =

British author (born 1951)

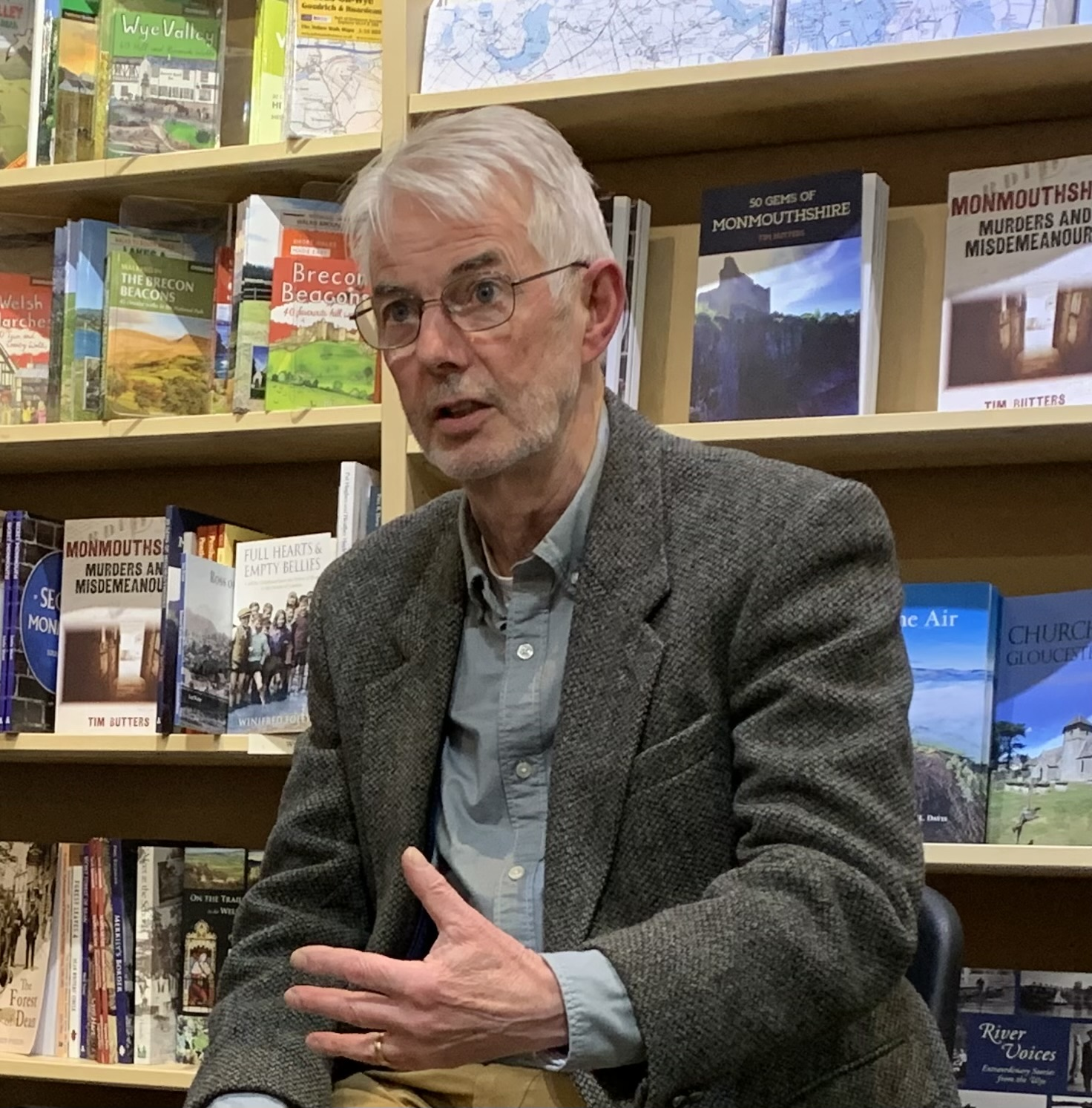

Andrew Taylor (born 14 October 1951) is a British author best known for his crime and historical novels, which include the Lydmouth series, the Roth Trilogy and historical novels such as the number-one best-selling The American Boy and The Ashes of London. His accolades include the Diamond Dagger, Britain's top crime-writing award.

== Biography ==
Andrew Taylor grew up in East Anglia. He read English at Emmanuel College, Cambridge, and has an MA in Library, Archive and Information Science from University College London.

His first novel, Caroline Minuscule (1982), won the John Creasey Memorial Award of the Crime Writers' Association of Great Britain. He is the only author to have won the CWA's Historical Dagger three times, with The Office of the Dead, The American Boy and The Scent of Death. He has also won the Cartier Diamond Dagger, for sustained excellence in crime writing and has been shortlisted for the Gold Dagger, the Theakston's Old Peculier (twice), and the Edgar award. Bleeding Heart Square won Sweden's Martin Beck Award, the Golden Crowbar, in 2009. The King's Evil won the Gold Crown for the best historical novel of the year. He was inducted into The Detection Club in 1995.

The American Boy, a gothic mystery linked to Edgar Allan Poe's boyhood years in England, was one of the ten titles featured in Channel 4's Richard and Judy Book Club 2005 and was also selected for The Times Top Ten Crime Novels of the Decade.

The Roth Trilogy (now also available in an omnibus edition as Requiem for an Angel) was shown on ITV in March 2007. It was a three-part drama series under the title of Fallen Angel, starring Charles Dance and Emilia Fox. The series was broadcast on three consecutive nights, beginning 11 March 2007.

His most recent books are historical novels as well as crime fiction. They explore different historical eras: Bleeding Heart Square, is set in the 1930s mainly in London (2008); The Anatomy of Ghosts (2010), set in eighteenth-century Cambridge; The Scent of Death, set in British New York, 1778–80; and its sequel, The Silent Boy (2014), during the French Revolution.

The Ashes of London (2016) is set during and just after the Great Fire of 1666. It is the first of a series set in Restoration England. The paperback edition was made Waterstone's thriller of the month for two consecutive months through January and February 2017 and was the number one bestseller for eight weeks in The Times/Waterstones chart. In 2018 he published a sequel- The Fire Court, and the third of the series, The King's Evil, was released in March 2019. The series continued with The Last Protector (2020), The Royal Secret (2021) and The Shadows of London (2023).

Andrew Taylor has also written a number of novellas with ghostly or other-worldly themes, originally as Kindle Singles. Three have been collected under the title Fireside Gothic (2016).

He has reviewed in many publications, in particular the Spectator (whose crime fiction reviewer he was for ten years) and The Times. He has also written short stories and articles on crime fiction. He has contributed the Grub Street column to The Author, the journal of the Society of Authors 2003-21. He edited The Author 2004-06. He has also taught fiction courses for the Arvon Foundation and elsewhere.

He is married with two children. He and his family have lived for many years in Coleford in the Forest of Dean on the borders of England and Wales.

== Bibliography ==
=== Dougal series ===
- Caroline Minuscule (1982)
- Waiting for the End of the World (1984)
- Our Fathers' Lies (1985)
- An Old School Tie (1986)
- Freelance Death (1987)
- Blood Relation (1990)
- The Sleeping Policeman (1992)
- Odd Man Out (1993)

=== Sergeant Jim Bergerac series (written as Andrew Saville) ===
- Bergerac: Crimes of the Season (1985) (in hardback published as Bergerac is Back)
- Bergerac and the Fatal Weakness (1988)
- Bergerac and the Traitor's Child (1988)
- Bergerac and the Jersey Rose (1988)
- Bergerac and the Moving Fever (1988)

=== Blaines novels ===
- The Second Midnight (1987 – reissued 2019)
- Blacklist (1988)
- Toyshop (1990)

=== Lydmouth series (Richard Thornhill & Jill Francis) ===
- An Air That Kills (1994)
- The Mortal Sickness (1995)
- The Lover of the Grave (1997)
- The Suffocating Night (1998)
- Where Roses Fade (2000)
- Death's Own Door (2001)
- Call The Dying (2004)
- Naked to the Hangman (2006)

=== Roth trilogy ===
- Requiem for an Angel (2002) (Omnibus edition) (reissued as Fallen Angel in 2007)
  - The Four Last Things (1997)
  - The Judgment of Strangers (1998)
  - The Office of the Dead (2000)

=== Children's novels ===
- Hairline Cracks (1988)
- Private Nose (1989)
- Snapshot (1989)
- Double Exposure (1990)
- Negative Image (1992)
- The Invader (1994)

=== Psychological thrillers ===
- The Raven on the Water (1991)
- The Barred Window (1993)
- A Stain on the Silence (2006)
- A Schooling in Murder (2025)

=== Historical novels ===
- The American Boy (2003) (US title: An Unpardonable Crime)
- Bleeding Heart Square (2008)
- The Anatomy of Ghosts (2010)
- The Scent of Death (2013)
- The Silent Boy (2014)

=== Marwood and Lovett series ===
- The Ashes of London (2016)
- The Fire Court (2018)
- The King's Evil (2019)
- The Last Protector (2020)
- The Royal Secret (2021)
- The Shadows of London (2023)

=== Short stories ===
- Nibble-Nibble
- The Cost of Living (Dougal)
- The Woman Who Loved Elizabeth David (Lydmouth)
- Waiting For Mr Right
- Fingers to the Bone
- Keeping My Head
- Catch-13
- Little Russia (Lydmouth)
- The Long Sonata of the Dead (Roth)
- The False Inspector Lovesey (Lydmouth)
- The Five-Letter Word (Lydmouth)
- Wrong Notes (Lydmouth)

=== Other ===
- Fireside Gothic (2016)

=== Journalism ===
- "Recent crime fiction". The Spectator. 311 (9446): 36–37. 12 September 2009. Archived from the original on 22 September 2009.

=== Essays ===
- "Story Behind The Scent of Death". Upcoming4.me. 18 October 2013. Archived from the original on 20 October 2013.
- "The story behind The Silent Boy". Upcoming4.me. 4 September 2014. Archived from the original on 6 September 2014.

== Sources ==
- Toronto Public Library – Fallen Angel: The Roth Trilogy
- www.andrew-taylor.co.uk/ – author's official website
