= Harini Nagendra =

Indian ecologist

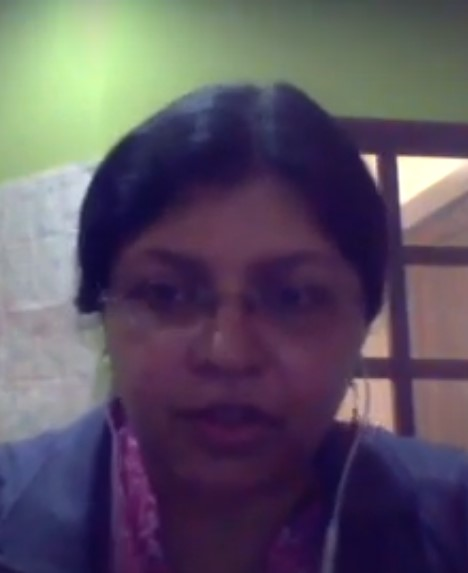
- Harini Nagendra (2019)
- Born: 1972 (age 53–54); Salem, Tamil Nadu, India
- Citizenship: India
- Education: Indian Institute of Science
- Known for: Book: Nature in the City: Bengaluru in the Past, Present, and Future, 2016, Oxford University Press. She is also noted for her work on sustainability studies, remote sensing studies, also for her work as an ecologist and environmentalist.
- Awards: Clarivate-Thomson Reuters Web of Science 2017 India Research Excellence Citation Award, 2013 Elinor Ostrom Senior Scholar Award for Collective Governance of the Commons
- Scientific career
- Fields: Ecology
- Workplaces: Azim Premji University
- Website: https://harininagendra.com

Harini Nagendra is an Indian ecologist who uses satellite remote sensing coupled with field studies of biodiversity, archival research, institutional analysis, and community interviews to examine the factors shaping the social-ecological sustainability of forests and cities in the south Asian context. Her areas of interest include Urban sustainability, Ecology and development, Land change, Biodiversity and conservation.

== Early and personal life ==
Nagendra was born in 1972 in Salem, Tamil Nadu, India.

Born to a botanist mother, Nagendra was inspired by her to pursue a career in the field of science. Nagendra is married and has a daughter.

== Education ==
Nagendra finished her B.Sc. from Bangalore University in 1992. In 1995, she did her M.S. in biological sciences from the Indian Institute of Science.

Nagendra finished her PhD in December 1997 from the Indian Institute of Science in Ecological Sciences.

== Career ==
Nagendra is currently a professor of sustainability at the Azim Premji University, Bangalore. She coordinates the Centre for Urban Sustainability in India at Azim Premji University. Larger global crisis of sustainability motivates Nagendra to research on the subject.

She was a visiting researcher at the University of California, San Diego in 1998. She was an independent researcher from 2003 to 2013. She has worked in a variety of contexts in forests and cities of South Asia and globally. Nagendra served as Hubert H Humphrey Distinguished Visiting Professor at Macalester College, Saint Paul, Minnesota in 2013.

She has over 150 scientific publications to her name, writes widely on her research through Indian newspapers and other forums. She also engages with international research, including being on the Steering Committee of the Programme for Ecosystem Change and Society and a Lead Author on the 5th IPCC Report – Working Group III. She serves on the Executive Committee of the Tyler Prize for Environmental Achievement.

Nagendra's recent book “Nature in the City: Bengaluru in the Past, Present, and Future” (Oxford University Press India, 2016) examines the transformation of human-nature interactions in Bangalore from the 6th century CE to the present, addressing the implications of such change for the urban sustainability of fast-growing cities in the global South.

In 2022, Nagendra's debut mystery novel, The Bangalore Detectives Club, was published in the U.S., U.K. and India.

== Bibliography ==
=== Non-fiction ===
- Nature in the City: Bengaluru in the Past, Present, and Future. Oxford University Press India, 2016.
- Cities and Canopies: Trees in Indian Cities (with Seema Mundoli). Penguin Books India, 2019.
- So Many Leaves (with Seema Mundoli). Penguin Books India, 2022.
- Shades of Blue: Connecting the Drops in India's Cities (with Seema Mundoli). HarperCollins India, 2023.

=== Fiction — The Bangalore Detectives Club series ===
- The Bangalore Detectives Club. 2022. ISBN 1408715171
- Murder Under a Red Moon. 2023. ISBN 1639363734
- A Nest of Vipers. 2024. ISBN 1639366156
- Into the Leopard's Den. 2025. ISBN 9781639368976

== Awards ==
In 2006, Nagendra received the Cozzarelli Prize from the Proceedings of the National Academy of Sciences USA.

She is a recipient of a 2013 Elinor Ostrom Senior Scholar award for her research and practice on issues of the urban commons.

In 2017, Nagendra received Clarivate award for interdisciplinary research in India.
