= Mark Mills (writer) =

British writer of screenplays and novels

- Born: 1963 (age 62–63)
- Occupations: Novelist, screenplay writer
- Children: 2
- Writing career
- Period: 1993 – present
- Notable awards: Crime Writers' Association Award – Best Crime Novel by a Debut Author; 2004 Amagansett Angers European First Film Festival – Best Screenplay; 1995 One Night Stand

Mark Mills (born 1963) is a British writer of screenplays and novels. His first screenplay was the BAFTA-nominated short film One Night Stand starring Jemma Redgrave and James Purefoy in 1993; this won Mills a Best Screenplay' award at the Angers European First Film Festival in 1995.

Mills's first novel was Amagansett, later reissued under the title The Whaleboat House and published in 2004. This won him the award for Best Crime Novel by a Debut Author at the Crime Writers' Association Award. His second novel, The Savage Garden, was published in 2006. His third novel, The Information Officer, was published in April 2009.

== Work ==
Year	Work	Format	Award
1993	One Night Stand	Short film	Angers European First Film Festival – Best Screenplay (Won)
1999	The Lost Son	Film	
2002	Global Heresy	Film	
2004	The Reckoning	Film	
2004	Amagansett (reissued as The Whaleboat House)	Novel	Crime Writers' Association Award – Best Crime Novel by a Debut Author (Won)
2006	The Savage Garden	Novel	
2009	The Information Officer	Novel	
2011	House of the Hanged (Also published as The House of the Hunted)	Novel	
2012	The Long Shadow	Novel	
2014	Waiting For Doggo	Novel	
2016	Where Dead Men Meet	Novel	
2022	Impact	Novel	
