= The City of Strangers =

Novel by Michael Russell

First edition (publ. HarperCollins)

The City of Strangers is the second novel by Irish/English writer Michael Russell in The City series of crime novels set in Dublin, Ireland and Danzig, Germany in the 1930s. It was published in 2013 by Avon. It was nominated for the Crime Writers' Association Endeavour Historical Dagger Award for best historical crime fiction of 2014.
