= Donna Moore (horse trainer) =

- Born: January 28, 1931; Kansas City, Missouri
- Died: January 18, 2014 (aged 82)
- Occupation: American Saddlebred trainer
- Spouse: Tom Moore
- Children: Melinda and Melissa Moore

Donna Moore (1931-2014) was an American Saddlebred horse trainer. She trained horses for William Shatner at his Belle Reve Farm, and owned her own stables near Versailles, Kentucky.

== Life ==
Moore was born January 28, 1931, to Ray and Iva Hobbs, and grew up near Kansas City, Missouri. She married fellow horse trainer Tom Moore, of Illinois, in 1961. The couple had two daughters, Melinda and Melissa. She died January 18, 2014, at the age of 82.

== Career ==
Moore started out in the horse world by getting involved in rodeo and trick riding at a young age. She bought cheap ponies at the local auction, rode them for a week and then resold them at the same auction for a profit. At age 13 she was riding in a rodeo practice when she saw an American Saddlebred and was attracted to it. She was mentored by fellow Missourian Jane Fahey and began training professionally at 19 years of age. She and her husband moved to Kentucky from Illinois in 1970. She trained horses for actor William Shatner at his Belle Reve Farm, among them the stallion Sultan's Great Day. In addition to training for Shatner, Moore had her own stables at Versailles, Kentucky. While her main focus was on American Saddlebreds, she trained Thoroughbreds as well. Besides training horses, Moore exhibited them, judged shows and bought and sold horses and farms. She trained many champions and competed in the National Horse Show and the World's Championship Horse Show. In 1988, she became the first woman to judge the latter event. The same year she was referred to as "the most successful woman in the Saddlebred industry." She once said in an interview for The New York Times, "I can't stand not to be near a horse show. I went to Hawaii once on vacation and I darn near went crazy."
