= Stephanie Merritt =

English literary critic and writer (born 1974)

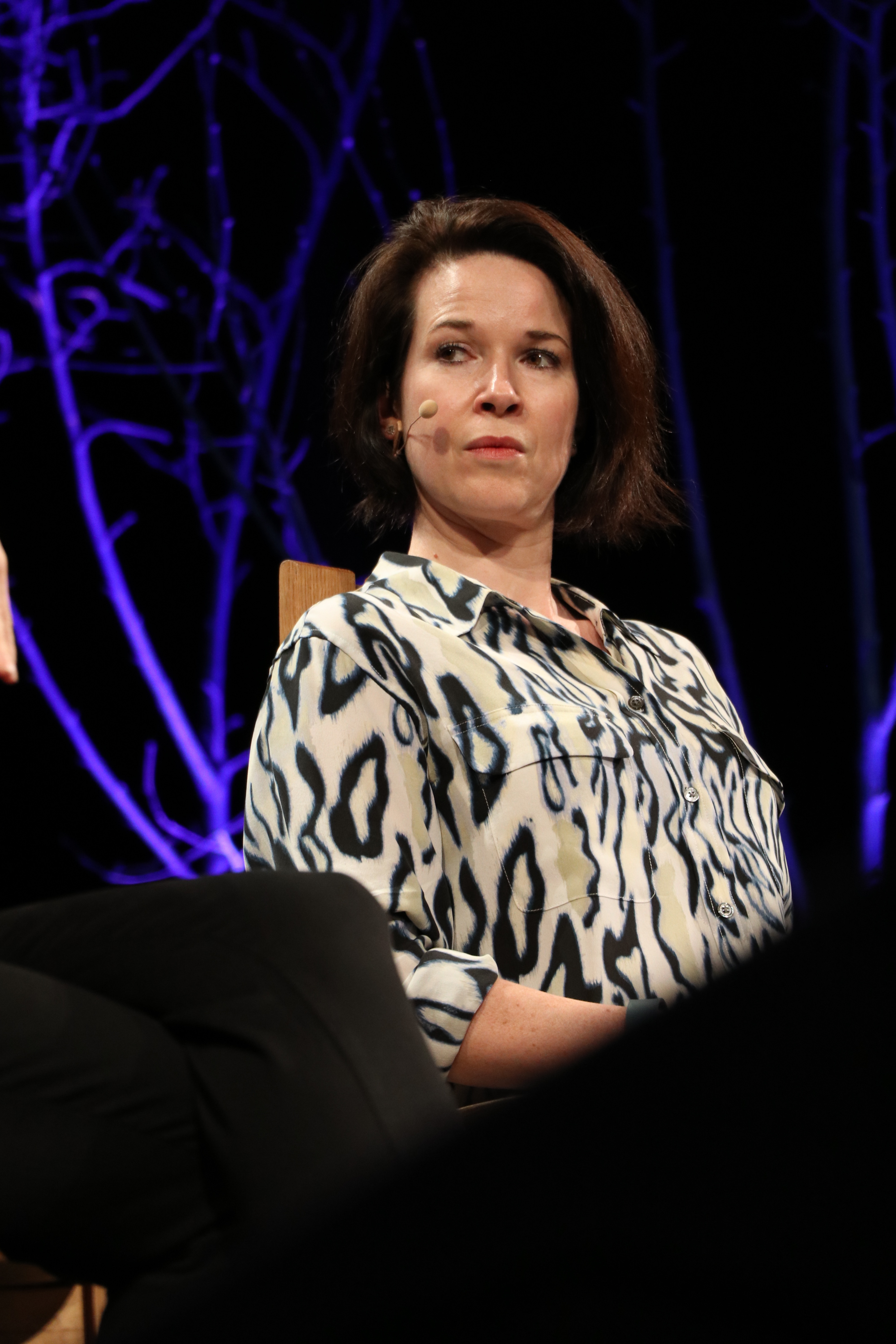
Merritt in 2016

Stephanie Jane Merritt (born 1974 in Surrey) is an English literary critic and writer who has contributed to publications including The Times, The Daily Telegraph, the New Statesman, New Humanist and Die Welt. She was Deputy Literary Editor of The Observer from 1998 to 2005 and currently writes for The Observer and The Guardian, in addition to writing novels — under her own name as well as the pseudonym S. J. Parris.

Merritt read English at Queens' College, Cambridge, and graduated from Cambridge University in 1996. She represented Queens' College on the 2024–2025 season of Christmas University Challenge. The team from Queens' College finished runners-up.

Merritt's first novel Gaveston (Faber & Faber) won a Betty Trask Award from the Society of Authors in 2002. Her second novel was Real (2005), about a struggling young playwright, for which she was also commissioned to write the screenplay. In 2010, Heresy was published, her first novel in the series of historical fiction thrillers featuring Giordano Bruno. It was followed by Prophecy (2011) Sacrilege (2012), Treachery (2014), Conspiracy (2016), Execution (2020) and Alchemy (2023).

She has also written a memoir, The Devil Within, published by Vermilion in 2008 and shortlisted for the Mind Book Award, which discusses her experiences living with clinical depression.

Merritt has appeared regularly as a critic and panellist on BBC Radio 4 and BBC Radio 4 Extra, has been a judge for the Costa Biography Award and the Orange New Writing Award as well as the Perrier Award, and is a regular interviewer and author at literary festivals, as well as the National Theatre. During 2007 and 2008, she curated the Talks and Debates programme on issues in contemporary arts and politics at London's Soho Theatre.

== Bibliography ==
=== As Stephanie Merritt ===
- Gaveston (2002)
- Real (2005)
- The Devil Within (nonfiction) (2008)
- While You Sleep (2018)
- Storm (2022)

=== As S. J. Parris ===
Series based on the Italian philosopher Giordano Bruno (1548–1600)

- Heresy (2010)
- Prophecy (2011)
- Sacrilege (2012)
- Treachery (2014)
- Conspiracy (2016)
- Execution (2020)
- The Dead of Winter (2020) (collects three prequel novellas: The Secret Dead (2014), The Academy of Secrets (2020) and A Christmas Requiem (2020))
- Alchemy (2023)

The prequel novellas that make up The Dead of Winter have been published separately as e-books as well.
