= Suroopa Mukherjee =

Indian writer

Suroopa Mukherjee is an Indian writer.

== Career ==
She is the author of several books for children and young people, including Bhopal Gas Tragedy: The Worst Industrial Disaster in Human History, a book about the Bhopal disaster. She teaches English literature at Hindu College, University of Delhi and is the coordinator of a student group dedicated to creating youth awareness on issues relating to environmental damage and corporate crime.

Across The Mystic Shore was her debut novel for adults, released by Macmillan New Writing in March 2007. Her most recent book "Surviving Bhopal" draws on oral testimonials of the affected community of the Bhopal disaster and analyzes the cause and aftermath of the disaster from the perspective of those who suffered the severe consequences of systemic failure and travesty of justice. The event resulted in a resistance movement, led by women, against corporate and state power. Mukherjee explores the underlying gender politics, showing how activism challenged and redefined the contemporary model of development.
