= Canelo (publisher) =

British publisher

- Parent company: DK, Penguin Random House
- Founded: 2015; 11 years ago London, England, UK
- Founders: Iain Millar; Michael Bhaskar; Nick Barreto
- Country of origin: United Kingdom
- Headquarters location: Cargo Works; London, England, UK
- Distribution: Macmillan Distribution (UK); Readerlink Distribution Services (US)
- Publication types: Books
- Official website: www.canelo.co

Canelo is a British publisher that launched in 2015. The three founding partners were Iain Millar, Michael Bhaskar and Nick Barreto and their chosen name, "Canelo", is the Spanish word for cinnamon.

Bhaskar is a former digital publishing director at Profile Books and author of The Content Machine, a history of publishing. He told The Guardian that their corporate goal was to bring the tools of traditional publishing: proofreading, editing, and work closely with authors, together with improved design of the digital page, to publish both fiction and non-fiction e-books.

In 2024, Canelo was acquired by DK, part of Penguin Random House.

The publisher has three main divisions: Canelo, including Canelo Romance and Canelo Crime; Hera, which focuses on popular fiction; and August, which focuses on non-fiction titles.
