= The Savage Garden (novel) =

2007 novel by Mark Mills

- Author: Mark Mills
- Language: English
- Genre: Mystery; Romance
- Publisher: Harper Perennial
- Publication date: 2007-02-05
- Publication place: England
- Media type: Paperback
- Pages: 400
- ISBN: 0-00-716193-X
- OCLC: 76074332

The Savage Garden is the second novel written by British author Mark Mills. Set in 1958, the story tells of Cambridge student Adam Strickland and his trip to Tuscany, Italy; which started off as a chance to study the old, Italian renaissance architecture of a garden owned by the aristocratic Docci family and results in Adam solving two murders: one from the 16th century and one at the end of World War II. His discoveries shake the entire lineage of the Docci clan including his love interest Antonella's life.

== Characters ==
- Adam Strickland – the story's protagonist, an English student studying at The University of Cambridge who goes to Tuscany to study the Docci family's Villa.
- Signora Francesca Docci - Elderly matriarch of the Docci clan, she owns the Villa Docci but at the start of the novel intends to give it to her son Maurizio. She grows very fond of Adam during his stay.
- Maria Docci
- Maurizio Docci - Son of Francesca Docci, he is wealthy but has avaricious eyes on Villa Docci.
- Gaetano - Former gardener of the Villa Docci, he was a witness to the murder of Emilio, and his silence was bought by Maurizio.
- Harry Strickland – Harry is Adam's older, fun-loving brother. Harry is a sculptor who often gets into little problems and disagreements with people, particularly with regard to entanglements with the fairer sex and their husbands/boyfriends. These entanglements often result in Adam having to help him out.
- Signora Fanelli – owner of The Pensione Amorini, the bar/restaurant above which Adam stayed. She is in a relationship with Fausto by the end of the book.
- Fausto - former partisan during the war, communist, aficionado of historic battles, and key person in Signora Docci's plot to manipulate Adam.
- Professor Crispin Leonard – One of Adam's lecturers and (unbeknown to him) father of Emilio Docci.
- Maria – the housekeeper to the Docci Villa and a confidant to Signora Docci. Maria became a key player in keeping Signora Docci's plan from both Maurizio and Adam.
- Emilio Docci – Signora Docci's son and unknowingly fathered by Professor Leonard. He was killed by his half brother Maurizio.
- Chiara Docci – Maurizio's beautiful and academic wife.
- Antonella Voli - She is the granddaughter of Signora Docci and daughter of Caterina Ballerini. She is a fashion designer and has played a mysterious character on a little flirtatious note with Adam. Later on, the love affair between Adam and her becomes strong, and they eventually end up together on a happy note. Mark Mills did a great job to raise suspicions around her character in a subtle way which somehow makes the protagonist, and the reader as well, believe that she deceived Adam.
- Gloria - Girlfriend of Adam's at the beginning of the story; her family owns a pile in Scotland, referred to as the "girl who likes to kill things", and budding novelist, she ends the relationship with Adam early on in the book saying that he is something between "boring" and "bland".

== See also ==
- Mark Mills (writer)
- The House at Riverton, a similar novel
