= Colin Rose =

English footballer

Personal information
- Full name: Colin James Rose
- Date of birth: 22 January 1972 (age 54)
- Place of birth: Winsford, England
- Height: 5 ft 8 in (1.73 m)
- Position: Midfielder

Youth career
- 198?–1990: Crewe Alexandra

Senior career*
Years	Team	Apps	(Gls)
1990–1992	Crewe Alexandra	22	(1)
1992–1997	Witton Albion		
- → Congleton Town (loan)
1997–1998	Macclesfield Town	19	(0)
1998	Gateshead	5	(0)
1998–????	Runcorn		
2000	Northwich Victoria	11	(0)
2000–2001	Leek Town		
2001–2002	Winsford United		
2002–2003	Witton Albion		
2003–200?	Middlewich Town		

International career
1996	England semi-pro	2	
- * Club domestic league appearances and goals

Colin James Rose (born 22 January 1972) is an English former professional footballer who played as a midfielder in the Football League for Crewe Alexandra and Macclesfield Town. He was in the starting eleven for Macclesfield's debut in the Football League, on 9 August 1997 at home to Torquay United. He also played non-league football for clubs including Witton Albion, Congleton Town, Gateshead, Runcorn, Northwich Victoria, Leek Town, Winsford United, and Middlewich Town. In 1996, Rose was capped twice for the England semi-pro national team.
