= Classen School of Advanced Studies =

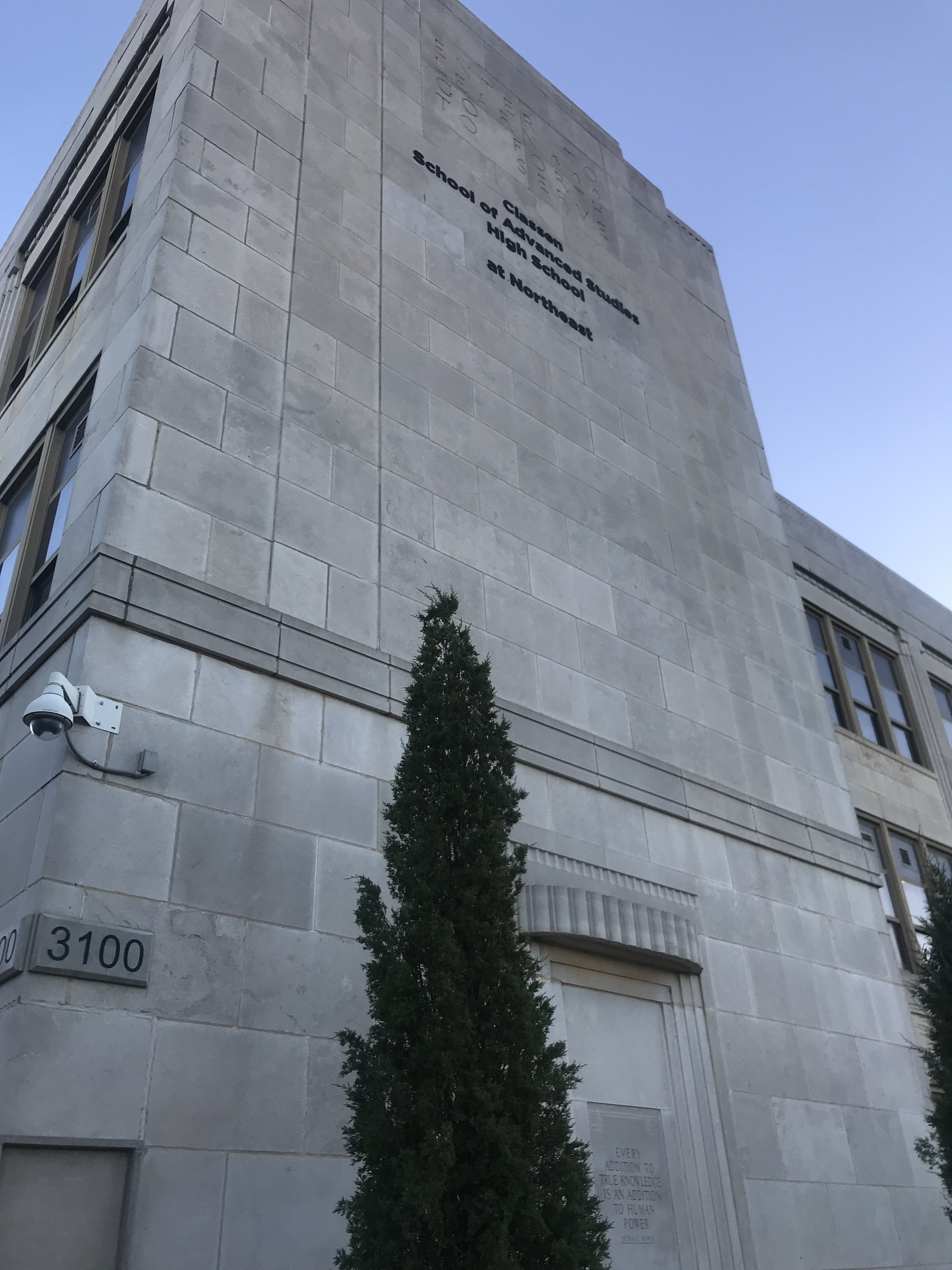
Classen School of Advanced Studies

Location
- 1901 North Ellison Street/3100 N Kelly ave Oklahoma City, Oklahoma 73106/73111; United States; 35°29′17″N 97°31′58″W

Information
- School type: Public, magnet high school
- Motto: Qui non proficit deficit
- Founded: 1919 (reopened as Classen SAS in 1994)
- School district: Oklahoma City Public Schools
- NCES District ID: 4022770
- Superintendent: Dr. Jamie C. Polk
- CEEB code: 372651
- NCES School ID: 402277001885
- Principal: Lorenzo Alferos (Middle School) Milton Bowens (High School)
- Teaching staff: 47.10 (on an FTE basis)
- Grades: 5-12
- Enrollment: 810 (9-12) (2023-2024)
- Student to teacher ratio: 17.10
- Campus: Urban
- Colors: Royal blue and gold
- Athletics: Basketball, baseball, cross country, football, soccer, softball, swimming, tennis, volleyball, track
- Athletics conference: OSSAA Class 5A
- Nickname: Comets
- USNWR ranking: 926
- Website: https://csashs.okcps.org/

Classen School of Advanced Studies, often referred to as Classen SAS, CSAS or simply Classen, are 2 public speciality schools serving students in grades 5–12 in Oklahoma City, Oklahoma. It consists of Classen SAS Middle School and Classen SAS High School @ Northeast. The Oklahoma City Public Schools program participates in the IB Diploma Programme and offers fine arts courses as well, offering art, drama, and music classes to any qualifying student.

Classen SAS High School @ Northeast is known as one of the state's premier high schools in academics, and has been ranked among the top 100 public high schools in America by the Challenge Index, as measured by the number of Advanced Placement, International Baccalaureate and/or Cambridge tests taken by all students at a school in 2007 divided by the number of graduating seniors. The index is published annually in The Washington Post and Newsweek. It was ranked 14 in 2009.

As Classen High School, the basketball team won state championships in 1929, 1934, 1937, 1948, 1950, 1975, and in 1980. In 1995, Classen SAS won the Class B State Championship in Academic Quiz Bowl and in 1996, Classen SAS was the Class 3A State Runner-Up in Academic Quiz Bowl. It is currently a Division 5A school.

== History ==
Classen Junior High School opened in 1919, immediately following the close of World War I, making it the oldest high school building in Oklahoma City Public Schools. The land was part of an area being developed by the early Oklahoma City real estate developer, Anton H. Classen. A total of 6.33 acres was purchased by the Oklahoma City Public Schools Board of Education for $55,100. The building was constructed at a cost of $420,500 by the Holmboe Construction Company.

The two story brick building was enlarged in 1921, 1923, 1925, 1934 and 1957. In 1925, Classen opened its doors to high school students and changed its name to Classen High School. Due to declining enrollment, Classen High School closed in 1985 and the building became a 5th-year center. In 1994, the Classen School of Advanced Studies opened with an enrollment size of 647, covering grades 6-10. Its first graduating class was graduated in May 1997.

=== Northeast High School ===
Northeast High School was a public high school in Oklahoma City, Oklahoma. It was merged with and subsumed into Classen School of Advanced Studies which took over its building. The school's student body was predominantly African American.

== Extracurricular activities ==
Classen SAS fields teams in OSSAA-sanctioned competition in basketball, baseball, football, softball, golf, dance team, cross country, soccer, tennis and volleyball, and track.

Clubs and organizations at the school include: Ambassador Corp, Asian Club, Builders Club, Black Student Union, Cheerleaders, Earth Club, French Club, German American Partnership Program (GAPP), German Club, Key Club, Latino Club, Mu Alpha Theta, National Art Honor Society, National Honor Society, Modern Music Masters (Tri-M Music Honors Society), Native American Club, Orchestra, Pep Band, Science Club, Spanish Club, Student Council, Thespian Society, Visual Arts Club, UFO, Young Democrats, Latin Club, Classen Choral Society, Comets Demand Action (safety group), Band Boosters (band council), Gender-Sexuality Alliance, Fireballs (pep club), Mock Trial, Bike Club, Culinary, E Sports, Girl Up, Club Med, and Young Libertarian.

== Notable alumni ==
=== Classen High School ===
- Jim Barnett, professional wrestling promoter
- Jerrie Cobb, aircraft pilot and member of the Mercury 13.
- Wayne Coyne, guitarist, lead singer, and songwriter of rock band The Flaming Lips
- Admiral William J. Crowe, Chairman of the Joint Chiefs of Staff, 1985–1989.
- Jimmy Edwards, professional football player
- Edith Kinney Gaylord, journalist, founder of Inasmuch Foundation and Ethics and Excellence in Journalism Foundation.
- David Hall, former governor of Oklahoma
- Van Heflin, actor
- Henry Iba, prolific former basketball coach, and coach at Classen High School and later at Oklahoma State University
- Patience Latting, first woman to serve as Mayor of Oklahoma City, first female mayor of a major American city.
- Jack McCracken, amateur basketball player, 1962 Naismith Memorial Basketball Hall of Fame inductee, 6x AAU All-American, 3x AAU Champion with the Denver Nuggets, named greatest AAU player of all time in 1939
- Cleta Mitchell, conservative lawyer, former Democratic legislator.
- James H. Norick, former mayor of Oklahoma City
- Dale Robertson, movie and television actor
- Claude Weaver III, World War II aceA
- Mareta West, the first female astrogeologist and chose the site of the Apollo 11 lunar landing.
