= Robert J. Ross =

American philanthropist

Robert J. (Bob) Ross is Chairman and CEO of Inasmuch Foundation. Founded in 1982 by Edith Kinney Gaylord, Inasmuch Foundation awards $25 million plus in grants each fiscal year to nonprofits supporting initiatives in community and civic engagement, education, human services, and journalism.

== Career & Education ==
Ross joined Inasmuch Foundation in 2003 as Vice President and Executive Director of Inasmuch Foundation and the Ethics & Excellence in Journalism Foundation. In 2005, Ross became President and CEO, and in 2014, the corporate entities merged and the Ethics and Excellence in Journalism Foundation became a wholly owned subsidiary of Inasmuch Foundation. In 2019, Ross was elected to Chairman and CEO.

Thanks to Bob’s involvement in the expansion of Educare to Oklahoma City in 2009, he earned a reputation as an education advocate with the moniker “Mr. Education.” Under Bob’s leadership, Inasmuch Foundation reached a major milestone in 2023 when the distribution of grant funding surpassed $350 million, the amount of founder Edith Kinney Gaylord’s original contribution.

Prior to his time at Inasmuch Foundation, Ross was employed as an attorney with the Oklahoma City law firm McAfee & Taft. He is a graduate of Bishop McGuinness Catholic High School in Oklahoma City and Washington and Lee University in Virginia, where he received a Bachelor of Science in Business Administration. At W&L, he was a co-chairman of the 1996 Mock Convention, which correctly predicted that Bob Dole would receive the Republican presidential nomination. After attending W&L, he received his J.D. from the University of Oklahoma in 1999.

== Community Involvement ==
In 2000, Ross was an alternate delegate to the Republican National Convention, representing the Oklahoma Republican party on the floor of the national convention.

Ross has also served in the following volunteer positions:

- Trustee, Will Rogers World Airport Trust, July 2022 - Present
- Member, University of Oklahoma Board of Regents, May 2022 - Present
- Board Member, Oklahoma Hall of Fame, January 2020 - Present
- LPAC Board Member, Acorn Growth Companies, January 2018 - Present
- Board Member, Oklahoma State Fair, May 2015 - Present
- Board Member, Greater Oklahoma City Chamber, January 2008 - Present
- Board Member, OKC Museum of Art, January 2007 - Present
- Board Member, Oklahoma City National Memorial & Museum, January 2007 - Present
- Trustee, Colorado College, August 2007 - July 2024
- Board Member, Oklahoma Public School Resource Center, January 2016 - February 2024
- Board Member, Oklahoma Board of Education, April 2015 - April 2019
- Trustee, University of Oklahoma Foundation, August 2009 - August 2018
- Board Member, Sunbeam Family Services, July 2006 - June 2017
- Board Member, Oklahoma City Educare, July 2006 - June 2017
- Board Member, Teach for America Oklahoma, May 2011 - May 2016
- Board Member, Smart Start Central Oklahoma, January 2006 - June 2014
- Board Member, Oklahoma City Public Schools Foundation, January 2004 - January 2009

== Honors & Awards ==
Ross has received the following honors and awards for his service to Oklahoma City:

- 50 Most Powerful Oklahomans, Issued by OKC Friday, June 2024
- Champion of Youth: Aubrey K. McClendon Lifetime Achievement Award, Issued by Boys & Girls Club of Oklahoma County, May 2023
- E.C. Joullian Distinguished Citizen Award, Issued by Boy Scouts of America Last Frontier Council, March 2023
- Community Engagement & Collaboration Award, Issued by Possibilities Inc, December 2022
- Outstanding Eagle Scout Award, Issued by Boy Scouts of America Last Frontier Council, December 2020
- Aspire Award, Issued by Sunbeam Family Services, June 2020
- OKCityan of the Year, Issued by OKC Friday, January 2019
- Beyond Z Award, Issued by KIPP Public Charter Schools, August 2017
- Door-Opener Award, Issued by ASTEC Charter Schools, September 2015
- John Rex Community Builder Award, Issued by United Way of Central Oklahoma, January 2015
- Visionary Impact Award, Issued by Oklahoma Center for Nonprofits, November 2013
- Mayor’s Award for Distinguished Service, Issued by OKC Beautiful, March 2012
- Urban Pioneer Award, Issued by Plaza District Association, June 2011
- Regents Award, Issued by The University of Oklahoma, May 2009

== Personal life ==
Ross was born in Oklahoma City, Oklahoma on January 11, 1974, to William Jarboe and Mary Lillian Ross. He is married to Heather Nicole Ross and has a daughter, Lillian Margaret Ross, and a son, Francis Joseph Ross. He lives in Oklahoma City.

Ross is an 89er. His great-grandfather George Ross made the Oklahoma Land Run on April 22, 1889, staking a plot of land on a corner of California Avenue in Oklahoma City, where he built a bakery.
