= Redd Crabtree =

American horse trainer (1935–2015)

- Birth name: Charles Crabtree, Jr.
- Occupation: Horse trainer and breeder
- Discipline: Saddle seat
- Born: September 5, 1935; Aberdeen, Arkansas
- Died: January 19, 2015 (aged 79); Louisville, Kentucky
- Major wins/Championships: Five-Gaited Stallion World's Championship 1966, 2010; Five-Gaited Gelding World's Championship 1971; Three-Gaited Two-Year-Old World's Championship, 1982; Three-Gaited Two-Year-Old World's Championship, 1983; Five-Gaited World's Grand Championship 1975, 1978, 1997; Two-Year-Old Five-Gaited World's Championship 1999
- Lifetime achievements: President of United Professional Horsemens Association; Director/Vice president of American Saddlebred Horse Association

Honors
- UPHA Hall of Fame, 1994; C. J. Cronin Sportsmanship Award, 1994 & 2014; ASHA Lifetime Achievement Award, 2010; KY Athletic Hall of Fame, 2014; Rock Creek Horse Show Hall of Fame, 2014

Significant horses
- Chief of Greystone, Glory Kalarama, Burning Tree's Good Omen, Dow Jones, Burning Tree's Big Country, Will Shriver, Cora's Time, Supreme Heir, The New Yorker, Zorvoorbij Commander in Chief, Swish, Callaway's Bluesman, Epic Hero

Redd Crabtree (1935–2015) was an American Saddlebred horse trainer. Crabtree, the son of notable Saddlebred trainers and saddle seat riding teachers Helen and Charles Crabtree, who owned Crabtree Stables, won three Five-Gaited World's Grand Championships and multiple World's Championships in the World's Championship Horse Show. He was president of the United Professional Horsemens Association, vice president and a director of the American Saddlebred Horse Association and was inducted into three Halls of Fame. Redd Crabtree died on January 19, 2015.

== Life and career ==
=== Early life ===
Redd Crabtree was born on September 5, 1935, to Poland Jones and Susan Goodwin of Aberdeen, Arkansas. When he was 9 years old his biological mother died and his father remarried, placing him and two younger siblings in a Catholic orphanage. When he was older, he applied for a job at the stables a short distance from the orphanage. Notable horse trainers Helen and Charles Crabtree were working for the stable at the time and took a liking to Redd, teaching him how to ride. At the age of 13 he was adopted by the Crabtrees, who later moved to Tennessee. Both his adoptive parents were horse trainers who focused on American Saddlebreds, and Crabtree followed them into the horse industry as a professional trainer. In 1958 the Crabtrees moved from Tennessee to Shelby County, Kentucky, and bought a farm that they named Crabtree Stables, which became their permanent home. Crabtree Stables became notable within a short time and is given credit for establishing Shelby County as a major Saddlebred center. In one year the Crabtrees showed 58 horses at the Kentucky State Fair.

=== Career and honors ===
Redd Crabtree was best known for competing in the five-gaited division of the American Saddlebred industry, meaning the horses he rode and trained performed at a walk, trot, canter, slow gait and rack; three-gaited Saddlebreds only perform a walk, trot and canter. He trained with his adoptive parents for several years before striking out on his own in 1960. For a time he worked for Lee Roby, who trained a horse named The Replica who competed against Earl Teater and Wing Commander. He later trained at Tampa Yacht Club in Florida, Plainview Stables in Kentucky and Greystone Manor in Pennsylvania.

He won the Junior Five-Gaited Stallion World's Championship and the Five-Gaited Stallion World's Championship with Chief of Greystone in 1966. In 1968 he returned to Shelby County and Crabtree Stables, where he trained for the rest of his life. He repeated the Five-Gaited Stallion World's Championship the next year. In 1971 he won the Five-Gaited Gelding World's Championship on Glory Kalarama. Redd Crabtree trained three Saddlebreds who won the Five-Gaited World's Grand Championship in the World's Championship Horse Show. His first winner was Will Shriver, a stallion owned by Callaway Hills, in 1975. His second World's Grand Championship was won in 1978 with the horse Cora's Time. From 1973 to 1975 Crabtree was president of the American Saddlebred Museum. During the early 1970s he won Two-Year-Old Five-Gaited World's Championships with three different horses, Burning Tree's Good Omen, Dow Jones, and Burning Tree's Big Country. In 1980 a chestnut colt owned by Mrs. F. D. Sinclair was foaled at Crabtree Stables. The owner wanted to geld him, but Redd Crabtree told her that his conformation was so good that even if he did not win horse shows he could be an excellent sire. The colt, named Supreme Heir, was ridden and trained by Crabtree. He won the 1982 Three-Gaited Two-Year-Old World's Championship and the Three-Gaited Three-Year-Old World's Championship the next year. Supreme Heir was later sold to Hallston Manor and had a notable career as a sire.

He was inducted into the Kentucky State Fair Hall of Fame in 1993 and the United Professional Horsemens Association (UPHA) Hall of Fame in 1994. The same year he was also given the C. J. Cronin Sportsmanship Award for the first time.

His third and final World's Grand Champion was Zorvoorbij Commander in Chief, a South African horse, in 1997. In addition to those three horses, he trained multiple World's Champions and won every five-gaited division in the World's Championship Horse Show at least once, some multiple times. In 1999 he won the Two-Year-Old Five-Gaited World's Championship with Swish, a horse he bred. His last World's Championship was with Callaway's Bluesman, who won the Five-Gaited Stallion World's Championship in 2010. The same year was given the Lifetime Achievement Award by the American Saddlebred Horse Association. In addition to riding professionally himself, Crabtree taught riding lessons and mentored adult amateur riders. Among his more notable students were Mary Gaylord McClean, Mary Lou Gallegher, and Randi Stuart. Stuart owned a mare named Summer Melody, and under Crabtree's coaching the pair won Amateur Five-Gaited Champion of Champions titles in both 1976 and 1977. Gallegher and her horse Heathermoor's Lad O'Shea won Junior Exhibitor Five-Gaited World's Champion of Champions in 1977 and 1978. Crabtree was president of the United Professional Horsemens Association, a director and vice president of the American Saddlebred Horse Association, and director of both the American Saddlebred Registry and the Kentucky Saddlebred Owners and Breeders Association. Crabtree was inducted into both the Rock Creek Horse Show Hall of Fame and the Kentucky Athletic Hall of Fame in 2014. He was the first show horse trainer or breeder to be inducted into the latter Hall of Fame. The same year he won the five-gaited stake at the Rock Creek Horse Show with Epic Hero and was given a second C. J. Cronin Sportsmanship Award.

=== Personal life and death ===
Crabtree and his wife Nancy were married in 1960. They had three children; Casey, Ann, and Susan. Casey also became a horse trainer at Crabtree Stables. In addition to his work with horses, Crabtree was a fan of University of Kentucky's basketball team and was an Alcoholics Anonymous sponsor. Redd Crabtree died on January 19, 2015, of pancreatic cancer. He had only been diagnosed a short time before. He was 79 years old. His death was on the anniversary of six-time World's Grand Champion Wing Commander's death. Nancy Crabtree, Redd's wife, only outlived him by a short time and died in November 2015.

Following Redd Crabtree's death, the American Saddlebred Horse Association declared him their Member of the Day on August 24, 2015. It was the opening day of the World's Championship Horse Show, and ASHA asked attendees to wear red clothing to that night's show in Crabtree's memory.
