= Jim Lange (cartoonist) =

American cartoonist

James Jacob Lange (August 15, 1926 – April 16, 2009) was an American cartoonist who worked for The Oklahoman for 58 years and produced over 19,000 cartoons.

== Biography ==
Lange was born in Winnebago, Minnesota. While he was a youth, the family moved to Dubuque, Iowa. He joined the U.S. Air Force during World War II. In Iowa he met Helen Johnstone, whom he later married.

After his military service, Lange attended the Chicago Academy of Fine Arts. He and Helen moved to Oklahoma, where he got a job as an editorial cartoonist, hired by newspaper mogul Edward Gaylord. He started work for The Oklahoman on October 1, 1950. His first cartoon featured Oklahoma Governor Roy Turner.

Lange co-founded the Association of American Editorial Cartoonists and served as its President during the 1980s. He was inducted into the Oklahoma Journalism Hall of Fame in 1993.

Lange's work was collected in a 1994 collection published by The Oklahoman. He was known for his everyman character, called "Mr. Voter" or "John Q. Public", described in an Oklahoman editorial as "bespectacled, mustachioed, fedora-wearing". In 2006 the Oklahoma State Senate voted to make this character the "state's official editorial cartoon."

Lange was forced to retire in October 2008 after 150 members of staff took buyouts, retired early or were laid off. He retired after 58 years of service. Lange died on April 16, 2009, at the age of 82.

He and Helen had four children; he was survived by his wife and three children.
