= Roger C. Frizzell =

Roger Clifton Frizzell
- Born: September 21, 1960 (age 65)
- Citizenship: American
- Education: University of Oklahoma
- Occupation: Chief Communications Officer
- Spouse: Janna Rhodes Frizzell
- Parent(s): Charles and Gayle Frizzell

Roger Clifton Frizzell is a four-time NCAA All-American, placing 4th, 3rd, 3rd, and 3rd. Frizzell record career is 115-24-2 at University of Oklahoma.

== Biography ==
In December 1982, Frizzell did his bachelor's in Public Relations from Gaylord College, at the University of Oklahoma.

Frizzell served as a Chief Communications Officer and VP of Corporate Communications for American Airlines (2003-2011) and Pacific Gas & Electric, San Francisco. Prior to this role, he held executive positions at AT&T, Hewlett Packard, and Compaq. In 2013, he joined Carnival Corporation as a Senior VP of corporate communications and chief communications officer. He retired in 2022.

He led the communications effort to keep wrestling in the Olympics.

In January 1983, Rodger married to Janna Frizzell.

== Awards and recognition ==
- S (Silver) - U.S. Senior National Freestyle Wrestling Championships, 1979
- B (Bronze) - U.S. Senior National Freestyle Championships, 1981
- G (Gold) - U.S. Under 20 National Freestyle Wrestling Championships, 1979
- S (Silver) - U.S. University National Freestyle Wrestling Championships, 1981
- Outstanding American award by National Wrestling Hall of Fame, 2010.
