= Christy Gaylord Everest =

Former chair and chief executive officer of Oklahoma Publishing Company

Christy Gaylord Everest (born 1951) is the former chair and chief executive officer of Oklahoma Publishing Company, which formerly published The Oklahoman which is currently published by GateHouse Media since October 1, 2018. It was announced on September 15, 2011, that all Oklahoma Publishing Company (OPUBCO) assets, including The Oklahoman, would be sold to Denver based businessman Philip Anschutz and his Anschutz Corporation. The sale of OPUBCO to Philip Anschutz closed in October 2011. The newspaper had been owned by her family since before Oklahoma statehood in 1907. She is the daughter of Edward L. Gaylord, the niece of Edith Kinney Gaylord, and the granddaughter of Edward K. Gaylord. Everest is a former chair of the University of Oklahoma Board of Regents.
