= David Deming (geologist) =

American geologist and climate change denialist

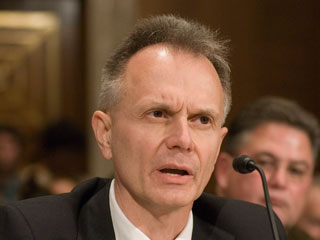
- Deming during testimony before the United States Senate, 2006.
- Born: 1954 (age 71–72); Terre Haute, Indiana, US
- Education: Indiana University Bloomington, University of Utah
- Scientific career
- Fields: Geology, Hydro Geology, Political Commentary

David Deming (born 1954), is an American former geology professor and self-proclaimed climate change denier and "conversative polemicist" who is an associate professor of Arts and Sciences at the University of Oklahoma in Norman. He graduated from North Central High School in Indianapolis, Indiana in 1972. He then attended Indiana University Bloomington, graduating in 1983 with a BS degree in geology, and received a Ph.D. in geophysics from the University of Utah in 1988. Prior to his arrival at the University of Oklahoma in 1992, Deming held a National Research Council postdoctoral fellowship at the U.S. Geological Survey in California. From 1992 through 2003, Deming was an assistant and associate professor in the School of Geology and Geophysics at the University of Oklahoma. Known for his climate change denial and outspoken conservative views on social issues, Deming was involved in two major disputes with the OU administration, one leading to a lawsuit. Deming is the author of more than thirty research papers and the textbook Introduction to Hydrogeology. He is an associate editor for the academic journals Petroleum Geoscience and was an adjunct faculty member at two conservative think tanks, the Oklahoma Council of Public Affairs and the National Center for Policy Analysis

== Views on issues ==
=== Energy and the environment ===
Deming has identified himself with the Cornucopian school of environmental thought, and has consistently criticized Malthusian theory. In 1998, he wrote "although world population has increased by more than a factor of six over the last 200 years, we are all aware that the average standard of living has risen dramatically—in direct contradiction to Malthusian theory." Deming considers the "fundamental flaw" in Malthusian theory to be that "it fails to take into account the exponential growth in resources that occurs through technological advances." He has questioned if Malthus' hypothesis is scientific as it resists empirical falsification.

In a letter published in the American Association of Petroleum Geologists magazine, the Explorer, in 2002, Deming wrote that "prior to World War II, the central principle upon which our civilization was ordered was progress - the idea that the application of scientific knowledge results in improved standards of living," but "in the latter half of the 20th century, the idea of progress was replaced by an anti-scientific environmentalism based on a mythological primitive harmony that has never existed."

Deming has criticized "sustainability" as a misleading concept, a chimera," at least as far as it pertains to technology, pointing out that "present day technologies and practices are never sustainable, nor should we expect them to be . . . . [P]rojections of current technology into the future are always invalid because technology does not stand still . . . . [T]echnological progress is our birthright and destiny." In 2003, speaking at a meeting of the Oklahoma Independent Petroleum Association, Deming said, "I think it would be foolish to try to predict what our technological capabilities will be [100 years from now], just as it would have been foolish for someone from the 19th century to try to predict what we could do today."

Deming does not believe in Peak Oil theories and has pointed out that "predictions of imminent oil shortages have been made throughout the twentieth century . . . [but] all previous predictions have been false." He has criticized the Hubbert model of peak oil production as flawed because "Hubbert-type analyses . . . depend on an estimate of the total resource size . . . [but] the history of resources assessments shows that in the last 50 years, estimates of oil reserves have risen as fast or faster than cumulative oil production."

Deming believes that alternative energy technologies are not sufficiently evolved to add significantly to the world energy budget in the immediate future, arguing that "wind and solar power are . . . intermittent, expensive, unreliable, and incompatible with the existing power grid infrastructure . . . [and cannot] be used directly for transportation. In contrast, fossil fuels are abundant, reliable, and inexpensive energy sources." He believes "the largest mistake would be to start to move away from petroleum, a proven and economic energy source, to more speculative and expensive sources," pointing out that "natural gas is . . . abundant, relatively inexpensive and environmentally benign," and that "nuclear power has the potential to provide large amounts of power for very long periods of time if low-grade uranium is used in breeder reactors."

Writing in The Washington Times in 2003, Deming claimed that "the seminal event that transformed the United States into an industrial and technological powerhouse" was the discovery of oil at Spindletop, Texas, in 1901. He argued that "the cheap energy provided by abundant oil allowed the U.S. to transform itself from a rural, agrarian country into an urban, industrialized nation," and maintained that "petroleum continues to be the lifeblood of our technological civilization." Deming has stated, "human progress depends on abundant and inexpensive energy from fossil fuels, including petroleum," and that "human progress is sustainable only if we maintain an optimistic attitude, continue to increase our prosperity and energy utilization, and invest in education and research." He maintains that "the greatest danger to human civilization today is not environmental degradation, but a return to the ancient plague of pessimism."

=== Global warming and climate change ===
Deming has criticized global warming predictions, citing "media hysteria . . . generated by journalists who don't understand the provisional and uncertain nature of scientific knowledge."

In a 1995 opinion piece published in the "Perspective" section of Science, Deming reviewed published analyses of borehole temperature data in North America and concluded "the magnitude of the observed warning . . . is still within the range of estimated natural variability . . . a cause and effect relationship between anthropogenic activities and climatic warming cannot be demonstrated unambiguously at the present time."

In 1998, Deming wrote an editorial where he said that the worldwide borehole temperature record indicated present day temperatures were not anomalously warm: "when compared to the period of time over which human civilization rose, present day temperatures are colder than average. Even if mean global temperature were to rise another degree, it would still be colder than it has been for much of the last 10,000 years."

In a March 2005, editorial in Investor's Business Daily, Deming compared Naomi Oreskes' claim of 100 percent scientific consensus on global warming to "the October 2002 election in Iraq, where Saddam Hussein received 100% of the vote." Criticizing a December 26, 2004, The Washington Post editorial by Oreskes where she wrote "we need to stop repeating nonsense about the uncertainty of global warming," Deming quoted Francis Bacon's admonition, "if we begin in certainty, we will end in doubts."

On December 6, 2006, Deming testified before the US Senate committee on the Environmental and Public Works, concluding that

The amount of climatic warming that has taken place in the past 150 years is poorly constrained, and its cause--human or natural--is unknown. There is no sound scientific basis for predicting future climate change with any degree of certainty. If the climate does warm, it is likely to be beneficial to humanity rather than harmful. In my opinion, it would be foolish to establish national energy policy on the basis of misinformation and irrational hysteria.

Deming was quoted in The Christian Science Monitor as stating "too little is known about how the climate system works to overhaul economies in an effort to affect it." According to the Oklahoma Daily, he argued "there is not one person on Earth who has ever been killed or harmed by global warming."

On March 1, 2007, Deming debated David Karoly, then a climatology professor at the University of Oklahoma, on global warming. Deming stated, "[S]ome people want to enlist science in a moral crusade." Continuing, he claimed "science is a disinterested search for truth" and warned against anyone claiming a monopoly on evidence over any scientific subject. Following this line of reasoning, Deming further emphasized that "global warming is a scientific question, not a moral one," and argued that "the projection that the temperatures are becoming warmer is nothing more than speculation." According to an Associated Press report, Deming also objected to the fact that China and India are exempt from the Kyoto Protocol.

Deming has described the film An Inconvenient Truth as "an artful and deceptive propaganda film" and stated that "the claims made in An Inconvenient Truth are either wrong, disingenuous, or misleading." He has called carbon taxes "stupidity taxes" and argued that carbon dioxide is not a pollutant and that warm temperatures are generally beneficial for human beings.

In December 2007, Deming published an editorial in The Washington Times ("Year of Global Cooling") where he stated that "in 2007, hundreds of people died, not from global warming, but from cold weather hazards." Deming stated that "the mean planetary temperature hasn't increased significantly for nearly nine years," and concluded that "global warming has long since passed from scientific hypothesis to pseudo-scientific mumbo-jumbo."

In 2009, Deming published a pair of editorials to the paleoconservative website LewRockwell.com entitled "Why I Deny Global Warming" and "Global Warming Is a Fraud". In them, Deming advances arguments, among others, that it is effectively impossible to measure global surface temperatures.

=== Intelligent design ===
In an article published in Earth-Science Reviews, titled "Design, Science and Naturalism" (2008, vol. 90, p. 49-70), Deming concluded that intelligent design cannot be formulated as a scientific hypothesis. In 2011, he published an article on the Paleoconservative blog LewRockwell.com titled "Doubting Darwin". In it, he defends his decision to sign the Discovery Institute's "Dissent from Darwinism" statement. He complains that "Darwin is a sacred cow that cannot be questioned" to a "fanatical core of atheists and materialists" in the biological sciences, especially singling out Zoology for criticism. While he rejects the creationist label, he repeats well-trodden creationist arguments, including falsely asserting a paucity of transitional fossils.

In 2026, he published a piece advancing the view that the Cambrian explosion was caused by directed panspermia. The piece was published on the Journal of Cosmology, a pro-panspermia website presenting described by Jeffrey Beale as a predatory journal.

=== Affirmative action ===
Deming has consistently opposed affirmative action for women, arguing that inequalities in employment statistics do not necessarily arise from discriminatory practices.

As early as 1995, Deming suggested that "it is entirely plausible that a substantial portion of sex-based cognitive differences may be biological in origin." However, he noted that "individual variations within each gender are greater than differences between genders" and that "discrimination against individuals . . . arises from ignorance and should be condemned."

In 1998, Deming authored a guest column in the Oklahoma Daily where he argued that there may be "biological differences between the sexes that may contribute to men's tendency to favor engineering . . . . On average, females have better verbal abilities than males. Males, however, tend to be superior in visual-spatial skills and mathematics, both of which may be important in engineering." Deming wrote:

There is significant scientific evidence that sex-based differences in spatial and mathematical abilities may be biological in origin. For example, male rats do better in mazes than females. I concede it is possible that those female rats performed poorly because they were distressed by the lack of proper role models, but somehow this seems implausible.

On nature.com, Deming again argued that inequalities in employment statistics could be affected by biological differences, concluding "in previous generations, women were discouraged and actively prevented from choosing careers in the physical sciences. This is no longer true . . . when people with different abilities and inclinations make decisions in a free society, inequalities result."

In 2001, Deming, writing about the field of higher education, opined that "the bias against men in my profession is so profound, that it is now a universally accepted cultural norm in professional and academic communities." Deming has admitted that "Western Civilization has a long history of misogyny," but insisted that "there is no institutional or private employer in the US today that openly discriminates against women." He argued that equity does not require numerical equality, and claimed that women in the US enjoy some specific advantages over men:

Women in US colleges receive better grades than men and are more likely to graduate. On average, US women live five years longer than men, and therefore receive five additional years of Social Security payments. Wouldn't it be fairer if the retirement age for men was five years earlier than for women? Ninety-three percent of all people incarcerated in US prisons are men. If equity is synonymous with numerical equality, then why don't we start paroling men earlier and begin prosecuting women more vigorously?"

=== Views on gun control ===
In a 1994 article co-authored with University of Oklahoma law professor Robert B. Smith, Deming and Smith concluded "the Second Amendment safeguards an individual right; the militia consists of people who have a right to keep and bear arms." In 1997, Deming argued that gun ownership was "net benefit to our society," and described the Second Amendment as protecting "an inalienable natural right...that exists whether it is in the Bill of Rights or not." In a 2013 article in the Wall Street Journal he wrote an article entitled "What the Oil Business Could Learn From the NRA".

=== Views on social responsibility ===
In a 2008 newspaper column Deming wrote that

"The United States was founded by people who wanted nothing more than freedom and the opportunity to work toward a better life for their children. But within a few generations, the progeny of the pioneers have turned into dolts who can't take responsibility for anything. . .So long as Americans look to other people for the solution of their problems, they will invariably be disappointed. The American people need to stop whining like spoiled children and take charge of their lives."

=== Views on homosexuality ===
In 2015, Deming claimed that the consequence of homosexuality is syphilis, which he holds is a fundamentally different disease between heterosexuals and homosexuals.

== Academic freedom controversies ==
=== Sexual harassment charges ===
In February 2000, Deming wrote a letter criticizing Yale University student Joni Kletter's February 18, 2000, syndicated article on gun control published in the University of Oklahoma's student newspaper, The Oklahoma Daily—a letter for which the professor was charged for sexual harassment. In her article, Kletter had claimed that "easy access to a handgun allows everyone in this country . . . to quickly and easily kill as many random people as they want." In his rebuttal, Deming wrote

"I just want to point out that Kletter's 'easy access' to a vagina enables her to 'quickly and easily' have sex with 'as many random people' as she wants. Her possession of an unregistered vagina also equips her to work as a prostitute and spread venereal diseases. Let's hope Kletter is as responsible with her equipment as most gun owners are with theirs."

In an article published in the academic journal Sexuality and Culture in 2001, Deming stated that he had not been motivated in his response to Kletter by the fact that, in his words, "For years, the campus newspaper at the University of Oklahoma had been printing vile attacks on both the right to own guns and people who were part of the gun culture." These remarks included statements that the desire to own guns was "an addiction," and "an irrational need for empowerment," comparisons of NRA members to "the Beverly Hillbillies," and claims that the Second Amendment "was used as a means of killing American Indians and stealing their land," and "so slave owners could have guns to keep slaves from rebelling."

College of Geoscience Dean John T. Snow reprimanded Deming for the Oklahoma Daily letter. A March 23, 2000 press release by the Foundation for Individual Rights in Education (FIRE), a non-profit organization whose stated mission is "to defend and sustain individual rights at America's colleges and universities" characterized Snow's letter as "alarming":

The Dean of the Colleges of Geosciences, John T. Snow, sent an alarming letter to Deming that excoriated him for expressing himself, accused him of lowering morale, and berated him for upsetting the president's office by occasioning a large number of phone calls from media and alumni. In fact, of course, the protection of freedom at a public university is an honor and essential task, not a distraction . . . . The days of academic "McCarthyism" remain with us; the targets, of course, change with time. Ironically, Snow's chilling letter directs Deming to "show due respect for the opinions of others."

Deming's remarks were criticized on campus, often by self-identified feminists. In a letter to the Oklahoma Daily published February 25, 2000, Women's Studies professor Julia Ehrhardt complained that she was "insulted" by Deming's letter which "intimates that . . . a woman is merely the sum of her sexual parts." However, Deming found support for his views in the wider community. Legal assistance was provided by the Center for Individual Rights and attorney Andrew W. Lester. Reader's letters published by the Daily Oklahoman on March 4, 2000, were almost entirely in Deming's favor. As one writer explained:

My hat's off to professor Deming. Gun owners are tired of being blamed for the acts of criminals. Deming's comparison of a vagina to a handgun illustrates the frustration that so many law-abiding citizens feel in the wake of continued attacks on Second Amendment rights.

In March 2000, the University of Oklahoma dismissed the sexual harassment charges filed against Deming. However, four of the complainants filed appeals, resulting in a closed hearing before a faculty panel that took place on April 27, 2000. The Center for Individual Rights (CIR) "questioned the decision to bar lawyers from speaking at the April 27 hearing. In response, the University set up a hearing for May 5. There, in a public forum, OU general counsel Joseph Harroz dropped all complaints" In a memorandum, Harroz explained that "the University may not take any adverse action against Dr. Deming," because his statements were protected by the First Amendment.

Deming reached a final settlement with the University of Oklahoma on October 24, 2000. According to the terms of the settlement, the university agreed that Deming's letter "did not violate the University's sexual harassment/sexual assault policy." The University of Oklahoma also agreed to "not take any adverse action against Dr. Deming or retaliate against him in any way." In a November 1, 2000, editorial, the Oklahoman characterized the settlement as a "free speech victory," and concluded "a college campus, of all places, ought to encourage the free flow of ideas."

=== Continued First Amendment controversy ===
Although OU had promised not to retaliate against Deming, the Daily Oklahoman reported that "it continued to unconstitutionally monitor his communication with newspapers." OU reportedly considered Deming's public opinions in his annual reviews.

In December 2003, the University of Oklahoma "removed [Deming] from his department, stripped him of most of his classes, and moved his office to a converted basement lab, all while claiming to respect the principles of academic freedom." According to the Foundation for Individual Rights in Education (FIRE), "OU administrators schemed to marginalize him and isolate him for his attempts at whistleblowing and for his political expression."

As described by FIRE, "Roger Slatt, Director of the School of Geology and Geophysics, began to unconstitutionally monitor Deming's letters to the newspaper and include them in three professional evaluations, until directed to stop by OU President David L. Boren. A former US Senator, Boren had stated in a 2001 editorial, "a university is a place of many diverse viewpoints where free speech is encouraged." In June 2003, Boren wrote to Deming, saying, "I fully agree with you that your political views should not be included as a factor in your post-tenure review." In a July 24, 2003 email, Dean Snow complained that "it is doubly frustrating that President Boren...has shown such sympathy for Deming.", and wrote that he would try to convince Deming's department head to " basically ignore and then marginalize Deming.… As long as we keep our i's dotted and our t's crossed, all Deming can really do is make noise and cause a bit more paperwork."

A major impetus to Deming's transfer was evidently the dissatisfaction of Robert L. Stephenson, an OU alumnus and major donor. On November 4, 2003, an attorney representing Stephenson wrote to University of Oklahoma provost Nancy Mergler, complaining that Deming was "pursuing academic and personal interests outside of and not supportive of the School's mission." The letter warned that if Mr. Stephenson's concerns were not addressed, "his efforts and donations on behalf of the School will not continue."

In a February 27, 2004 article in The Chronicle of Higher Education, Karen S. Humes, a former OU professor now at the University of Idaho, was quoted as stating that Deming's transfer was part of an administrative pattern in the College of Geosciences. Humes claimed that "The administration in that college was quite willing to subvert normal procedures to make sure their agenda was followed."

In July 2004, Deming filed a First Amendment lawsuit against a group of administrators at the University of Oklahoma, including "Roger Slatt, director of the School of Geology and Geophysics, and J.T. Snow, dean of the College of Geosciences." On December 24, 2005, the Oklahoman reported "U.S. District Judge Vicki Miles-Lagrange on Friday denied the University's motion to dismiss the lawsuit." Deming and OU later reached a settlement out of court, with Deming transferring to the College of Arts and Sciences.
