= David Deming =

David Deming may refer to:

- David Deming (economist)
- David Deming (geologist)
