= OU Daily =

Newspaper produced at the University of Oklahoma, U.S.

- Type: Student newspaper
- Format: Tabloid
- School: University of Oklahoma
- Owner: OU Student Media
- Founded: 1916; 110 years ago
- Headquarters: Copeland Hall, 860 Van Vleet, Room 160, Norman, Oklahoma 73019
- Circulation: 2,500
- ISSN: 0030-171X
- Website: oudaily.com

OU Daily, formally known as The Oklahoma Daily, is the independent, student-produced news organization at the University of Oklahoma, which reaches millions of readers annually online along with a print circulation of 2,500. Though it maintains a connection with OU's Gaylord College of Journalism and Mass Communication, the news organization is not a part of the required learning for journalism students at OU. Some classes, however, are offered at The Daily for academic credit.

The Daily is operated by OU Student Media, a division of Student Affairs, which also previously housed Sooner yearbook, Sower magazine and the OU Visitor Guide. Students are hired year round on both a paid and volunteer basis. The editor-in-chief is the only person to serve an entire school year in the same position, and the editorial board changes every semester.

Because The Daily no longer owns an on-campus printer, editions are printed at The Norman Transcript.

== History, circulation and OU Publications Board ==
In 1897, five years after the University of Oklahoma opened its doors, the first student-run newspaper, The Umpire, made its debut. In 1903, it became a semi-weekly news publication called the University Oklahoman. By 1916, the paper had taken on the name that it still carries today, The Oklahoma Daily.

In the fall of 1921, the circulation for The Daily was 700, plus 200 mail subscribers. By 1926, circulation had reached 6,000. Also that year, The Daily became a member of the Associated Press — the only college paper at that time with full voting and membership rights.

A poll in December 1946 showed that 72 percent of the student body read The Daily. In May 1956, a libel suit was filed against editor George Gravely and faculty supervisor Louise B. Moore. The suit was dismissed as groundless, but it marked the first time The Daily had been sued for libel.

The Daily moved into Copeland Hall – its current location – in the fall of 1958 (although the building didn't get that name for three more years). The paper was printed using hot metal, or lead type, set on Linotypes for body type, and a Ludlow for headlines. The shop also had an Elrod machine for lead spacing and a 600-pound (270 kg) gas-fired cauldron for remelting the lead and water-cooled molds for pouring lead pigs for recycle. The lead had to be remelted from the "Hell box" about once a week.

The flatbed E model bidirectional web-fed press which used the type directly was replaced about a decade later by a Goss Suburban web-fed offset press of six units, two stacked (total of four) and two additional inline. The page makeup was still hot metal as before. But each page was now pulled on a hand-operated proof press. The photo areas were masked out with black paper and this was photographed on a large Litho camera to produce a tabloid size page negative for each page. The photos were processed separately and pasted into the "windows" produced by the black rectangles on the proof pages. These page negatives were then burned in pairs onto hand-sensitized aluminum plates with an arc exposure unit and hand-developed and mounted on the offset press units. A typical press run for the 14,000 or so copies printed was 40 minutes. For many years it continued in this hybrid mode using a backshop staffed by trained journalism students working as paid student labor under the direction of a professional backshop supervisor and offset pressmen. As a tabloid the six units could print 48 tabloid pages, which was almost more than its quarter folder could handle. Typically this press ran 12 to 32 tabloid pages daily, 16 pages or 24 pages being favored sizes, a much more comfortable size for the folder. It could register and print full-page process color with high quality and did on occasion, using the two stacked units. The backshop and offset press occupied a large area on the north side of the first floor of Copeland Hall.

In 1976, The Daily entered the computer age with a system that used video display terminals and a scanner to read typed copy. The paper was switched to broadsheet format in 1977.

The Daily's coverage of the 1995 Oklahoma City bombing was recognized nationally, as media from all over the world contacted its reporters for information. The paper's staff put on a disaster-coverage workshop at the CMA/ACP convention in Washington, D.C. The newspaper's website was launched on the same day as the bombing. A Daily columnist and four friends of Middle Eastern descent put up the site so people in the Middle East could find out about the bombing. Their relatives wanted information because popular thought in the U.S. was that the bomber(s) were from the Middle East.

In 1997, the newsroom was moved into its current location inside Copeland Hall where the backshop used to be. The Daily's former newsroom, although once occupied by Sooner Yearbook, remains empty today. Also in 1997, the paper switched to a yearlong editor-in-chief.

The Daily dropped the Associated Press wire service for a year in 2002 after a contract dispute. Service resumed in 2003 after the AP began charging an educational rate to all colleges and universities.

In 2006, The Daily's website merged with the Sooner Information Network (SIN) and formed a student portal, the HUB. The thought behind that move was to make a hub of all campus information for students.

In the summer of 2008, the HUB was redesigned as OUDaily.com.

Distribution is free at more than 40 locations on or near campus for eight themed issues produced throughout the year.

The Daily is overseen by the OU Publications Board, composed of 12 voting members, representing each of the following areas: president's office staff, president's student appointee, the journalism college, the faculty senate, the staff senate, the student government, The Daily staff, Student Media and the Oklahoma Press Association and an alumni representative. The board elects the editor-in-chief for the fall-spring term and the summer term.

== Achievements and critical reception ==
The Daily has won the Associated Collegiate Press' Pacemaker Award – considered by some to be the Pulitzer Prize of college journalism – five times, in 1989, 1994, 1995, 2004 and 2011. In 1993–94, The Daily was lauded for its investigative journalism that uncovered administrators' acceptance of gifts from university vendors and the university's subsequent attempts to conceal the improprieties from the public. The stories and the attention they garnered off campus helped precipitate the resignation of university president Richard Van Horn. In 1995, the newspaper aggressively and poignantly covered the bombing of the Alfred P. Murrah Federal Building in nearby Oklahoma City. The Daily's website, OUDaily.com – rushed from concept to reality that year – became a national resource for news about the bombing, years before most news organizations were even online.

The Daily receives many phone calls of complaints from citizens on a daily basis around Norman and across the state of Oklahoma because of confusion of the similarity in name to the newspaper The Oklahoman formerly called The Daily Oklahoman.

In June 2009, The Daily exclusively announced that Republican Dan Arnett was going to challenge Congressman Dan Boren in 2010 before any other publication in the state.

In October 2022, The Daily was recorded as having 284,236 total social media shares, the 5th highest in the U.S. The publication also had an average of 119 shares per article published, the 8th highest in the U.S. for most consistent engagement per article.

== 2008 redesign ==
Beginning in fall 2008, The Daily reinvented its online presence by moving away from the now defunct hub.ou.edu to the newly formed OUDaily.com.

On September 29, 2008, the printed version of The Oklahoma Daily premiered its redesigned front page. As a part of the redesign, side bars were inserted, allowing for brief news stories to be featured in an easily seen format. Since that time, The Daily has changed its look on several occasions, reducing the dimensions and enhancing readability.
