= Top of the Mark (horse) =

- Breed: American Saddlebred
- Discipline: Five-gaited
- Sire: Top Spool
- Sex: Stallion
- Color: Chestnut
- Breeder: Jeff and Mary Gaylord McClean
- Owner: Jeff and Mary Gaylord McClean
- Trainer: Tre Lee

Major wins
- Five-Gaited World's Grand Championship in 2016, 2017

Honors
- Horse of Honor in 2016

Top of the Mark is an American Saddlebred horse who won the Five-Gaited World's Grand Championship in 2016 and 2017. He was named a Horse of Honor by the United States Equestrian Federation in 2016.

== Life and career ==
Top of the Mark is a dark chestnut stallion sired by Top Spool and out of the mare Carol Lynn. His original registered name with the American Saddlebred Horse Association was Lynn's Top Dollar, but it was changed before he won any major horse shows. He was bred by Jeff and Mary Gaylord McClean, and foaled on their Golden Creek Farm at Simpsonville, Kentucky. Top of the Mark is trained by Tre Lee of Versailles, Kentucky. In 2015 Top of the Mark won the Five-Gaited Stallion Stake in the Lexington Junior League Horse Show. In 2016 Lee again entered him in the Lexington Junior League Horse Show, where he won the Five-Gaited Grand Championship. Lee and Top of the Mark competed in the 2016 World's Championship Horse Show and won the Five-Gaited Stallion World's Championship early in the show before winning the Five-Gaited World's Grand Championship on the show's final night. The United States Equestrian Federation named Top of the Mark a Horse of Honor for 2016. Top of the Mark and Lee repeated their World's Grand Championship in 2017.
