= Mary Gaylord McClean =

American horse breeder, horse owner and exhibitor, businesswoman and philanthropist

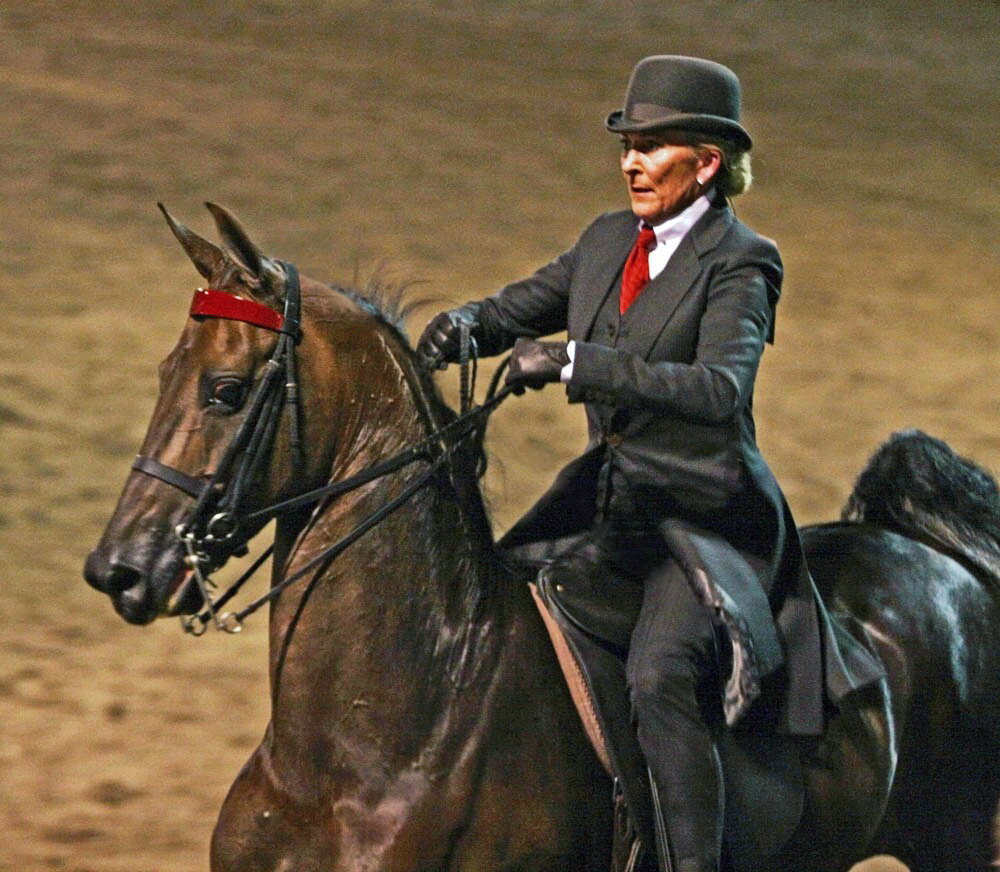
- Mary Gaylord McClean in the World's Championship Horse Show
- Birth name: Mary Gaylord
- Occupation: Publisher, horse breeder/exhibitor
- Discipline: Saddle seat, fine harness
- Born: 1950/1951
- Major wins/Championships: Amateur Five-Gaited World's Championship in 1999; Reserve Five-Gaited World's Grand Championship in 2008; Three-Gaited Ladies Championship in 2010–14; Five-Gaited Ladies Championship in 2014; Five-Gaited World's Grand Championship in 2015

Honors
- Lurline Roth Sportsmanship Award in 1990; USA Equestrian Bill Robinson Trophy in 2002; Inducted into KY State Fair Hall of Fame in 2003; ASHA Breeder of the Year in 2009; Inducted into American Road Horse and Pony Association Hall of Fame in 2010; Inducted into ASHA Breeder Hall of Fame in 2017

Significant horses
- Top Spool, According to Lynn, Mr. Center Stage, Lynn Williams, Top of the Mark

Mary Gaylord McClean (born 1950/51) is an American horse breeder, horse owner and exhibitor, businesswoman and philanthropist. McClean owns and shows American Saddlebred horses and Hackney ponies, on which she has won multiple Championships. Many of her philanthropic ventures are horse-related.

== Life ==
McClean was born Mary Gaylord in 1950/1951. She has a sister, Louise G. Bennett; her father, Edward L. Gaylord, died in 2003. She was married to Jeff McClean for many years, but have since divorced. She has a degree in art history from Boston University. She is chief executive officer and president of Contemporary Signed Books and executive officer of Oklahoma Publishing Company. She lives in Simpsonville, Kentucky.

== Horses and equine philanthropy ==
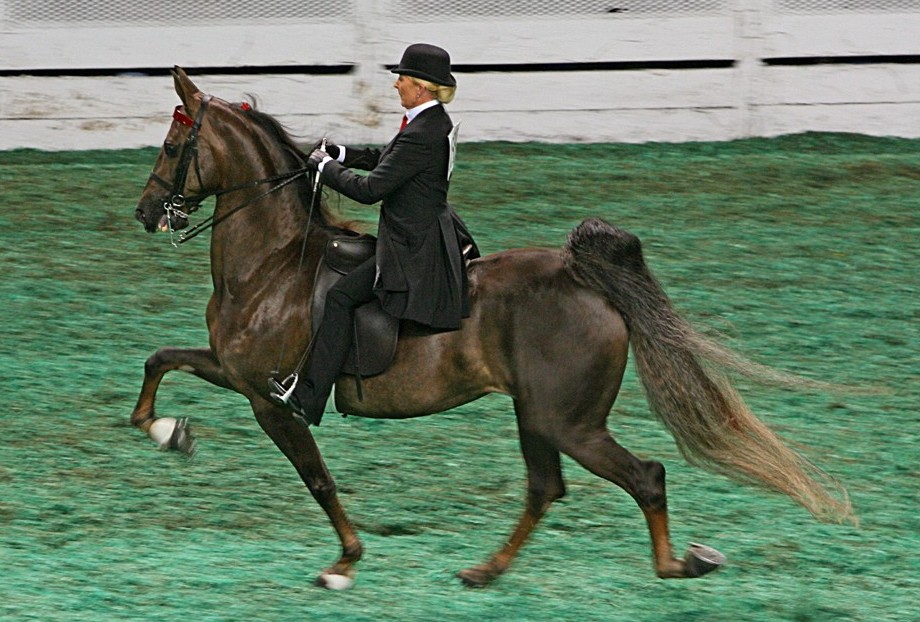
Mary Gaylord McClean and her Saddlebred mare According to Lynn.

McClean is highly involved in the American Saddlebred show horse industry; she and her husband own Golden Creek Farm, where they breed, train and sell horses. At the age of 10 she began taking lessons from Helen Crabtree of Simpsonville, Kentucky, and continued at the Crabtree barn until the age of 16. She received the Lurline Roth Sportsmanship Award in 1990. She competed in the 1999 World's Championship Horse Show at the Kentucky State Fair on the stallion Top Spool and won the Amateur Five-Gaited World's Championship. In 2002 she received the USA Equestrian Bill Robinson Trophy, the same year she received the Sallie B. Wheeler Distinguished Service Award from the United Professional Horsemens Association for her contributions to the show horse industry. The next year, 2003, she was inducted into the Kentucky State Fair Hall of Fame. In 2008 she and the mare According to Lynn placed second in the Five-Gaited World's Grand Championship, making them the reserve winner. She was the American Saddlebred Horse Association's (ASHA) Breeder of the Year in 2009, and the next year was inducted into the American Road Horse and Pony Association Hall of Fame. In 2010 she and the horse Mr. Center Stage entered the Ladies Three-Gaited World's Championship and won. They went on to repeat the next three years. In 2014 McClean also won the Five-Gaited Ladies Championship on the horse Lynn Williams. She owns the stallion Top of the Mark, who won the Five-Gaited World's Grand Championship in 2016, ridden by Tre Lee. Top of the Mark is a son of Top Spool and brother to According to Lynn. In 2015 she won country pleasure and Hackney harness pony classes in the World's Championship Horse Show. McClean also contributes to Saddlebred Rescue, a charity that rescues Saddlebreds, Hackneys, and Morgan horses from slaughter and rehomes them. She contributed to the building of the Shelby County, Kentucky, Fairgrounds. In addition she supports the Marion Therapeutic Riding Association. In 2017 ASHA inducted her into their Breeder Hall of Fame, the same year Top of the Mark and Lee repeated their Five-Gaited World's Grand Championship.
