= Helen Crabtree =

American equestrian

- Birth name: Helen Kitner
- Occupation: Horse trainer, riding teacher, author, horse breeder
- Discipline: Saddle seat
- Born: December 14, 1915; Jacksonville, Illinois
- Died: January 4, 2002 (aged 86); Simpsonville, Kentucky

Honors
- AHSA Lifetime Achievement Award; UPHA Instructor of the Year

Helen Crabtree (December 14, 1915 – January 4, 2002) was an American equitation coach in the discipline of saddle seat riding as well as a breeder and trainer of American Saddlebred horses. In 1970, she authored the book Saddle Seat Equitation which remains a primary guide for equitation riders. Crabtree Stables, which she ran with her husband Charles and son Redd, produced 75 World Champion American Saddlebred horses and 22 winners of the National Equitation Championships.

== Life and career ==
She was born Helen Kitner in Jacksonville, Illinois on December 14, 1915 and began riding by the age of four. By the age of seven she was showing horses for other people and by age 11 she was training horses for a dollar a day. She attended MacMurray College to become a schoolteacher and later became a riding instructor. She met Charles Crabtree at Missouri Stables, where she taught riding lessons. The couple married after a two-year engagement. They trained horses at Clayton Riding and Hunt Club in St. Louis, Missouri, before moving to Arkansas, then Tennessee and ultimately to Kentucky. They trained at the Rock Creek Riding Club in Louisville for several years. The Crabtrees bought their own farm, Crabtree Stables, located near Simpsonville, Kentucky, in 1958.

While in Arkansas, they adopted their son, Redd, a horse-loving boy from a nearby orphanage. Helen Crabtree became a notable equitation coach and taught many young girls to ride, including Mary Gaylord McClean. Crabtree preferred to teach children in groups, pairing less skilled riders with more talented ones, and did not allow longe line riding. In 1970 she wrote the book Saddle Seat Equitation, which she revised in 1982, and was re-released in paperback in 1999. Helen Crabtree received the Lifetime Achievement Award from the American Horse Shows Association (now the United States Equestrian Federation) and was also the United Professional Horsemen's Association Instructor of the Year.

Helen Crabtree died January 4, 2002. She was 86 years old. At her death, it was said that she helped make Shelby County, Kentucky the "Saddle Horse Capital" of the United States and "changed the face of the Saddlebred industry."
