= Gaylord College of Journalism and Mass Communication =

Coordinates: 35.204447°N 97.445363°W

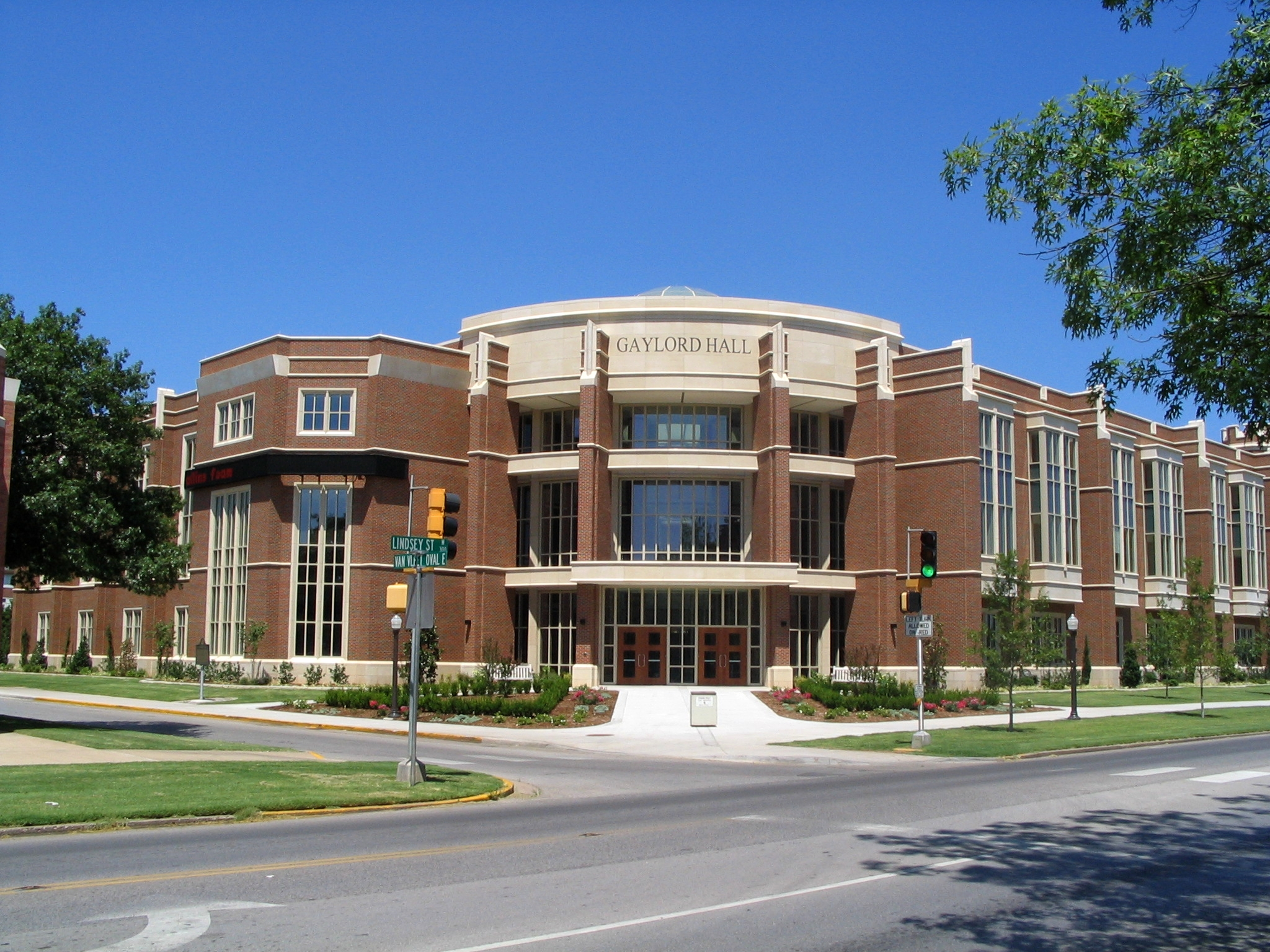
- Type: Public
- Established: 1913
- Parent institution: University of Oklahoma
- Undergraduates: 1,208 (Fall '09)
- Postgraduates: 81 (Fall '09)
- Location: Norman, Oklahoma, USA
- Website: www.ou.edu/gaylord

The Gaylord College of Journalism and Mass Communication is the journalism unit of the University of Oklahoma in Norman. The college is named for the former longtime publishers of The Oklahoman.

== History ==
In 1897, five years after the University of Oklahoma opened its doors, the first student run newspaper, The Umpire, made its debut. In 1903 it became a semiweekly news publication called the University Oklahoman. Subsequently, by 1916 the paper had taken on the name that it still carries today, The Oklahoma Daily.

Sensing the need for professional training, some of The Umpire staff asked for a class in newspaper fundamentals. This first journalism course was placed within the English department as a one-semester two-credit course entitled English 33. Jerome Dowd, a Sociology/Economics professor, and Theodore Brewer, head of the English Department, taught it. Since both had worked in the newspaper business before becoming professors, Dowd as an editor and Brewer as a staff member, they were well able to teach the first class of eight students. By 1910, Mr. Brewer had become the only teacher.

By 1912, as demand for more classes grew, Professor Brewer realized the need for a complete school of journalism. This need was also recognized by then OU President Stratton D. Brooks, who applied to the State Board of Education for a separate journalism school.

On May 24, 1913, the Board approved President Brooks' request, and the School of Journalism, located within the College of Arts and Sciences, was born. The school was to officially began in the fall semester on September 1, 1913.

Professor Theodore Brewer was appointed as the first director of the new School of Journalism and, along with Jerome Dowd, became the first two professors.

The first permanent building specifically for journalism was Copeland Hall, built in 1958. It remained in Copeland Hall until the opening of Gaylord Hall in 2004.

Formerly known as the H.H. Herbert School of Journalism and Mass Communication, in 2000 the Gaylord family gave $22 million dollars to the university. As such, the school was elevated to college status, and both the college and facility were renamed for the Gaylord family in return. The Gaylord Family is the former longtime publishers of The Oklahoman which sold in 2011.

Designed by Oklahoma City-based architecture firm Rees Associates, Inc., the 107,850-square-foot (10,020 m^{2}) facility was completed in two phases and anchors the University of Oklahoma's South Oval. Exterior architecture draws from the Cherokee Gothic vernacular prevalent on the historic Norman campus’ academic core, yet sleek glass and a large outdoor news ticker meld traditionalism with more modern elements and convey the facility's purpose.

The college's new facility includes multimedia computer labs, classrooms, lecture halls, a library, broadcast production and technical facilities, sound stage, auditorium, and faculty offices. These functions support the various education sequences such as professional writing, journalism, public relations, broadcast, production and advertising, and reflect the trend of media convergence prevalent in today's communications industries.

Additionally, the Phase II expansion completed in 2009 added a unique feature: a public relations and advertising agency called Lindsey + Asp, where students can experience the industries they are studying first-hand with real clients. This area includes computer labs and offices, as well as presentation and conference rooms for collaborative efforts. The expansion is also home to additional classrooms and dedicated graduate offices and workrooms.

The two-phase design embraces an exterior courtyard which serves as a gathering area for alumni and multimedia events. Commons Areas and a Hall of Fame offer interior event venues, and a roof terrace provides views of the courtyard during outdoor events.

== Historical facts ==
- The Gaylord College of Journalism and Mass Communication is one of the largest colleges at the University of Oklahoma.
- Achieved college status in July 2000 after 85 years with a $22 million gift from the Gaylord family
- Founding member of the Accrediting Council for Education in Journalism and Mass Communication (ACEJMC)
- Home of the Native American Journalists Association (NAJA)
- Accredited by the Association of Schools of Journalism and Mass Communications (ASJMC)
- Gaylord Hall is the headquarters for the Oklahoma Scholastic Media/OIPA, the oldest continuing secondary school press organization in the world.
- Home of Lindsey+Asp, the only student-run advertising and public relations agency with a whole wing of the journalism facility dedicated to it.

== Curriculum ==
The new curriculum consisted of 24 hours of journalism and ten weeks of fieldwork at a newspaper. Classes included newspaper work fundamentals, organization of the city room, and the duties of the reporter. In 1915, the first two graduates received a minor in Journalism and a Certificate of completion.

Over the past 90 years, many new classes were added and students now have a wide variety to choose from.

=== Academic programs ===
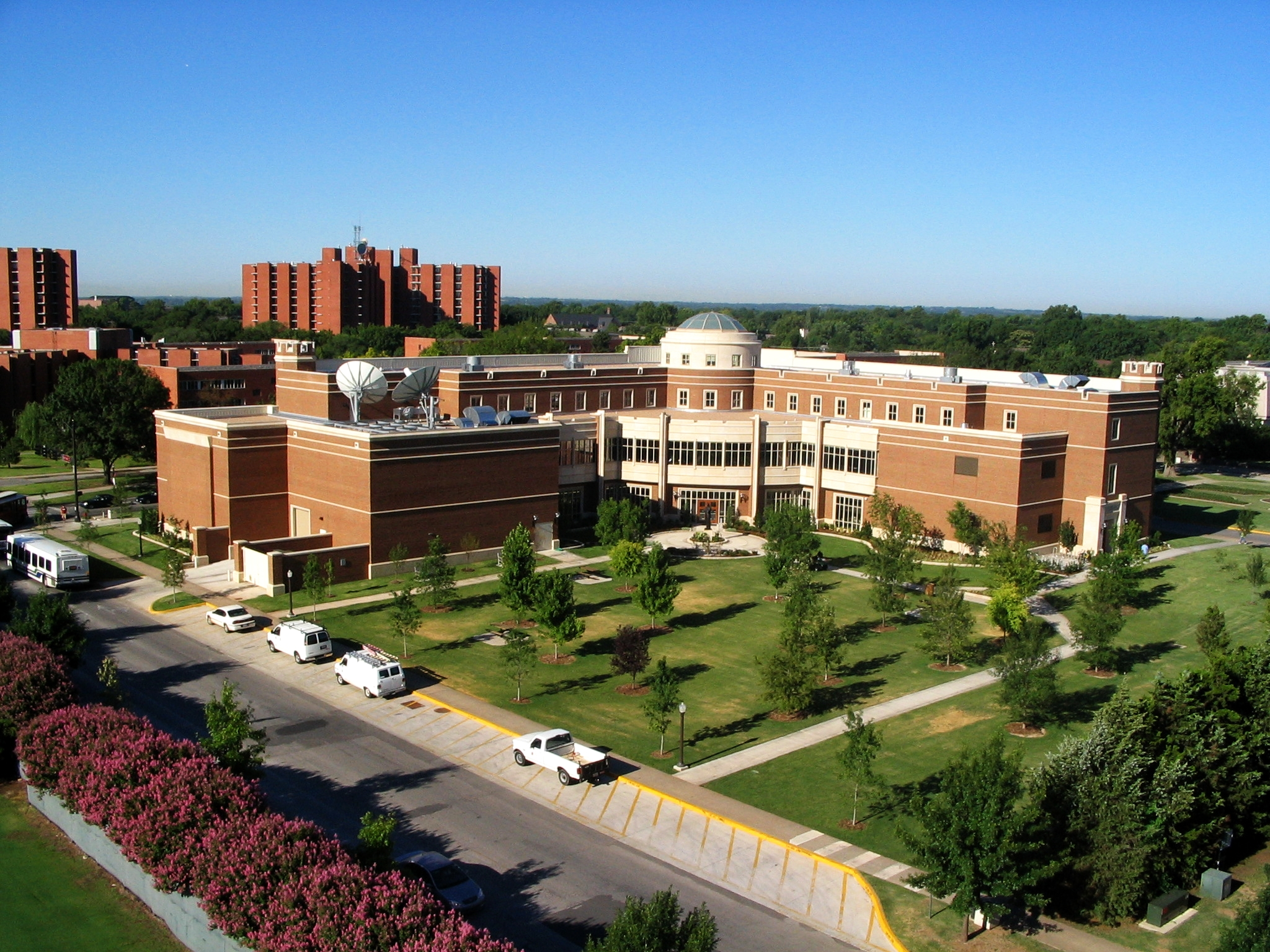
The back of Gaylord Hall.

Degree tracks include:

- Advertising
- Creative Media Production
- Journalism
- Professional Writing
- Public Relations

=== Student media ===
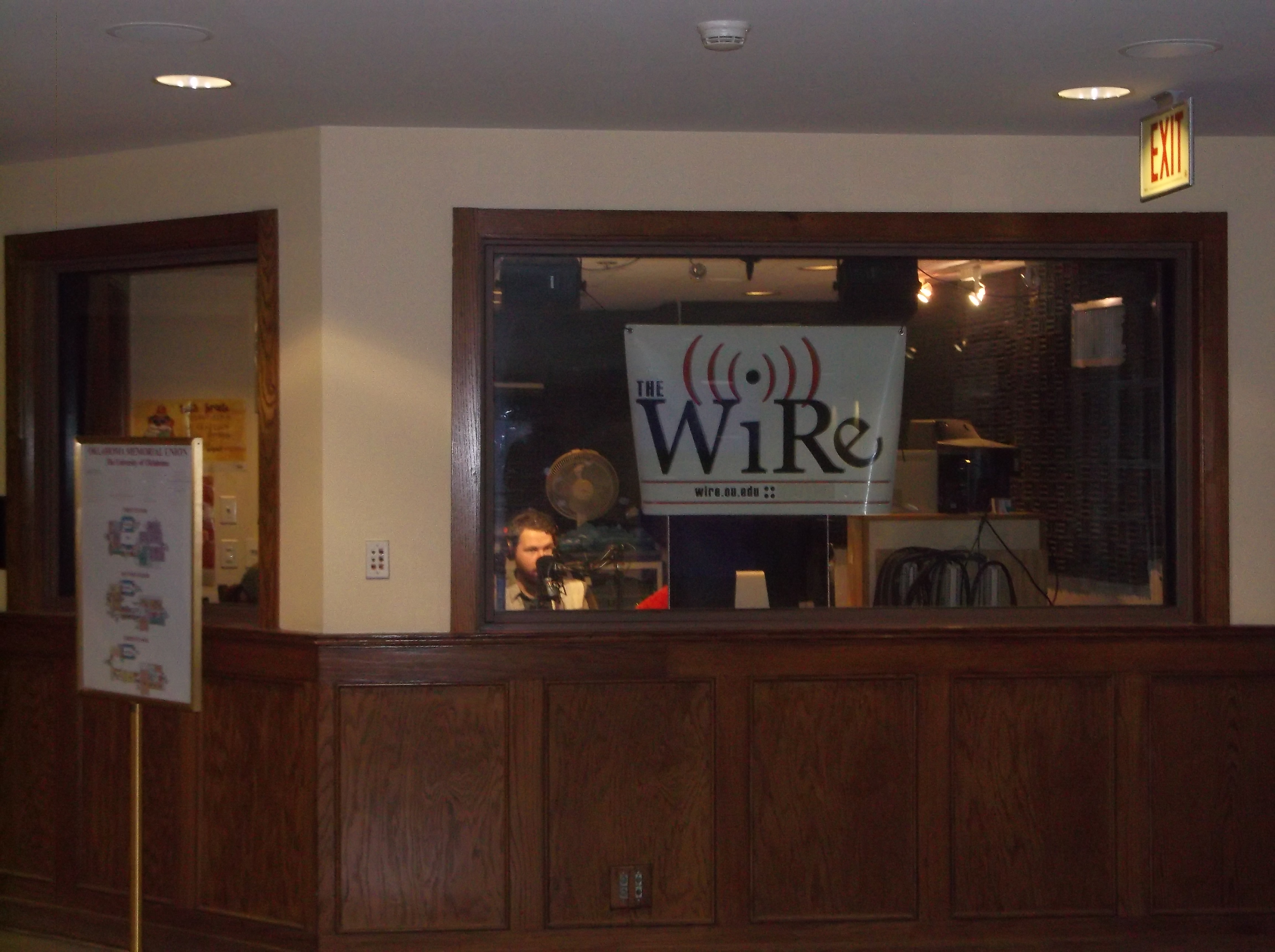
Radio broadcaster booth at the University of Oklahoma student union

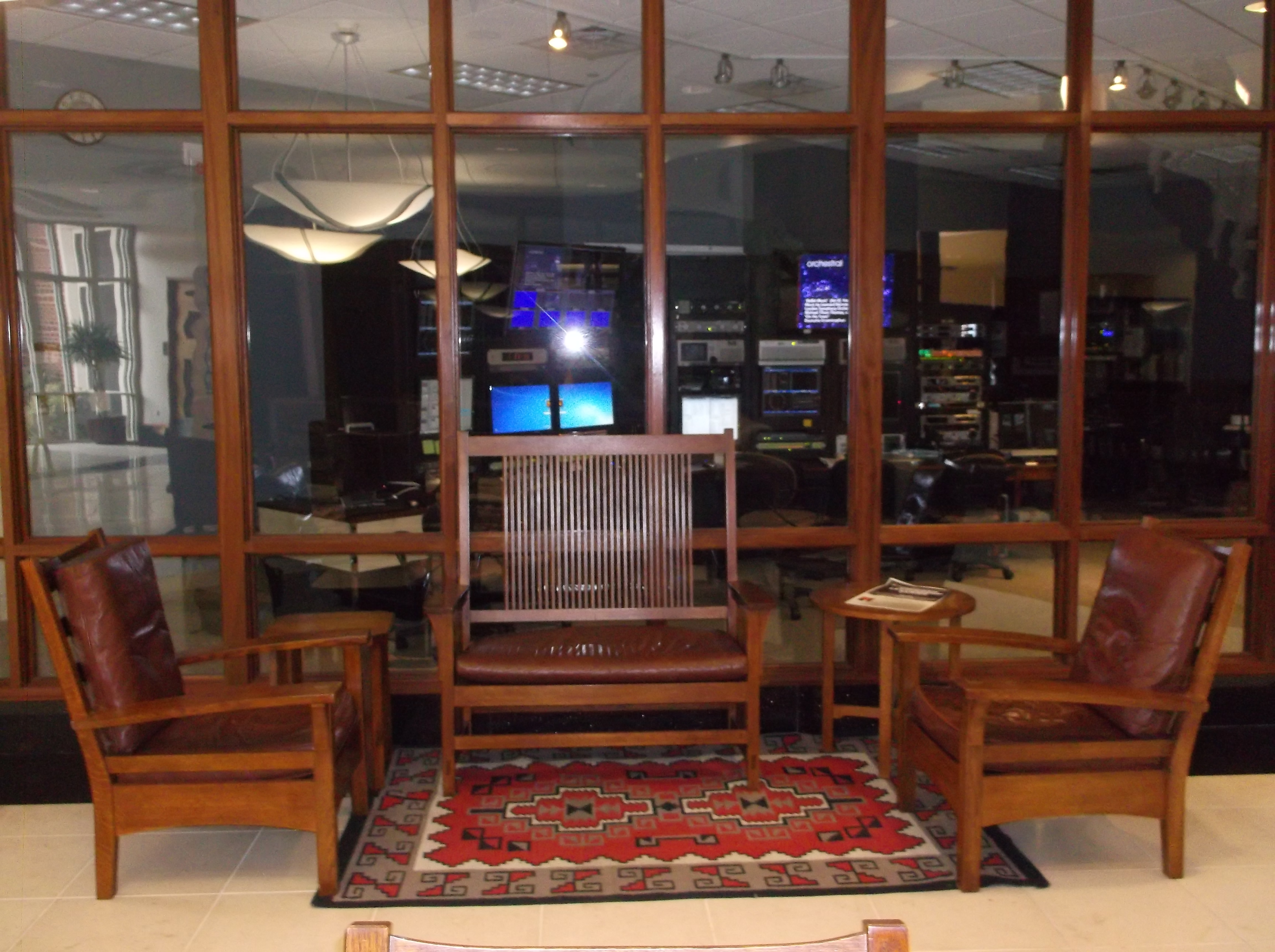
Broadcast studio in Gaylord College of Journalism at OU

Students are able to participate in hands-on media training:

- The campus TV station, OUTV, features student produced programming five nights a week and is available on local cable (COX channel 124, uVerse 99/Oklahoma City & Tulsa, Campus Channel 76, and ou.edu/tv). Regularly scheduled shows include a live, daily newscast "OU Nightly" (5 days per week during fall and spring semesters, this show is also seen on Cox 3 across Oklahoma), "The Set", a local and regional band show shot live with recordings distributed over cable and web streams and via youtube.com/outheset, "Game Day U", a live pregame show, "Sooner Sports Pad", a sports-oriented show produced in conjunction with SoonerVision and airing on Fox Sports Networks, along with other documentary, multi-camera, comedy, talk, and game shows.
- The campus student radio station, StudioU (formerly the WIRE and, briefly, KXOU), webcasts on TuneIn in a freeform format and is staffed by student hosts, who coordinate a diverse number of radio show styles, including talk, sports, pop, metal, hip-hop, electronica, and rock. The station is home to OU Hockey, which is simulcast on OUTV. When there is no live DJ, the station runs on automation software. As of September 2009, the station's library had 5,982 songs and added about 120 songs per week. The station received an FCC construction permit with plans to broadcast at low power on 95.5 FM by 2018, but the permit expired before any progress was made. Current students manage the station with guidance and oversight from graduate students and a faculty advisor.
- The campus newspaper, The Oklahoma Daily, is an independently run entity, and is produced by a student staff of editors, reporters, photographers, designers and other personnel. The paper was produced daily during the fall and spring semesters and weekly during the summer semester up until the spring of 2016 when it became a twice weekly publication.

[6]

== Experiential Learning Opportunities ==
The Gaylord College specializes in experiential learning opportunities in order to prepare its students for their future careers in journalism and mass communications. Its innovative teaching style allows students the opportunity to experience the technology, brainstorming, implementation and evaluation practices they will need. Because Gaylord prepares students to this extent, the students are often first pick for many employers.

Some of the program opportunities Gaylord offers its students are OU Nightly (ounightly.com), Routes (routes.ou.edu), Lindsey+Asp (lindseyandasp.com), The Set (youtube.com/outheset), and SoonerVision (soonersports.com).

== Administration and faculty ==
- Dean, Andrea Miller
- Assistant Dean of Student Affairs & Administration, Desiree Hill
- Associate Dean of Academic Affairs & Graduate Studies, Elanie Steyn
- Founding Dean, Charles C. Self

The college has several endowed positions, including: Joe Foote (Gaylord Chair), Glenn Leshner (Edward L. Gaylord Endowed Chair), Jeong-Nam Kim (Gaylord Family Endowed Chair), Meta Carstarphen (Gaylord Family Endowed Professor), Peter Gade (Gaylord Family Endowed Professor), 24 tenure-track faculty, 7 full professors, 5 associate professors, 12 assistant professors, 21 practitioner and visiting professors, 13 part-time adjunct professors, 8 full-time visiting professors
