= Aberdeen, Arkansas =

- Populated place
- Location within Arkansas Location within the United States
- Coordinates: 34°36′12″N 91°20′30″W
- Country: United States
- State: Arkansas
- County: Monroe
- Elevation: 200 ft (61 m)
- Time zone: UTC-6 (Central (CST))
  - Summer (DST): UTC-5 (CDT)
- ZIP code: 72134
- Area code: 870
- FIPS code: 05/00160
- GNIS feature ID: 45773

Aberdeen is a populated place in Monroe County, Arkansas, United States. The nearest communities are Roe also in Monroe County, approximately 3 miles (4.8 km) to the northwest, Casscoe in Arkansas County approximately 5 miles (8.0 km) to the southeast and Preston Ferry in Arkansas County, approximately 5 miles (8.0 km) to the south.

== Geography ==
Aberdeen is located off Arkansas Highway 366, approximately .85 miles (1.37 km) due east of the White River.

== Demographics ==
As of the census of 2014, there were 107 people residing within 5 miles (8.0 km) radius of Aberdeen. This is a 6.14% decrease since the census of 2010.

== Climate ==
The closest town for which climate data is available is Roe, Arkansas. The climate in this area is characterized by hot, humid summers and generally mild to cool winters. According to the Köppen Climate Classification system, this locale has a humid subtropical climate, abbreviated "Cfa" on climate maps.
