= Edith Kinney Gaylord =

American journalist and philanthropist

- Born: March 5, 1916; Oklahoma City, Oklahoma
- Died: January 28, 2001 (aged 84)
- Education: Wells College
- Occupation: Journalist
- Known for: Philanthropy; Founder of Inasmuch Foundation

Edith Kinney Gaylord (March 5, 1916 – January 28, 2001), also referred to as Edith Gaylord Harper, was an American journalist and philanthropist.

== Early life ==
She was born in Oklahoma City, Oklahoma, on March 5, 1916, to parents Inez and E. K. Gaylord. Her father was editor and publisher of The Oklahoman and The Oklahoma City Times. She spent two semesters in private school in Switzerland, then returned to Oklahoma City to attend public schools and graduated from Classen High School. She briefly attended Colorado College in Colorado Springs before graduating from Wells College in Aurora, New York, in 1939 with a Bachelor of Arts degree.

== Career ==
Gaylord began her journalistic career reporting for her father's newspaper and radio station in Oklahoma City. In the summer of 1942, she was hired by the Associated Press in New York and was transferred five months later to their Washington, D.C., bureau. She was the first female employee on the general news staff.

While working for the AP in 1943, Gaylord followed Madame Chiang Kai-Shek, the First Lady of China, on her tour of the United States. In 1944, Eleanor Roosevelt was the first U.S. First Lady to call her own press conference. She insisted that any journalist covering the next conference be a woman. The AP assigned Gaylord to the task. Gaylord was elected president of the Women's National Press Club in 1944. While in that role, Gaylord served as Mrs. Roosevelt's media liaison and then secretary of Roosevelt's Press Conference Association.

Gaylord returned to Oklahoma City after the end of World War II, but rejoined the Associated Press in the early 1950s, covering the 1953 coronation of Queen Elizabeth II in London and other major events. She came back to the family business in 1963. Gaylord served as a member of the board of directors and corporate secretary for the Oklahoma Publishing Company.

== Philanthropy ==
Gaylord quietly began her philanthropy efforts in the 1960s, often donating anonymously to those in need. In 1982 she founded both Inasmuch Foundation and Ethics and Excellence in Journalism Foundation to carry out her giving. In 2014, the corporate entities merged and EEJF became a wholly owned subsidiary of Inasmuch Foundation.

Gaylord became a charter trustee at Colorado College in Colorado Springs and was awarded an honorary Doctor of Humane Letters degree from the college in 1992. The University of Oklahoma also presented Gaylord with an honorary Doctor of Humane Letters degree in 1997 for her contributions.

== Legacy ==
Gaylord died on January 28, 2001, at St. Anthony's Hospital in Oklahoma City, the same hospital where she had been born 84 years earlier.

Universities in several states have honored the memory of Gaylord by naming new academic centers or professorships for her.

- University of Oklahoma, Gaylord College: Edith Kinney Gaylord Library
- Oklahoma City University, Ann Lacy School of American Dance and Arts Management: Edith Kinney Gaylord Center
- Arizona State University, Cronkite School of Journalism: Edith Kinney Gaylord Visiting Professorship in Journalism Ethics
- University of Maryland, College Park, Knight Hall for Journalism: Edith Kinney Gaylord Library and Resource Center
- Colorado College: Edith Kinney Gaylord Cornerstone Arts Center and Edith Gaylord House

== Family ==
Edith's father E.K. Gaylord was editor and publisher of The Oklahoman and The Oklahoma City Times.

Edith's brother Edward Gaylord inherited controlling interest of The Oklahoman in 1974. He also purchased the Grand Ole Opry in Nashville, Tennessee and created the cable television channels The Nashville Network (TNN) and Country Music Television (CMT).

Edith's niece Christy Gaylord Everest served as Chairman and Chief Executive Officer of Oklahoma Publishing Company from 2003 to 2011.
