= Edward Gaylord =

American billionaire businessman, media mogul and philanthropist

- Born: Edward Lewis Gaylord; May 28, 1919; Oklahoma City, Oklahoma, United States
- Died: April 27, 2003 (aged 83); Oklahoma City, Oklahoma, United States
- Parent: Edward K. Gaylord

Edward Lewis Gaylord (May 28, 1919 – April 27, 2003) was an American billionaire businessman, media mogul and philanthropist. He was the founder of the Gaylord Entertainment Company that included The Oklahoman newspaper, Oklahoma Publishing Co., Gaylord Hotels, the Nashville Network TV Channel (later renamed SpikeTV, Spike, and Paramount Network after being sold off); the Grand Ole Opry, and the Country Music Television Channel (CMT) as well as the defunct Opryland USA theme park and a bankrupt airline, Western Pacific Airlines.

== Early life ==
Gaylord was born on May 28, 1919, in Oklahoma City, Oklahoma. His father, Edward King Gaylord, was the owner of The Daily Oklahoman.

Gaylord graduated from Stanford University in 1941, where he earned a degree in business. He attended the Harvard Business School and served in the United States Army during World War II.

== Career ==
Gaylord began his career for Oklahoma Publishing in 1946. He inherited a controlling interest in The Daily Oklahoman upon his father's death in 1974. He purchased the Grand Ole Opry in Nashville, Tennessee, when it was in dire financial straits and kept it operating. He created The Nashville Network TV Channel, as well as Country Music Television, or CMT, which is similar to MTV, and owned Hee Haw, a long-running country and western variety show. He was also an investor in Texas Rangers at the same time as George W. Bush. Gaylord served as the chairman of the Gaylord Entertainment Company until February 2003.

Gaylord was the president of the Southern Newspaper Publishers Association. He also served on the board of directors of the American Newspaper Publishers Association. As the publisher of The Oklahoman, he consistently took conservative political positions in opposition to government spending, but at the same time the paper was sometimes accused of improperly dealing with conflicts of interests created by Gaylord's personal financial interests. One example was the paper's editorial support for the city to use public funds to promote the building of a new Bass Pro Shop in Oklahoma City, while Gaylord Entertainment was then a 19.9% shareholder of Bass Pro stock. The Oklahoman's reporting on this topic again drew criticism from the Columbia Journalism Review. Gaylord also was a member of the conservative public policy think tank, Council for National Policy.

== Philanthropy ==
The Gaylord family of Oklahoma City helped found the National Cowboy & Western Heritage Museum in Oklahoma City and has given the University of Oklahoma contributions totaling over $50 million in the last three decades, and founded the Gaylord College of Journalism and Mass Communication. The home field of the University of Oklahoma Sooners football team was renamed Gaylord Family Oklahoma Memorial Stadium due to their contributions.

== Personal life, death and legacy ==
Gaylord had two sisters, Virginia and Edith Kinney Gaylord, and several children, including Edward King Gaylord II, Mary Gaylord McClean, Louise Gaylord Bennett and Christy Gaylord Everest.

He married Italian actress Anna Maria Sandri in 1956.

Gaylord died of cancer on April 27, 2003, in Oklahoma City, Oklahoma. His funeral was held at the National Cowboy & Western Heritage Museum.

The Daily Oklahoman remained under the Gaylord family's control until the sale in 2011; the news features and editorial position of the paper reflect affiliation with The Washington Examiner, which has the same owner. Edward L. Gaylord's daughters Christy Gaylord Everest and Louise Gaylord Bennett remain as board members. Both sought an updated look for the paper and seemed to present more frequent opposing viewpoints on issues of public concern.

The company that bore the family name, Gaylord Entertainment Company, transitioned into a real estate investment trust in 2012. As part of a long-term contract giving Marriott International the rights to manage its hotels and adjacent attractions, the company was renamed Ryman Hospitality Properties. The Gaylord name transferred to Marriott, and now exists as a brand known as Gaylord Hotels, though RHP continues to own the physical properties.

== Awards and honors ==
- 1974 – Oklahoma Hall of Fame
