= Inasmuch Foundation =

Non-profit organization in Oklahoma, United States

- Formation: 1982
- Founder: Edith Kinney Gaylord
- Services: Grant-making foundation
- Website: www.inasmuchfoundation.org

Inasmuch Foundation is a grant-making foundation based in Oklahoma City, Oklahoma, United States. The foundation provides financial contributions within the community and civic engagement, education, human services, and journalism fields.

Grant-making within community and civic engagement, education, and human services is specific to nonprofit organizations serving Oklahoma City. Grants within the journalism focus area are open to organizations nationwide. The organization administers an open request cycle each fall and spring, as well as an invitation-only grant cycle in the summer.

== History ==
Inasmuch Foundation was founded in1 1982 by Edith Kinney Gaylord. The foundation takes its name from the Gospel of Saint Matthew, "Inasmuch as ye have done it unto one of the least of these, my brethren, ye have done it unto me."

In 2014, the Ethics and Excellence in Journalism Foundation, also established by Edith Kinney Gaylord in 1982, merged with the Inasmuch Foundation and became a wholly owned subsidiary. The transition was completed in 2020 with the launch of a new, consolidated brand and website.

In 2023, Inasmuch Foundation reached more than $350 million in grants, an amount that surpasses founder Edith Kinney Gaylord’s original contributions to Inasmuch Foundation. That same year, Inasmuch released a 40th Anniversary Report detailing the organization's past, present, and future.

As of 2023, Inasmuch Foundation provides an average of $25 million plus in grants per fiscal year. Additionally, the endowment has grown to a current value of more than $550 million.

Robert J. Ross has served as President of Inasmuch Foundation since 2005 and was elected Chairman in 2019. He originally joined the Inasmuch team in 2003 as Executive Director and Vice President of the Board.

== Grant recipients ==
Since its founding in 1982, Inasmuch Foundation has supported more than 250 nonprofit organizations. Grant recipients have included:

- City Care
- Homeless Alliance
- Lyric Theater
- Myriad Botanical Gardens
- Oklahoma City Museum of Art
- Oklahoma City National Memorial & Museum
- Oklahoma Media Center
- Oklahoma City Zoo & Botanical Garden (Oklahoma Zoological Society)
- Positive Tomorrows
- Regional Food Bank of Oklahoma
- ReMerge of Oklahoma County
- Sunbeam Family Services
- United Way of Central Oklahoma
- University of Oklahoma
  - Gaylord College of Journalism & Mass Communication
- Upward Transitions

== Notable contributions ==
Inasmuch Foundation promotes itself as a leader in public/private partnerships and collaborative problem-solving. Some of Inasmuch Foundation’s notable projects include…

- The Ecosystem Engagement Fund is a multiphase study conducted by Oklahoma Media Center (OMC) and funded by Kirkpatrick Foundation in Oklahoma City. In the first two stages, OMC conducted scientific polling to identify how Oklahomans consume news and performed academic field research to gather input from rural news deserts and underserved communities. After gathering and analyzing this information, OMC performed newsroom training to interpret key research findings and construct a plan to put the study’s recommendations into practice. In the final phase, Inasmuch Foundation distributed $100,000 in grants to newsrooms who developed programs aimed at implementing what they learned and building trust among readers.
- Key to Home is a large-scale public/private partnership involving over 40 member agencies working together to house and provide wrap around support to Oklahoma City’s chronically unsheltered population. In 2019, Oklahoma City Mayor David Holt convened a Homelessness Task Force co-chaired by Inasmuch Foundation Chairman and CEO, Bob Ross and Arnall Family Foundation President Sue Ann Arnall. Inasmuch Foundation, Arnall Family Foundation and the City of Oklahoma City provided resources to commission research on challenges and solutions as well as development of a comprehensive plan to address the problem, which ultimately resulted in the Key to Home program. Key to Home plans to house 500 of Oklahoma City’s unsheltered population within two years and is funded with a combination of federal grants, municipal allocations, and private support. Key to Home is modeled off a previously successful effort out of Houston, Texas that housed 25,000 of the city’s unsheltered population over ten years.
- Educare Oklahoma City was introduced to Oklahoma City in 2007 thanks to a collaboration among Inasmuch Foundation, Sunbeam Family Services, Community Action Agency, and Oklahoma City Public Schools. Part of the national Educare Learning Network, Educare Oklahoma City is run by Sunbeam Family Services and provides Early Head Start to help prepare young children from birth to age 4 to enter kindergarten with school-readiness skills. Sunbeam also provides wraparound support through its other service areas. Educare Oklahoma City is one of several in the state and the first Educare location in the nation to be certified by Leadership in Energy and Environmental Design
- ReMerge of Oklahoma County was established in 2011 by Inasmuch Foundation and more than 50 community partners. The organization serves mothers of minor children who are facing non-violent felony charges in Oklahoma County. ReMerge has graduated 229 women and impacted 569 children as of January 2026. ReMerge has also saved the state of Oklahoma more than $51 million by providing a pathway for mothers to be restored to our community rather than incarcerated and separated from their children. In 2026, ReMerge opened a $4.5 million graduate center to provide community resources.
