= Ethics and Excellence in Journalism Foundation =

Nonprofit organization in Oklahoma, US

The Ethics and Excellence in Journalism Foundation (EEJF) was a grant-making foundation based in Oklahoma City that provided grants to journalism institutions throughout the United States.

Edith Kinney Gaylord established EEJF and Inasmuch Foundation in 1982 as two separate entities, and in 2014, the corporate entities merged and EEJF became a wholly owned subsidiary of Inasmuch Foundation. The transition was completed in 2020 with the launch of a new, consolidated brand and website.
