= The Oklahoman =

Newspaper in Oklahoma

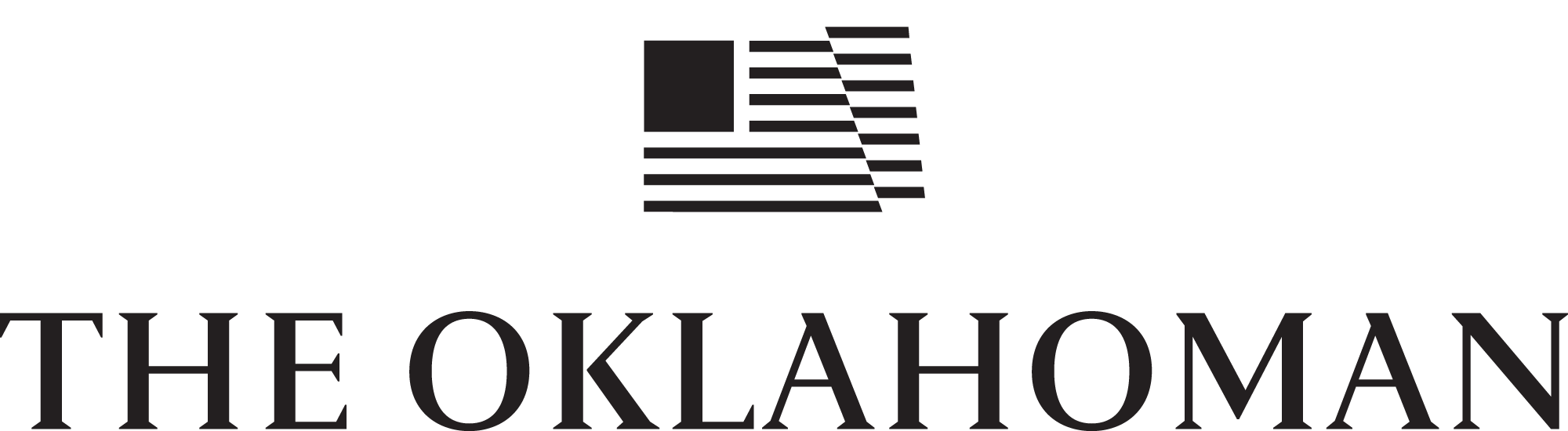
- Type: Daily newspaper
- Format: Broadsheet
- Owner: USA Today Co.
- Editor: Ray Rivera
- Founded: 1889; 137 years ago
- Headquarters: Oklahoma City, Oklahoma
- Circulation: 25,304 daily; 33,047 Sunday; (as of 2022)
- OCLC number: 53300931
- Website: www.oklahoman.com

The Oklahoman is the largest daily newspaper in Oklahoma, United States, and is the only regional daily that covers the Greater Oklahoma City area. The Alliance for Audited Media (formerly Audit Bureau Circulation) lists it as the 59th largest U.S. newspaper in circulation.

The Oklahoman has been published by Gannett (formerly known as GateHouse Media) owned by Fortress Investment Group and its investor Softbank since October 1, 2018. On November 11, 2019, GateHouse Media and Gannett announced GateHouse Media would be acquiring Gannett and taking the Gannett name. The acquisition of Gannett was finalized on November 19, 2019.

Copies are sold for $2 daily or $4 Sundays/Thanksgiving Day; prices are higher outside Oklahoma County and adjacent counties.

== Ownership ==
The Daily Oklahoman newspaper was founded in 1894 by Samuel W. Small. Small eventually lost the paper and it was owned by a bank who leased the paper to Charles F. Barrett. R. Q. Blakeney would also run the paper before it was bought by Roy E. Stafford and W. T. Parker in 1900. The paper was taken over in 1903 by Edward K. Gaylord. Gaylord would run the paper for 71 years, and upon his death, the paper remained under the Gaylord family.

It was announced on September 15, 2011, that all Oklahoma Publishing Company (OPUBCO) assets, including The Oklahoman, would be sold to Denver-based businessman Philip Anschutz and his Anschutz Corporation. The sale of OPUBCO to Philip Anschutz closed in October 2011, and the Oklahoma Publishing Company remained independent in operation. Other Anschutz-owned newspapers include The Gazette of Colorado Springs and the Washington Examiner.

In 2018, Anschutz sold The Oklahoman Media Company portion of OPUBCO to GateHouse Media for $12.5 million. which included The Oklahoman, NewsOK.com, BigWing and The Oklahoman Direct, marking the first time in the newspaper's history that it would be owned by a publicly traded company.

On November 11, 2019, GateHouse Media and Gannett announced GateHouse Media would be acquiring Gannett and taking the Gannett name. The Gannett corporate merger/acquisition closed on November 19, 2019. The November 20, 2019 (Volume 129,323) issue of The Oklahoman was the first to show Gannett as the copyright owner, reflecting the rebranding of GateHouse Media to Gannett.

== Headquarters ==
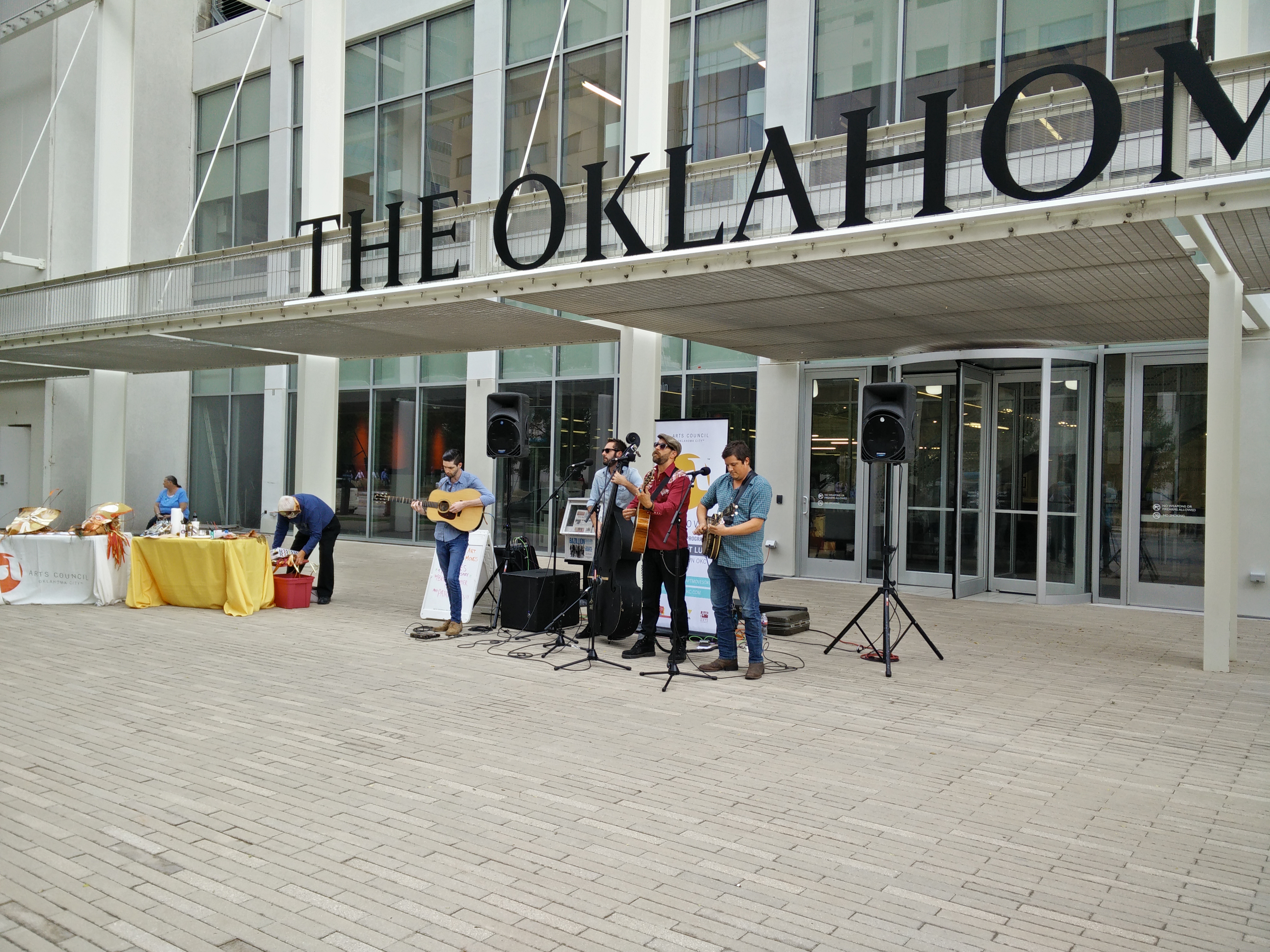
A band plays outside The Oklahoman's Oklahoma City headquarters.

The Oklahoman's offices are located at 210 Park Ave. in the Oklahoma Tower, across the street from the Oklahoma County Courthouse and one block east of City Hall. The newsroom has occupied the space since September 2026.

From 2018 to 2026, The Oklahoman was located at 100 W. Main in the Century Center office building, connected to the Sheraton Hotel, in downtown Oklahoma City. The newsroom moved to a space on the second floor in 2021 after KWTV-DT News9 took over the first floor as Griffin Communications, purchased the building.

The Oklahoma Publishing Company (OPUBCO) which owned The Oklahoman until 2018, was headquartered at N.W. 4th Street and Broadway in downtown Oklahoma City until 1991, when it moved to a 12-story tower at Broadway Extension and Britton Road in the northern part of the city. That building was sold to American Fidelity Assurance in 2012. Office space was then leased back to OPUBCO until plans were finalized for the company to move its headquarters.

After a 23-year absence from downtown Oklahoma City, The Oklahoman staff (and most OPUBCO employees) moved to the office's current location in early 2015. In 2016, printing and production at the facility at Broadway Extension and Britton Road was shifted to The Tulsa World and the Oklahoman facility closed. As part of the closure, 130 employees were laid off, and pre-production and layout services were sourced to the GateHouse Media-owned Center for News and Design in Austin, Texas. The former production plant at Broadway Extension and Britton Road was razed by the site's new owner, American Fidelity Assurance, and as of 2021, new construction and development was taking place in the area.

== History ==
=== Early years ===
Founded in 1889 in Oklahoma City by Sam Small, The Daily Oklahoman was taken over in 1903 by The Oklahoma Publishing Company (OPUBCO), controlled by Edward K. Gaylord, also known as E. K. Gaylord. In 1916, OPUBCO purchased the failing Oklahoma Times and operated it as an evening newspaper for the next 68 years.

In 1928, E. K. Gaylord bought Oklahoma's first radio station, WKY. More than 20 years later, he signed on Oklahoma's first television station, WKY-TV (now KFOR-TV). The two stations would be the anchors of a broadcasting empire that, at its height, included six television stations and five radio stations. Nearly all of the Gaylord broadcasting interests would be sold off by 1996, though The Oklahoman held onto WKY radio until 2002.

E. K. Gaylord died at the age of 101, having controlled the newspaper for the previous 71 years. Management of the newspaper passed to his son, Edward L. Gaylord, who managed the newspaper from 1974 to 2003. Christy Gaylord Everest, daughter of Edward L. Gaylord and granddaughter of E. K. Gaylord, was the company's chairwoman and CEO until 2011. Christy Everest was assisted by her sister Louise Gaylord Bennett until the sale of the company in 2011 to Philip Anschutz.

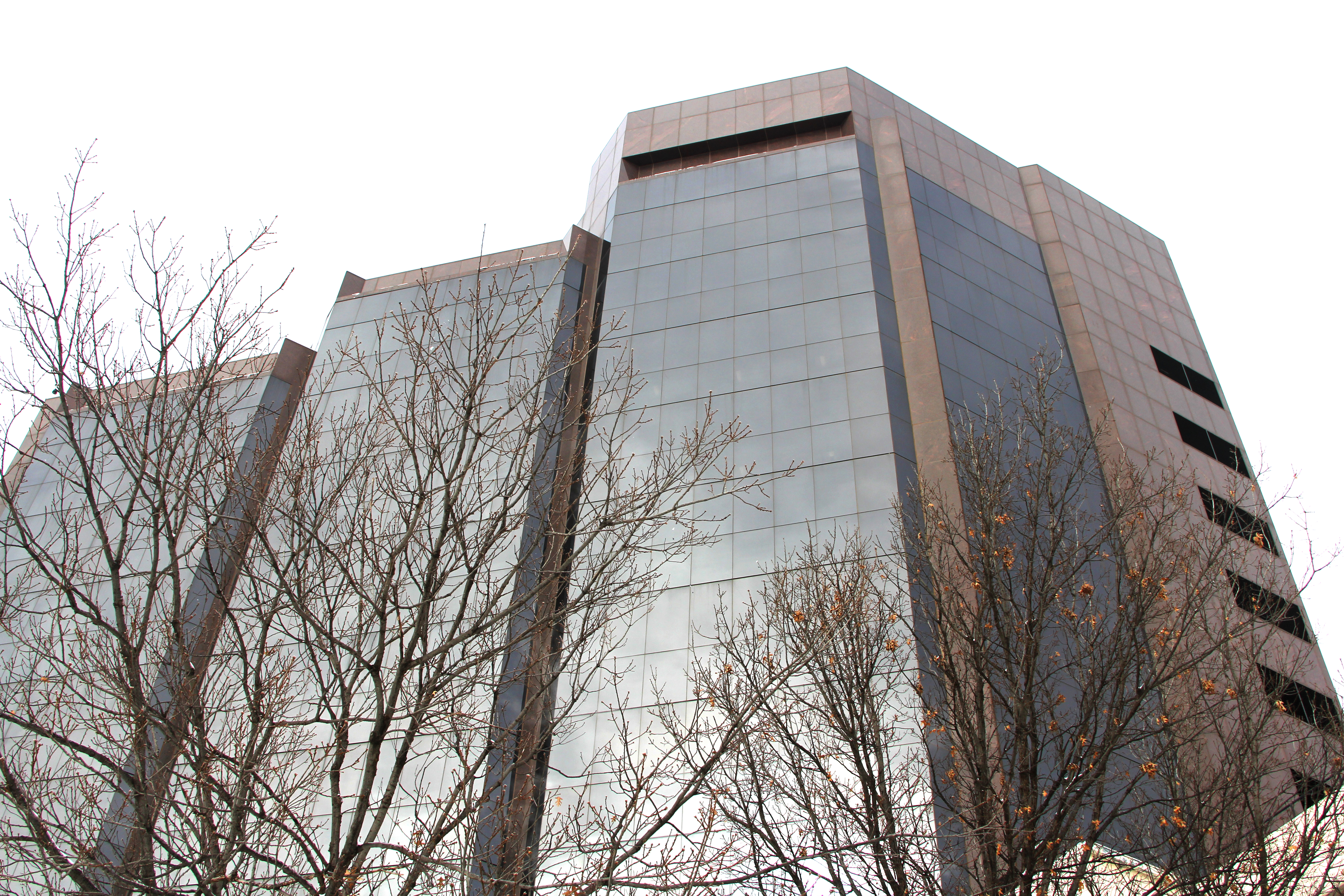
The Oklahoman moved to a 12-story tower at Broadway Extension and Britton Road in the northern part of the city in 1991. The office moved to its current location in Oklahoma City's Century Center in 2015.

=== 2000s to present ===
In October 2003, The Daily Oklahoman was renamed The Oklahoman with OPUBCO and future owner GateHouse Media officially retaining the registered trademarks of The Daily Oklahoman, The Sunday Oklahoman, and The Oklahoma City Times to this day.

In November 2008, The Oklahoman announced that it was reducing its circulation area to cover approximately the western two-thirds of the state, rather than statewide. This shift halted delivery in Tulsa, which reduced the paper's circulation by about 7,000 homes.

In January 2009, The Oklahoman and the Tulsa World announced a content-sharing agreement in which each paper would carry some content created by the other; the papers also said they would "focus on reducing some areas of duplication, such as sending reporters from both The Oklahoman and the World to cover routine news events."

In 2010, The Oklahoman introduced the first iPad app for a newspaper/multimedia company of its size in the United States.

In 2018, publisher Chris Reen was replaced by interim publisher Jim Hopson. Later that year, editor Kelly Dyer Fry was announced to replace Hopson as publisher. She retained her roles as editor and vice president of news. Dyer Fry retired in November 2020, and in 2021, Ray Rivera was named the new executive editor of The Oklahoman. He also oversees Gannett's Sunbelt region, which encompasses some 42 daily and weekly newspapers in Oklahoma, Texas, New Mexico, and Colorado.

In March 2022, The Oklahoman moved to a six-day printing schedule, eliminating its printed Saturday edition.

== Controversies ==
A 1998 American Journalism Review survey acknowledged The Oklahoman's positive contributions as a corporate citizen of Oklahoma, but characterized the paper as suffering from understaffing, uninspired content, and political bias. In 1999, the Columbia Journalism Review published an article calling The Oklahoman the "Worst Newspaper in America"; the CJR cited the paper's conformance to the right-wing political views of the Gaylord family, alleged racist hiring practices, and high costs of ads. In more recent years OPUBCO Communications Group has won a number of awards for innovations, newspaper redesign, First Amendment coverage, sports coverage, breaking news and in-depth multimedia projects.

On May 1, 2014, the sports section ran the headline "Mr. Unreliable" in reference to Kevin Durant's performance against the Memphis Grizzlies during the 2014 NBA Playoffs. The headline drew national criticism. Sports Director Mike Sherman later issued an apology.

On June 3, 2020, the editorial board published an opinion piece about the George Floyd protests with the word "thuggish" in the headline. After considerable backlash, the editorial board issued an apology.

== Past products ==
The last edition of the evening Oklahoma City Times was published on Feb. 29, 1984. It was folded into The Daily Oklahoman beginning with the March 1, 1984 issue.

Look At OKC was launched in 2006 as a weekly alt magazine to compete with the Oklahoma Gazette. It was distributed in free racks throughout the Oklahoma City metro area until it was quietly discontinued, with the final issue being published on June 28, 2018.

In December 2017, The Oklahoman launched a premium quarterly magazine titled The OK (pronounced 'oak'). This magazine was bundled with Sunday editions of The Oklahoman, as well as distributed via newsstands. Each issue would cover a different topic including food, travel, or health, with the final issue of the year being a photography-centric issue. It appears The OK was discontinued in late 2018, with the final issue being released that December.

NewsOK was originally launched on August 19, 2001, as a joint venture between KWTV-DT and The Oklahoman; however, OPUBCO would obtain full control of NewsOK in 2008. NewsOK would continue to serve as OPUBCO's online news brand, and the "OK' branding would be expanded to other online properties including HomesOK, CarsOK, and JobsOK. However, due to market confusion and a desire to have a unified brand across print and digital media, The Oklahoman announced it would retire the NewsOK brand and redirect all NewsOK.com URLs to Oklahoman.com on May 22, 2019. As of June 9, 2020, over one year after the brand was retired, the NewsOK brand could still be seen at Oklahoman.com, including as the site's favicon and branding within several sections of the website, including Autos, BrandInsight, Homes, Obituaries, Local A&E, Parties Extra, Videos, Shop, Privacy Policy, and Terms of Use.

In November 2019, while attempting to merge the @NewsOK and @TheOklahoman Twitter handles, The Oklahoman lost control of both handles to an unknown third party. This forced the newspaper to begin using @TheOklahoman_ as its official Twitter handle.

== Circulation ==
Circulation stood at 25,304 daily subscribers, according to a 2022 annual report published by Gannet. In 2018, The Oklahoman reported an average paid circulation of 92,073, with digital subscriptions making up 20,409 of that number, according to an Oklahoman article published December 27, 2018.

== Pulitzer Prize for Editorial Cartooning ==
In 1939, Charles George Werner, a rookie political cartoonist at the newspaper, won the Pulitzer Prize for Editorial Cartooning. The winning cartoon, "Nomination for 1938", depicted the Nobel Peace Prize resting on a grave marked "Czechoslovakia 1919–1938". Published on October 6, 1938, the cartoon bit at the recently concluded Munich Agreement, which transferred the Sudetenland (a strategically important part of Czechoslovakia) to Nazi Germany.

Another notable cartoonist for the paper was Jim Lange, who worked for the paper for 58 years and produced over 19,000 cartoons.

== Awards ==
- 2013 Heartland Regional Emmy Award (Commercial - Single Spot): Thunder Coverage Pictures in Motion
- 2013 ADDY (Bronze Award) - Sales Promotion: Campus Corner Sponsorship Promotion
- 2013 ADDY (Bronze Award) - Newspaper: Devon Energy/The Oklahoman School Archive Campaign
- 2013 ADDY (Bronze Award) - Newspaper (Spread or Multiple Page): Devon Tower Promotion
- 2013 ADDY (Silver Award) - Television: The Oklahoman Thunder Animated Photography
- 2013 ADDY (Silver Award) - Digital Advertising (Websites, Consumer - Products): Braums Ice Cream and Dairy Stores
- 2013 ADDY (Silver Award) - Digital Advertising (Websites, Consumer - Products): Tony's Tree Plantation
- 2012 Nine Telly Awards: The Video Department won two Silver and seven Bronze awards in the annual international contest. Silver is the highest award.
- 2012 Best of Photojournalism 2012: Sarah Phipps finished third in Still Photography/Sports Feature.
- 2012 SABEW (Society of American Business Editors and Writers) Best in Business: Bryan Painter, first, for drought series
- 2012 APSE (Associated Press Sports Editors): Five "Top 10s": Daily Section, Sunday Section, Special Section and Multimedia. Berry Tramel also finished third in Columns (75,001 to 175,000).
- 2012 NABJ (National Association of Black Journalists): Two finalists: Jenni Carlson and Sarah Phipps, for "Raising Barry Sanders," and Yvette Walker, for "Finding a Forever Family"
- 2012 ACES (American Society of Copy Editors): Pat Gilliland, third in Headlines (Newspapers 160,000 to 240,000)
- 2012 PBWA (Pro Basketball Writers Association): Darnell Mayberry, first, for his profile "Where did this guy come from: Now an all-star, Westbrook traveled a long road to the NBA"
- 2012 OWAA (Outdoor Writers Association of America) 2012 Excellence in Craft: Ed Godfrey, second, "Blog Contest-Conservation Category" for his post "What will happen to the lower Illinois"
- 2012 National Press Foundation: Jaclyn Cosgrove chosen as "Alzheimer's Issues 2012" fellow
- 2012 Associated Press Media Editors: Finalist, Innovator of the Year (winner to be announced in September) and Honorable Mention, First Amendment, for DHS coverage
- 2012 Great Plains: Website of the Year and 45 total awards (12 firsts and 33 finalists)
- 2012 First Amendment Awards (Fort Worth SPJ): Nine total awards, including three firsts and six finalists
- 2012 SPJ Mark of Excellence: Adam Kemp
- 2012 National Press Photographers Region 7: Sarah Phipps, Bryan Terry and Chris Landsberger finished in the Top 10.
- 2012 AP-ONE (Associated Press-Oklahoma News Executives): The Oklahoman/NewsOK.com won four of the five major categories (General Excellence, first, for best newspaper; website, first, for NewsOK.com; Photo Sweepstakes: Chris Landsberger; New Journalist of the Year: Tiffany Gibson). Overall, 18 firsts and 37 total awards.
- 2012 SPJ: Bryan Dean won the First Amendment Award, and the NIC won 31 total awards, including 10 firsts, in the annual Society of Professional Journalists' Oklahoma Pro Chapter contest.
- 2012 Sports Writer of the Year: Berry Tramel
- 2012 Farm Bureau Journalist of the Year: Bryan Painter.
- 2010 Society of News Design Award of Excellence: Redesigns/Overall Newspapers
- 2010 National Association of Black Journalists Salute to Excellence New Media-Sports: Winner, Minister of Millwood
- 2010, 2009 and 2007: Online News Association, Finalist, Breaking News and General Excellence
- 2010 Southern Newspaper Publishers Association: Best Website and six other awards in video, multimedia projects, local reporting and photography
- 2009 Innovator of the Year: Associated Press Managing Editors (APME News/Winter 2009)
- 2009 Webby Award Official Honoree (Top 12 newspaper websites in world), International Academy of Digital Arts and Sciences
- 2009 Public Service in Online Journalism, Society of Professional Journalists' Sigma Delta Chi Awards
- 2009 First Amendment Award, Society of Professional Journalists
- 2002–2009 Associated Press Sports Editors Top 10 or Top 20 in daily, Sunday and special sections and columns, features, breaking news and projects
