= American Shetland Pony =

American breed of pony

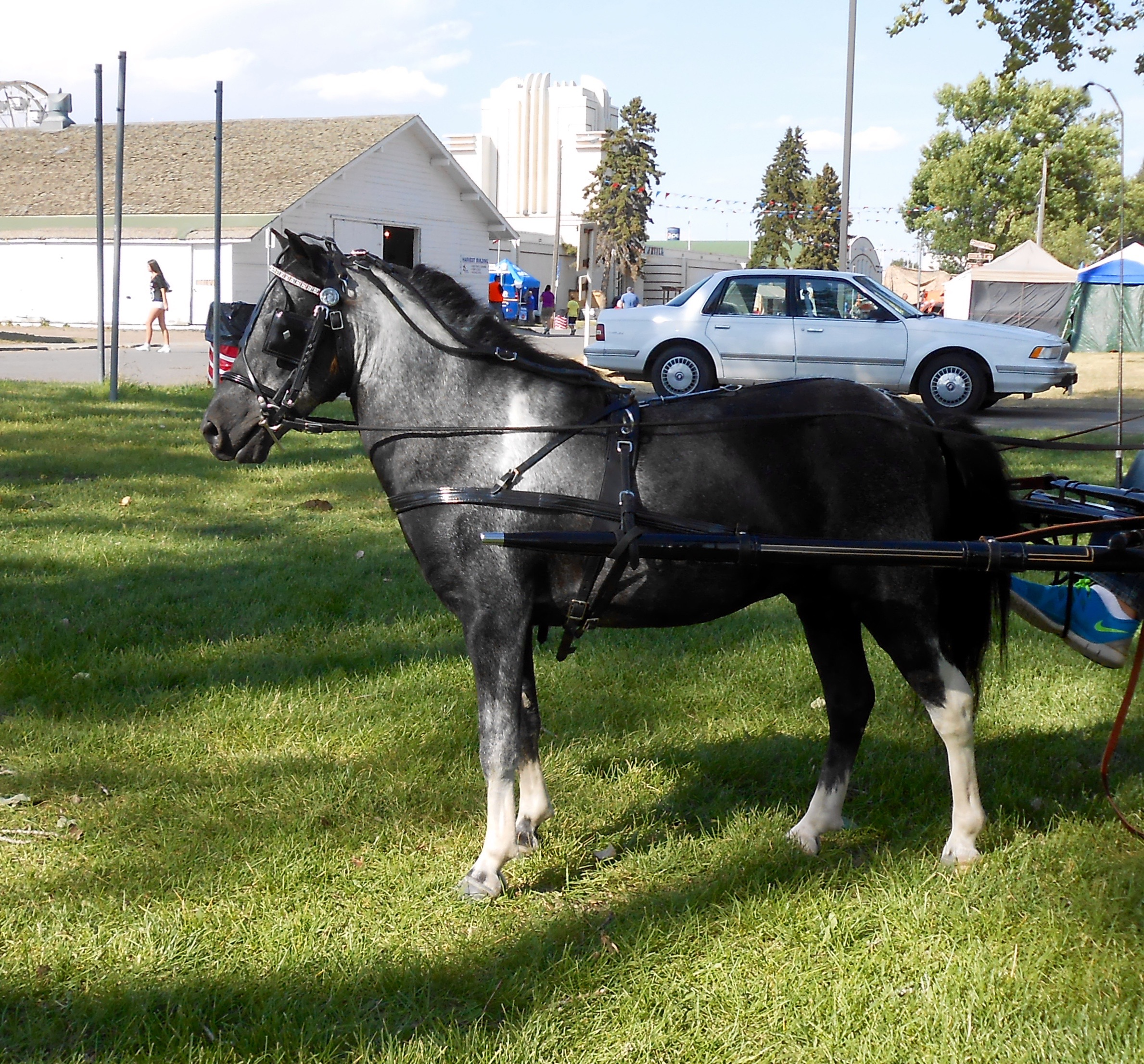
- Harnessed to a sulky, Great Falls, Montana
- Country of origin: United States
- Distribution: United States
- Standard: American Shetland Pony Club (p. 136)
- Use: riding, driving

Traits
- Height: to 117 cm (11.2 hands)
- Color: any color but spotted

The American Shetland Pony is an American breed of pony. It derives from the traditional Shetland Pony from the Shetland Isles of Scotland, but as a result of cross-breeding with other horse and pony breeds, is taller and more elegant. It does not have the thick coat of the traditional Shetland, and in conformation is more similar to the Hackney Pony, with some Arab influence. It is the most numerous pony breed in the United States; numbers in 1994 were estimated at over 50,000. It is one of two American pony breeds derived from the traditional Shetland, the other being the Pony of the Americas.

== History ==
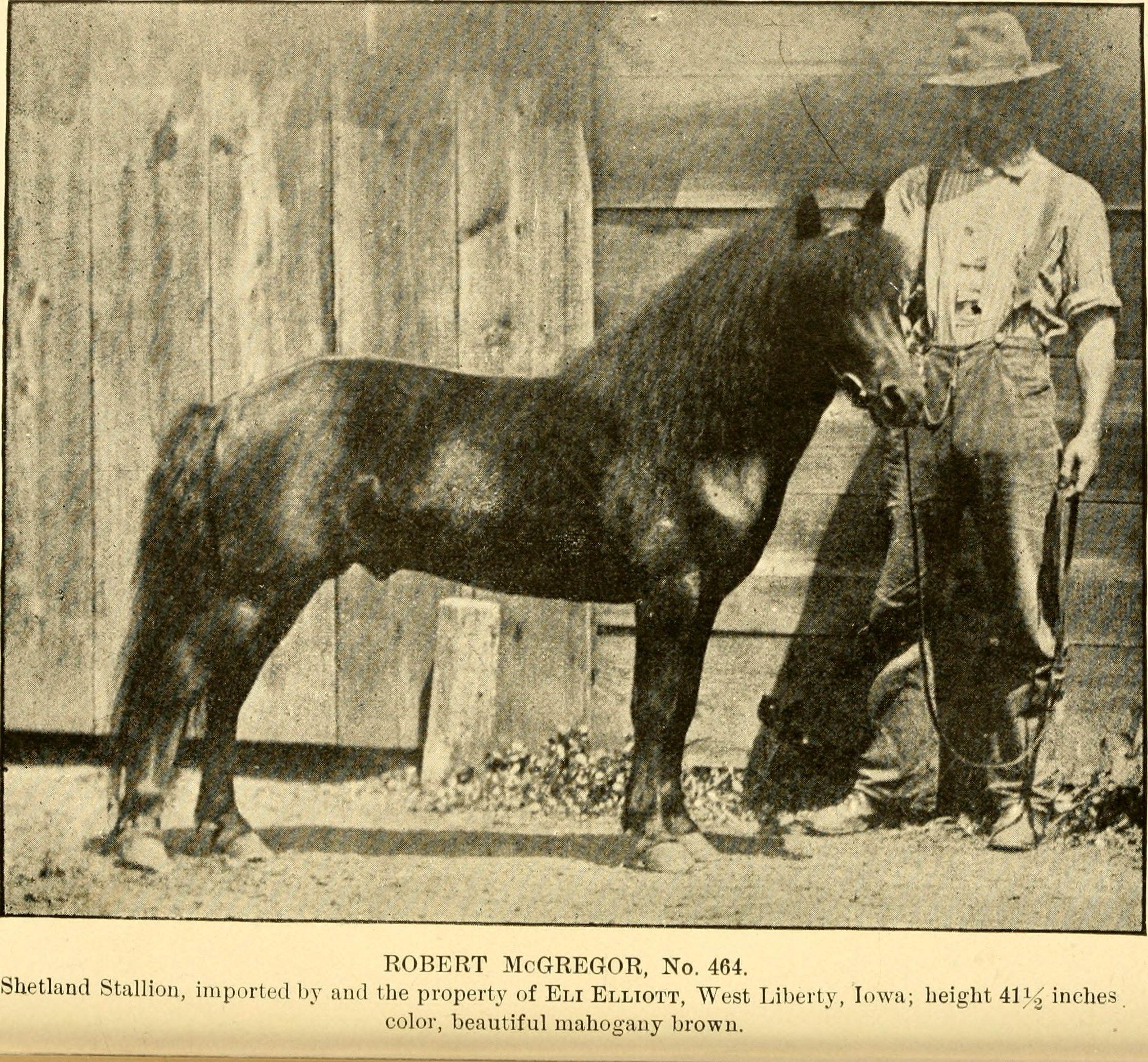
A stallion imported to the United States by Eli Elliot

The first documented importation of Shetland Ponies to the United States was in 1885, when Eli Elliot imported seventy-five of them. A breed association, the American Shetland Pony Club, was formed in 1888. The original stock was crossbred with various other breeds, principally the Hackney Pony. Arabian, Harness Show Pony and Welsh breeds were also used. The result was a taller and more elegant pony than the classic Shetland, with longer legs and finer bone, high withers and a sloping shoulder, and a high action particularly well-suited to harness work. It does not have the thick coat of the traditional Shetland, but supposedly retains the hardiness and endurance of that breed; in conformation it is more similar to the Hackney Pony, also showing some Arab influence.

It is the most numerous pony breed in the United States; numbers in 1994 were estimated at over 50,000. It is one of two American pony breeds derived from the traditional Shetland, the other being the Pony of the Americas. It was the principal influence on another Shetland-derived breed, the German Classic Pony.

American Shetland Ponies may be registered in the American Shetland Pony Club stud book, in one of four sections: foundation, classic, modern, and modern pleasure; they are distinguished by minor variations in conformation, the "foundation" type being the smallest and most similar to the American Shetland of the 1950s. In the past, American Shetlands were registered in section B of the stud book, and the traditional Shetland Pony in section A. The stud book has been closed – with some exceptions – to imported Shetlands since 1955.

== Use ==
The American Shetland Pony is well-suited to harness use. It may be used as a roadster to pull sulkies, or in fine harness pulling two-wheeled or four-wheeled carts. It may be ridden under either a Western or English saddle, and is also shown at halter.
