= Hackney pony =

Breed of horse

Hackney Pony
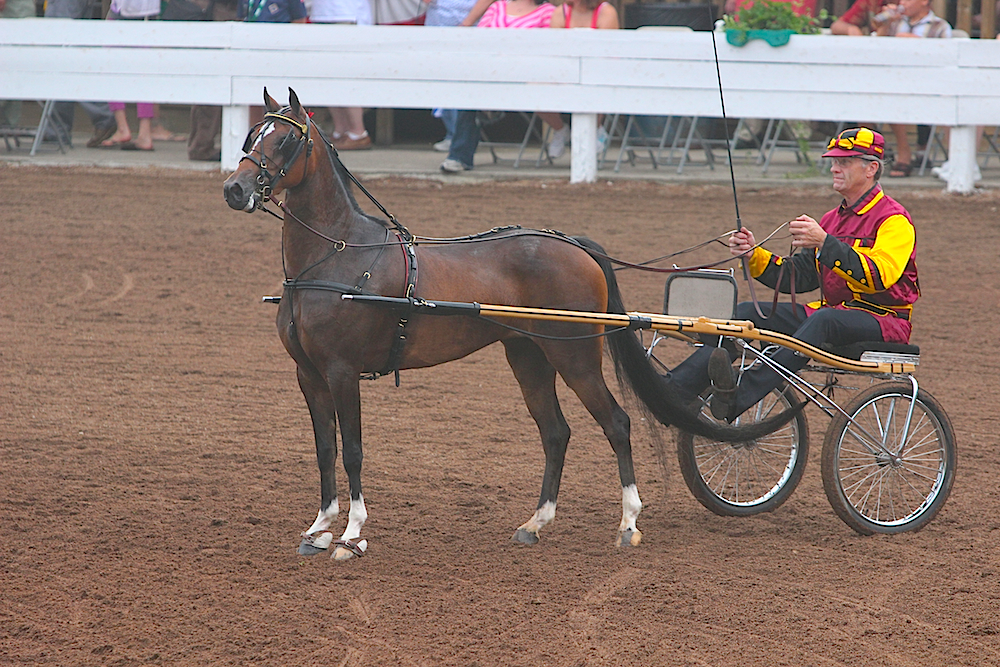

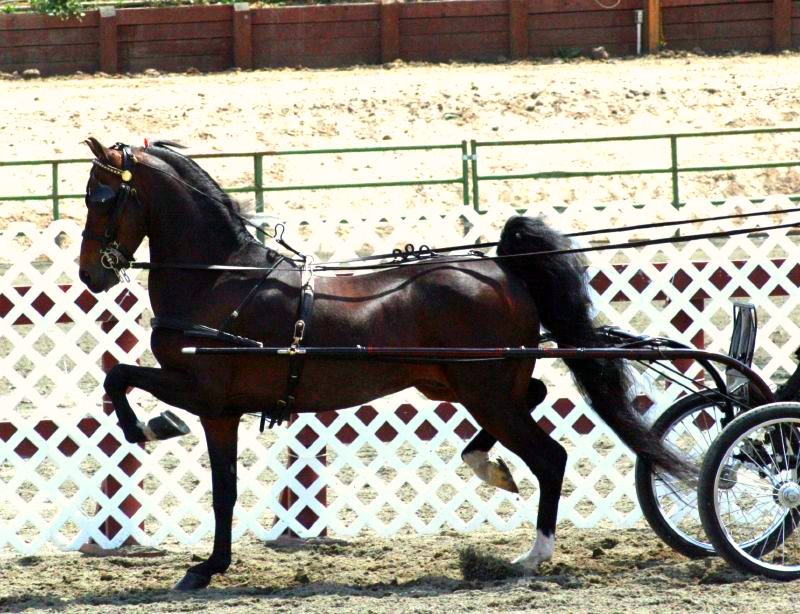
- Country of origin: England

Traits
- Distinguishing features: Fine, slim, well-proportioned body; long, arched neck; set tail; animated and exaggerated motion

The Hackney pony is a breed of pony closely related to the Hackney horse. Originally bred to pull carriages, they are used today primarily as show ponies. The breed does not have its own stud book, but shares one with the Hackney horse in all countries that have an official Hackney Stud Book Registry.

== Characteristics ==
The Hackney pony may not be above 14.2 hands (58 inches, 147 cm) and usually range between 12 and 14 hh. It should have true pony characteristics, and should not be a scaled down version of the Hackney Horse. The pony should have a small pony head, carried high, with alert and pricked ears and large, intelligent eyes. The neck should be muscular, arched, and carried proudly. Hackney ponies should have powerful shoulders, a compact back, and a light frame. The legs are strong with good joints, but the bone is usually fine. The feet are very hard, and are usually allowed to grow long in the toe to accentuate the action of the pony. The tail is often set and is carried high. They usually have even more exaggerated action than the Hackney horse, knees rising as high as possible and hocks coming right under the body. The action should be fluid, spectacular, and energetic.

Hackney ponies may be black, bay (which includes brown), or chestnut. Bay is by far the most common color, but black is also relatively common. Chestnuts, on the other hand, are extremely rare; their color is usually particularly light, and chestnut ponies often possess flaxen manes and tails. Many hackneys also have some white markings. Due to the sabino gene, common in the breed, the Hackney pony may have white markings on its body as well as on its legs and head. The sabino gene (possibly a gene complex), is generally unpredictable, so breeding solely for body white marks can be difficult.

The Hackney pony also has a reputation for being tenacious and fearless, qualities that are seen in top-tier show ponies. They are very brave, alert, and active, and possess great stamina. Generally, they have pony character. Hackneys have a reputation for being friendly toward humans, and are suitable for both show and as companion animals.

== Breed history ==
The Hackney pony was originally developed by Christopher Wilson. He used Sir George, a Hackney stallion foaled in 1866, to breed with Fell Pony mares, and then interbred the offspring to make a fixed type of pony. He desired to create not a miniaturized horse, but rather a true pony with such characteristics. Extracting the large trot and other characteristics of the hackney horse and applying them to this true type of pony, he was successful in creating the form which was desired. This is one case of an entire type of breed that is formed in a controlled, private environment. In addition to the mixing of Fell ponies and Hackney horses, the Hackney pony probably also has much Welsh Pony blood.

First known as Wilson Ponies, they were usually kept out all year, wintering in the inhospitable Fells with little food or care. This developed the breed's great toughness and endurance. By the 1880s the breed was established, and was very much liked for its great trotting ability and class.

The breed was used in Great Britain as carriage horses and were also imported into the United States. They were considered to be very stylish to drive during the late nineteenth and early twentieth centuries, when automobiles were still uncommon. After horses were replaced by cars as a primary means of transportation, Hackney ponies, along with many other horse breeds, were deemed unable to contribute to society and declined considerably. After World War II, however, the Hackney pony developed into primarily a show pony, and remain being bred for that purpose today. Thus their drastic decline in numbers and plight toward extinction came to an end, and the breed was popularized once again.

Many Hackney pony breeders today continue to develop a quality, refined pony. In the United States, Hackney ponies have also had considerable influence on the American version of the Shetland pony. They were crossbred with Shetlands to produce the American Shetland show pony of today, a type which displays many of the refined characteristics of the Hackney pony. The Hackney has also influenced the miniature horse, adding refinement and action.

== Uses ==
The Hackney pony is usually shown being driven in harness or shown in hand. In the US, they are also shown under saddle. Most classes require both a "Park Trot," executed in a highly collected manner and then exhibitors are given the command, "Show your pony," which permits an increase in speed to exhibit each pony to its best advantage. Excessive speed is undesirable and is penalized.

- The "harness pony" division is for ponies 12.2 hands (50 inches, 127 cm) or under. They are driven fine harness style, pulling a four-wheel viceroy. Ponies wear their full mane and tail, and their action is high and animated. Attire for drivers is suits for men and dress or formal attire for women.
- Roadsters are shown to a two-wheel sulky or bike with the driver wearing racing silks. Ponies are judged upon their action when trotting, as well as their speed, conformation, and temperament. In addition to being driven, road ponies are also shown under saddle by junior exhibitors.
- Pleasure driving classes have ponies shown to a two-wheeled cart with basket, and the driver usually wears more casual dress. They are shown at a road gait, pleasure trot, and flat walk. Temperament is a more primary factor for judges.
- In "hackney pony" classes (sometimes called cobtail classes), ponies are shown with a tightly braided mane and a short tail (which only appears to have been docked).
US hackney pony class types

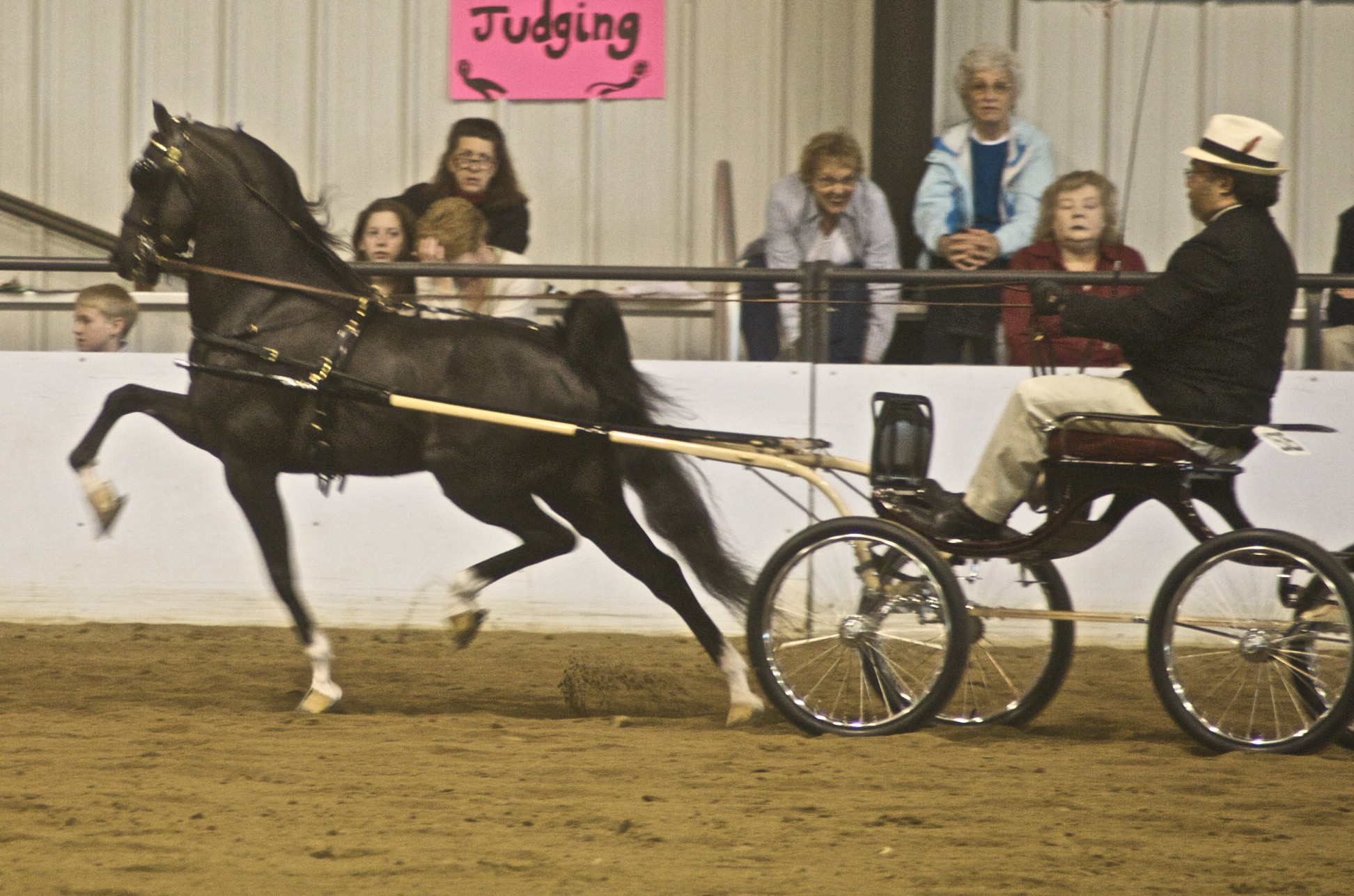
Harness pony (Fine harness)

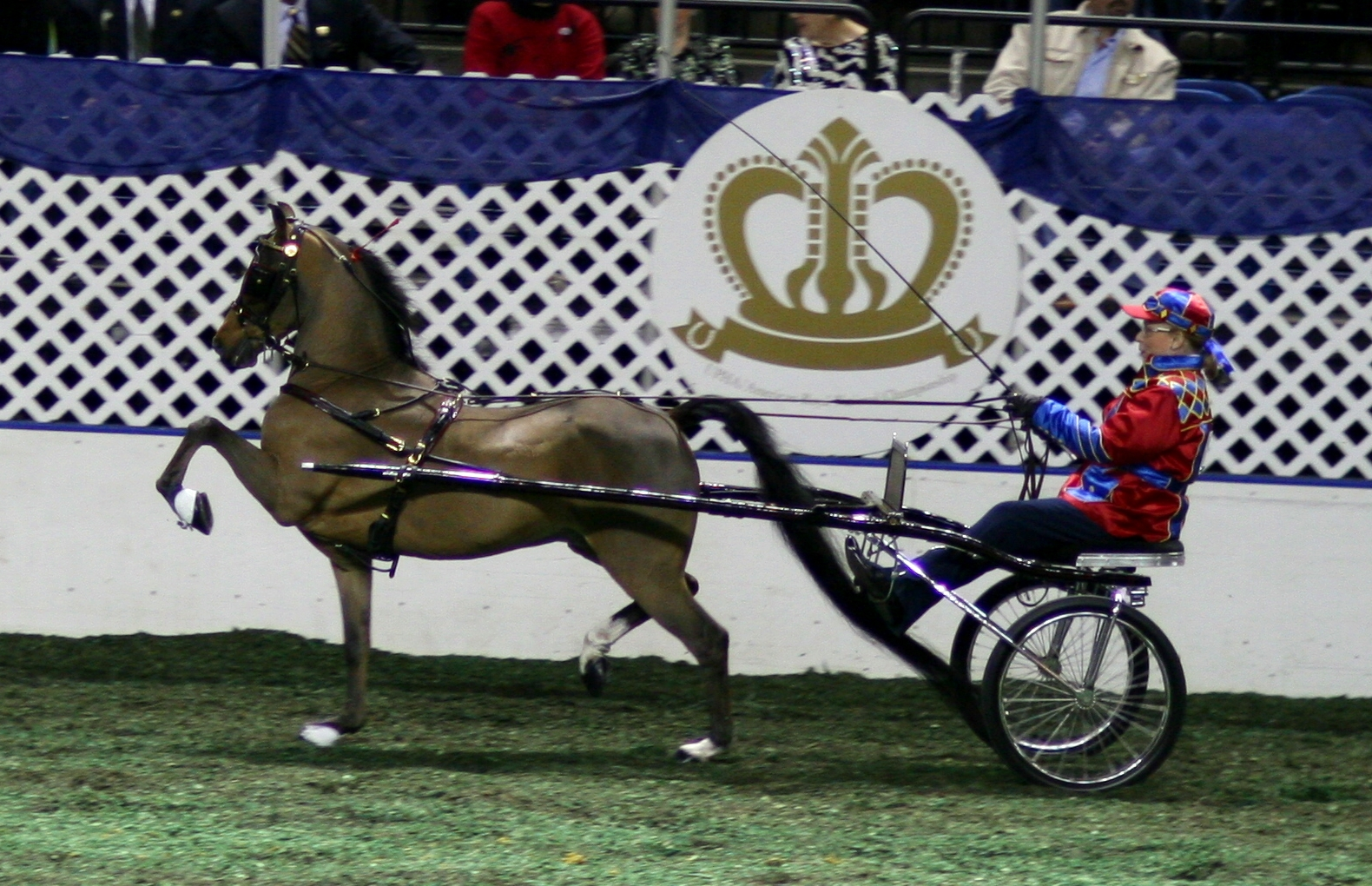
Roadster pony

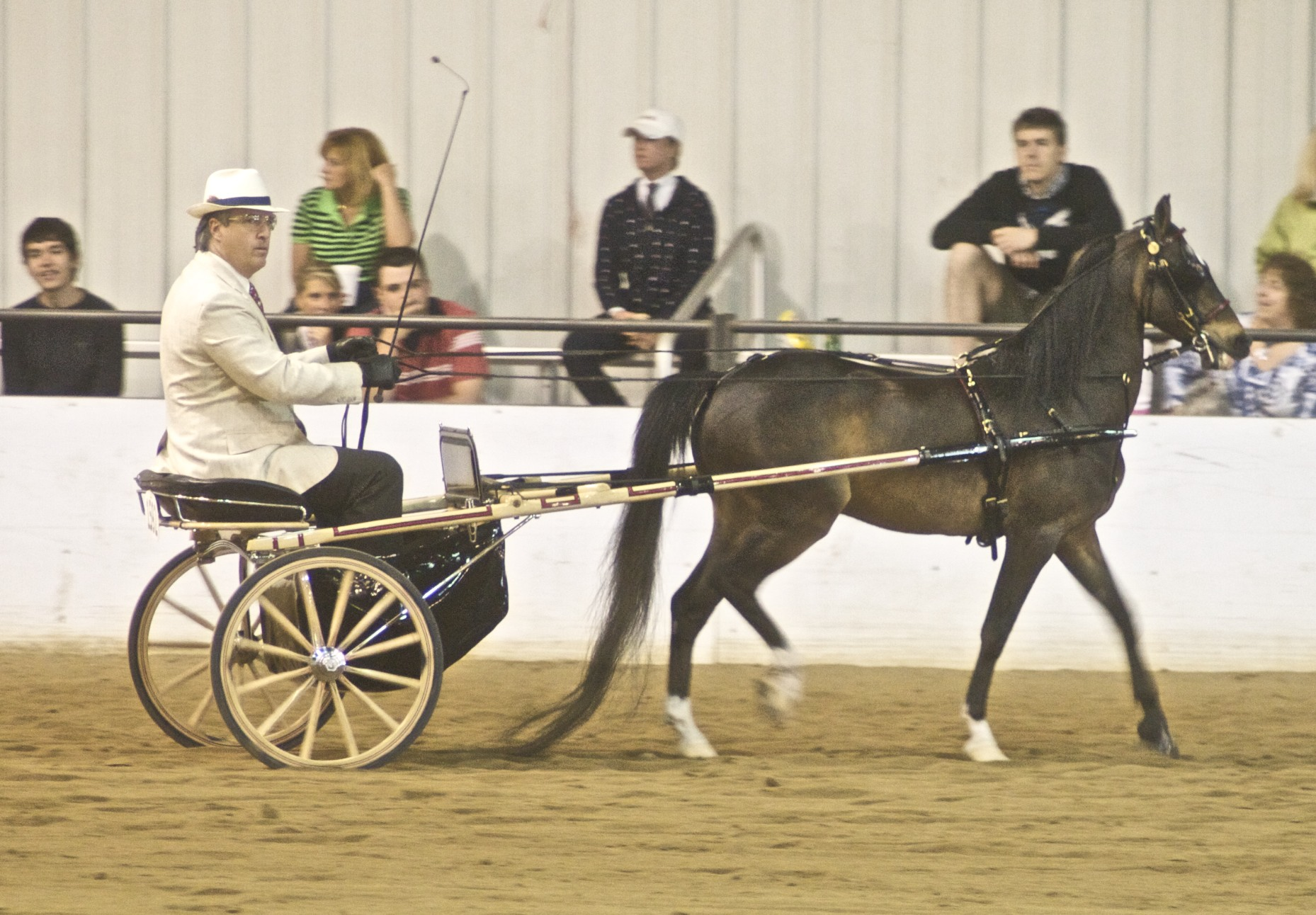
Pleasure driving

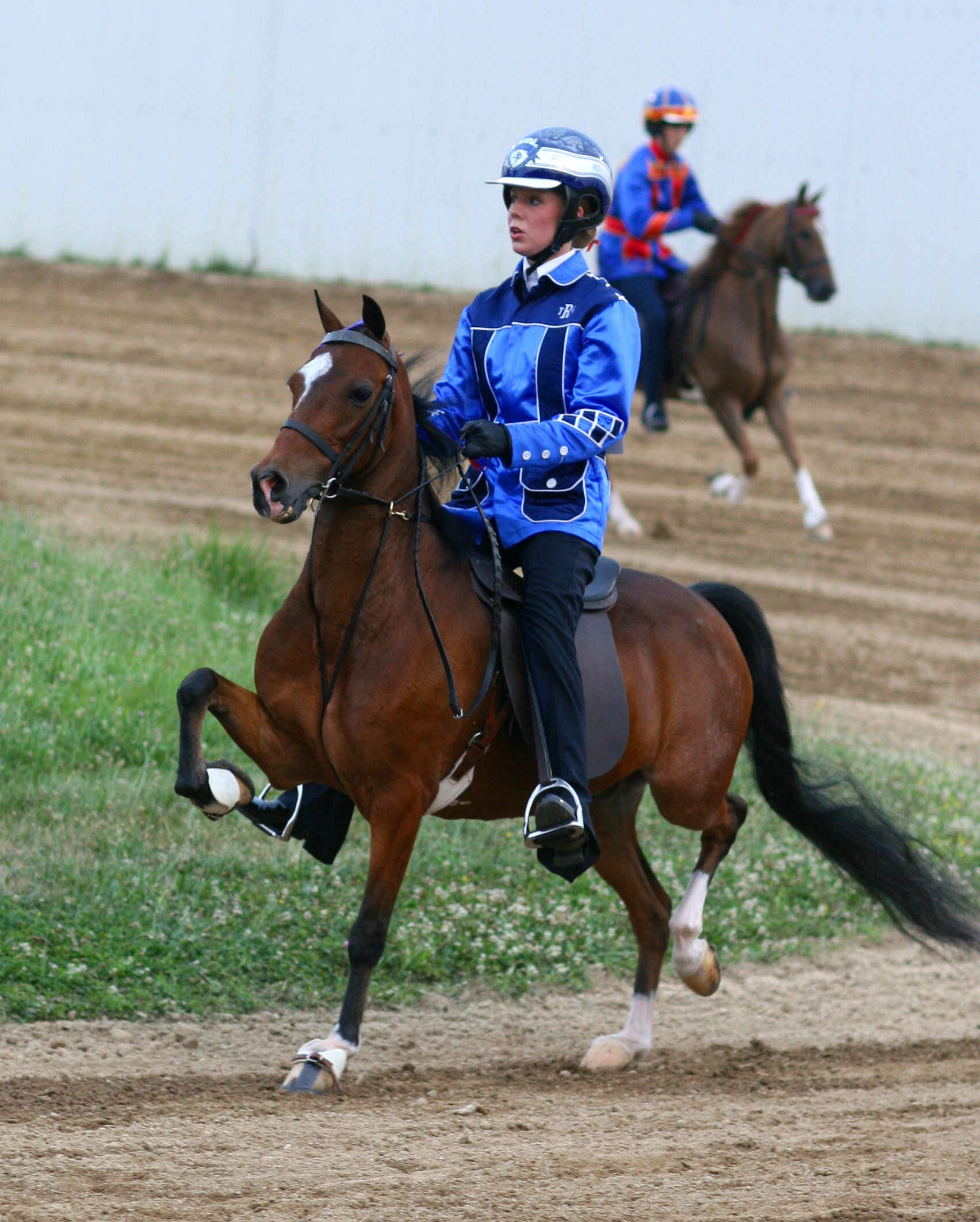
Roadster under saddle

== See also ==
- Hackney horse
- Horse show
- Fine harness
- Driving (horse)
