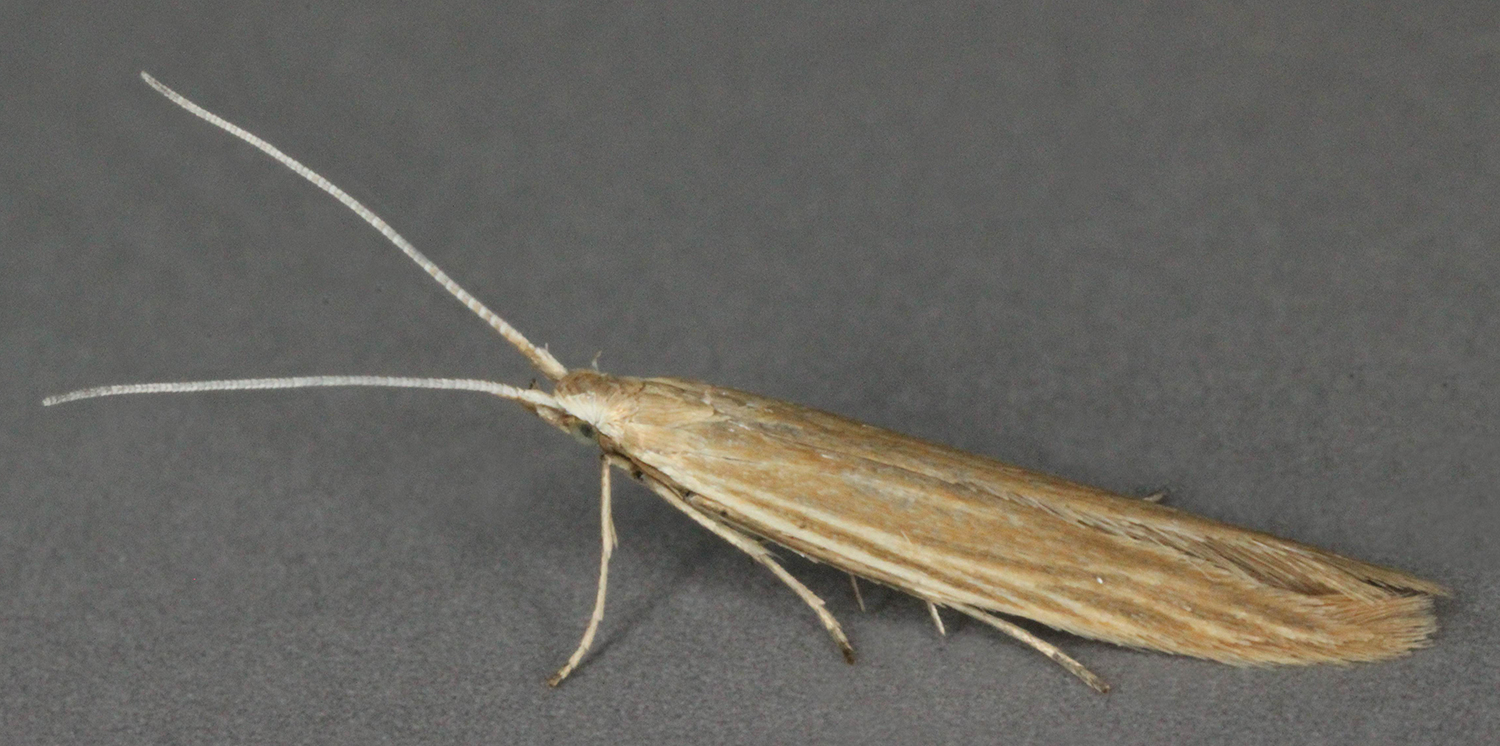
- Coleophora tamesis, North Wales

Scientific classification
- Kingdom: Animalia
- Phylum: Arthropoda
- Class: Insecta
- Order: Lepidoptera
- Family: Coleophoridae
- Genus: Coleophora
- Species: C. tamesis

Binomial name
- Coleophora tamesis Waters, 1929

Synonyms
- Coleophora cratipennella (auct. nec Clemens, 1865) (misidentification)

= Coleophora tamesis =

Species of moth

Coleophora tamesis is a moth of the family Coleophoridae found in Asia and Europe.

== Description ==
The wingspan is 11–14 mm. Wingspan 11–14 mm. Head and thorax greyish-brown. Labial palps light grey. Forewings yellowish-brown with a yellowish-white line at the costa from base to tip. In the middle of the forewing yellow-white longitudinal lines. Hindwings grey.

Adults are on wing from mid-June to August.

The larvae feed on the generative organs of jointed rush (Juncus articulatus) and saltmarsh rush (Juncus gerardii), forming a case made from silk and the remains of the seed capsule. It is 6–7 mm in length and the mouth angle is 15–20°. The case is similar to Coleophora taeniipennella which also uses the same host plants. The larvae overwinter with pupation taking place in May and June.

== Distribution ==
It is found in most of Europe and is also known from the eastern part of the Palearctic realm and the Near East. It is also found in China.
