= Kizhi (disambiguation) =

Kizhi usually refers to either:

- kizhi or kishi – an ethnonymic suffix among the peoples of the Altai Republic, in north-east Russia, especially
  - the Altai-Kizhi ("Altai People") or;
- Kizhi Island in the Karelian Republic (north-west Russia), including
  - Kizhi Pogost, a historic site on the island.
- An alternative spelling for a kishie, a type pack basket native to the Shetland Islands.
