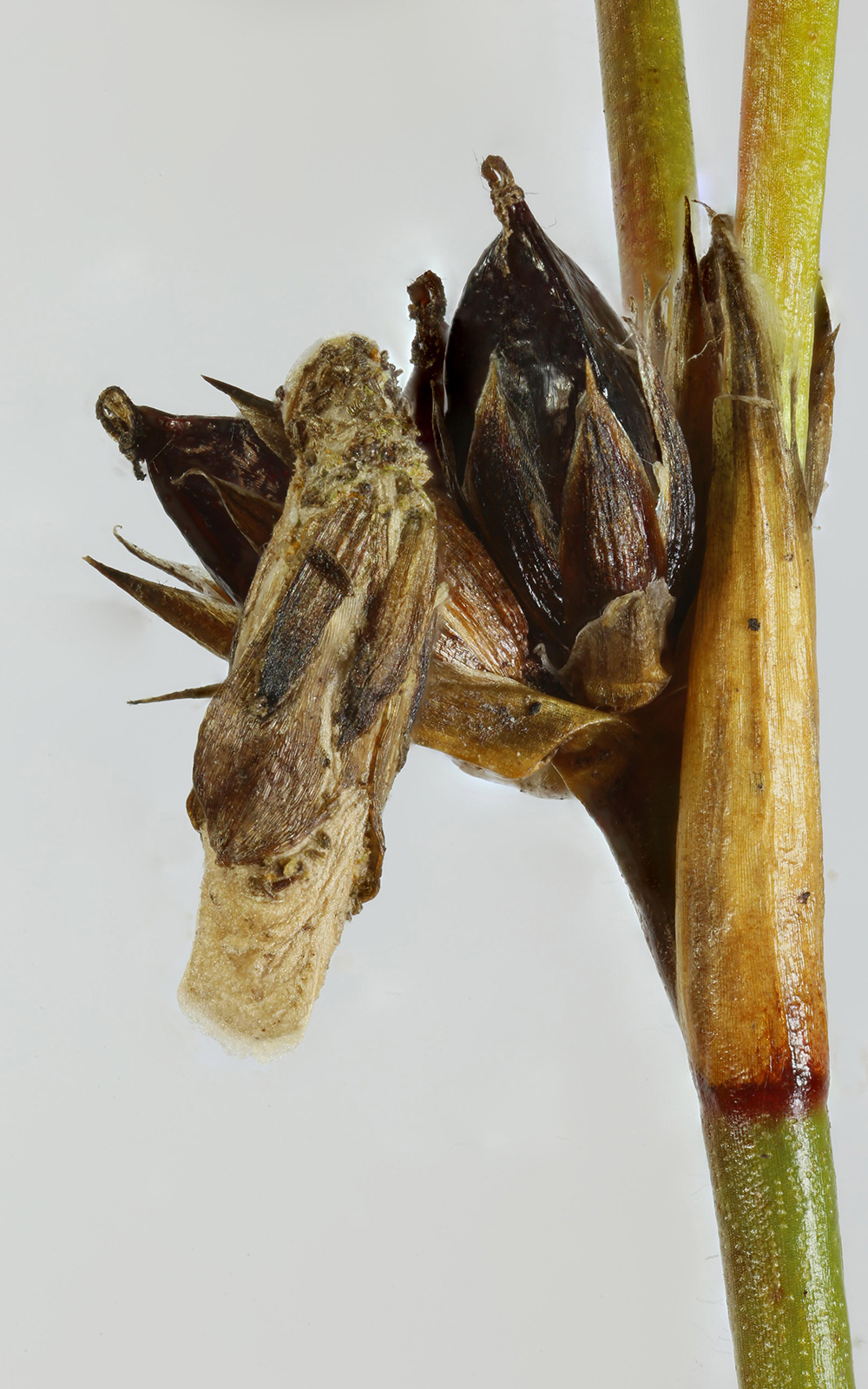
- Larva in case on Luzula images of imago

Scientific classification
- Kingdom: Animalia
- Phylum: Arthropoda
- Class: Insecta
- Order: Lepidoptera
- Family: Coleophoridae
- Genus: Coleophora
- Species: C. taeniipennella

Binomial name
- Coleophora taeniipennella Herrich-Schaffer, 1855

Synonyms
- Coleophora galactaula Meyrick, 1928

= Coleophora taeniipennella =

Species of moth

Coleophora taeniipennella is a moth of the family Coleophoridae. It is found in most of Europe.

== Description ==
The wingspan is 9–12 mm. Coleophora species have narrow blunt to pointed forewings and a weakly defined tornus. The hindwings are narrow-elongate and very long-fringed. The upper surfaces have neither a discal spot nor transverse lines. Each abdomen segment of the abdomen has paired patches of tiny spines which show through the scales. The resting position is horizontal with the front end raised and the cilia give the hind tip a frayed and upturned look if the wings are rolled around the body. C. taeniipennella characteristics include:- Forewing has distinct longitudinal pale streaks, with oblique streaks on or between the veins extending to the costa, without scattered fuscous scales. Only reliably identified by dissection and microscopic examination of the genitalia.

Adults are on wing in June and July.

The larvae feed on the seeds of jointed rush (Juncus articulatus), soft rush (Juncus effusus), Juncus inflexus, blunt-flowered rush (Juncus subnodulosus), sharp-flowered rush (Juncus acutiflorus) and compact rush (Juncus conglomeratus). They form a case 5 mm long with an angle of 20°.
