= Pleasure driving =

Horse show class involving horses pulling carts

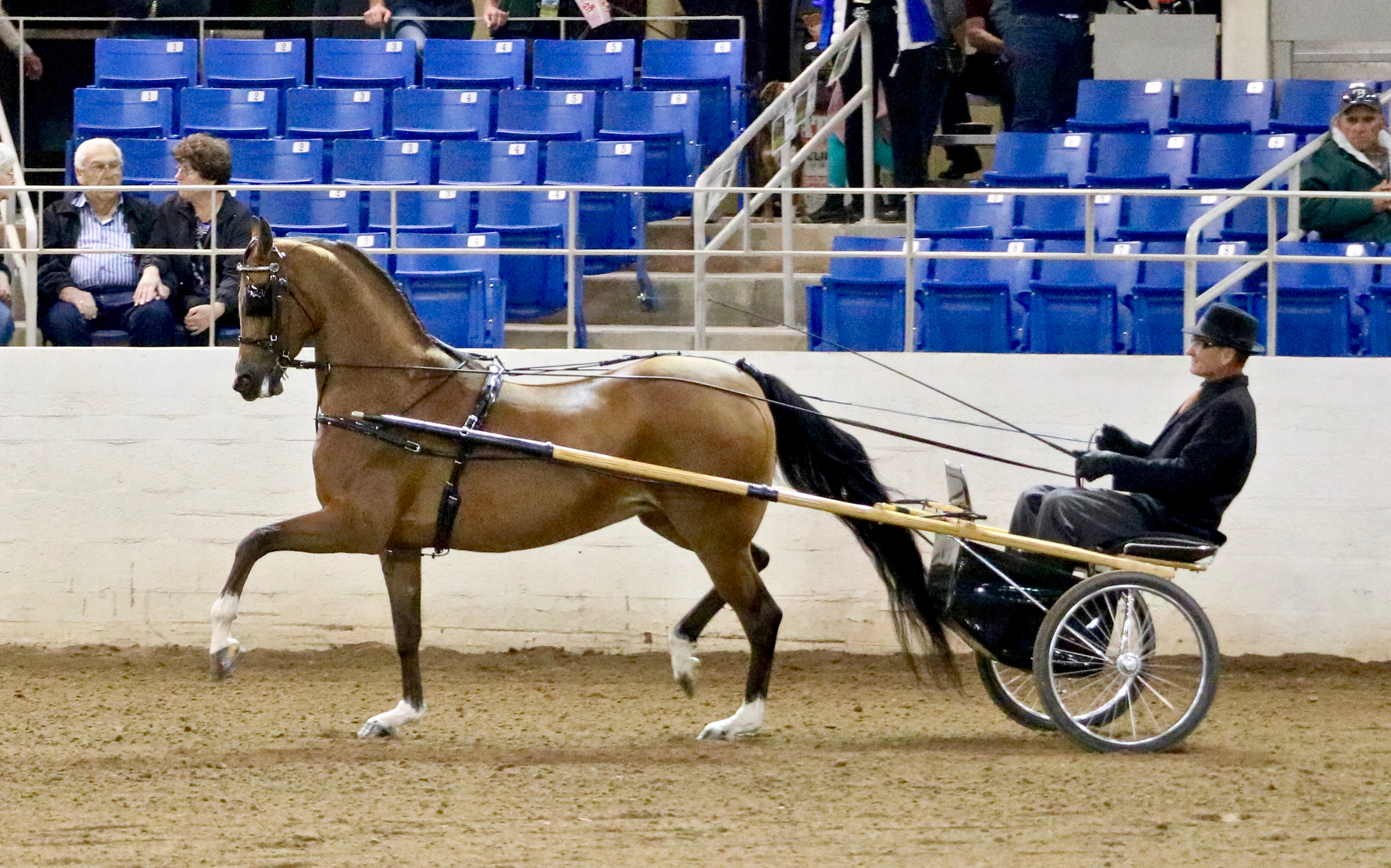
A Pleasure driving horse

Pleasure driving is a horse show class seen in the United States, which features light breeds of horses and ponies hitched to a two or four-wheeled show cart. Horses are driven at a walk and two speeds of trot, generally designated as a working or regular trot and an extended "strong" trot. Many horse breeds compete in Pleasure driving. Most classes are judged on the horse's manners, performance, quality and conformation.

== See also ==
- Horse harness
- Fine harness
