= Shetland pony =

Scottish breed of traditional pony

Shetland Pony
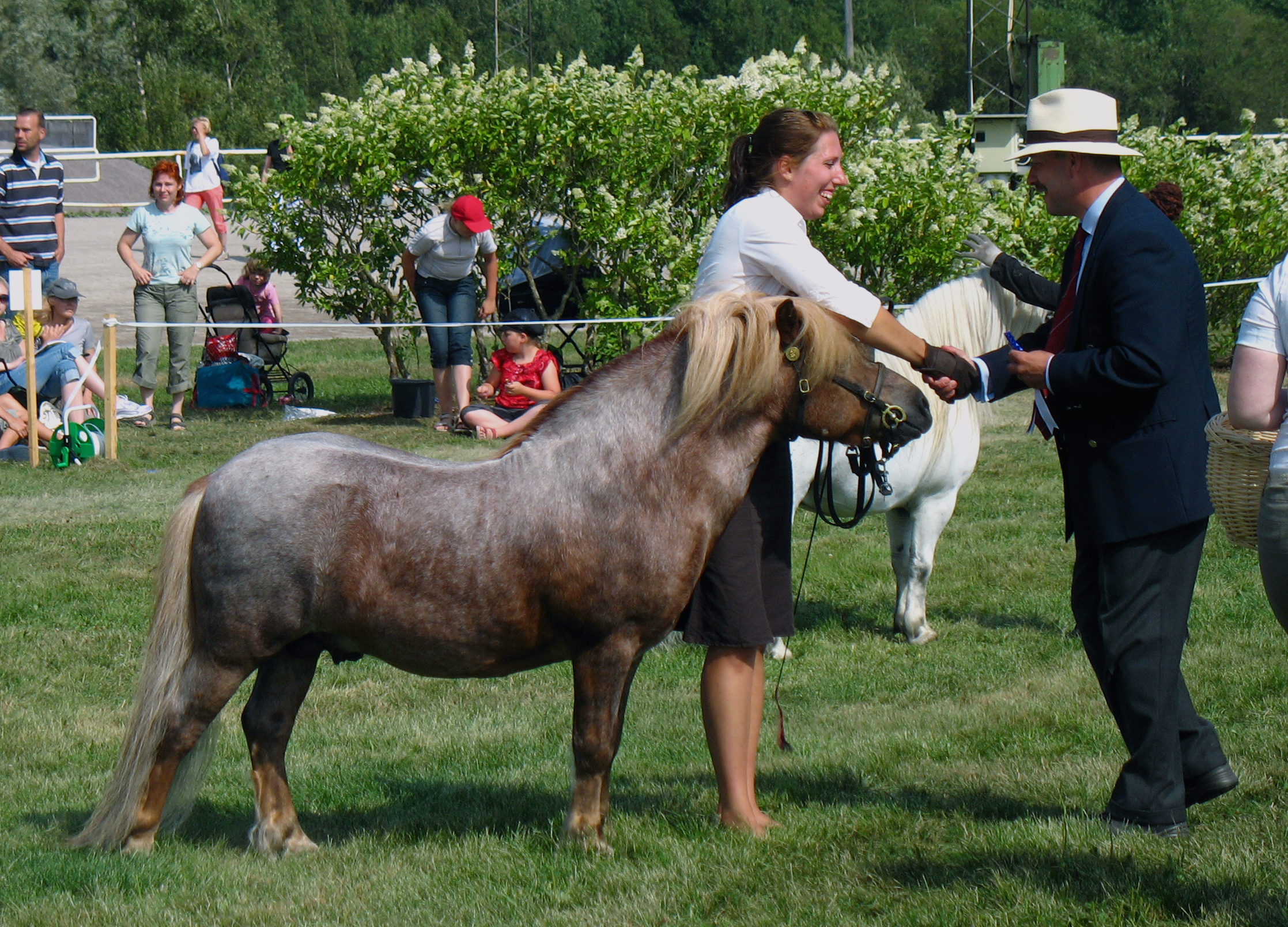

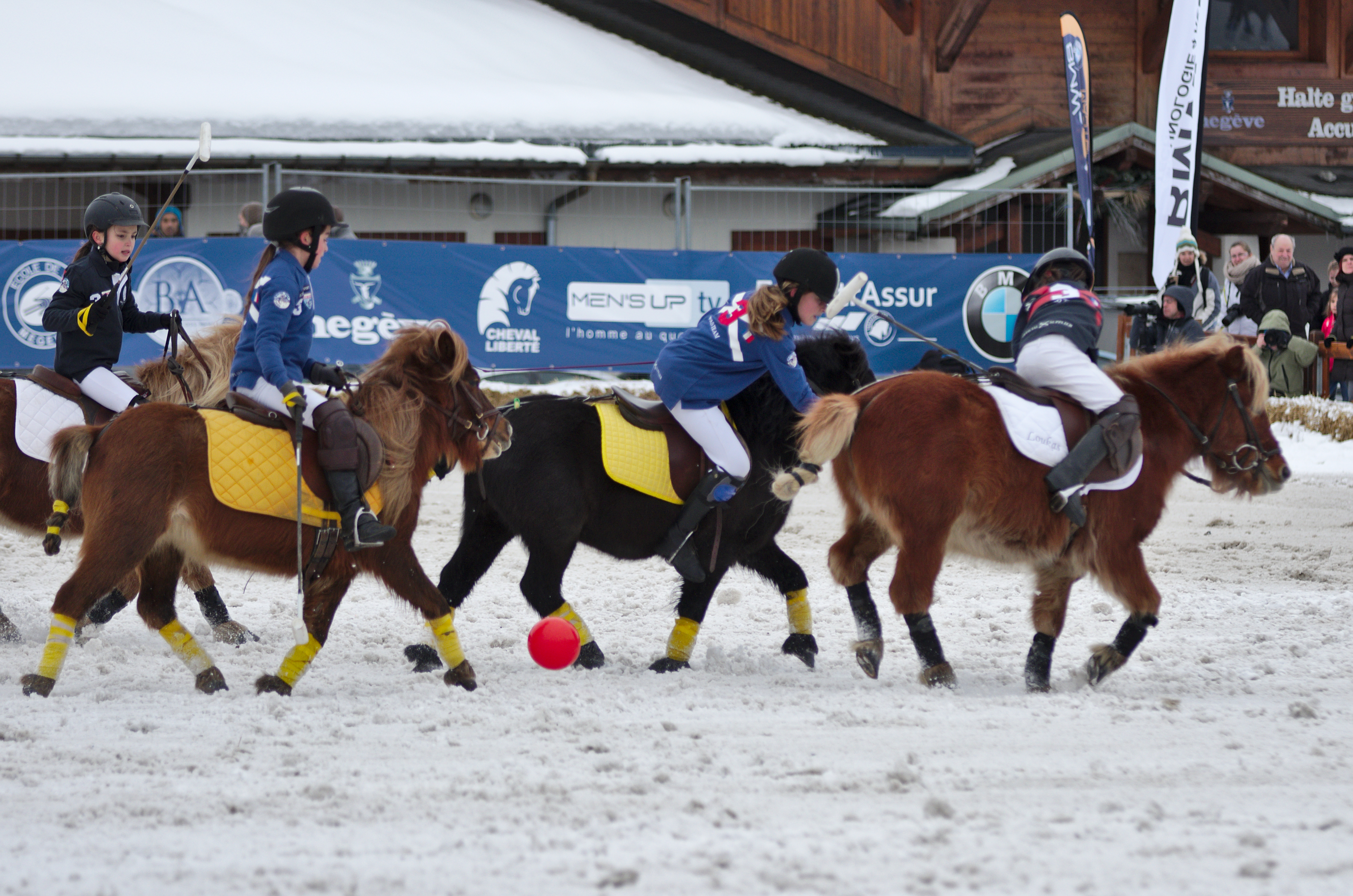
- Country of origin: Shetland Islands, Scotland

Traits
- Distinguishing features: Intelligent, small size, sturdy build, thick coat, compact and strong

Breed standards
- Shetland Pony Studbook Society

The Shetland pony or Sheltie is a small, hardy breed of pony from the Shetland Islands of Scotland, known for its strength, dense coat, and ability to thrive in harsh climates. It has been present on the islands since at least the Bronze Age. Historically, Shetland ponies were used for farm work, carrying peat and seaweed, and later as pit ponies in coal mines in Britain and the United States. Today they are used for driving and children's riding ponies. A few still perform traditional work on the islands. The breed is overseen by the Shetland Pony Stud-Book Society and has influenced several related pony breeds worldwide.

== Characteristics ==
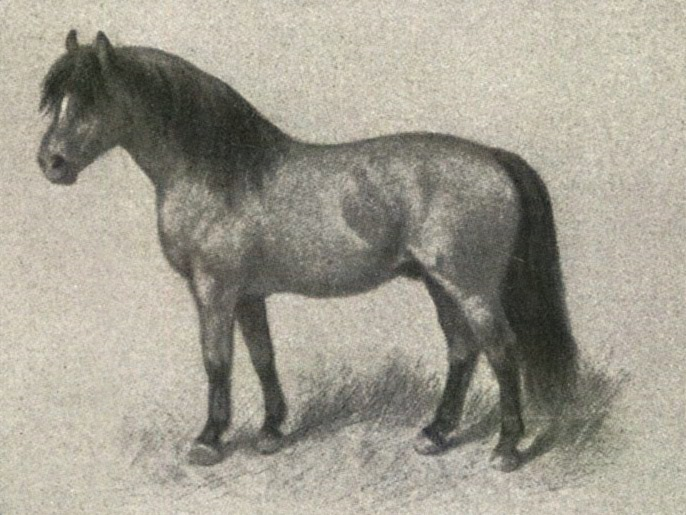
A classic image of an ideal Shetland pony, Nordisk familjebok (Swedish encyclopaedia), c. 1904–1926.

The Shetland Pony is hardy and strong, in part because it developed in the harsh conditions of the Shetland Islands. It has a small head, widely spaced eyes and small and alert ears. It has a short muscular neck, a compact stocky body, short strong legs and a shorter-than-normal cannon-bone in relation to its size. It may stand up to 107 cm (42 in) at the withers. A short broad back and deep girth are universal characteristics, as is a springy stride. It has a long thick mane and tail, and a dense double winter coat to withstand harsh weather. It may be of any known horse coat colour other than spotted. The breed is long-lived.

== Breed history ==
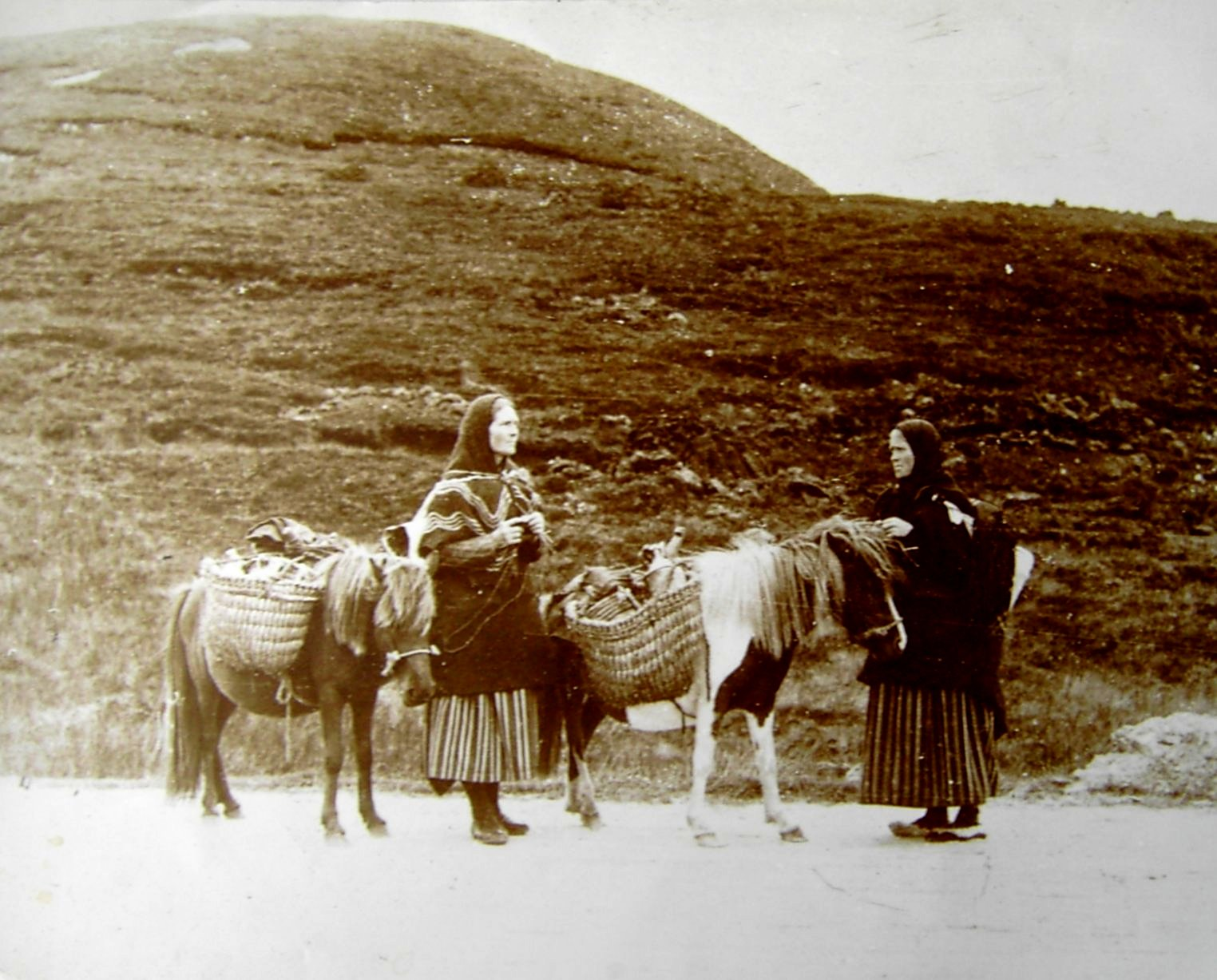
Two women of the Shetland Isles with ponies fitted with kishies: photograph taken about 1900

Shetland ponies originated in the Shetland Islands, located northeast of mainland Scotland. Small horses have been kept in the Shetland Islands since the Bronze Age. People who lived on the islands probably later crossed the native stock with ponies imported by Norse settlers. Shetland ponies were probably also influenced by the Celtic pony, brought to the islands by settlers between 2000 and 1000 BC. The harsh climate and scarce food developed the ponies into extremely hardy animals.

Shetland ponies were first used for pulling carts and for carrying (in kishies) peat, seaweed, and ploughing land. Then, as the Industrial Revolution increased the need for coal in the mid-nineteenth century, thousands of Shetland ponies were taken to mainland Britain to be pit ponies, working underground hauling coal, often for their entire (frequently shortened) lives. Coal mines in the eastern United States also imported some of these animals. The last mine that used Shetland ponies in the United States closed in 1971.

The Shetland Pony Stud-Book Society is the breed society for the traditional Shetland throughout the world. It was started in 1890 to maintain purity and encourage high-quality animals. In 1957, the Shetland Islands Premium Stallion Scheme was formed to subsidise high-quality registered stallions to improve the breeding stock.

A number of pony breeds derive from the traditional Shetland. These include the American Shetland Pony and Pony of the Americas in the United States, and the Deutsches Classic Pony in Germany.

== Uses ==
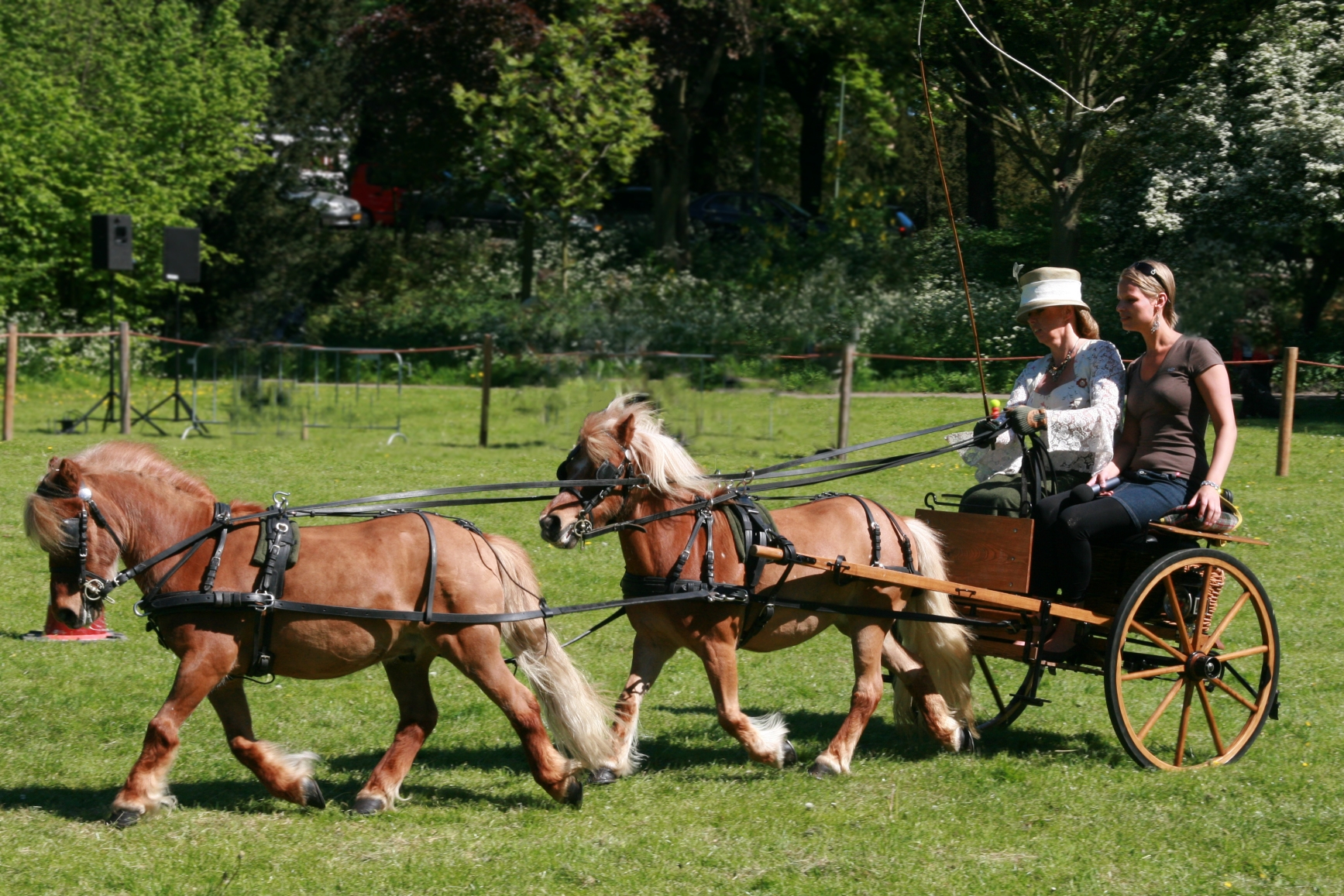
Shetlands being driven from a cart

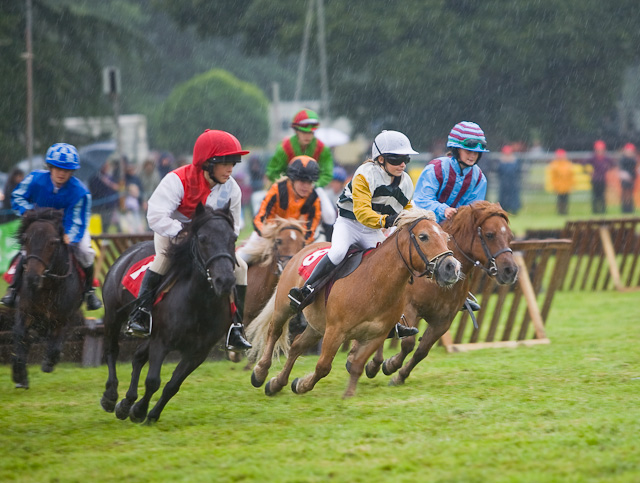
Shetland pony "Grand National" in the UK

Today, Shetlands are ridden by children and are shown by both children and adults at horse shows in harness driving classes as well as for pleasure driving outside of the show ring. Shetlands are ridden by small children at horse shows, in riding schools and stables as well as for pleasure. They are seen working in commercial settings such as fairs or carnivals to provide short rides for visitors. They are also seen at petting zoos and sometimes are used for therapeutic horseback riding purposes. In the United Kingdom, Shetlands are also featured in the Shetland Pony Grand National, galloping around a racecourse with young jockeys. A few Shetland ponies still fulfil traditional working roles on the islands, and can be seen carrying peat (which is abundant and used as a fuel source in Shetland) cut from the hillsides in large saddlebags. Their strong physique and ability to cross a variety of difficult terrain types means they are still a viable choice for the job, even in an age of mechanised agriculture.

Junior Harness Racing was founded in Queensland by a group of breeders to give young people aged 6–16 an opportunity to obtain a practical introduction to the harness racing industry. The children have the opportunity to drive Shetland ponies in harness under race conditions. No prize money is payable on pony races, although winners and place-getters receive medallions.

Miniature Shetlands have been trained as guide horses to take the same role as guide dogs. This task is also performed by other miniature horse breeds.

== See also ==
- American Shetland Pony
- List of domesticated Scottish breeds
- Mountain and moorland pony breeds
- Pony ride
- Shetland animal breeds
