= Fine harness =

American competition with high-stepping driving horses

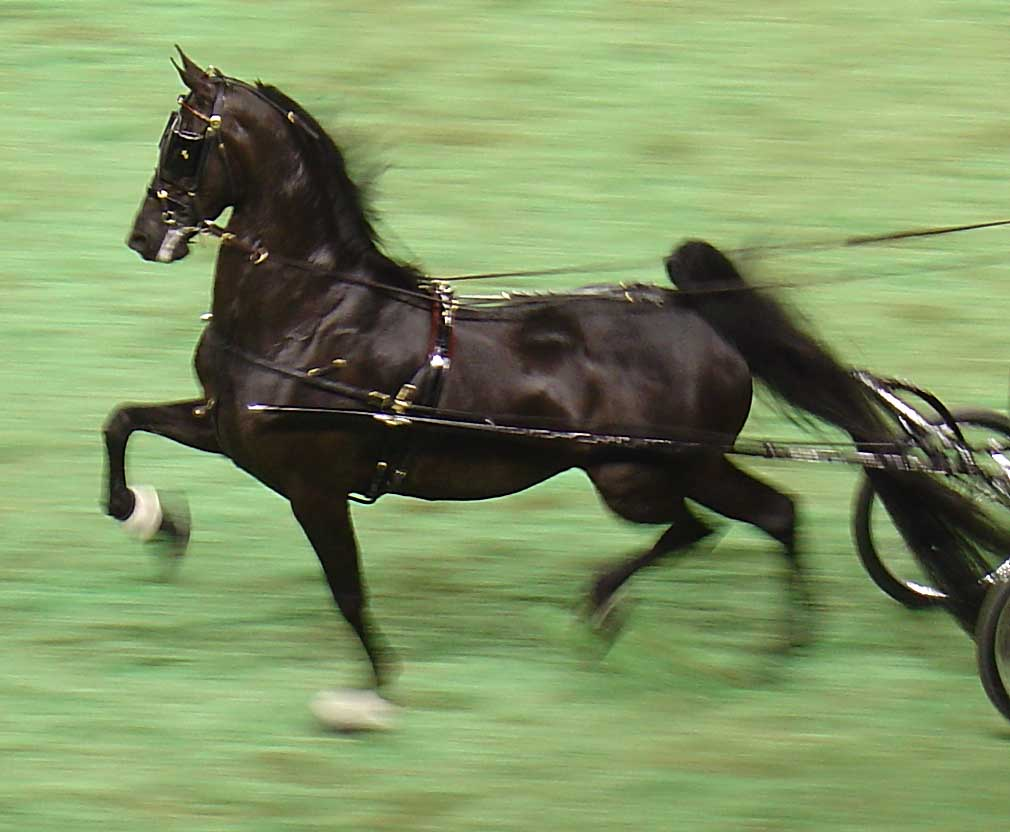
An American Saddlebred in fine harness.

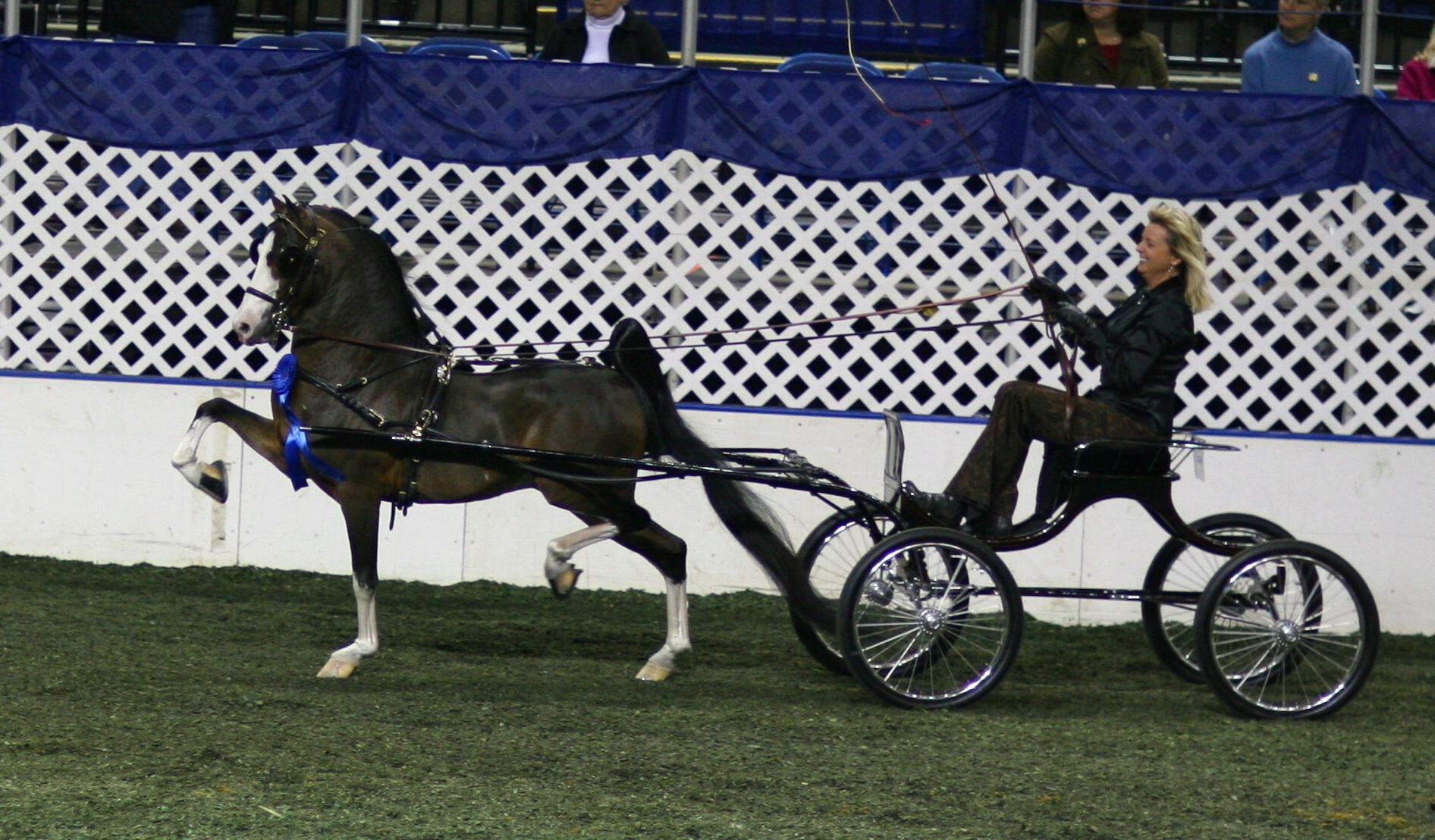
A Hackney pony in the harness pony division, a fine harness event

Fine harness is a type of driving competition seen at horse shows, that features showy horses with high action. It is the driving equivalent to the ridden park horse style and is sometimes called park harness. Breeds that compete in this style include American Saddlebred, Morgan, Arabian, Dutch Harness Horse, Hackney horse, Hackney pony, Welsh, and American Shetland.

The harness used is a light, breastplate type without a horse collar. In this type of design, the horse rides forward against the breastplate, while still retaining a crupper. The cart used is generally a light, four-wheeled design. Drivers wear formal attire.

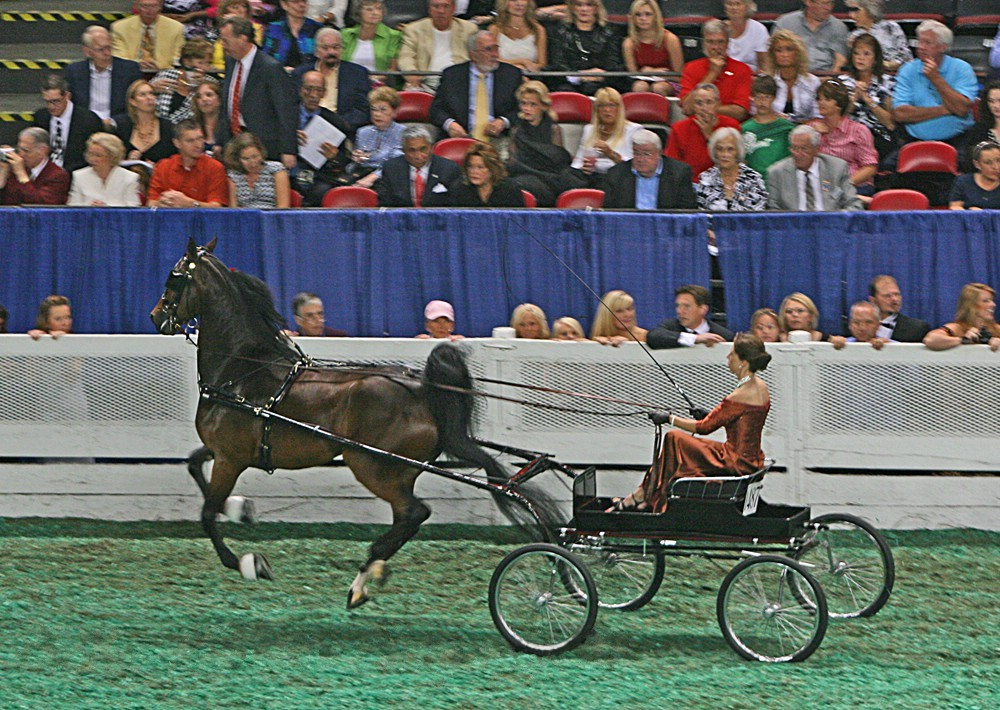
Women drivers may opt to wear a formal gown. Breaking out of a trot into a canter is penalized
