= Quarter Pony =

American breed of horse

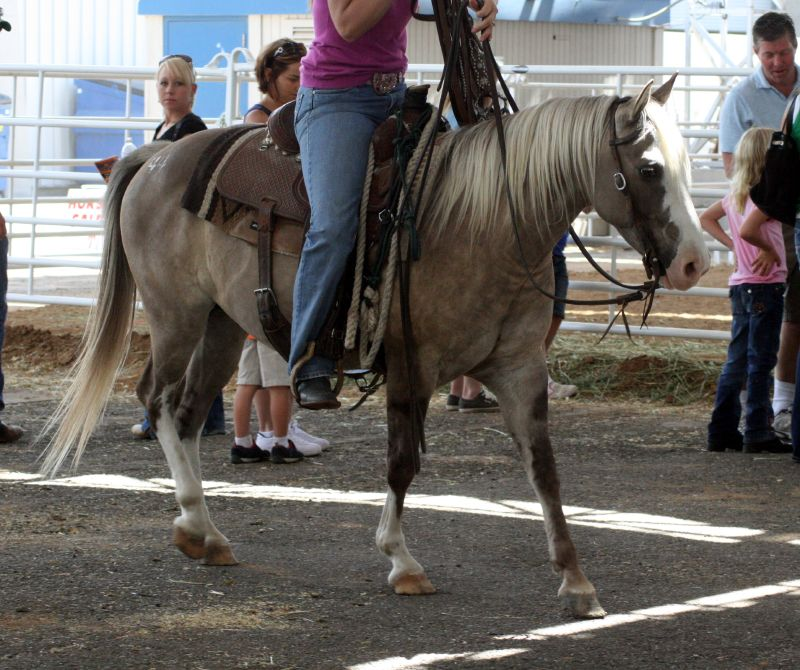
- Country of origin: United States

Breed standards
- International Quarter Pony Association; Quarter Pony Association Australia; Aust. National Quarter Pony Society

The Quarter Pony is a breed of pony that stands up to 14.2 hands (58 inches, 147 cm) high, and was developed from American Quarter Horses that did not meet the height requirement for breed registration. It looks like a small Quarter Horse, although a few of the breed registries also allow crosses with other stock horse breeds such as the Paint horse, Appaloosa and Pony of the Americas.

== Characteristics ==
The Quarter Pony should look like a small American Quarter Horse, focusing on height and conformation. The ponies stand between 11.2 and 14.2 hands (46 and 58 inches, 117 and 147 cm) high. The breed has a short, broad head with small ears and wide-set eyes, set on a slightly arched neck. The shoulders are sloping, the withers sharp, the chest broad and deep. The back is short and the hindquarters broad and deep.

Early registries only accepted solid-colors and non-gaited ponies. Registries have since accepted pinto coloring, Appaloosa-type spotting, and Albino, white and cremello colors.

The International Quarter Pony Association allows pinto and Appaloosa markings, and requires that ponies be of Quarter Horse type conformation and good disposition. Any pony meeting these requirements may be registered through the hardship registration program, which includes a special inspection. However, if ponies have a parent registered with an approved breed registry, they are automatically eligible for registration, with no inspection required. Approved breeds include the Quarter Pony, Quarter Horse, Paint horse, Appaloosa and Pony of the Americas.

== Breed history ==
The Quarter Pony was originally developed from horses that did not meet the American Quarter Horse Association's original height requirement of 14.2 hands (58 inches, 147 cm) high. The AQHA later removed the height requirement, but the Quarter Pony breed continued independently. Breeders and registries encourage known bloodlines from Quarter Horses, but these are not required by all registries.

The Quarter Pony has been recognized by several breed registries. Most will automatically accept ponies from sires and dams registered with one of several Quarter Pony and stock-horse type organizations, (Note: The International Quarter Pony Association automatically accepts ponies whose sire or dam are registered with IQPA, NQPA, AQPA, ApHA, POA, APHA, or AQHA.) (Note: Acceptable ancestry for the Aust. National Quarter Pony Society includes: American Quarter Horse Association, American Quarter Pony Association, Australian Quarter Pony Association, Australian Quarter Horse Association, International Quarter Pony Association, American Appaloosa Association, American Paint Pony Registry, American Paint Horse Association, Australian Appaloosa Association, and Australian Paint Horse Association, with a few exceptions if the pony has more than 25% of other bloodlines.) and—with inspection—those which have stock-horse type conformation even if their breeding is unknown.

The American Quarter Pony Association (AQPA) was begun in 1964 with the ideals of a registry which would register small horses and ponies of western type, whose breeding could be unknown but which were desirable for breeding purposes. Crossbred and purebred animals were eligible for registration, as were those registered with a few other registries.

In 1975, the National Quarter Pony Association (NPQA) was begun to preserve the smaller, stockier type Quarter Horse when breeding trends were leaning towards taller, leaner animals. NPQA required stallions be registered with AQHA and mares to have one parent registered with AQHA.

The International Quarter Pony Association (IQPA) was begun in the 1970s. In 2005, IQPA and the Quarter Pony Association (QPA) became one organization, with IQPA acting as the registry and QPA as the membership branch. IQPA has merged with, or received registry information from, other defunct and shrinking registries including the old IQPA, World Quarter Pony Registry (WQPR), American Paint Pony Registry (APPR), and Australian QPR.

== Uses ==
Quarter Ponies are often used in western riding activities as mounts for children because of their small size, and calm temperament. Larger ponies are more suitable for adult riders and sometimes used for rodeo events such as steer wrestling.
