= German Classic Pony =

German breed of riding pony

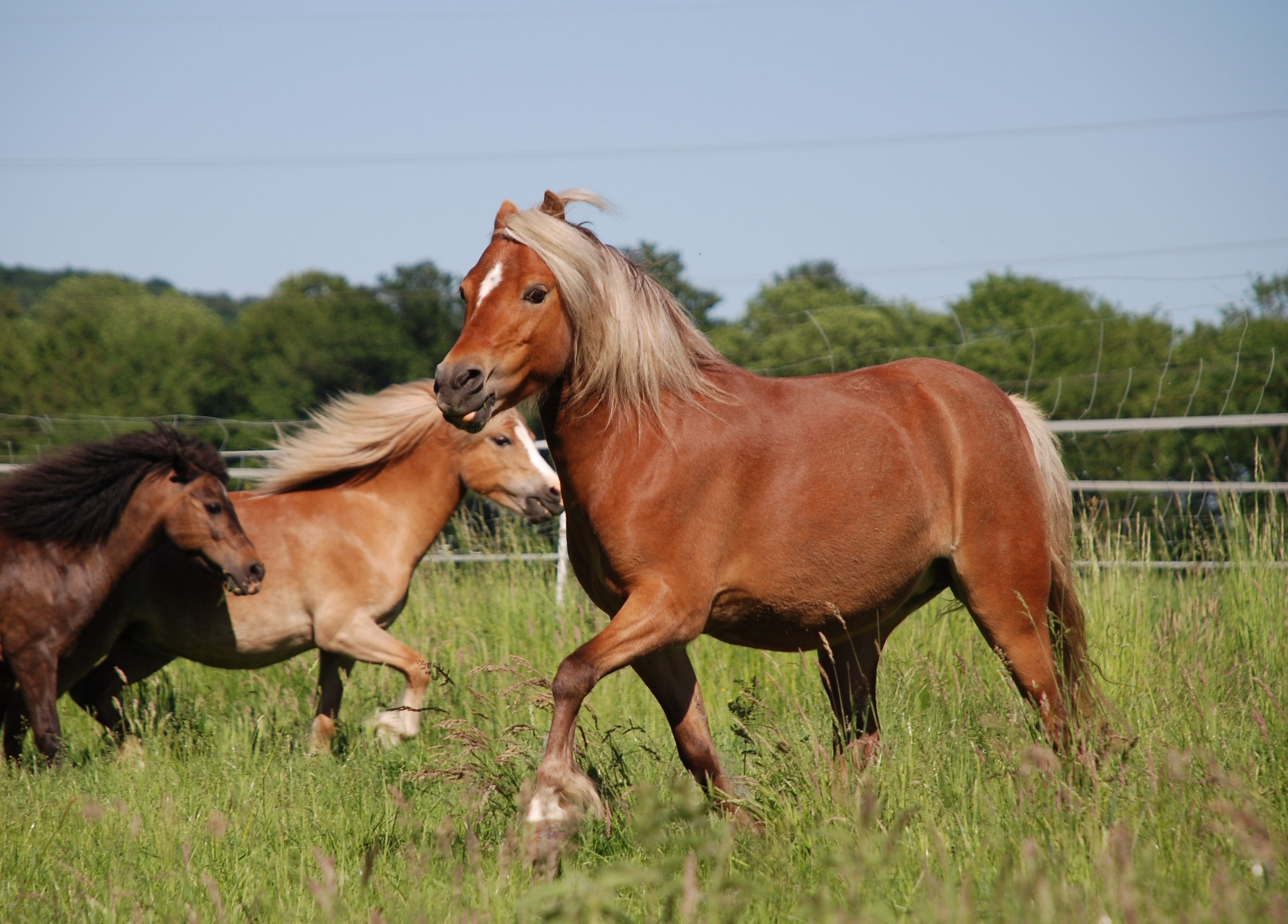

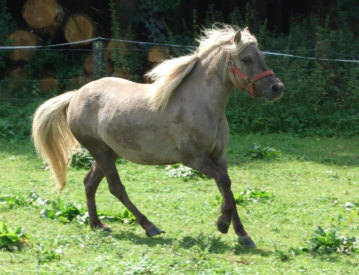
- Conservation status: FAO (2007): endangered; BLE (2017): not endangered; DAD-IS (2024): at risk/critical
- Other names: Deutsches Classic Pony
- Country of origin: Germany
- Distribution: Germany

Traits
- Height: not over 130 cm

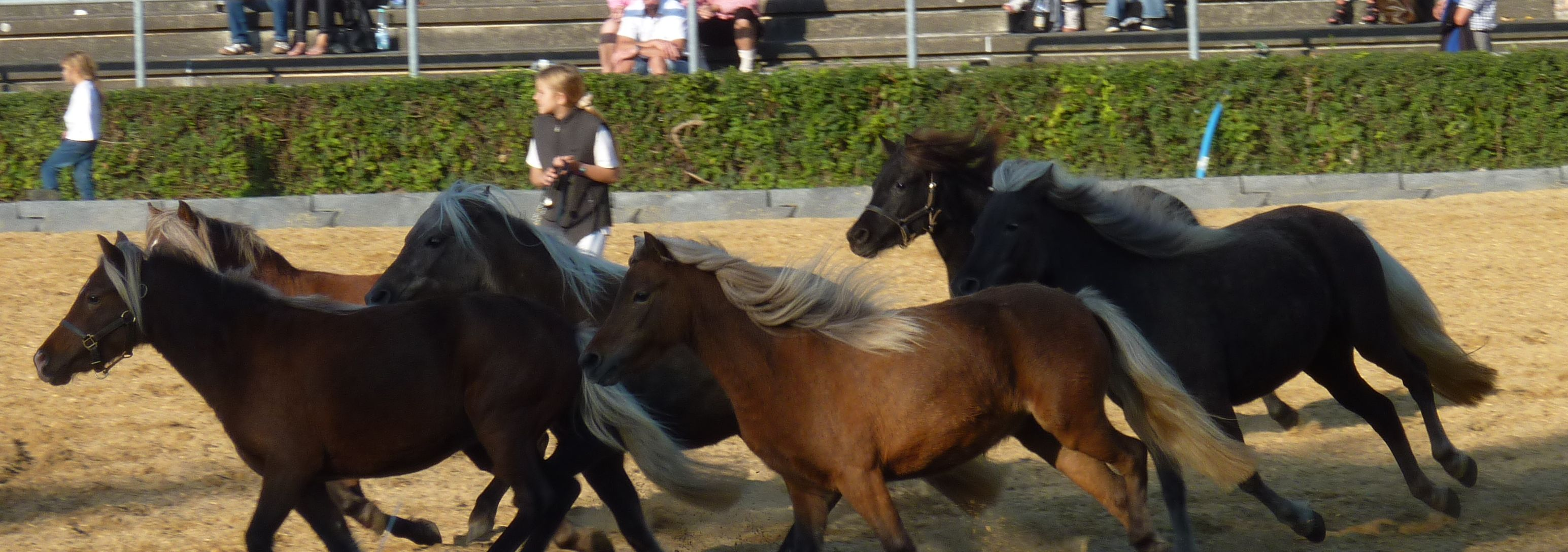
Ponies showing typical colouring

The German Classic Pony or German: Deutsches Classic Pony is a modern German breed of riding pony. It derives from the traditional Shetland Pony of the Scottish Shetland Isles, but is principally influenced by the taller and more elegant American Shetland Pony.

== History ==
From about 1965 breeders in Germany began to selectively breed the traditional Shetland Pony with the taller and more athletic American Shetland Pony, with the aim of creating a more elegant pony better suited to use for riding and driving. The 1961 American champion stallion Jiggs was imported, together with several mares. In the 1990s the Shetland Pony Stud-Book Society declined to register any pony with American bloodlines; the name "Deutsche Shetland Partbred" was proposed for these ponies, but some breeders did not accept it. They formed their own breed society, and the Deutsches Classic Pony was officially recognised as a German breed in 2001.

In 2007 the conservation status of the breed was listed by the FAO as "endangered". In 2017 there were 58 stallions and 337 breeding mares, and the conservation status was listed by the Bundesanstalt für Landwirtschaft und Ernährung as "not endangered". In 2024 it was listed in DAD-IS as "at risk/critical".

== Characteristics ==
While all coat colours are acceptable, the traditional German colours fuchs (flaxen chestnut) and dunkelfuchs (burnt chestnut with flaxen or silver mane) are among the most common.
