= Hackney horse =

Breed of horse

Hackney
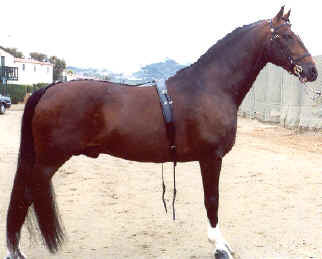

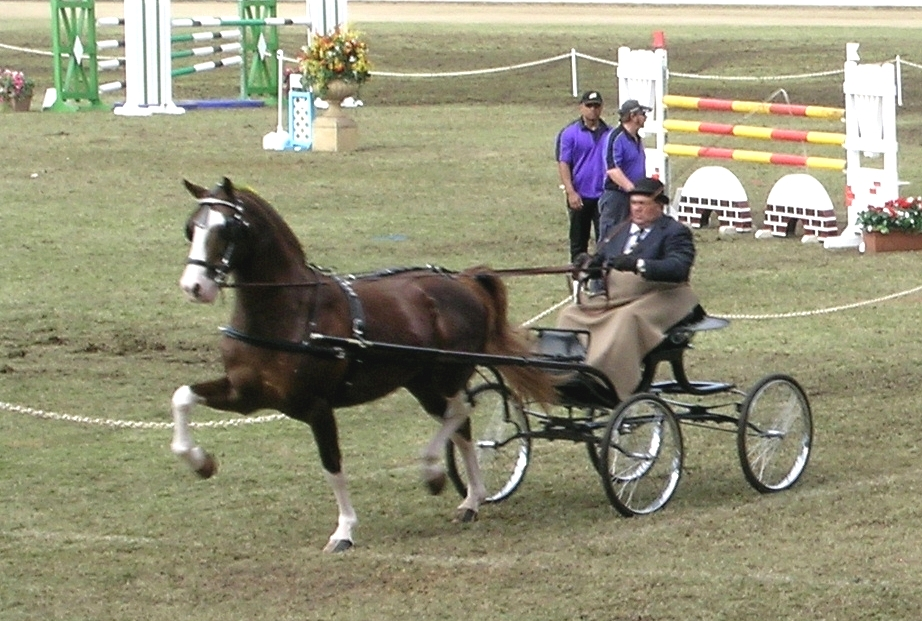
- Country of origin: England

Traits
- Distinguishing features: High-stepping trot, flashy appearance

Breed standards
- Hackney Horse Society; American Hackney Horse Society

The Hackney is a recognized horse breed that was developed in Great Britain. In recent decades, the breeding of the Hackney has been directed toward producing horses that are ideal for carriage driving. They are an elegant high stepping breed of carriage horse that is popular for showing in harness events. Hackneys possess good stamina, and are capable of trotting at high speed for extended periods of time.

== Breed characteristics ==
The Hackney horse is usually 14.2–15.3 hands tall and colored bay, brown, chestnut, or black. The Hackney has a well-shaped head, sometimes with a slightly convex nose. Their eyes and ears are expressive and should show alertness. The neck is crested and muscular with a clean cut throat and jaw. The chest is broad and well-defined, the shoulder is powerful, long and gently sloping. The Hackneys have an average length of back, muscular, level croups, and powerful hindquarters. Their ribs are well-sprung. The tail is set high and carried high naturally. The legs are strong with broad, clean joints, long forearms and gaskins, with strong hocks, and pasterns medium in length, and are attached to round, fairly upright hooves.

In the trot, they exhibit showiness and an exaggerated high knee and hock action due to very good flexion of their joints. Their action should be straight and true, with a distinct moment of suspension. The front legs reach up high with sharply bent knees that are stretched well forward with a ground covering stride. Their hind legs are well-propelled underneath them in a similar exaggerated action. In addition to inherent soundness and endurance, the Hackney horse has proven to be a breed with an easy, rhythmic canter, and a brisk, springy walk.

== Breed history ==
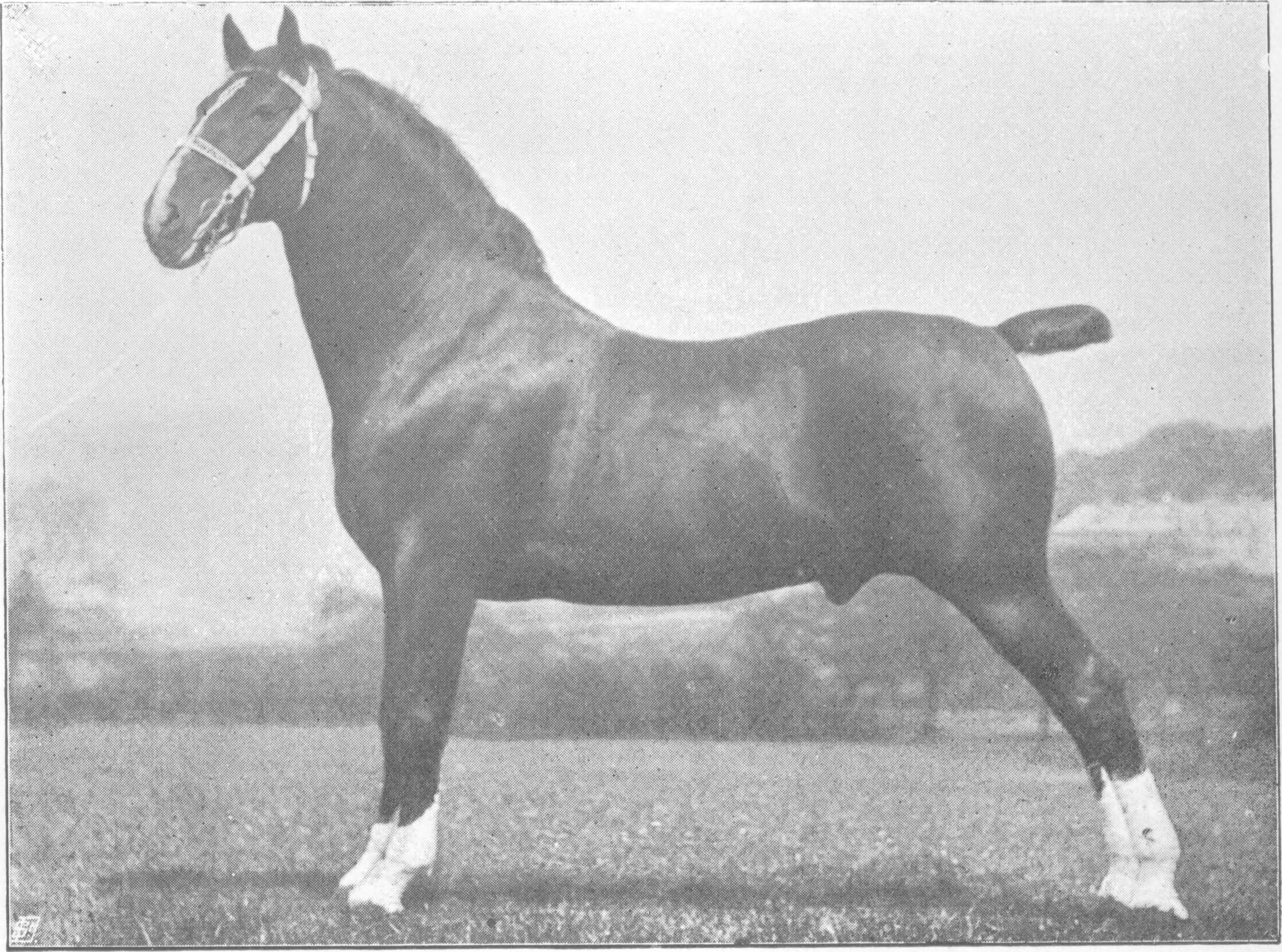
Hackney stallion Ganymede (1897)

The Hackney horse breed was established in England. Predecessors of the breed included the Norfolk Trotter, also called the Norfolk Roadster, and the Yorkshire Coach Horse According to Hayes, the early hackney types were robust cob-type horses that were both ridden and driven, and the Norfolk Trotters contributed great speed to the type. Hackneys were out-crossed with Thoroughbreds and evolved into the modern high-stepping light carriage horse of today.

After at least 50 years of breeding the hackney type in England, in 1883 the Hackney Stud Book Society (now called Hackney Horse Society) was formed in Norwich, formalizing the breed. The American Hackney Horse Society was established in 1891 by Alexander Cassatt and other hackney enthusiasts.

The Hackney pony is a breed distinct from the Hackney horse. It was developed in the late 19th century.

As of 2026, the UK Rare Breeds Survival Trust lists the Hackney as "priority", the highest level of at-risk. In 2022, they declared the breed was "at risk", with just 31 breeding females amongst 12 breeders left in the UK in 2021, down from 300 breeding females in 2011.
