= Kishie =

Traditional Shetland basket

An etching print of a kishie, from Thomas Edmondston's An etymological glossary of the Shetland & Orkney dialect

A kishie (Shaetlan pronunciation: [ˈke̞ʃi] KISH-ee) is a type of pack basket native to the Shetland Islands. They are traditionally constructed using locally available plant materials, most commonly Shetland black oats and soft rushes. They were designed to be carried on a person's back - or to be fitted as pack saddles onto ponies - for the transportation of peats, fish and other goods. Smaller and larger variants for hanging on a wall, or for sitting on the ground were produced for different purposes. Shetland women in particular were noted for their ability to carry a burden in a kishie while walking and knitting simultaneously.

While once a ubiquitous part of the traditional Shetland crofting and fishing lifestyle, industrialisation and the rise in use of modern synthetic fibres has resulted in the declining use and production of kishies. The Heritage Crafts Association classify kishie making as a critically endangered craft.

== Etymology ==
The Shaetlan word kishie comes via Norn from Old Norse kass(i) meaning "basket". In Orkney and Caithness this type of basket is known as a cassie.

== Construction ==
Typical kishies are either wedge-shaped with an oval opening, or cone-shaped with a circular opening. The style and construction across the area in which they were produced was fairly homogeneous.

A kishie is constructed using two distinct elements: the hjogs are the vertical stakes, and are created by the bundling and twisting of the desired hjog material; while the simmens are generally 2-ply twisted cordage used to fasten the hjogs together. The material for the hjogs include gloy: cleaned Shetland aet (black oat) straw; or dockens (dock) which are dried and then soaked before use. The simmens may be made from floss (compact rushes or common rushes), gloy, or bent (marram grass). Making a standard sized kishie would require 30 hjogs and around 22 fathoms (40 metres) of simmens.

If made to be carried on the back, a kishie baand would be affixed. Unlike a modern backpack, this consists of a single rope that is worn across the chest horizontally. This allows the contents to be unloaded by tipping the kishie quickly up over the head. If loaded with items exceeding the height of the opening, the goods could be tied down using a rippeen baand made of simmens to stop them falling out.

Kishies were never produced on a commercial basis, being produced only for use within a household or croft. The durability of those used outdoors for general use was typically limited to a few years, whereas those used seasonally or indoors could last far longer.

== Related types ==
- A büddie is a lower and wider type of kishie of a bulged shape that would still be of a size suitable for carrying over the back, and could be made of oat straw (a mill büddie) or dock (a fysh büddie, docken büddie or sea büddie). Those made from dock would see use where the contents of the kishie would be wet, e.g. fish, shellfish or seaweed. Dried dock would be less absorbent than other common hjog materials making them less liable to rot, and gaps between the hjogs would allow water to drain out. A sillik büddie was taken to the craigs - shoreline fishing spots
  - An anker büddie is used to store potatoes.
  - A tülie büddie features different compartments for the storing of tools.
- A cuddie is a very small size of kishie commonly used for storing salt (a saat cuddie), and would typically be hung near the fire in a traditional crofthouse.
  - A limpet cuddie is used to store limpets used as bait for fishing from the shore. They are typically about 9×6 inches.
  - A taatie cuddie is used to store potatoes, typically about 1½ bucket's worth. They feature an open weave to let soil fall through, and have two short handles.
  - A saat cuddie is used to store salt and would typically be hung near the fire in a traditional croft house.
- A kilpik is a small dock or twig basket made to be carried in the hand fitted with a looped handle.
- A maeshie is an oblong flat mat made with handles at either end to facilitate carrying hay, corn, and other produce by forming an open pannier.
- A rivvie is a shallow and wide version of a kishie.
- A skeb is a large kishie used for holding straw in a barn.
- A skoo is a large flat basket that herring are placed into once gutted.
- A toig is a coiled basket often with a raised centre for holding meal, eggs, balls of wool, or fruit. The raised centre would hinder round objects from rolling at once.

== History ==
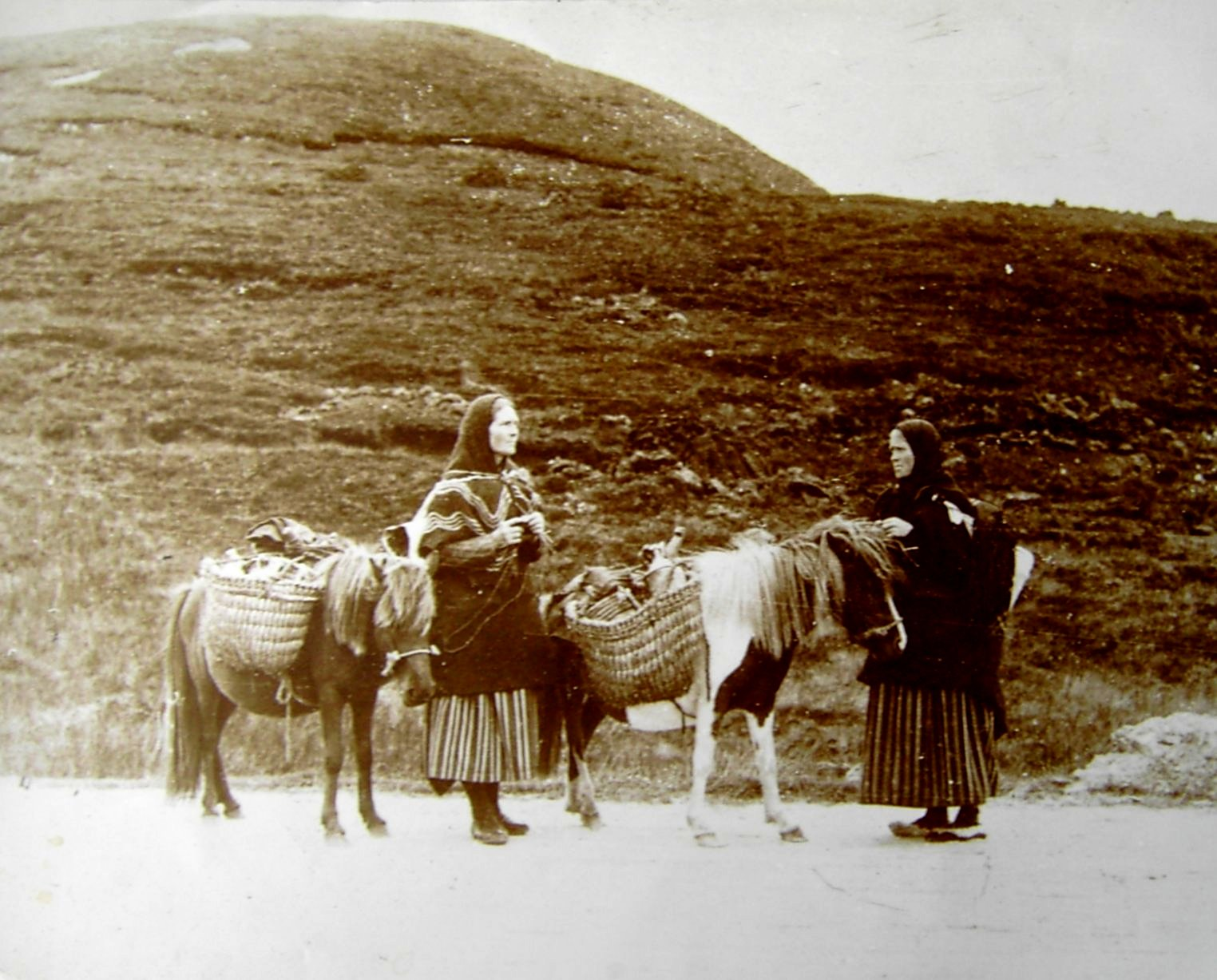
Two Shetland women carrying kishies, with ponies also carrying kishies. Note the knitting held by the woman on the left.

What was described in local media as a kishie made from heather was discovered during archaeological excavations at Old Scatness. Dated to the Iron Age, it was preserved due to having been burned.

Kishies would have been used for many household, crofting and fishing purposes requiring the transport of goods. Kishies predate the common use of wheelbarrows in Shetland.

=== Decline ===
By the 1920s it was being remarked that few young people knew how to make kishies. At an arts and crafts exhibition held in Lerwick in the spring of 1946, the basketwork category only received a single entry, and it was noted that "The number of entries in this section [is] very disappointing."

Around 2020, only around 6 people were known to be growing Shetland aets, consisting of approximately ¼ acre of crop across the whole of Shetland. Factors for its declining active cultivation include the lower yield from Shetland aets compared to other crops, meaning they are only grown by e.g. those interested in kishie making, which does not have commercial incentive.

=== Revival ===
Newspaper reports from the early 1980s describe Lowrie Copland of Skelberry, North Roe giving demonstrations of kishie making, and subsequently he began to teach classes on the subject. He would go on to demonstrate the process in a film which was made available on DVD.

At an event held in 2022 at the Shetland Museum and Archives relating to Shetland's traditional straw crafts, 90 members of the public attended.

In 2026 an estimate of the number of growers of Shetland aets in Shetland was approximately 26, an increase of 20 from 2020.

== See also ==
- Basket weaving
- Leypur - the Faroese wooden creel
- Fair Isle chair
- Orkney chair
- Crofting
- Thatching
