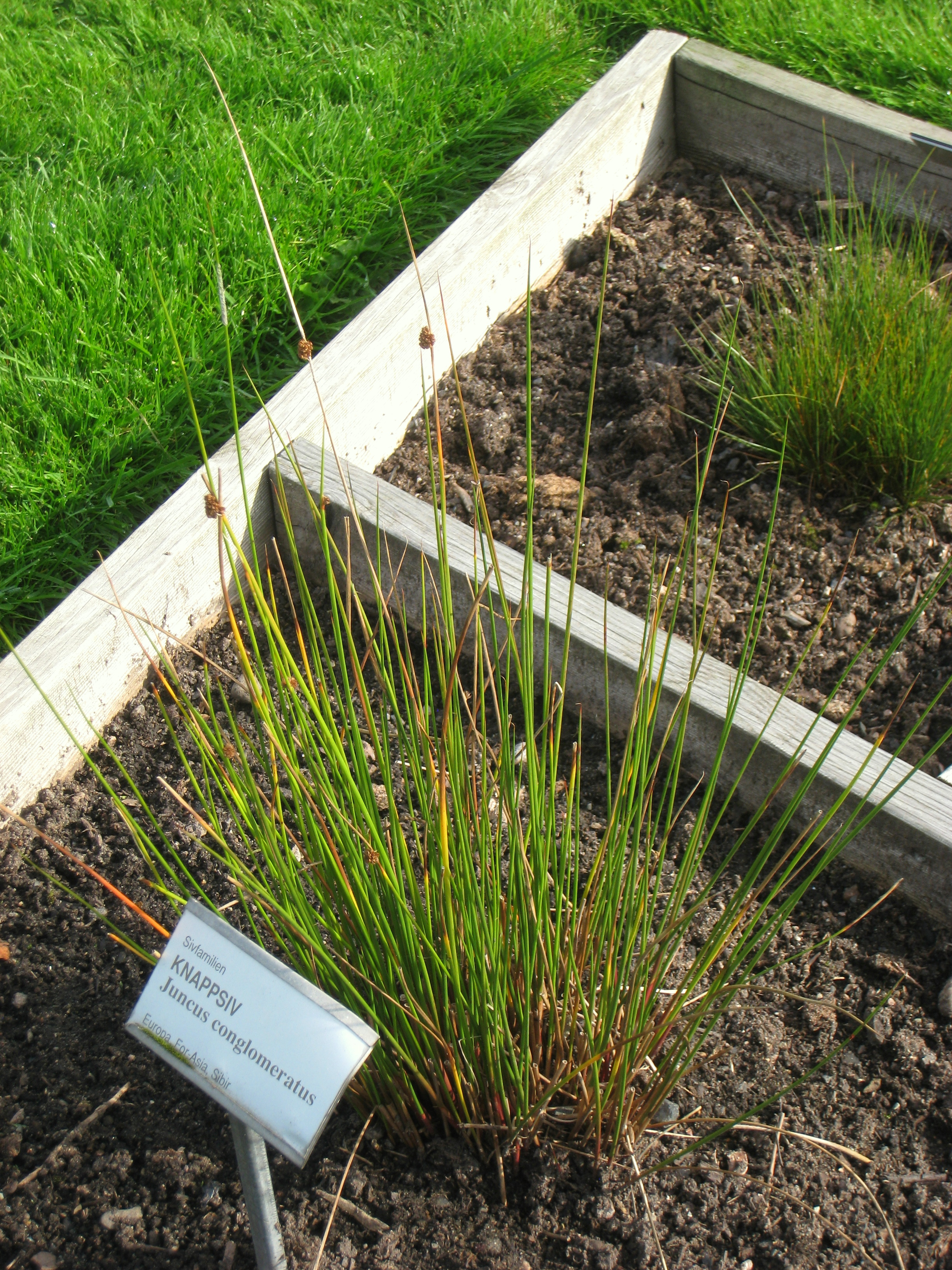

Conservation status
- Least Concern (IUCN 3.1)

Scientific classification
- Kingdom: Plantae
- Clade: Tracheophytes
- Clade: Angiosperms
- Clade: Monocots
- Clade: Commelinids
- Order: Poales
- Family: Juncaceae
- Genus: Juncus
- Species: J. conglomeratus

Binomial name
- Juncus conglomeratus L.

Synonyms
- Juncus leersii T.Marsson; Juncus matthioli Bubani; Juncus subuliflorus Drejer; Juncus effusus var. conglomeratus (L.) Engelm.

= Juncus conglomeratus =

Compact Rush

Species of rush

Juncus conglomeratus, the compact rush, is a perennial, herbaceous flowering plant species in the rush family Juncaceae.

In the British Isles it is one of six rush species that can dominate lowland damp grasslands. In New Zealand, its habitats include lake margins, roadside drains and wet pastures.

== Distribution ==
The species' geographical range includes the northwestern corners of Africa, almost all of Europe and the Caucasus region. It has been introduced and has become wild in Australia, New Zealand and North America.

== Description ==
Juncus conglomeratus forms large, dense tufts up to 1.2 m high with a dense bundle of roots.

Its stems are awl-shaped, stalked, vivid green, partially filled with a core (continuous, uninterrupted core), wrapped at the base (below ground level) with scaly brown leaf sheaths. The stems beneath the inflorescence are ribbed, while in the similar Scattered rush (Juncus effusius) they are smooth.

The plant's leaves are exclusively abaxial, stalk-like.

The Inflorescence is a spherical head, about 1 cm long. Appears lateral because at the base a bract grows as an extension of the stem.

The flower is small, 2-2.5 mm long, perianth - rust-colored, stamens count ranges from 3-6. Blooms from June to August.

The fruit forms a capsule, with a small beak at the tip, length ranging from 1.5–3.2 mm.

Seeds are small (up to 0.3 mm long), dark brown, egg-shaped oblong, laterally flattened, pointed at the end, dull. The weight of 1000 seeds is 0.01 g.

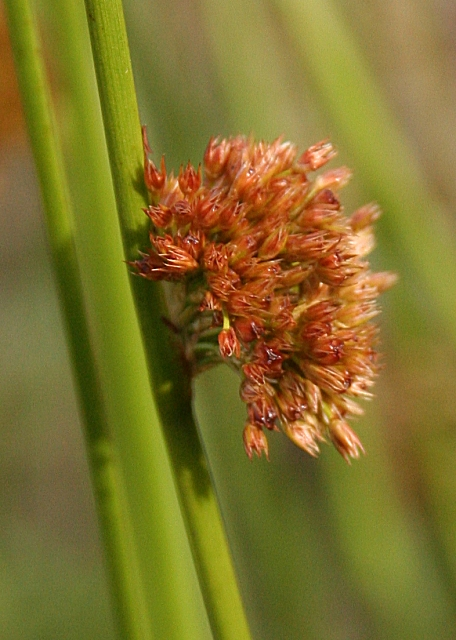
Close-up of inflorescence

== Variability ==
It has been observed to hybridize with Juncus effusus, Juncus inflexus and Juncus filiformis.
