= List of Brazilian horse breeds =

This is a list of the breeds of horse considered in Brazil to be of Brazilian origin. Some may have complex or obscure histories, so inclusion here does not necessarily imply that a breed is predominantly or exclusively Brazilian.

- Baixadeiro^{[1]}^{[6]}
- Brazilian Sport Horse or Brasileiro de Hipismo^{[1]}^{[5]}^{[6]}
- Campolina^{[1]}^{[5]}^{[6]}
- Campeiro^{[1]}^{[5]}^{[6]}
- Crioulo^{[1]}^{[5]}^{[6]}
- Lavradeiro^{[1]}^{[5]}^{[6]}
- Mangalarga^{[1]}^{[5]}^{[6]} or Mangalarga Paulista
- Mangalarga Marchador^{[1]}^{[5]}^{[6]}
- Marajoara^{[1]}^{[5]}^{[6]}
- Nordestino^{[1]}^{[5]}^{[6]}
- Pantaneiro^{[1]}^{[5]}^{[6]}
- Pampa^{[3]}
- Piquira^{[1]}^{[2]}^{[6]}
- Puruca^{[1]}^{[5]}^{[6]}
