= Piquira =

Brazilian breed of horse

- Conservation status: FAO (2007): not listed; DAD-IS (2026): not at risk
- Country of origin: Brazil
- Standard: Associação Brasileira dos Criadores do Cavalo Pônei (in Portuguese)
- Use: riding

Traits
- Weight: Male: 180 kg; Female: 160 kg
- Height: Male: 122 cm; Female: 120 cm
- Colour: any but pseudo-albino

The Piquira or Piquira Pônei is a Brazilian breed of small horse or pony. It is one of the thirteen horse breeds recognised as Brazilian by the Empresa Brasileira de Pesquisa Agropecuária, the national organisation for agricultural research, and is one of the four marcha breeds – horses which perform ambling gaits instead of a trot – of Brazil; the others are the Campolina, the Mangalarga Marchador and the Pampa.

== History ==
A general breed society for ponies in Brazil – the Associação Brasileira dos Criadores dos Cavalos Piquira e Pônei – was formed in 1970, and a stud-book for the Piquira was started in the same year; the name of the society was later changed to Associação Brasileira dos Criadores do Cavalo Pônei.

The conservation status of the Piquira was not listed by the Food and Agriculture Organization of the United Nations in its publication The State of the World's Animal Genetic Resources for Food and Agriculture in 2007. In 2026 the breed was listed in the DAD-IS database as 'not at risk', based on a total population reported for 2024 of 34175, with 22573 brood-mares and 11602 active stallions.

== Characteristics ==
The Piquira is a small horse or pony. The height at the withers should be in the range 115 to 128 cm for mares and 115 to 130 cm for stallions and geldings, with average heights of 120 cm and 122 cm respectively; the corresponding average body weights are 160 kg and 180 kg. The coat may be of any colour or pattern other than pseudo-albino; horses with unpigmented eyes or unpigmented skin are not eligible for registration.

Like the other marcha ('ambling') breeds of Brazil – the Campolina, the Mangalarga Marchador and the Pampa – the Piquira does not trot but instead performs either of two types of marcha – the marcha batida and the marcha picada – in both of which (unlike the trot and the pace) hoof contact with the ground is maintained at all times. In the marcha batida pairs of hooves in contact with the ground at the same time are usually diagonally opposed, with a mean interval between footfalls of about 0.19 s. The marcha picada is a lateral gait, with the pairs of hooves in contact usually on the same side of the horse; the mean interval between contacts is shorter, at about 0.12 s. Some three-point contacts occur in both gaits.
