= List of gaited horse breeds =

Gaited horses are horse breeds that have selective breeding for natural gaited tendencies, that is, the ability to perform one of the smooth-to-ride, intermediate speed, four-beat horse gaits, collectively referred to as ambling gaits.

In most "gaited" breeds, an ambling gait is a hereditary trait. This mutation may be a dominant gene, in that even one copy of the mutated allele will produce gaitedness. However, some representatives of these breeds may not always gait. Conversely, some naturally trotting breeds not listed above may have ambling or "gaited" ability, particularly with specialized training. Many horses can both trot and amble, and some horses pace in addition to the amble, instead of trotting. However, pacing in gaited horses is often, though not always, discouraged, though the gene that produces gaitedness appears to also produce pacing ability. Some horses do not naturally trot or pace easily, they prefer their ambling gait for their standard intermediate speed. A mutation on the gene DMRT3, which controls the spinal neurological circuits related to limb movement and motion, causes a "premature 'stop codon'" in horses with lateral ambling gaits.

Such breeds include the following:

- Aegidienberger
- American Saddlebred
- Campeiro
- Campolina
- Florida Cracker Horse
- Garrano
- Icelandic horse
- Kathiawari
- Mangalarga Marchador
- Marwari horse
- Messara horse
- Missouri Fox Trotter
- Mongolian Horse
- Morgan horse
- Mountain Pleasure Horse
- Narragansett Pacer (extinct)
- Nordestino
- North American Single-Footing Horse
- Pampa
- Paso Fino
- Peruvian Paso
- Racking Horse
- Rocky Mountain Horse
- Spotted Saddle Horse
- Tennessee Walking Horse
- Walkaloosa

== See also ==
- Ambling, specifically describes various four beat intermediate gaits performed by gaited breeds
- Horse gait, overview of all horse gaits
- List of horse breeds
- The Gaited Horse (magazine)
