= Pampa Horse =

Brazilian breed of horse

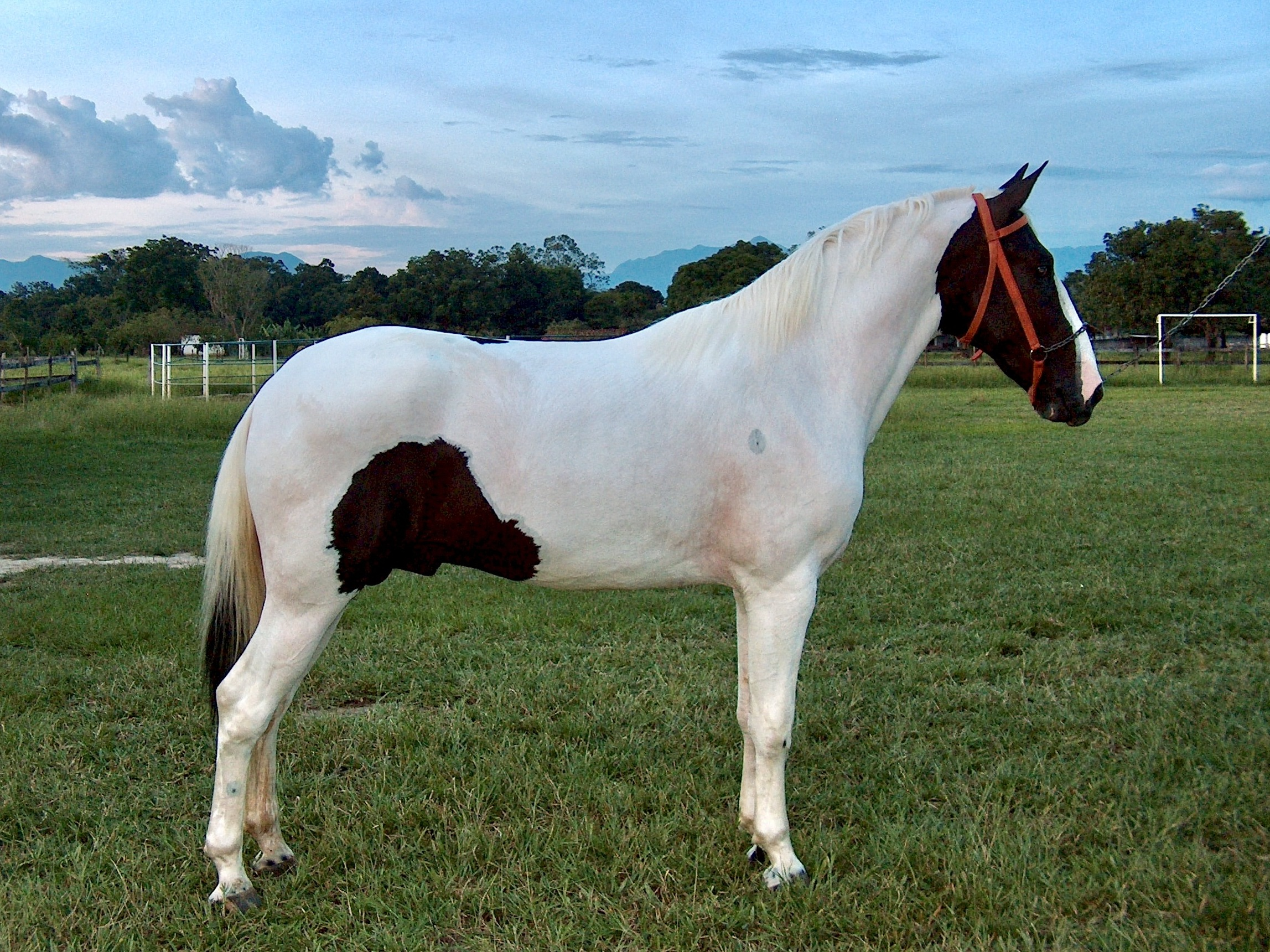
- A pinto or 'pampa' Campolina stallion
- Conservation status: FAO (2007): not listed; DAD-IS (2026): not listed
- Other names: Pampa
- Country of origin: Brazil
- Standard: Associação Brasileira dos Criadores do Cavalo Pampa (in Portuguese)

Traits
- Height: 140–147 cm
- Colour: pinto

The Pampa Horse is a Brazilian breed of riding, sport and working horse. It combines the conformational characteristics of Brazilian Horses that are gaited with a pinto spotting pattern of white and dark coat colors. Developed from a base of spotted horses of the Mangalarga Marchador, Campolina, Brazilian crossbred horses, and others. It is a color breed: only pinto horses may be registered. It is not reported to the DAD-IS database of the Food and Agriculture Organization of the United Nations, nor is it among the thirteen horse breeds recognised as Brazilian by the Empresa Brasileira de Pesquisa Agropecuária, the national organisation for agricultural research.

== History ==
As the Pampa is a spotted breed of Brazilian horse, its history begins with the introduction of this coat color pattern in Brazil. Though there is no record of a precise date for the arrival of these types of horses, it is believed that the color pattern was introduced with the first horses brought by Spanish settlers to South America (such as the Andalusian horse and Jaca Navarra), which is also where breeds such as the Criollo and Campeiro originated). The pattern may have been introduced with a few horses of Barb horse origin brought by Portuguese settlers, or by horses from Holland brought to north-eastern Brazil during the Dutch invasion in and after 1629.

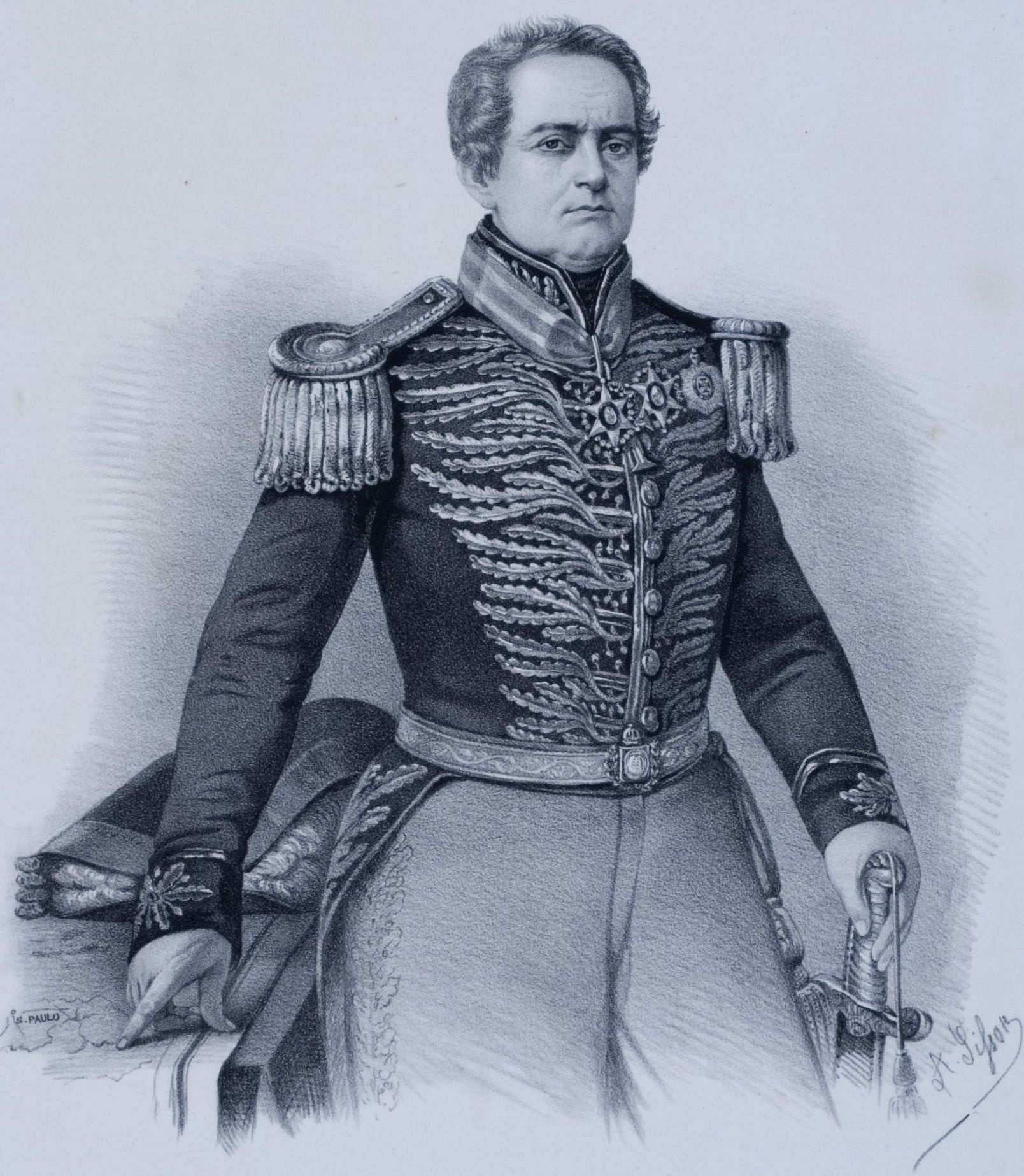
Brigadier Rafael Tobias de Aguiar, who originated and popularized the names Pampa and Tobiano

The origin of the Pampa horse name and Tobiano coat color come from the same man, the Brazilian Brigadier and horse breeder Rafael Tobias de Aguiar, who bred pinto horses in the mid-19th century.

Brigadier Rafael Tobias de Aguiar led the Liberal Revolution in Brazil, along with Father Diogo Antônio Feijó combatting the rise of the Conservatives during the early reign of Dom Pedro II. He was defeated by the imperial forces in the Sorocaba province, and fled with his army and his horses to Rio Grande do Sul, to join the rebels of the Ragamuffin War. However, six months after having fled the Sorocaba province, Tobias was arrested in Palmeira das Missões and taken to the Laje Fortress, in Rio de Janeiro.

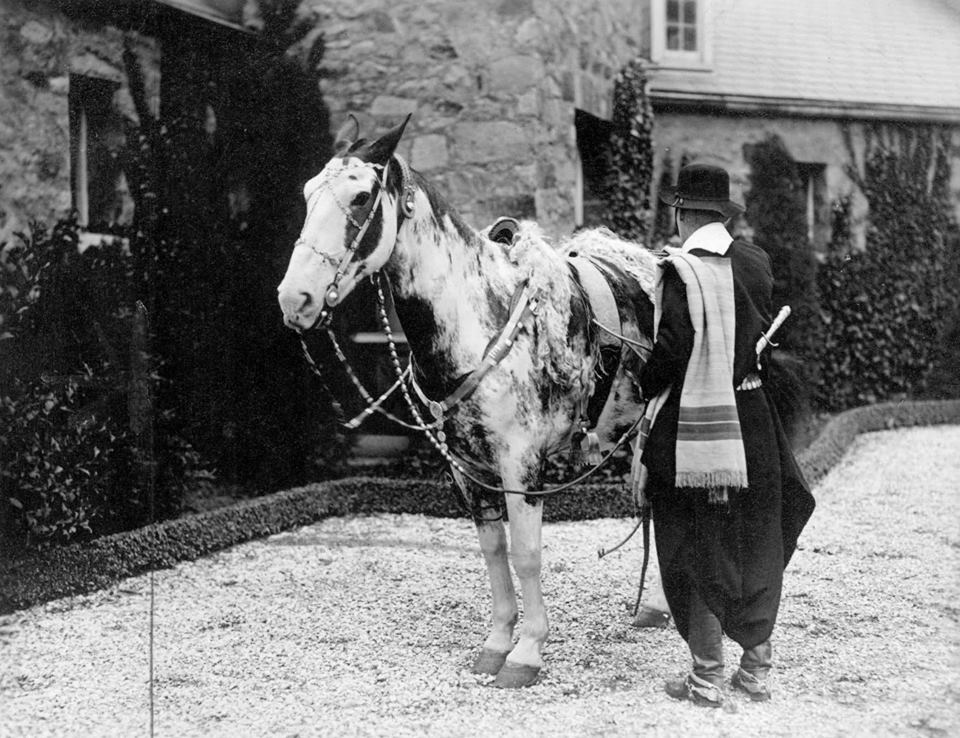
Aimé Félix Tschiffely and Mancha, a Criollo Overo of the "Pampas" in the middle of the journey starting from Buenos Aires until New York City

Tobiano

Tobias, in his passage through Rio Grande do Sul, presented a gaúcho farmer of Cruz Alta with one of his spotted horses, and because of that and the fact that he passed through the towns and villages of the Rio Grande do Sul with his spotted horses, the horses of this type became known in this region as Tobias' horses, which eventually evolved into "Tobian" Horses, or Cavalos Tobianos, and this denomination eventually made its way throughout South America all the way to North America.

When the pinto horses of the soldiers that accompanied the Brigadier returned to São Paulo, they became gradually known throughout the country as the horses of the Pampas, the predominant biome of Rio Grande do Sul (occupying about 63% of the state territory), where Tobias fled.

The same man ended up being responsible for both denominations, even if not intentionally: While traveling from São Paulo to Rio Grande do Sul with his horses, he ended up spreading the "Pampa" name, since the horses were originary from the Pampa biome in Rio Grande do Sul. The "Tobiano" name appeared almost simultaneously, due to the direct association made between the breed and the Brigadier himself, who always traveled with his personal stud of Pampa horses.

A breed association, the Associação Brasileira dos Criadores de Cavalo Pampa, was formed in 1993.

== Characteristics ==
The Pampa horse can only be registered based on certain physical characteristics, not only on color.

There are separate accounts that cite an Argentinian horse of the pampas that had small stature. This breed, however, was not Brazilian-bred from a stock brought by the Spaniards to the colonies. One of the detailed descriptions stated that this breed had "intelligent and fiery eyes, clean legs, round feet, and well-set sloping shoulders, long pasterns, and silky manes and tails." It is said to be prized for its size and endurance. There are documents that describe how this horse performed well in the plains but will struggle in the mountain country. Nevertheless, historical records show that despite its build, the horse was noted for its speed and endurance.
