= The Gaited Horse =

The Gaited Horse Magazine is a defunct international magazine catering to people interested in gaited horses. Originally based in tiny Elk, Washington, it soon moved to the small town of Deer Park, Washington. The magazine was co-founded in 1997 by Rhonda Hart (later Rhonda Hart Poe, now Rhonda Massingham Hart), an author of multiple horse, garden, and how-to books, Alyson Stockham, a Peruvian Paso horse breeder, and Becky Turner, a freelance artist and sculptor, who left in the early days of the magazine to pursue her artistry.

== Issues ==
Issues were published quarterly. Issues of the magazine offered guest-written articles by well known experts in the field, such as Lee Zeigler (author of Easy Gaited Horses), and Liz Graves, an expert horse trainer and clinician who specializes in gaited horses.

== Controversy ==
The Gaited Horse covered several controversial issues in the horse world, such as soring, the illegal practice of intentionally harming horses in order to affect their gaits. The biggest controversy at the time seemed to be battling the notion many non-gaited horse people had that horses had to be forced to gait (via methods such as soring). Most of the magazine was dedicated to showcasing naturally gaited horses.

== End of publication ==
After a decade in the business, the magazine folded in 2007, due mostly to lack of subscription sales and advertising, in spite of being popular mostly in the Southern United States and Europe. The magazine published a "Sunset issue" as a way of saying goodbye. The Sunset issue was the most successful to date.

A few copies of back issues are still available, including the Sunset issue, and another very popular issue about Elvis Presley's horses. However, the print version of The Gaited Horse magazine has not existed since 2007. Unfortunately, someone picked up the magazine's original website address after the publication ceased. As of July 23, 2020, the original creators of The Gaited Horse magazine discovered that this imitator is using copyrighted material from the original magazine (including the logo, website copy and various articles) without their knowledge or consent, and are endeavoring to correct this unauthorized use of their work. This new version has no affiliation with the original magazine, The Gaited Horse, or with any of its founders.

Rhonda Hart is still writing. Alyson Stockham still breeds Peruvian Pasos, as well as a breed she invented called the Fox-Uvian, a Missouri Fox Trotter/Peruvian Paso cross. Becky Turner still practices her art.
