= Marajoara (disambiguation) =

The Marajoara or Marajó culture was an ancient pre-Columbian era civilization.

Marajoara may also refer to:

- Something from, or related to, the island of Marajó
- Marajoara gulf, a bay
- Operation Marajoara, a 1970s guerrilla counter-operation
- Marajoara (horse), a Brazilian horse breed
- A seldom used name for Curatella americana
