= Pantaneiro (horse breed) =

Brazilian breed of horse

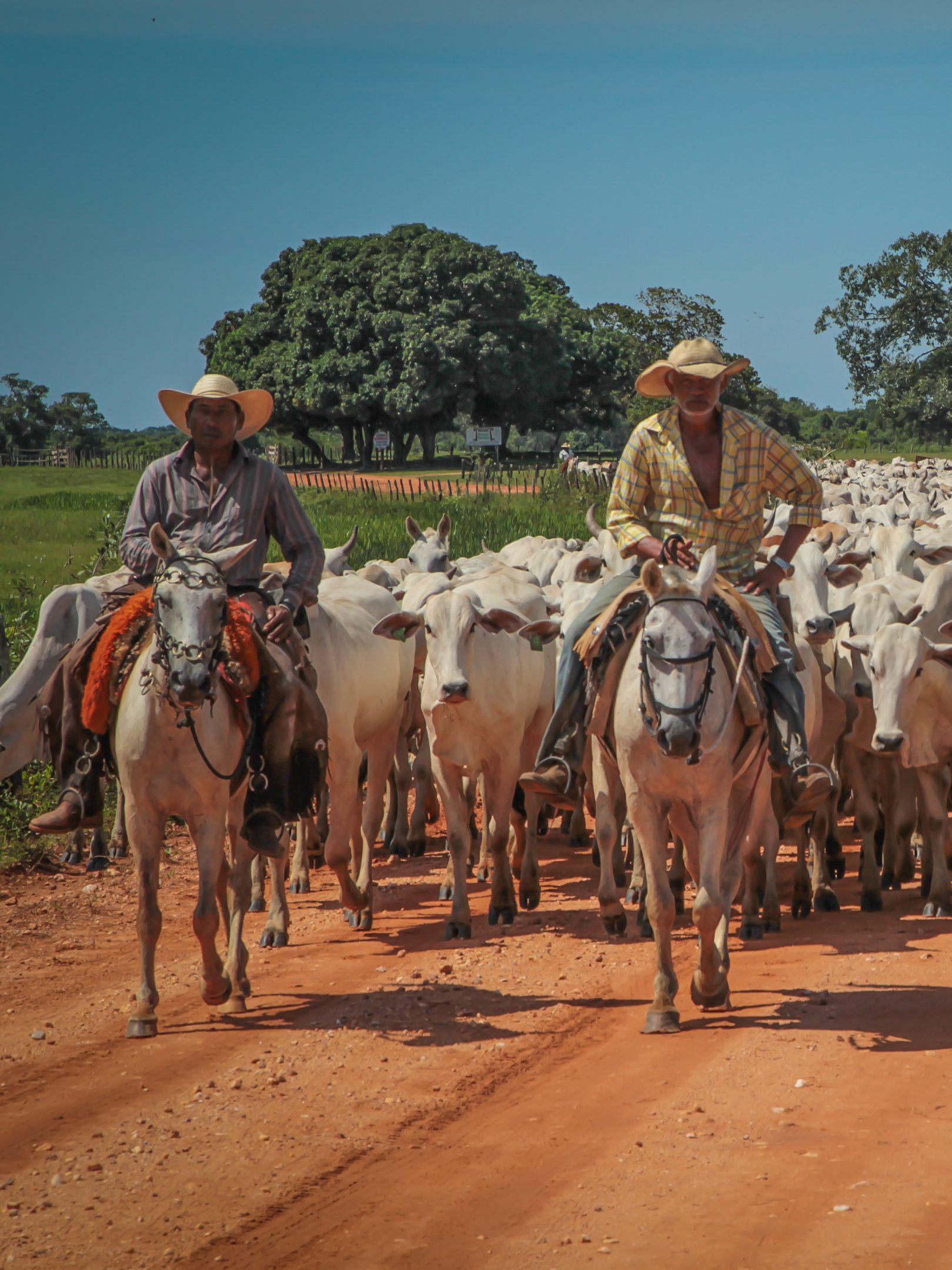
- Conservation status: FAO (2007): not at risk; DAD-IS (2026): not at risk
- Other names: Mimoseano; Poconeano; Bahiano
- Country of origin: Brazil
- Distribution: Pantanal, Mato Grosso do Sul
- Standard: Associação Brasileira De Criadores De Cavalo Pantaneiro (in Portuguese)
- Use: riding; cattle work

Traits
- Weight: Male: 360 kg; Female: 340 kg
- Height: Male: 142 cm; Female: 137 cm
- Colour: any but albino

The Pantaneiro is a Brazilian breed of small horse of Colonial Spanish or Iberian type. It is native to the extensive wetlands of the Pantanal, which lie mainly in the Mato Grosso do Sul region of western Brazil and are flooded for much of the year. The name of the breed derives from that of the wetland area; other names for it are Mimoseano, Poconeano and Bahiano. It is one of the thirteen horse breeds recognised as Brazilian by the Empresa Brasileira de Pesquisa Agropecuária, the national organisation for agricultural research.

== History ==
The history of the Pantaneiro goes back more than a hundred years; Towards the end of the nineteenth century, trypanosomiasis caused the number of the horses to decline; further declines were later caused by indiscriminate cross-breeding with horses of other breeds, by equine infectious anaemia and by equine pythiosis. A breed society – the Associação Brasileira De Criadores De Cavalo Pantaneiro – was formed in 1972, and a stud-book was started in the same year. A conservation herd – initially of three stallions, four mares, twenty-four fillies and eight colts – was established by the Empresa Brasileira de Pesquisa Agropecuária on the Nhumirim estate in the Nhecolândia district of the municipio of Corumbá.

In the twenty-first century the Pantaneiro is present in substantial numbers in the Pantanal. A registered population of 32104 is reported for 2024, with 20734 brood-mares and 11370 active stallions. Its conservation status was listed as "not at risk" by the Food and Agriculture Organization of the United Nations in 2007, and again in the DAD-IS database in 2026.

== Characteristics ==
It is a small horse. It is closely related to the Baixadeiro of the Baixada Maranhense wetlands of north-eastern Brazil, but is both taller and heavier. Average heights at the withers are 137 cm for mares and 142 cm for stallions and geldings; the average body weights are 340 kg and 360 kg respectively. The coat may be of any colour or pattern other than albino; the usual colours are grey, striped dun and the standard dark colours – bay, black, brown and chestnut.

The hooves are more resistant to prolonged immersion in water than those of horses of other breeds; the horses have a high tolerance of equine infectious anaemia, and are able to work even when infected.
