= Entre Rios de Minas =

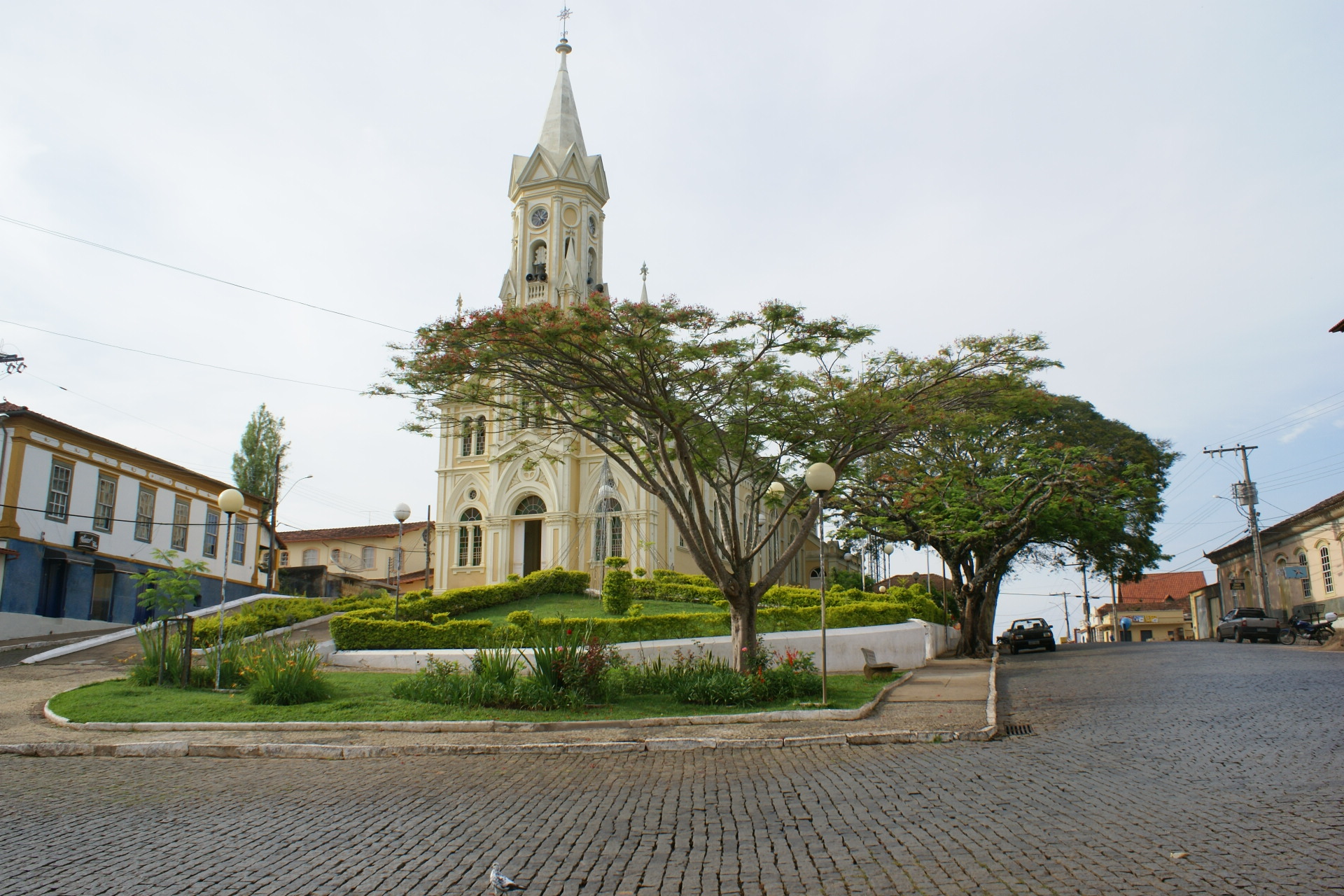
- Senador Ribeiro Square

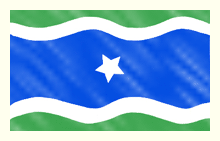
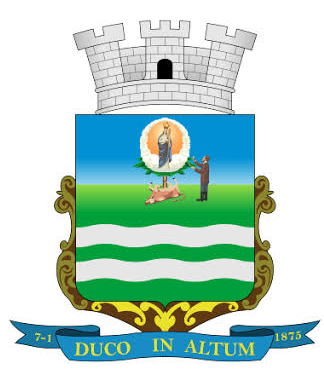
- Flag Coat of arms
- Nickname: Portuguese: Mesopotâmia Mineira (Mesopotamia of Minas Gerais)
- Motto: Latin: Duco in Altum (Led to the height)
- Location in Minas Gerais

- Location in Brazil
- Coordinates: 20°40′15″S 44°03′57″W
- Country: Brazil
- Region: Southeast
- State: Minas Gerais
- Mesoregion: Belo Horizonte
- Microregion: Conselheiro Lafaiete
- Settled: December 20, 1714
- Incorporated (municipality): January 3, 1880

Government
  - Mayor: Maria Cristina Mansur Teixeira Resende

Area
  - Total: 456.796 km^{2} (176.370 sq mi)
- Elevation: 950 m (3,120 ft)

Population (2022 Census)
  - Total: 14,746
  - Estimate (2025): 15,157
- Time zone: UTC−3 (BRT)
- CEP postal code: 35490-000
- Area code: 31
- HDI (2010): 0,672
- Website: Municipality website

Entre Rios de Minas is a Brazilian municipality located in the state of Minas Gerais. The city belongs to the mesoregion Metropolitana de Belo Horizonte and to the microregion of Conselheiro Lafaiete.

The Campolina horse breed originated in the Entre Rios de Minas. Cassiano Campolina of the Fazenda Tanque farm developed the Campolina in 1870 from a mare named "Medéia" and a stallion belonging to Mariano Procópio, who received the stallion from Dom Pedro II.

== See also ==
- List of municipalities in Minas Gerais
