= Campolina =

Breed of horse

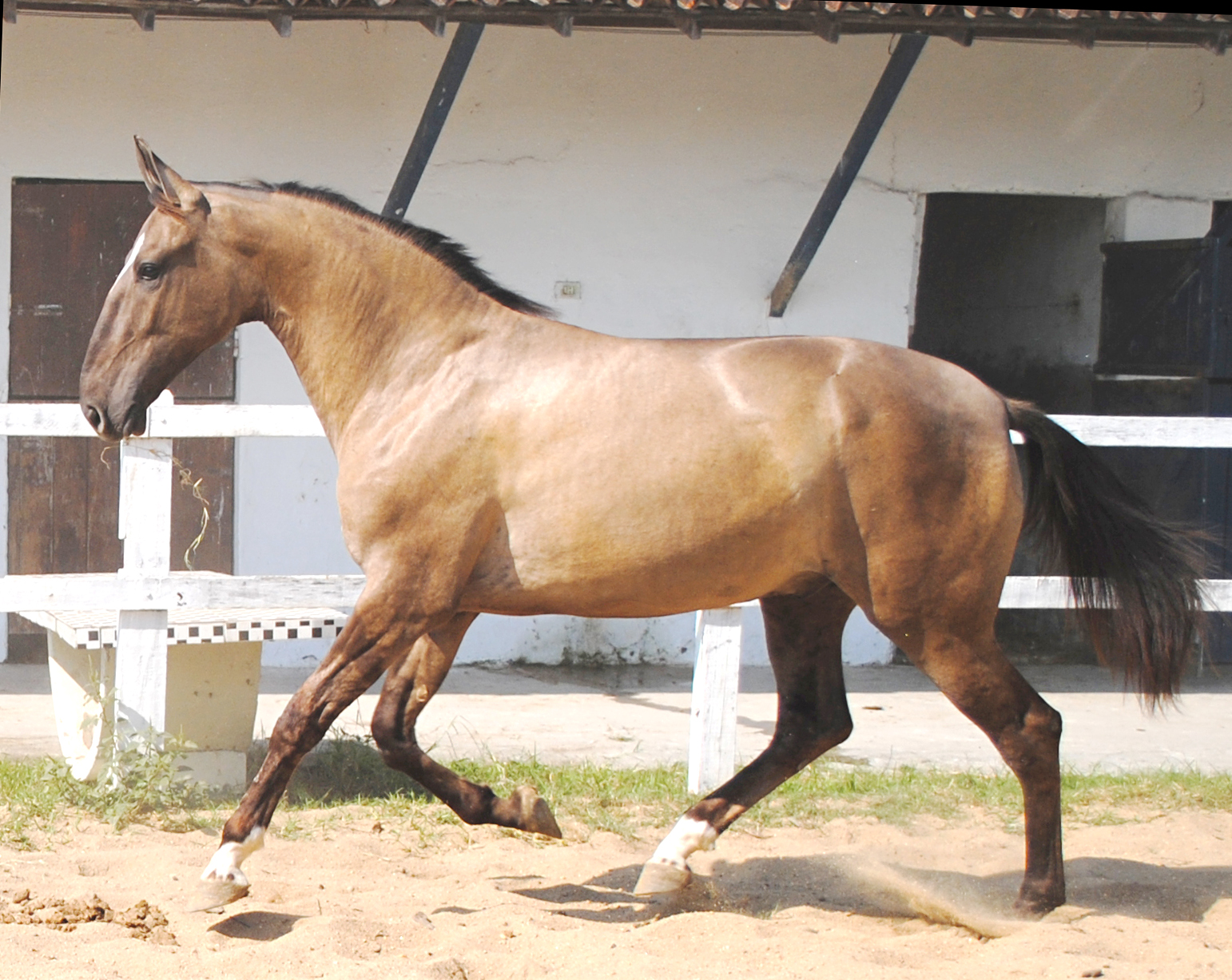
- Young Campolina
- Country of origin: Brazil

Traits
- Distinguishing features: Ambling gaits called marcha picada and "marcha batida"

Breed standards
- Assembléia Geral Extraordinária de Belo Horizonte

The Campolina horse breed of Brazil is named after Cassiano Campolina, the farmer who developed the breed. Beginning in 1870, they were developed using several different breeds of horses. The Campolina is one of the larger Brazilian breeds and may be found in most colors. They are a gaited breed, with an ambling gait. They are used mainly for leisure riding and driving and are increasingly used for dressage within Brazil.

== History ==
The Campolina breed dates back to 1870, when it was formed in Entre Rios de Minas, Minas Gerais in Brazil. It was developed by a farmer named Cassiano Campolina, on his farm Fazenda Tanque, beginning when he received a black mare named "Medéia" from his friend, Antonio Cruz. The mare was Brazilian, of Barb ancestry, and Campolina bred her to a pure Andalusian stallion. The stallion belonged to Mariano Procópio, to whom it had been presented as a gift by Dom Pedro II.

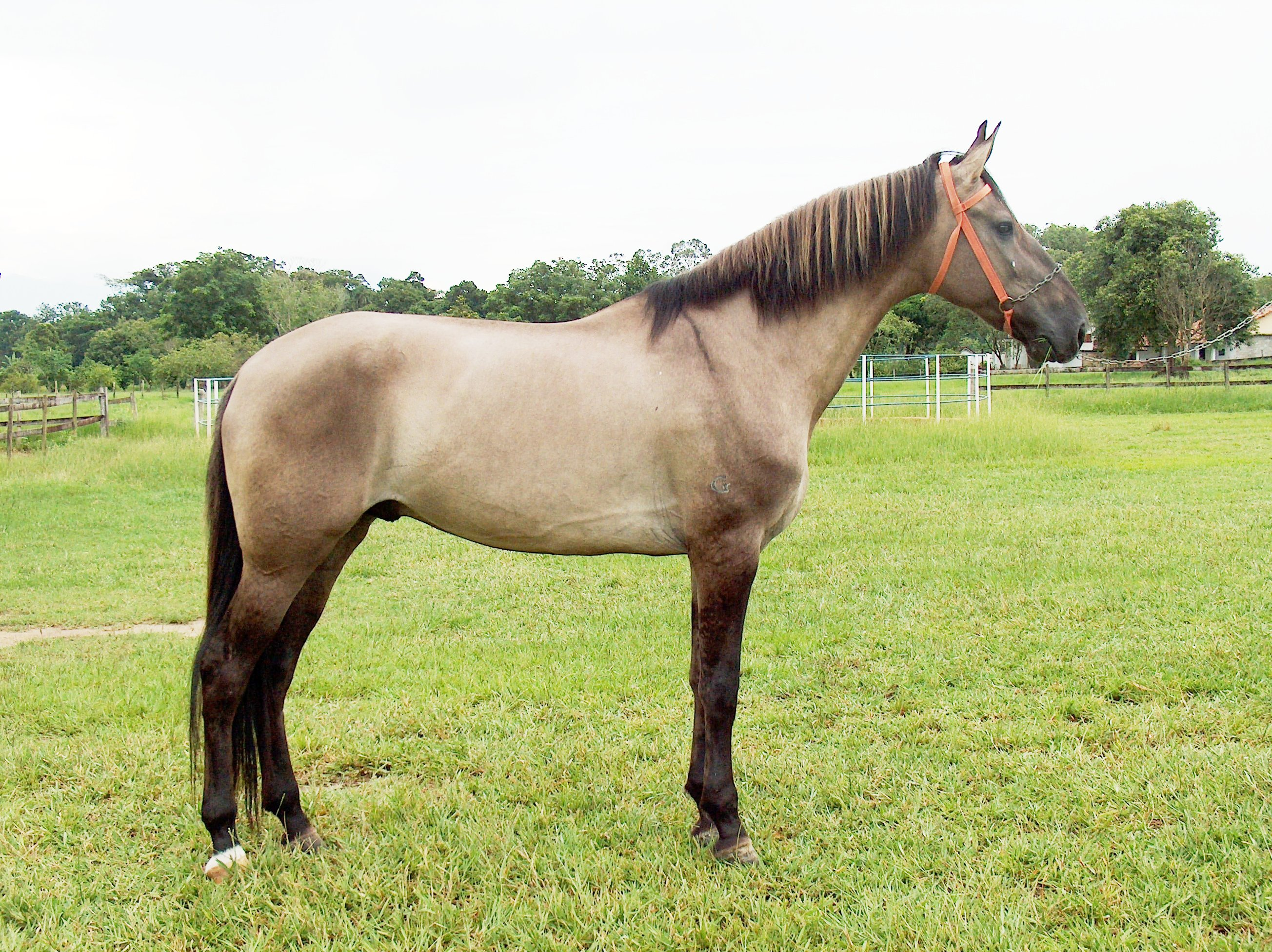
Note the squared profile of the torso and nasal bones. This conformation is ideal for the traditional, stereotyped, even paced, gait called the "marcha".

The resulting foal from the breeding was a gray colt named "Monarca", who lived until 1898 and served for 25 years in Campolina's herd; he is considered the foundation stallion of the Campolina breed. Other breeds that Campolina used in his herd were Anglo-Norman, Clydesdale, Holsteiner, and American Saddle Horse. Bloodlines from the Mangalarga Marchador, were also added to refine the Campolina. The herdbook was closed in 1934 and the breed standard was first defined. In 1938, the Professional Consortium of Campolina Horse Breeders was formed to formally organize the breed, and in 1951 the organization was renamed to the Campolina Breeders Association, the breed standards were formally adopted, with the organization based in Belo Horizonte. There were further updates to the breed standard in 1975 and 1993. There are currently around 85,000 registered Campolina horses, with slightly over 7,300 registered breeders. Around 4,300 mares were bred in 2003.

== Breed characteristics ==
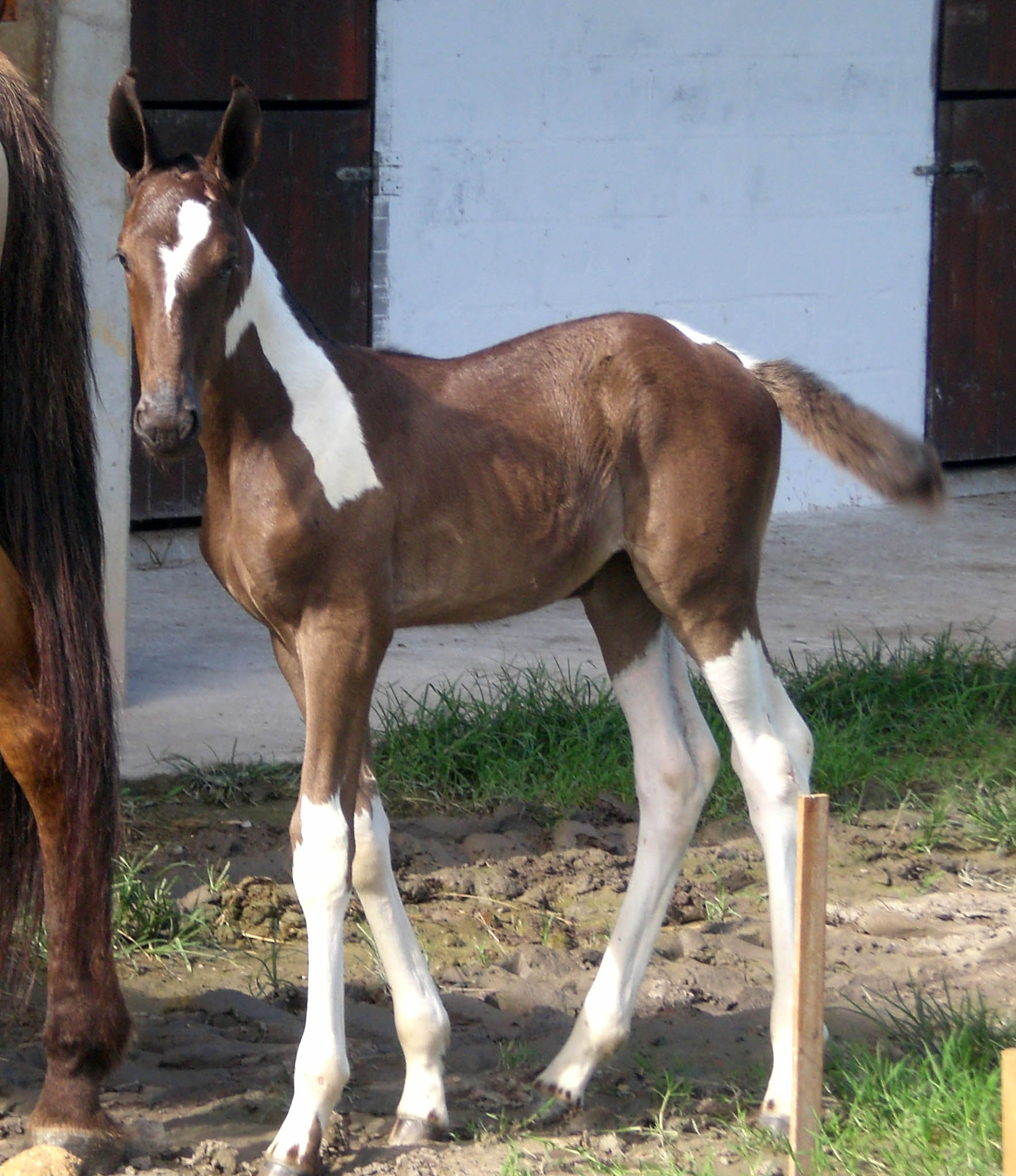
A pampa (pinto-patterned) filly.

The height at the withers of the Campolina averages 158 cm (15.2 hands) for stallions and 152 cm (15.0 h) for mares. A common view is that the most beautiful Campolinas are silver-grey, a position that may reflect a sentimental tradition for the first Campolina. Other popular colours for this breed include dun, bay, buckskin, and "Pampa" or pinto. The appearance of markings such as white socks or a star on the forehead neither adds nor detracts to the horse in terms of official judging.

Dun-colored Campolinas generally display pronounced primitive markings including dorsal stripe, pale guard hairs on either side of the mane, transverse shoulder strip, and leg striping, called "zippers" by Campolina breeders.

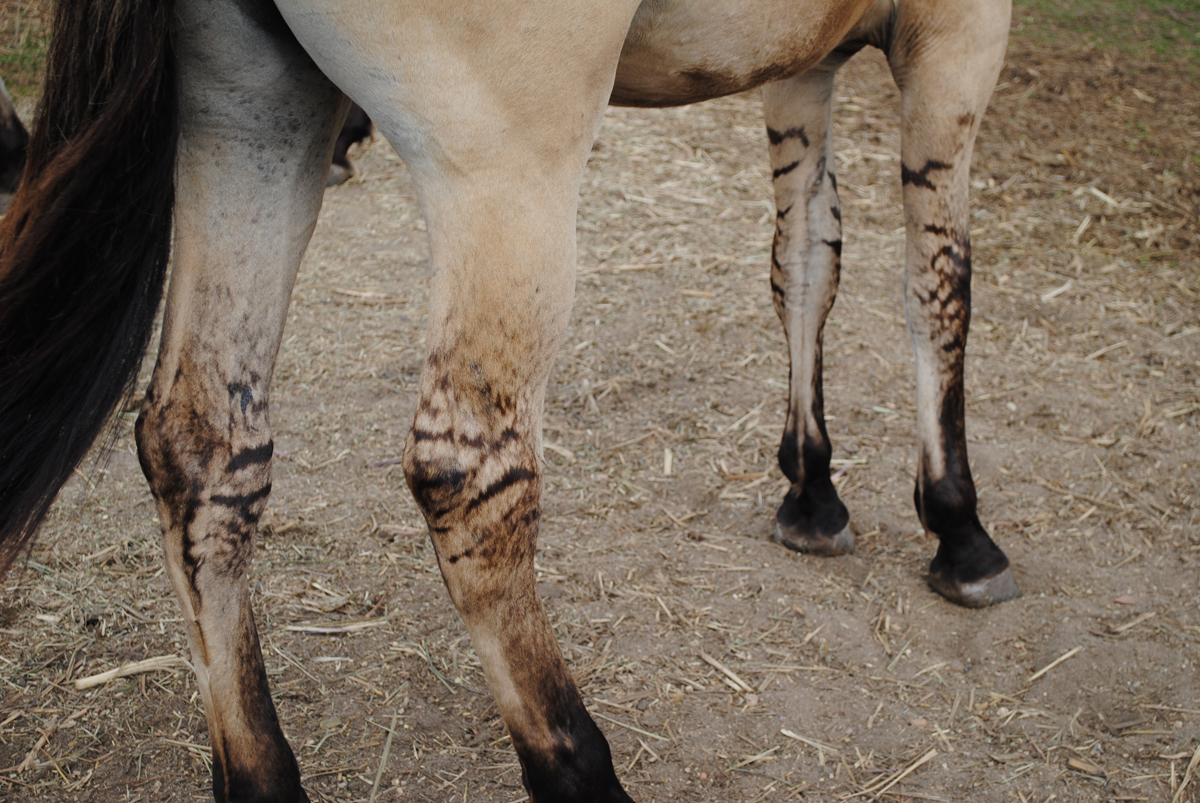
Leg bands or "zippers" on an adult female Campolina

=== Head ===
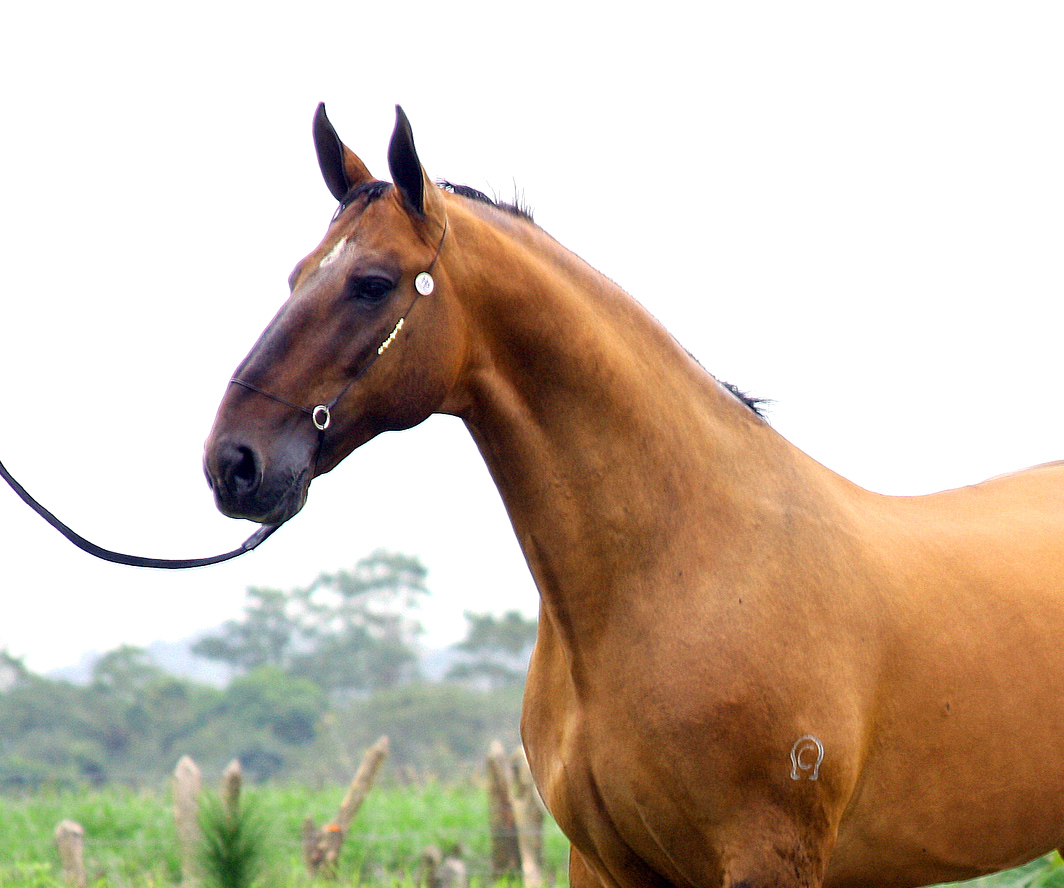
The desired head shape of a Campolina

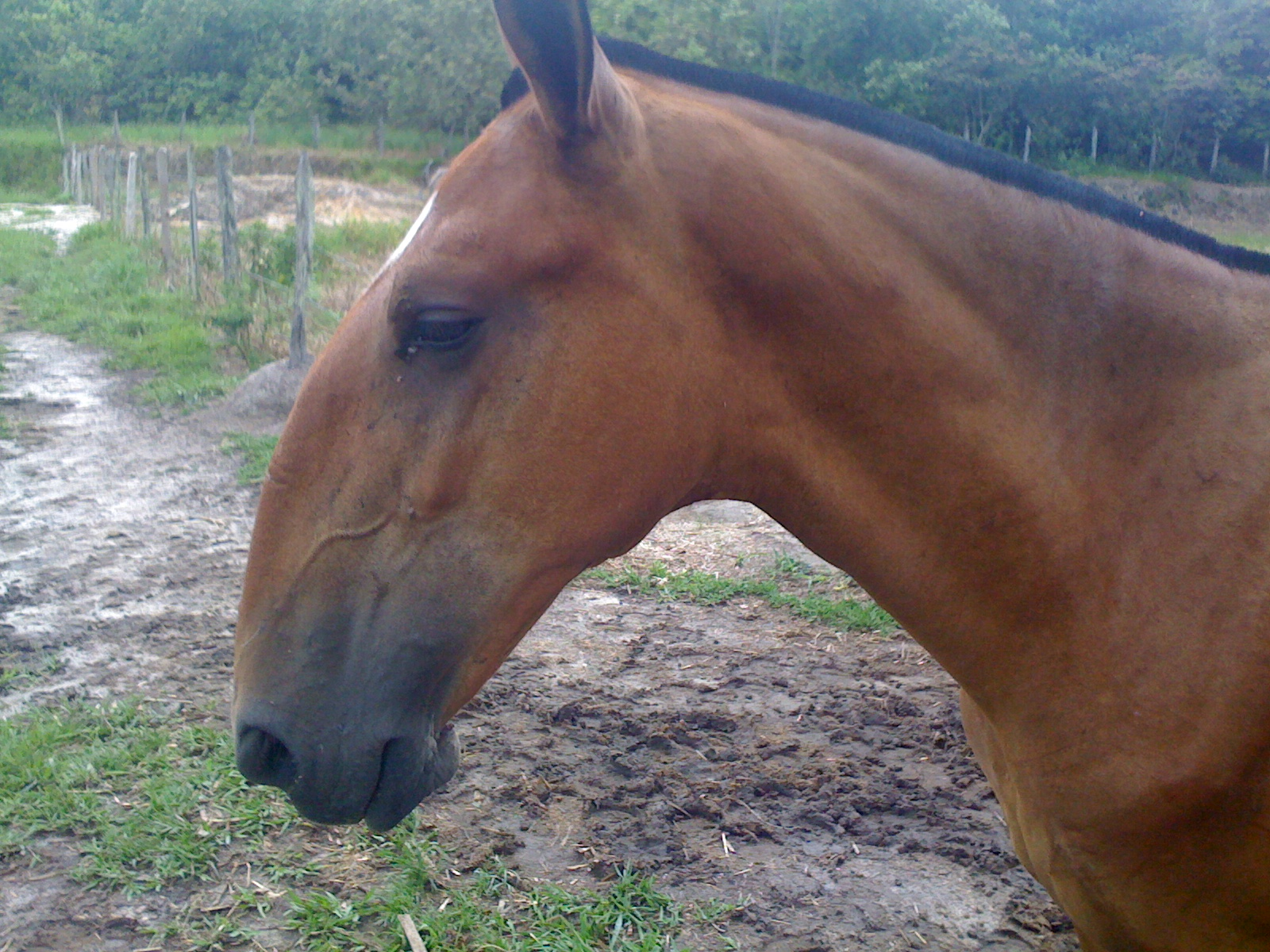
Hyperconvex nose, exaggerated beyond breed ideal

The head of the Campolina is described as trapezoidal in shape, but the silhouette of this horse is smoothly rounded. Between the ears, the poll is to be visible and raised by a few centimeters above the temples. The forehead is to be flat, and the nasal bones apparent near the midpoint of the face in the rostro caudal plane. The head in profile is convex. Campolinas are not, however, described to have a true Roman nose, as the convex profile begins approximately two finger widths below the base of the orbit. The muzzle should be soft and rounded, usually dark in colour, as are the hairs of the inner ear, mane and tail relative to the coat over the body. The nostrils are equal in size and should have a fine layer of flesh around the dorsal surface allowing for approximately one centimeter of separation between the thumb and pointer of the evaluator when the thumb is inserted into the nostril at a depth of around one inch. The outer edge of the nostril should be slightly thicker. The lips should be full and taut about the teeth. The ears are evenly placed when viewed from the front of the horse and not extend vertically more than three times the width of the eye when measured across the inner pinnae. The pinnae should close to a clean tip at the top of each ear. Eyes should be expressive.

=== Neck and body ===
In addition to the prominent curvature of the profile, the shape of the crest is also an important feature of the Campolina silhouette. In the relaxed forward pose, the ventral line of the neck from the caudal most point of the cheek to the top of the chest is quite straight. However, the dorsal surface of the neck should have a clear arch. This prominent crest accentuates the arch formed between the head and neck when the horse is flexed during riding. In a relaxed state, the balance of the face and neck from the side view can be evaluated by drawing a tangent from the points of maximal curvature. In the case of balanced conformation, the tangents should intersect roughly one inch in front of the ears (in the forward alert position).

The weight range for Campolina stallions and geldings is 550 to 600 kilograms (1,210 to 1,320 lb) and 350 to 450 kilograms (770 to 990 lb) for mares. In well-bred, well-conditioned animals, the chest is well developed. One symptom of poor breeding is a narrow chest with inadequate musculature between the front legs. This is a particular concern with the crossbred "Mangolina" (Mangalarga Marchador x Campolina) Visually, however, the breeding practice frequently results in animals that are heavy in the rear end and look weak and unbalanced in rostro-caudal plane when viewed for the animal's full length.

The underline of the Campolina should appear well fleshed but not overly rounded. There should be a good inverse symmetry in silhouette or side profile between the curvature of the underline and the fully outstretched neck and head. This conformation has been difficult to achieve in many animals, with many horses having the appearance of a short neck due to the curvature of the crest. The back of the Campolina should be a bit "long". When evaluating the animal's side profile, special attention should be paid to overall anatomical balance, which in this breed can err in overdevelopment of either the withers or the croup. Unbalanced horses tend to produce a rough ride and are referred to as having a "hard" gait. Specifically, the withers should be well-developed but not appear exaggerated or considerably higher than the highest point of the croup. In evaluating the hindquarters of the Campolina, the croup should be quite full, though not overly muscular except in stallions. In those animals used for Dressage however, the preferred build goes against the breed standard. Dressage horses are preferred to have an "uphill build" where the croup slightly lower than the withers. The tail of this breed should exit the rump at around the 1 o’clock position. Tails are typically mid to mid-low set. Very low tail sets often indicate mixed bloodlines with a likely influence of the Mangalarga Paulista in the genetic make-up of the animal under observation, but can be accounted for by a number of other breeds.

=== Gait and movement ===
The Campolina is a gaited horse breed with a smooth, four-beat ambling gait. It is the largest of the three gaited Brazilian breeds, due to the influence of heavier breeds from Northern Europe. The gait is called the true marcha or marcha verdadeira.

As one of the newer breeds, the standards for this animal have changed in recent generations. The provided images show the successive removal of the squaredness around the torso and shoulders and the nasal bones when viewed in profile. Historically, breeding schemes emphasized structure idealized for stereotyped, smooth and even paced gait. The newer examples of this breed display refinement in the torso, the nasal bones and around the mouth. These morphological changes confer increased degrees of freedom in joint movement and by extension, increased versatility generally in range and types of motion.

== Uses ==
The Campolina is used for pleasure and trail riding including dressage, and also driving.

== Projected evolution of breed standard ==
The Campolina breed is a young breed relative to other established horse lines (Akhal Teke, Arabian, Lippizan) and breed standards are still evolving. Current trends have suggested a move away from the square mouth and retilineo or straight region of the nasal bones as in image presented below. In the new ideal, male nasal bones are prominent, retain the height of the earlier ideals but are now expected to generate a smooth 'curved and continuous' appearance (see The desired head shape of a Campolina). The ideal for the profile of the female head is more dynamic with a narrowing between the nasal bones to refine the lower face. The curvature of the nasal bones should appear to extend naturally from the intersection of the orbit and maxillary and lead gently into the muzzle. Both male and female head profile ideals are moving towards refined, narrow curvature in the lips, especially the upper lip. In the case of the female Campolina, certain breeders now seek to develop the curvature of the croup and buttocks to balance the nasal profile (i.e. an "egua" (female horse) with a strongly curved profile must present a full, developed curvature of the rear).

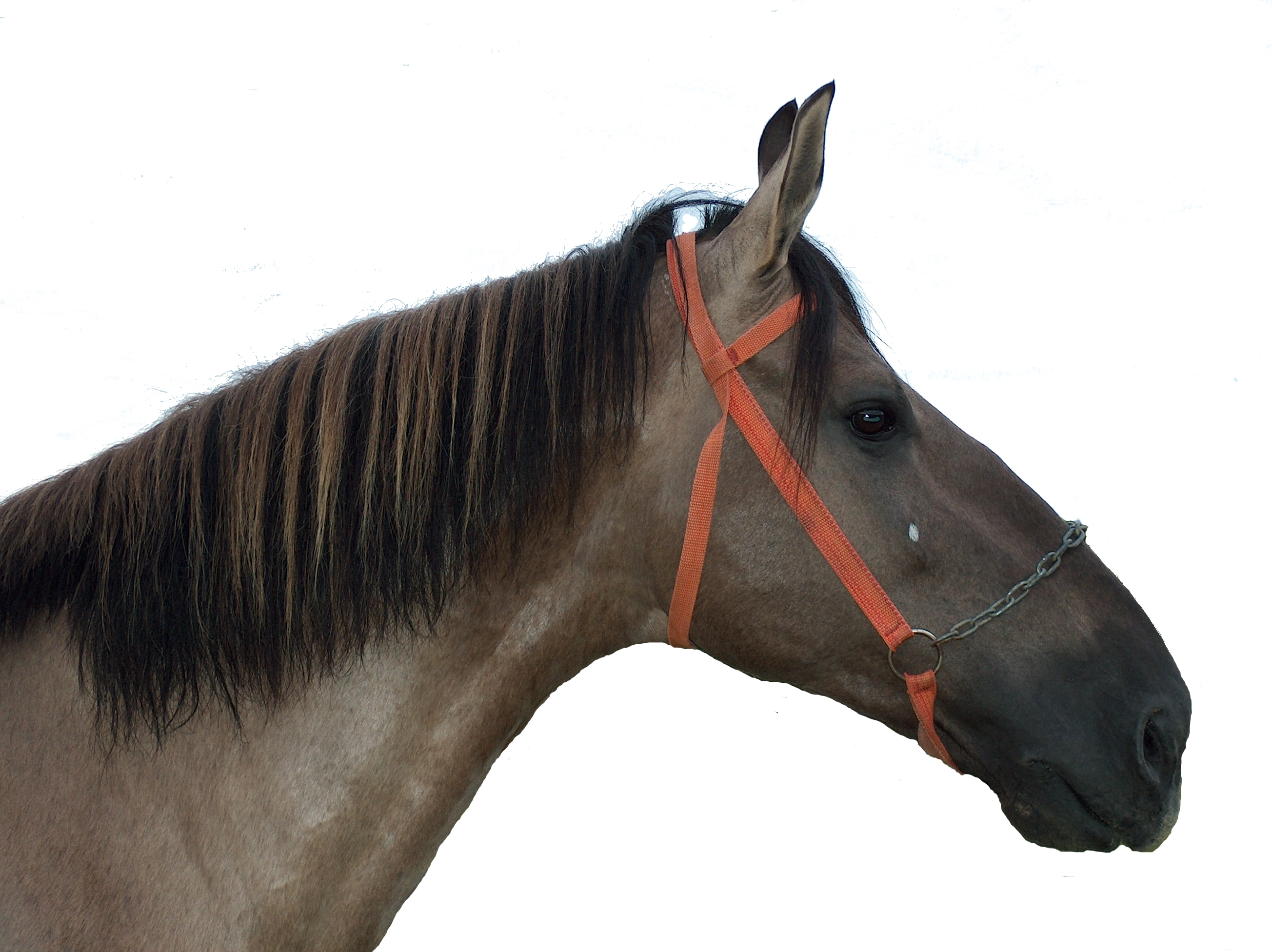
Former ideal for the head, note the squared profile of the nasal bones
