= Marajoara (horse breed) =

Brazilian breed of horse

- Conservation status: FAO (2007): not at risk; DAD-IS (2026): unknown
- Other names: Baixa-Amazona
- Country of origin: Brazil
- Distribution: Marajó island, Pará

Traits
- Weight: Male: 350 kg; Female: 300 kg
- Height: Male: 145 cm; Female: 135 cm
- Colour: any but pinto or pseudo-albino

The Marajoara is a Brazilian breed of small horse. It is native to – and is named for – the island of Marajó, the largest of the Marajó Archipelago in the Amazon Delta in the state of Pará. The smaller Puruca breed of the same island derives from cross-breeding of Marajoara horses with imported Shetland Pony stock.

== History ==
The Marajoara is one of the thirteen horse breeds recognised as Brazilian by the Empresa Brasileira de Pesquisa Agropecuária, the national organisation for agricultural research. A breed society – the Associação Brasileira dos Criadores de Cavalo da Raça Marajoara – was formed in Belém in 1979; its authorisation by the Ministério da Agricultura e Pecuária, the Brazilian ministry of agriculture, was revoked in 2019.

A conservation herd is maintained at the Banco de Germoplasma Animal da Amazônia Oriental, on the banks of the Paracauari River in the municipio of Salvaterra, by Embrapa Amazônia Oriental – the regional administration of the Empresa Brasileira de Pesquisa Agropecuária. In 2012 there were 45 horses in the herd.

== Characteristics ==
It is a small horse. Average heights at the withers are 135 cm for mares and 145 cm for stallions and geldings; the average body weights are 300 kg and 350 kg respectively. The coat may be of any colour other than pinto or albino.
