= Puruca =

Brazilian breed of horse

- Conservation status: FAO (2007): no data; DAD-IS (2026): unknown
- Country of origin: Brazil
- Distribution: Marajó island, Pará

Traits
- Weight: Male: 200 kg; Female: 185 kg
- Height: Male: 114 cm; Female: 108 cm
- Colour: any but pinto or pseudo-albino

The Puruca is a Brazilian breed of small or miniature horse. It is native to the island of Marajó, the largest of the Marajó Archipelago in the Amazon Delta in the state of Pará. It derives from cross-breeding of horses of the Marajoara breed of that island with imported Shetland Pony stock.

== History ==
The Puruca is one of the thirteen horse breeds recognised as Brazilian by the Empresa Brasileira de Pesquisa Agropecuária, the national organisation for agricultural research. It results from cross-breeding of horses of the Marajoara breed of the island of Marajó with Shetland Pony stock imported in the late nineteenth century from France. A breed society – the Associação Brasileira dos Criadores de Puruca – was formed in 1986; its authorisation by the Ministério da Agricultura e Pecuária, the Brazilian ministry of agriculture, was revoked in 2019.

The horses number no more than a thousand in total; a conservation herd is maintained at the Banco de Germoplasma Animal da Amazônia Oriental, on the banks of the Paracauari River in the municipio of Salvaterra, by Embrapa Amazônia Oriental – the regional administration of the Empresa Brasileira de Pesquisa Agropecuária.

== Characteristics ==
It is a very small or miniature horse. Average heights at the withers are 108 cm for mares and 114 cm for stallions and geldings; the average body weights are 185 kg and 200 kg respectively. The coat may be of any colour other than pinto or albino.
