= Nordestino (horse) =

Breed of horse

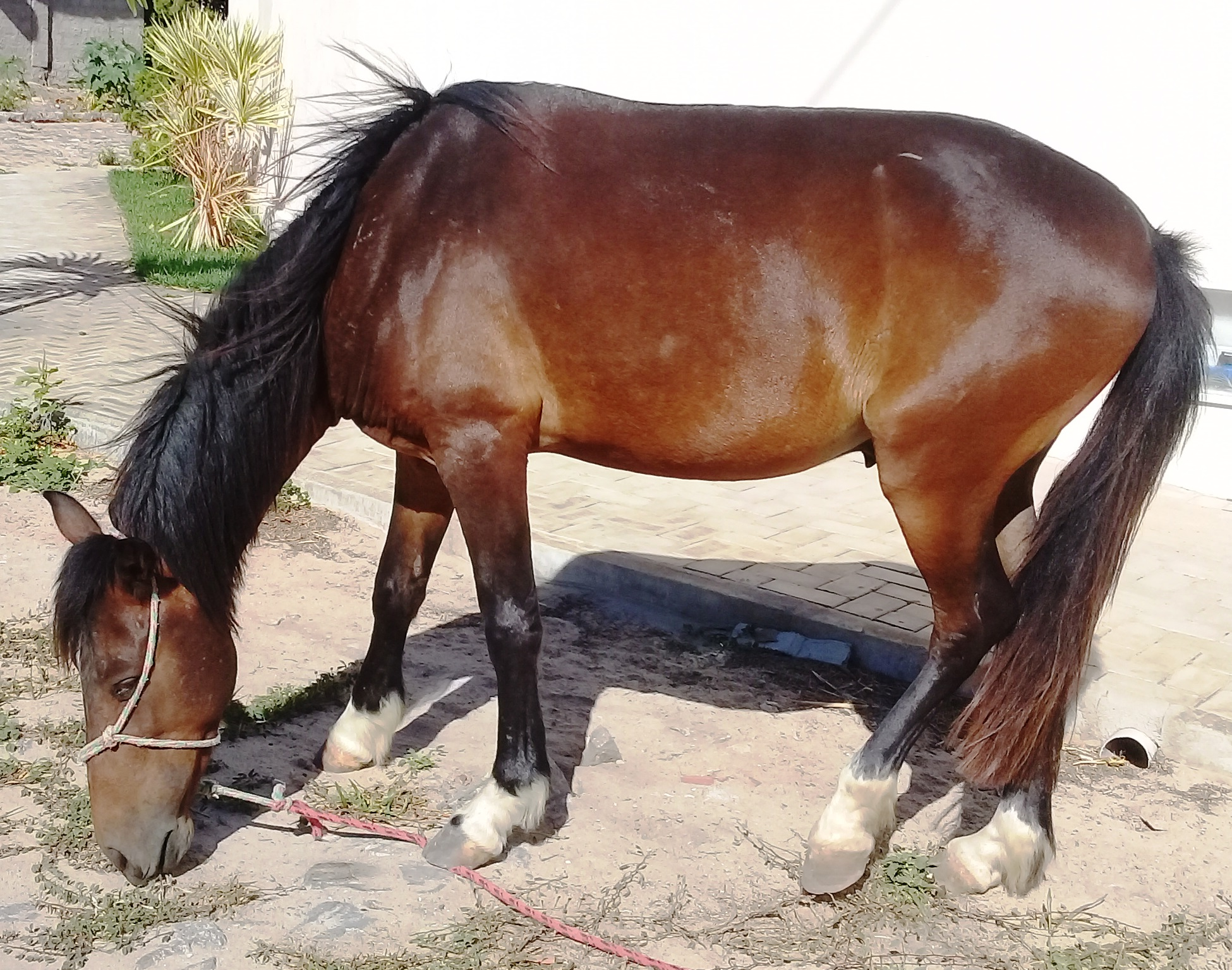
- Nordestino horse
- Country of origin: Brazil

The Nordestino, also known as Crioulo Nordestino, Mourão, Pé Duro Nordestino or Sertanejo do Nordeste, is a breed of horses native to the Northeast Region of Brazil. The breed is near extinction due to the lack of interest in maintaining it. A stud-book was created and approved in 1987 by the Brazilian government; nevertheless in 2017 the authorization to carry out the genealogical records of the breed was revoked by the Ministry of Agriculture ("Portaria n. 1.537/2017" do MAPA published in Diário Oficial da União, on 26 July 2017, section 1, page 17) causing the loss of the breed's lines records. It is the first native horse breed of Brazil, and derived from the first horses brought by Portuguese settlers in the sixteenth century. Over time the horses have evolved into a small breed very well-adapted to surviving in the local semi-arid climate of the Northeast Region. Today around 500,000 horses (purebred and mixed) survive in the region pulling horse carts or in cattle work.

== History ==
=== Origin ===
With the discovery of Brazil by the Portuguese the horse was introduced into South America where it was nonexistent. In 1535 it was introduced into the Northeast Region of Brazil in Bahia and Pernambuco through the efforts of Duarte Coelho, first grantee of the Captaincy of Pernambuco, and Tomé de Sousa the first governor of Bahia and Brazil that when establishing along the Rio dos Currais (now São Francisco River) cattle farms (provided with cattle and horses) was the precursor of this new breed. This breed was originated from a mixture of runaway farm horses, abandoned horses and horses that survived aboriginal attacks on cattle farms.

=== Genetic background ===
It descends mainly from Iberian horse breeds, namely the Garrano, Sorraia and the Barb horse. These horses were brought mainly from Madeira Island, Cape Verde and Continental Portugal.

=== Currently ===
For several centuries this breed was used by vaqueiro sertanejo, the Brazilian vaquero (Portuguese: vaqueiro) as a work horse all over the Northeast Sertão. With the almost complete disappearance of this profession at the end of the 20th century, the breed followed the same path. Today few specimens remain. Some are in use by vaqueiros, others are used to pull horse carts, and few are used as leisure horses (the breed is not commonly used as a leisure horse due to its low stature and rugged appearance).

== Characteristics ==
This breed is highly adapted to the semi-arid climate of the Brazilian Northeast Sertão. It withstands dry and hot environments and can feed and subsist on low nutritional quality plants with scarce or unhealthy water. Besides having a low stature (typical of the Brazilian corral horse breeds) it also resists hoof wear due to its very hard hooves. This is the reason why it is also called Pé Duro ("hard foot"). The majority of specimens have a natural ambling gait.

Standard morphological characteristics:

- Profile – Straight but sometimes concave profile. Light body with an average of 150 kilograms (330 lb) to 250 kilograms (550 lb) in weight. Long legs and short coat all year round.
- Height – Even though they are less than 150 centimetres (59 in; 14.3 hands) at the withers, they are not considered ponies as conformed in the studbook. Adults measure between 130 centimetres (51 in; 12.3 hands) and 150 centimetres (59 in; 14.3 hands) at the withers.
- Colors – The most common coat color is brown (similar to the Garrano), but it also can be grey (flea-bitten and dapple grey) or red dun.
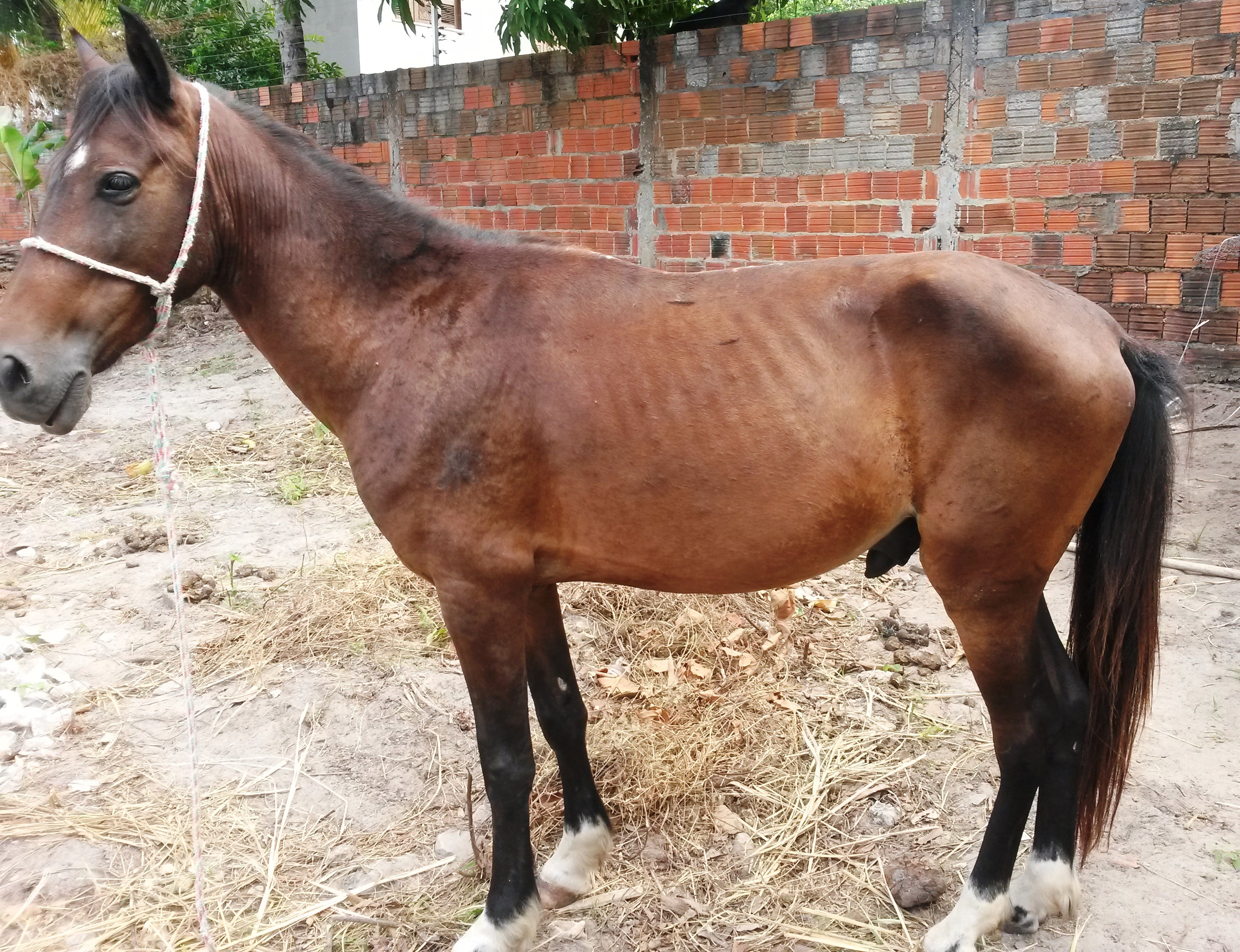
Brown color coat

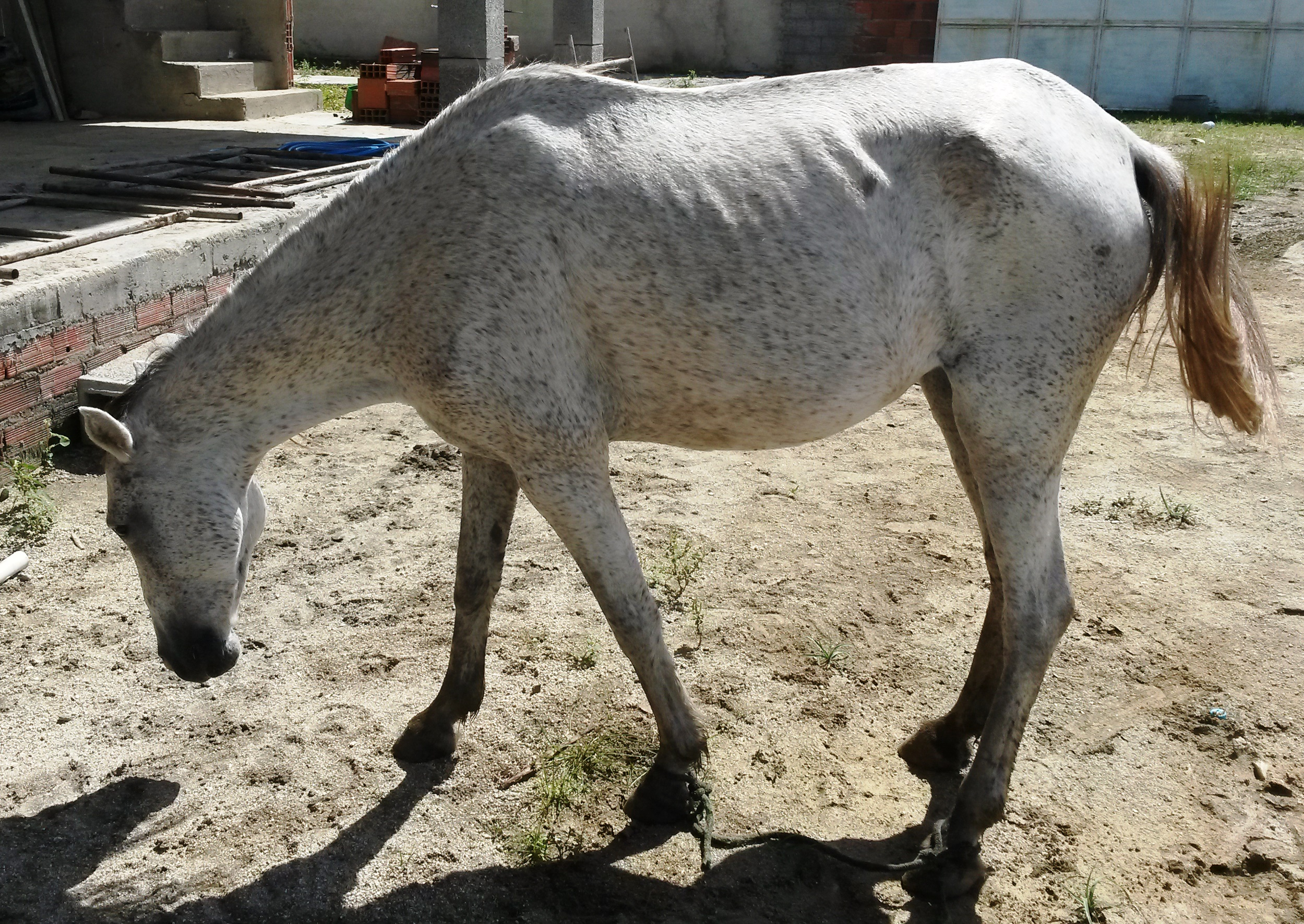
Grey color coat
- Temperament – Active, docile and apt to cattle work, saddle riding and sports.
- Gait – Besides the easy and fast natural gait, it easily produces a natural ambling gait that allows a smooth-riding four-beat footfall pattern.
- Fitness – Good for saddle riding and also for work (especially cart wagons). Very good aptitude for pursuing cattle with the vaqueiros in the thorny forests of the caatinga.

== Associations of breeders and enthusiasts ==
Besides the first association, the Associação Brasileira de Criadores de Cavalo Nordestino (ABCCN) which no longer exists, some organizations that promote the breed and its use have been founded. The majority of the animals are concentrated in the Brazilian northeast region, with three associations there: the Associação Brasileira de Criadores de Cavalo Nordestino (ABCCN); the Núcleo de Preservação e Seleção do Cavalo Nordestino (NPSCN); and the Associação Equestre e de Preservação do Cavalo Nordestino (AEPCN). They try to preserve the breed and its characteristics.

== Breed status in the Ministry of Agriculture (Brazil) (MAPA) ==
The Brazilian Ministry of Agriculture (MAPA) recognizes the breed, the standard of which was submitted for analysis and approved in 1987. However, this was not enough to consolidate an organized breeding program for the breed and attract more interested parties. In a document made available in 2016, based on data from 2013, the ministry warns of the need for organization of the breed and that there are currently estimated 500,000 live animals including purebred and crossbred animals. In the same document the MAPA indicates that the association responsible for the breed has been inactive for eight years, without mentioning its name. It is likely the Associação Brasileira de Criadores de Cavalo Nordestino (ABCCN), whose authorization to maintain the genealogical records of the breed was revoked a year later, na Portaria n. 1.537/2017 do MAPA published on the Diário Oficial da União, on the date 26 July 2017, section 1, page 17. This revoked authorization was given in 1974. Currently several associations are taking the registry of the line breeds into their hands. The organizations are Núcleo de Preservação e Seleção do Cavalo Nordestino (NPSCN) and the Associação Equestre e de Preservação do Cavalo Nordestino (AEPCN).
