= Baixadeiro =

Brazilian breed of horse

- Conservation status: FAO (2007): not listed; DAD-IS (2026): unknown
- Country of origin: Brazil
- Distribution: Maranhão, Nordeste

Traits
- Weight: Male: 250 kg; Female: 245 kg
- Height: Male: 128 cm; Female: 123 cm

The Baixadeiro is a Brazilian breed of small horse native to the wetlands of the Baixada Maranhense, in the state of Maranhão, in the Nordeste region of north-eastern Brazil; the name of the breed derives from that of the wetland area. It was identified in 2005, and a conservation nucleus was established in the municipio of Pinheiro. By 2014 the Baixadeiro was among the thirteen horse breeds recognised as Brazilian by the Empresa Brasileira de Pesquisa Agropecuária, the national organisation for agricultural research.

It is closely related to the Pantaneiro of the Pantanal wetlands of western Brazil, but is smaller.

== Characteristics ==
The Baixadeiro is a small horse. Average heights at the withers are variously given as 123 cm for mares and 128 cm for males; or as 142 cm.
