= Mangalarga =

Breed of horse

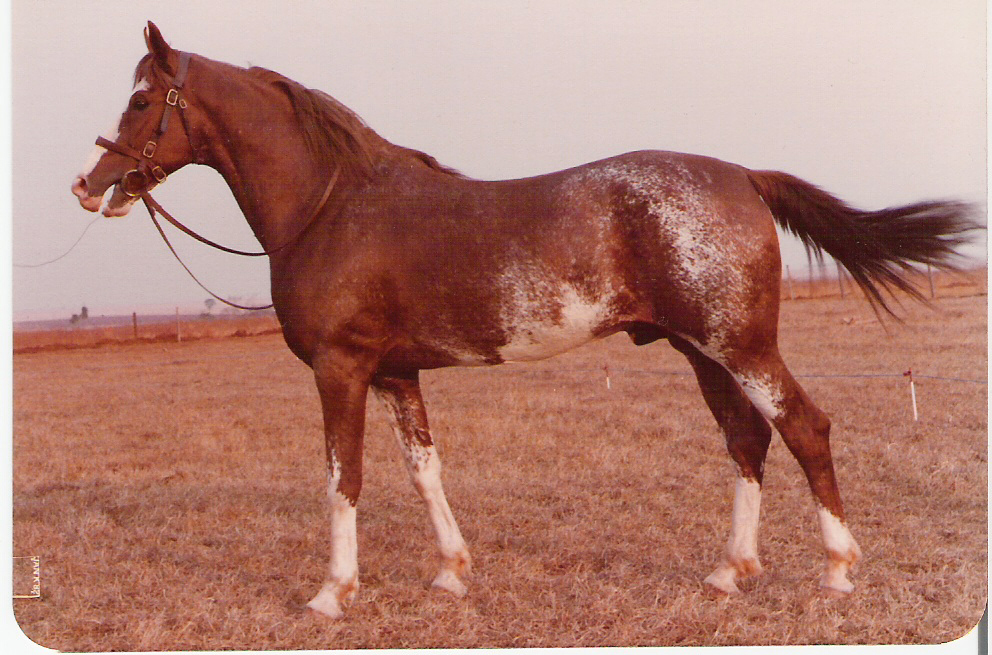
- Mangalarga
- Other names: Mangalarga Paulista
- Country of origin: Brazil

The Mangalarga is a horse breed that was originally developed in Brazil by Francisco Gabriel Junqueira, the Baron of Alfenas, when he began breeding Alter Real stallions from Portugal with local Colonial Spanish mares on his lands in Orlândia County at São Paulo State.

Thus work of Junqueira also developed the Mangalarga Marchador breed that differs from the Mangalarga due to the influence of different bloodlines and a focus on different traits. However, at the beginning, there was just one type of horse, the "Mangalarga Horse". However, today the two breeds are different from one another and each has its own studbook and breed associations.

A 2013 study found that the Mangalarga Paulista had one of the highest inbreeding coefficients among all horse breeds.
