= Campeiro =

Breed of horse

- Other names: Marchador das Araucárias
- Country of origin: Brazil

Traits
- Distinguishing features: Ambling gait, small size, male height: 1.42–1.54 m female height: 1.40–1.52 m

Breed standards
- Associação Brasileira de Criadores de Cavalo Campeiro

The Campeiro is a breed of small horse from Brazil. It is thought to descend from horses brought to South America in the sixteenth century. Because it has an ambling gait and comes from the area of the Araucária forests of southern Brazil, it may also be known as the Marchador das Araucárias.

== History ==
The Campeiro is thought to descend from horses lost from the expedition of Álvar Núñez Cabeza de Vaca in 1541 from Santa Catarina Island to the new Spanish settlement at Asunción (now the capital of Paraguay). It is likely that among its ancestors there are also horses lost from other Spanish expeditions in the area. The horses became established as a feral population on the mainland, on the plateaux that are now parts of the states of Santa Catarina, Paraná, and Rio Grande do Sul, and are characterised by the Araucária moist forest biome, where they became very numerous.

The horses were first seen and reported in 1728 by the exploratory expedition of Francisco de Souza e Faria from the coast of Santa Catarina across the plateau in the direction of the settlement of Curitiba (now the capital of Paraná state). Three years later the horses were again seen, by Cristovão Pereira de Abreu, who captured some hundreds of them.

When the first fazendas were established in the area, some of the horses were captured and selectively bred, particularly for their ambling gait, for many generations. A breed association, the Associação Brasileira de Criadores de Cavalo Campeiro, was formed in Curitibanos in 1976. The breed was officially recognised by the Ministério da Agricultura, Pecuária e Abastecimento, the Brazilian ministry of agriculture, in 1985, and a stud-book was opened.

== Characteristics ==
The Campeiro is a small horse: the average height at the withers is 1.44 metres (14.1 hands; 57 in) and the average weight 420 kilograms (930 lb). The most common color is chestnut, followed by bay and gray.

== Use ==
The Campeiro is raised almost exclusively on the Planalto Serrano de Santa Catarina and is usually managed extensively, although working horses and those in preparation for showing or competition are usually stabled.

The Campeiro is suitable for use as a saddle horse or for drawing light loads. It is often used for cattle-herding.
