= Mangalarga Marchador =

Brazilian breed of riding horse

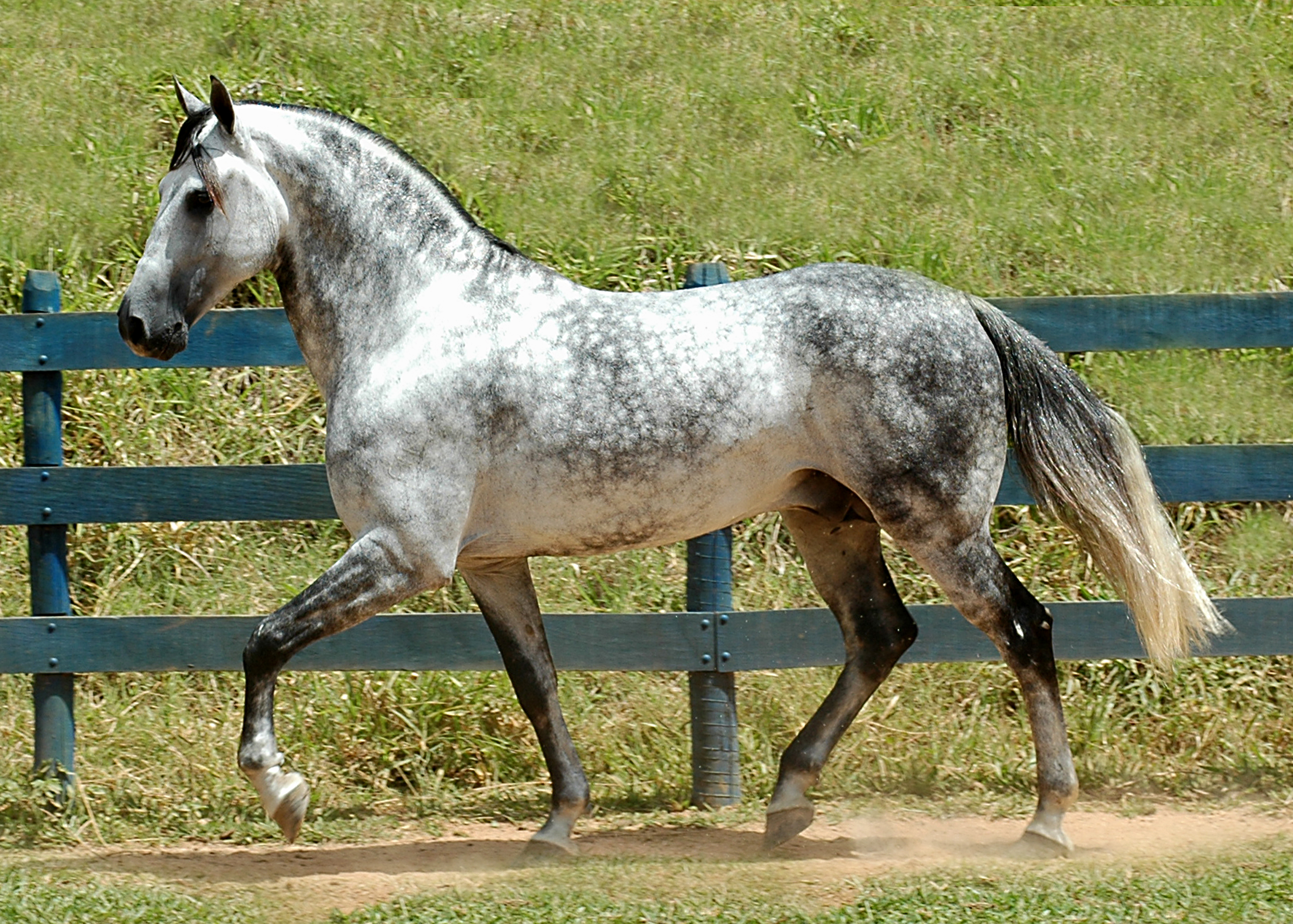
- Country of origin: Brazil
- Standard: Associação Brasileira dos Criadores do Cavalo Mangalarga Marchador (in Portuguese); U.S. Mangalarga Marchador Association; European Association of Mangalarga Marchador (in German)

Traits
- Height: Male: 1.52–1.57 m; Female: 1.40–1.54 m

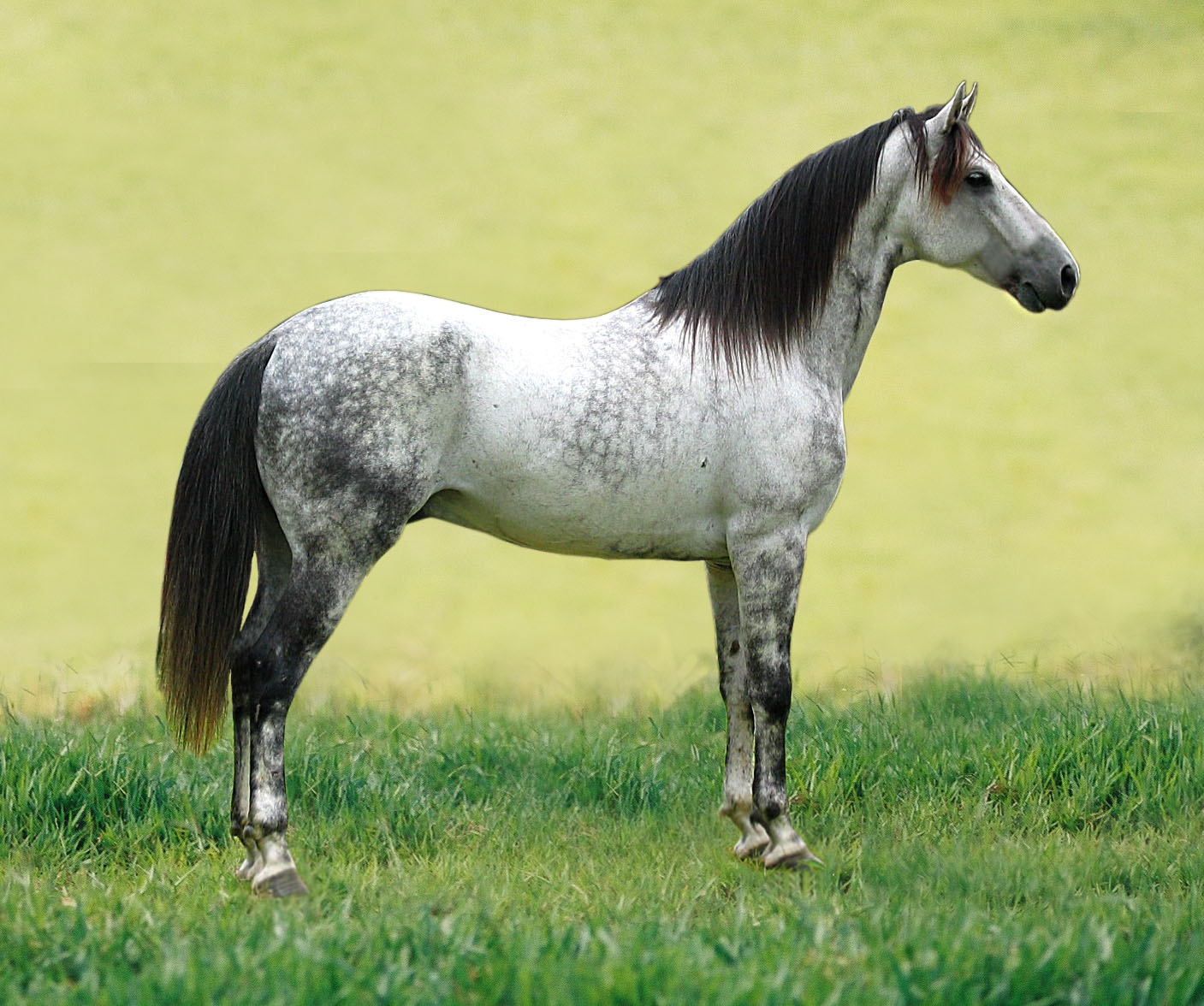
Typical conformation

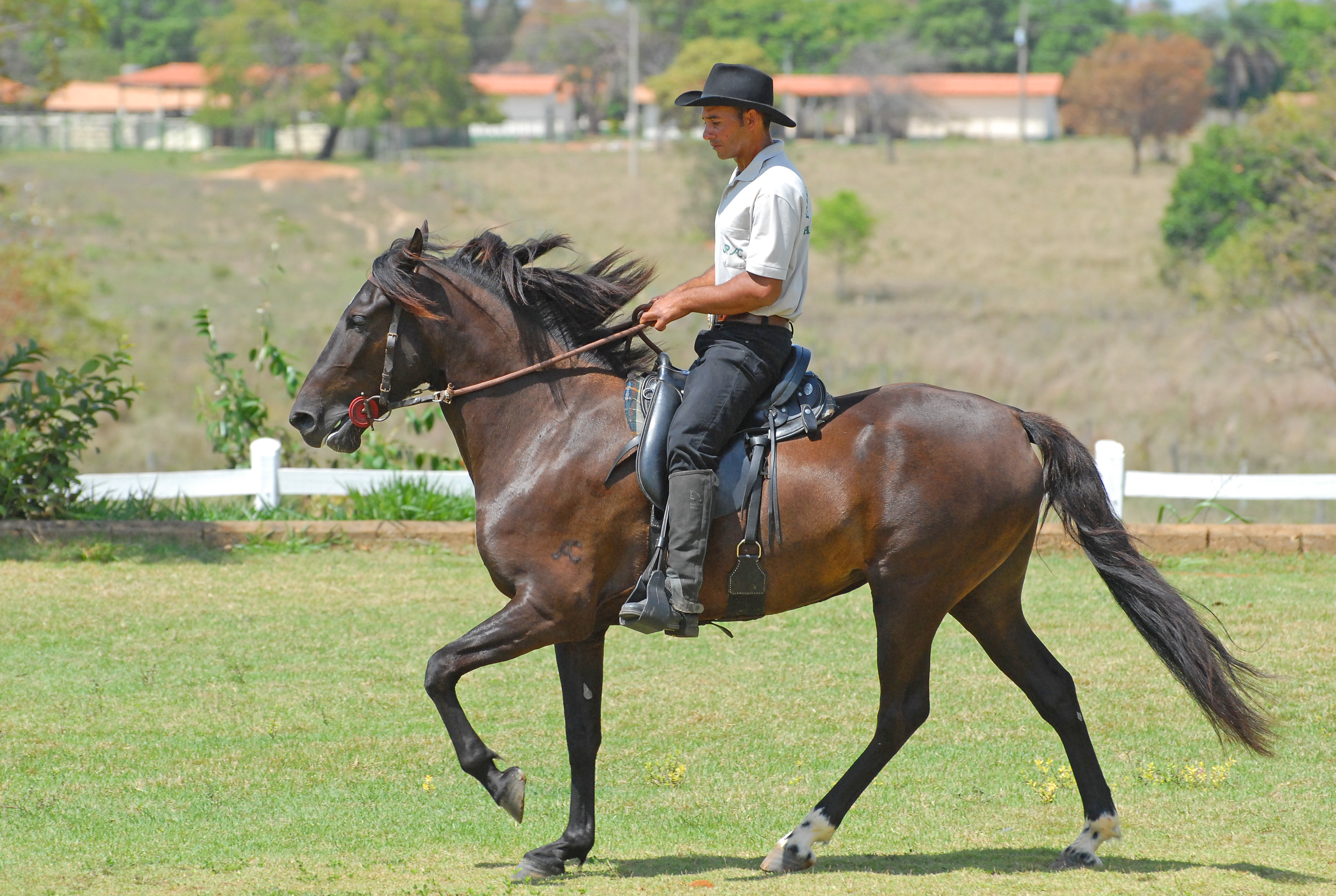
Mare showing triple support in the marcha picada

The Mangalarga Marchador is a Brazilian breed of riding horse. It is the national horse breed of Brazil, where there are more than half a million of them; it is among the most numerous breeds of riding horse in the world. It derives from cross-breeding of Portuguese Alter Real horses with local Criollo stock. It displays four gaits: the walk, the canter, and two ambling gaits, the marcha batida and the marcha picada; it does not trot.

== History ==
=== Origin ===
Francisco Gabriel Junqueira, Baron of Alfenas, began breeding his imported Lusitano to the mares on his farm (primarily Barbs, along with other breeds brought to Brazil when it was colonized). The result was a smooth-gaited, attractive horse which the baron called Sublime.

Junqueira sold some of the Sublimes to a friend who had a farm in Paty do Alferes, Rio de Janeiro. The farm's name was Mangalarga, and the owner rode Sublimes to and from Rio de Janeiro. In Rio, people noticed the smooth-gaited, attractive Sublimes and began calling them Mangalargas. Breeders and researchers note that until at least 1910, most ranchers involved in the breed's development (especially Junqueira Family members) followed the baron's recommendations to fix the breed's marching gait, hardiness, endurance, health and temperament.

=== Breed split ===
In 1934, the Mangalarga Breeders Association was created. Its founders wanted to establish a clear direction for breeding and define the breed's function and desired characteristics (particularly the intended gait). They had largely achieved objectives dating back to 1812–1816, when a number of breeders moved from Minas Gerais (where the breed originated) to São Paulo. They had introduced bloodlines from several non-gaited horse breeds, including the (Arabian, Anglo-Arabian, Thoroughbred, Lusitano and the American Saddlebred. These crosses were intended to adapt the Mangalarga to the local topography, with a minimal loss of gait smoothness. This blood remains in only a few female lines of the Mangalarga Marchador.

Friction developed between those who wanted to maintain the breed's original objectives and those defending the new type. The Mangalarga Breeders Association closed its stud book in 1943, nine years after its foundation. A group of breeders who disagreed with this decision met in 1948 and founded the Association Mangalarga Marchador, which became the ABCCMM. Although separate breed organizations exist for the Mangalarga and the Mangalarga Marchador and the breeds have different bloodlines and conformation, their roots are similar.

To unite differing factions and create a new stud book, the breeders turned to Geraldo Carneiro. Carneiro, a veterinarian and zoologist, was a friend and neighbor of the governor of Minas Gerais and future Brazilian president Juscelino Kubitschek and helped found a new breed association to preserve the original Marchador horse. The breeders met in Caxambu (where a Mangalarga Marchador museum is located); among those present were Joaquim Fernandes Braga (superintendent of the Minas Gerais Animal Production Department and Secretary of Agriculture, Industry, Trade and Labor) and personnel from the federal Ministry of Agriculture.

In 2017 the breed numbered close to 540,000 head in Brazil. About 350 are registered with a breed association in the United States.. The Brazilian breed association is the ABCCMM. In North America, the Mangalarga Marchador breed association is the USMMA, a nucleo of the ABCCMM.

The Mangalarga Marchador breed exists internationally, with horses found in many countries. Europe and the United States have the most numbers outside of its native country, Brazil.

== Characteristics ==
The Mangalarga Marchador is a medium-sized breed with a silky coat, prominent withers, deep chest, a proportionately-long back, muscular hindquarters, a sloping croup and hard hoofs. Not all coat colours are accepted for registration - appaloosa for example is not. For stallions the ideal height is 152 centimetres (15.0 hands; 60 in), with a range for registration from 147 centimetres (14.2 hands; 58 in) to 157 centimetres (15.2 hands; 62 in). The ideal height for mares is 146 centimetres (14.1 hands; 57 in), ranging from 140 centimetres (13.3 hands; 55 in) to 154 centimetres (15.1 hands; 61 in).

Its head is triangular in shape with a straight profile, large nostrils, ears pointing slightly inwards and large, expressive eyes. Stallions have a slight crest on their neck.

=== Gaits ===
The breed is smooth-gaited, with two natural intermediate speed ambling gaits, called marcha; the marcha batida, where the feet move diagonally, in a manner similar to a fox trot, and the marcha picada, a four-beat lateral gait, similar to a stepping pace or singlefoot. The picada, which means "light touch" in Portuguese, is usually the smoother of the two, because the lateral movement creates little vertical momentum, and is similar to the paso llano of the Peruvian Paso. Conversely, batida means "to hit", and that gait is similar to the trocha gait of the Paso Fino.

On level ground at a normal speed, the Mangalarga Marchador will overstep slightly; in other words, the hind hoofprints will cover (or slightly pass) the front hoofprints. The marcha is said by breed aficionados to be comfortable to ride. The Mangalarga Marchador does not trot or pace, moving from the marcha into a canter.
