= Ambling gait =

Horse gait

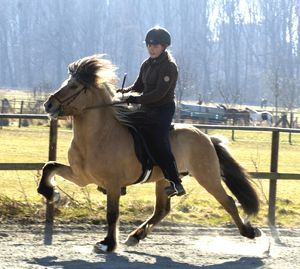
An Icelandic horse performing a rapid ambling gait known as the tölt

An ambling gait or amble is any of several four-beat intermediate horse gaits, all of which are faster than a walk but usually slower than a canter and always slower than a gallop. Horses that amble are sometimes referred to as "gaited", particularly in the United States. Ambling gaits are smoother for a rider than either the two-beat trot or pace and most can be sustained for relatively long periods, making them particularly desirable for trail riding and other tasks where a rider must spend long periods in the saddle. Historically, horses able to amble were highly desired for riding long distances on poor roads. Once roads improved and carriage travel became popular, their use declined in Europe but continued in popularity in the Americas, particularly in areas where plantation agriculture was practiced and the inspection of fields and crops necessitated long daily rides.

The ability to perform an ambling gait is usually an inherited trait. In 2012, a DNA study found that horses from several gaited and harness racing breeds carried a mutation on the gene DMRT3, which controls the spinal neurological circuits related to limb movement and motion. In 2014, that mutation was found to originate in a single ancestor to all gaited horses. Some gaited breeds naturally perform these gaits from birth, others need to be trained to do them. Some breeds have individuals who can both amble and perform a trot or pace. In the Standardbred breed, the DMRT3 gene was also found in trotting horses, suggesting that it inhibits the ability to transition into a canter or gallop.

Though there are differences in footfall patterns and speed of the various gaits, historically they were collectively referred to as an "amble". The many different names for these gaits reflect the nuanced differences sought by aficionados of each particular breed, with traits considered desirable in one breed sometimes discouraged in another. Gaited breeds occur in many parts of the world, but are particularly prevalent in North and South America.

== History ==
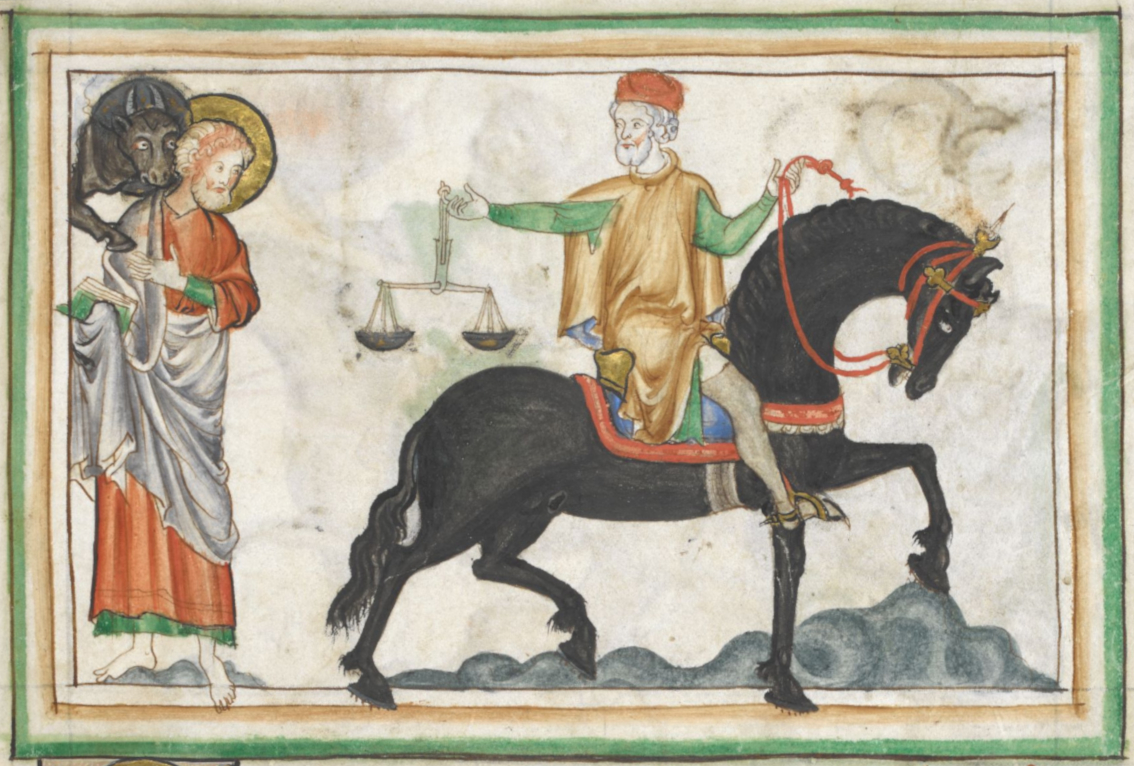
The ambling horse was prized in the Middle Ages

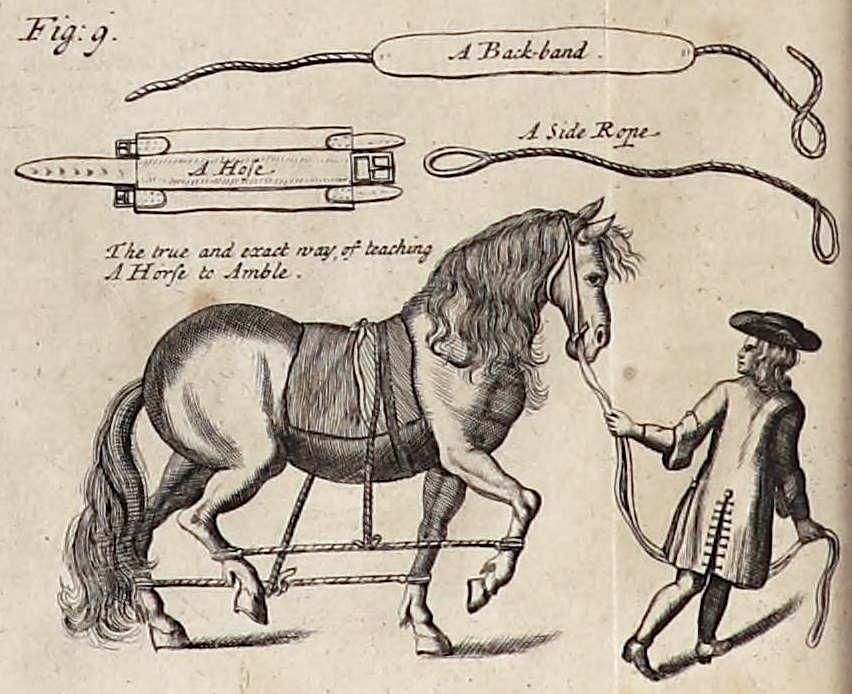
A horse's legs tied together using a device called a trammel to force a lateral ambling gait

Ambling was described as early as the Hittite writings of Kikkuli. The amble was particularly prized in horses in the Middle Ages due to the need for people to travel long distances on poor roads. The Old High German term for a gaited horse was celtari (Modern German Zelter), cognate to Icelandic tölt. English amble is a 14th-century loan from Old French, ultimately from Latin ambulare "to walk". Horse types with ambling ability included the valuable jennet and palfrey. By the 18th century, the amble was a topic of discussion among horse trainers in Europe, and the 1728 Cyclopedia discussed the lateral form of the gait, which is derived from the pace, and some of the training methods used to create it in a horse that did not appear to be naturally gaited.

As roads improved and carriage travel became more common, followed later by railroads, riding horses that trotted became more popular in Europe; the dominant uses of riding horses came to include light cavalry, fox hunting and other types of rapid travel across country, but of more limited duration, where the gallop could be used. The amble was still prized in the Americas, particularly in the southern United States and in Latin America where plantation agriculture required riders to cover long distances every day to view fields and crops. Today, ambling or gaited horses are popular amongst casual riders who seek soft-gaited, comfortable horses for pleasure riding.

As a general rule, while ambling horses are able to canter, they usually are not known for speed, nor is it particularly easy for them to transition from an ambling gait into the canter or gallop. Thus, in history, where comfort for long hours in the saddle was important, ambling horses were preferred for smoothness, sure-footedness and quiet disposition. However, when speed and quick action was of greater importance, horses that trotted were more suitable due to their speed and agility. When horses were used in warfare, particularly during the Middle Ages, it was not uncommon for a knight to ride an ambling horse to a battle site, then switch to a war horse for galloping into the actual battle.

== Types of ambling gaits ==
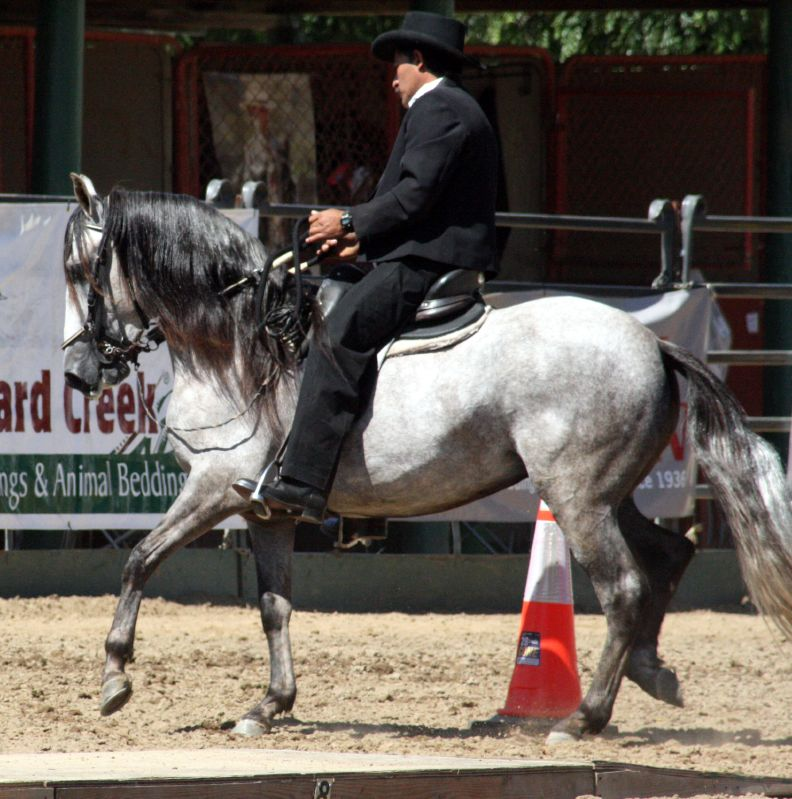
Paso Fino performing the "classic fino', a slow, isochronous lateral gait

All ambling gaits have four beats. Some ambling gaits are lateral gaits, meaning that the feet on the same side of the horse move forward, but one after the other, usually in a footfall pattern of right rear, right front, left rear, left front. Others are diagonal, meaning that the feet on opposite sides of the horse move forward in sequence, usually right rear, left front, left rear, right front. A common trait of the ambling gaits is that usually only one foot is completely off the ground at any one time. Ambling gaits are further distinguished by the timing and cadence of the footfall pattern. One distinction is whether the footfall rhythm is isochronous, four equal beats in a 1-2-3-4 rhythm; or a non-isochronous 1-2, 3-4 rhythm created by a slight pause between the groundstrike of the forefoot of one side to the rear of the other.

Many breeds of horses inherit the ability to perform these gaits, which may be observable naturally from birth or may present with a minimal amount of training. Some horses without apparent inborn gaited ability can be taught to "gait" or amble. However, training usually is not successful unless there is some inherited genetic ability in the horse. Ambling gaits can be taught by slightly restraining the horse at a trot or pace. The length of the stride is kept long, but the rider asks the horse to alter its balance to break up the two strides in such a manner to produce a four-beat gait. Sometimes, this effect is accidentally produced in an attempt to create the slow two-beat jog trot desired in western pleasure competition when the horse cannot sustain a slow jog and falls into a shuffling, four beat gait described as "trotting in front and walking behind," which is penalized in the show ring.

Some horses can both trot and amble, and some horses pace in addition to the amble instead of trotting. However, pacing in gaited horses is often, though not always, discouraged. Some horses neither trot nor pace easily, but prefer their ambling gait for their standard intermediate speed.

Conformation also plays a role. Horses with a longer back at the lumbosacral joint or "coupling" will find it easier to perform a lateral ambling gait, though they may also have to work harder to have proper collection. An average length back still allows a horse to perform ambling gaits, though a very short-coupled horse usually can only perform the trot. A well-laid back shoulder and somewhat horizontal hip angle favor a longer length of stride and is helpful in horses that fox trot, while a steeper shoulder angle combined with more sloping croup produce a stride more desirable in some lateral gaits such as the running walk.

A particular form of ambling gait considered desirable in one breed is often penalized in another. For example, the Missouri Foxtrotter is specifically bred to perform the fox trot, a diagonal ambling gait, while the Paso Fino is bred to perform lateral gaits and sometimes is penalized for a diagonal gait, which in that breed is called trocha.

== Heritability and breeding ==
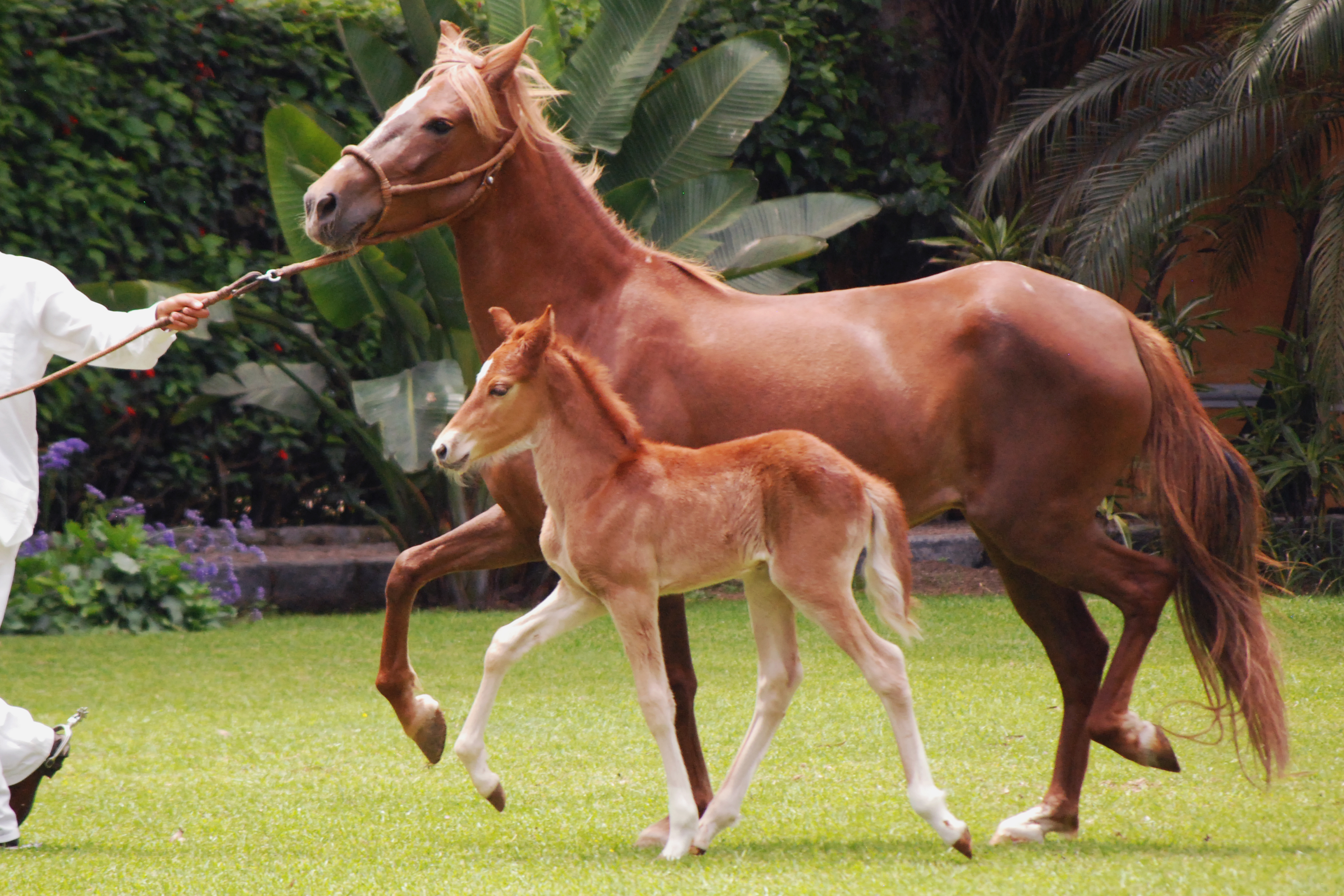
Gaitedness is generally inherited, as seen in this young, untrained Peruvian Paso foal

In most "gaited" breeds, an ambling gait is a hereditary trait. However, some representatives of these breeds may not always gait, and some horses of other breeds not considered "gaited" may have ambling-gaited ability, particularly with training. A 2012 DNA study of movement in Icelandic horses, harness racing horse breeds, and mice determined that a mutation on the gene DMRT3, which controls the spinal neurological circuits related to limb movement and motion, causes a premature stop codon in horses with lateral ambling gaits. This mutation may be a dominant gene, in that even one copy of the mutated allele will produce gaitedness. Horses who are homozygous for the gene may have a stronger gaited ability than those who are heterozygous. Horses can now be tested for the presence or absence of this allele. In 2012, the mutated gene was found in the Icelandic horse, the Tennessee Walking Horse, the Peruvian Paso, and the Kentucky Mountain Saddle Horse. In 2014, a new study of the DMRT3 gene, now dubbed the "gait keeper" gene, examined over 4000 horses worldwide and DNA study found that gaitedness originated in a single ancient domestic ancestor as a spontaneous genetic mutation. In 2016, a study of DMRT3 SNP in paleographic DNA located the ambling horse mutation to medieval England with subsequent spread by Vikings first to Iceland in the 10th century.

Breeds known for galloping ability, including the Thoroughbred and even the wild Przewalski’s horse, do not possess the mutated form of the gene.

A number of horse breeds have observed natural gaited tendencies, including the American Saddlebred, Boerperd, Icelandic horse, Missouri Fox Trotter, Paso Fino, Peruvian Paso, Racking horse, Rocky Mountain Horse, Spotted Saddle horse, and Tennessee Walking Horse. The two-beat lateral pace is also sometimes classified with the ambling gaits as an "alternate" gait, and may be linked to the same genetic mechanism as the lateral ambling gaits. The pacing horses studied were all homozygous for the DMTR3 mutation. But not all horses with the homozygous mutation could pace, suggesting other factors had to come into play for that gait to occur. Although ambling gaits are seen in some Mustangs, and other Colonial Spanish Horses, DMRT3 mutations are rarely seen in feral or wild horses. Researchers theorize that this is due to the difficulty that horses with this mutation have in moving from an ambling gait to a gallop, leading them to be easy prey for predators. Humans, however, have selectively bred for ambling horses, leading to a much more frequent occurrence of DMRT3 mutations among the human-bred horse population.

Of note is that the trotting bloodlines of the Standardbred, though distinct from the pacing bloodlines, also are homozygous for the DMRT3 mutation, suggesting that it not only affects lateral gaits, but inhibits the transition to a gallop. In the studies of Icelandic horses, those animals homozygous for the DMRT3 mutation scored poorly for their ability to both trot and gallop. Researchers concluded that breeders selected away from the mutation in horses bred for sports such as dressage, show jumping, and racing at a gallop.

== Lateral ambling gaits ==
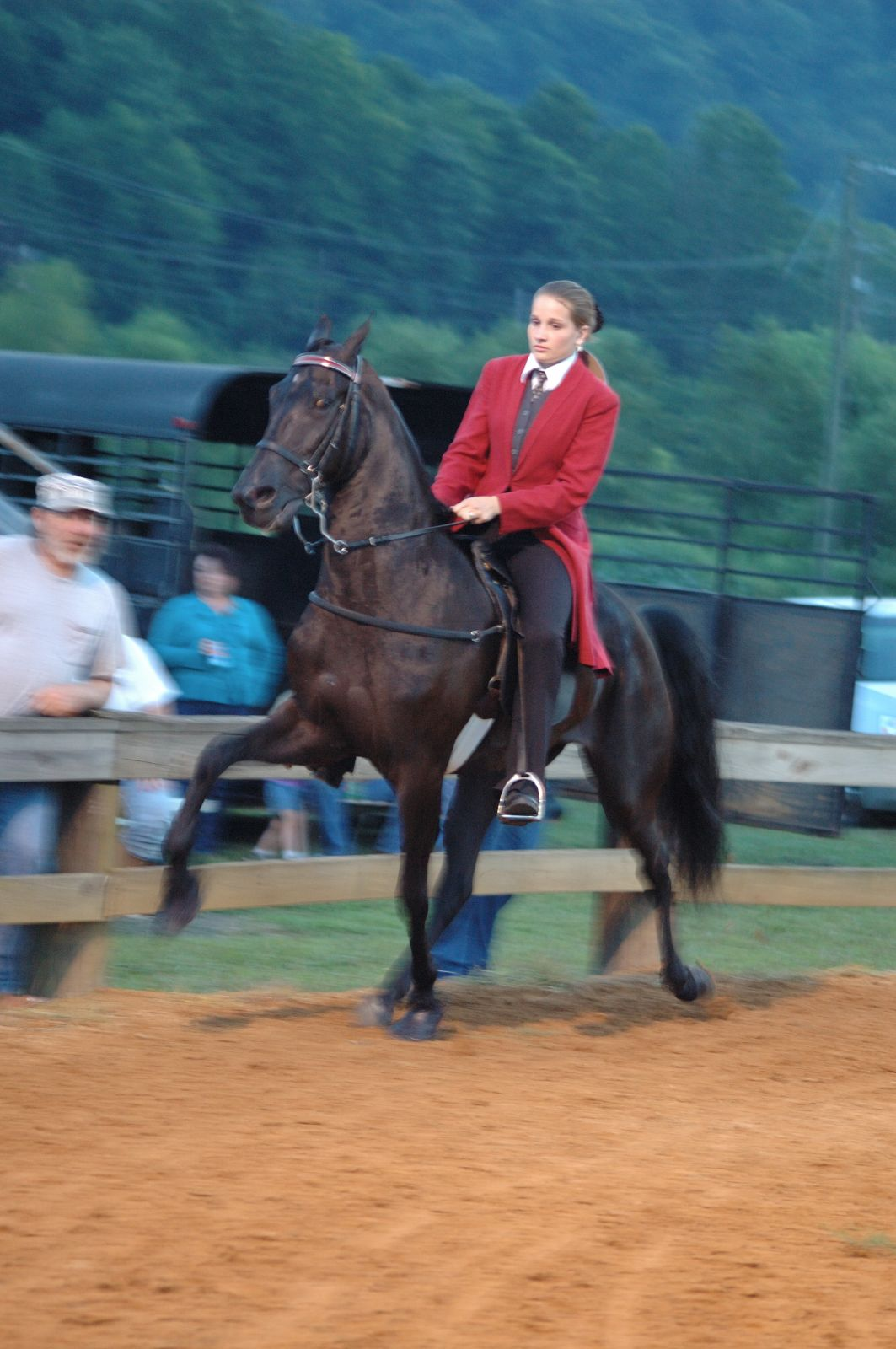
Tennessee Walking Horse at the running walk

Lateral gaits fall in the sequence right hind, right front, left hind, left front. They can be distinguished by whether the footfall rhythm is "even" or isochronous, four equal beats in a 1-2-3-4 rhythm; or non-isochronous, a slightly uneven 1–2, 3-4 rhythm created because the horse picks up and sets down its feet on each individual side slightly faster, creating a slight pause when switching to the opposite lateral pair of footfalls.

=== Running walk ===
The running walk is most often performed by Tennessee Walking Horses. It is a four-beat gait with the same footfall pattern as a regular, or flat, walk, but significantly faster. While a horse performing a flat walk moves at 4 to 8 miles per hour (6.4 to 12.9 km/h), the running walk allows the same horse to travel at 10 to 20 miles per hour (16 to 32 km/h). In the running walk, the horse's rear feet overstep the prints of its front feet by 6 to 18 inches (15 to 46 cm), with a longer overstep being more prized in the Tennessee Walking Horse breed. While performing the running walk, the horse nods its head in rhythm with its gait. Some Tennessee Walking Horses perform other variations of lateral ambling gaits, including the rack, stepping pace, fox trot and single-foot, which are allowable for pleasure riding but penalized in the show ring.

=== "Slow gaits" ===
The slow gait is a general term for several slower forms of the classic amble that follow the same general footfall pattern as the walk, in that lateral pairs of legs move forward in sequence, but the rhythm and collection of the movements are different. The common thread is that all are smooth gaits, comfortable to the rider. Terms for various slow gaits include the stepping pace and 'singlefoot'. Some slow gaits are natural to some horses, while others are developed from the pace. The stepping pace, sometimes itself called an "amble," is a slightly uneven lateral gait, with a non-isochronous 1–2, 3-4 sequence, while the singlefoot has an isochronous, even 1-2-3-4 rhythm. The stepping pace is faster than a running walk and extremely smooth, but not as energy-efficient. It is a smooth gait at slower speeds, but when sped up can turn into a 2-beat pace. The United States Equestrian Federation defines the slow gait as a restrained four-beat gait, "derived from the pace" and "not a medium rack".

=== Rack ===
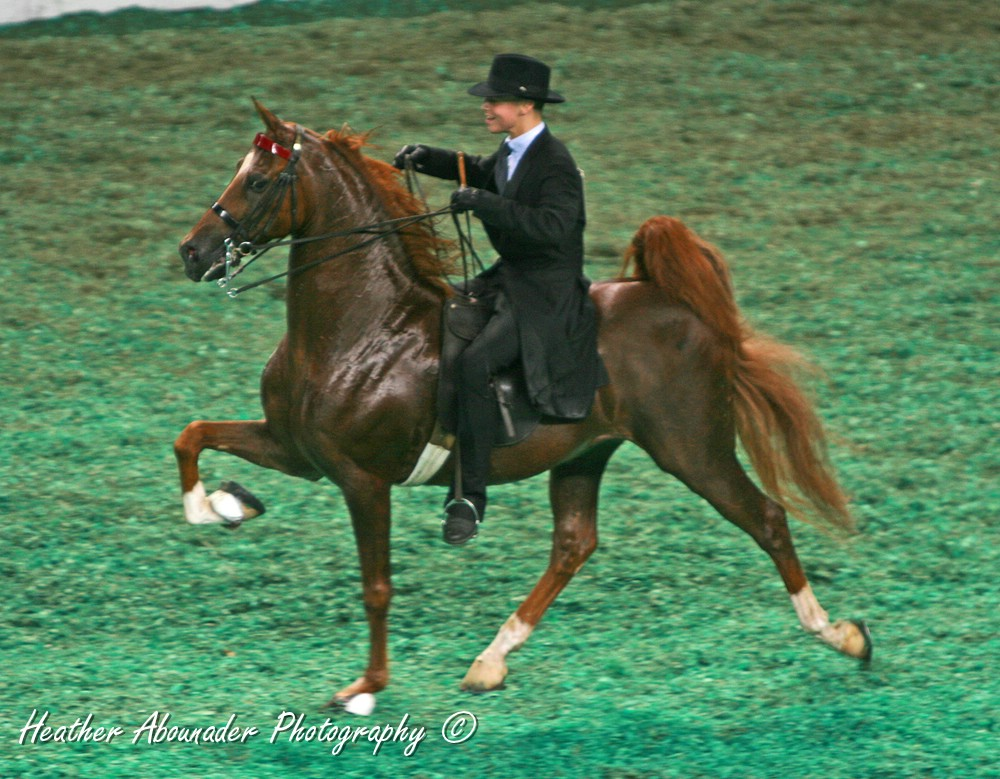
American Saddlebred performing the rack

The rack or racking is a gait that is also known as the singlefoot or single-foot. It is an even, lateral four-beat gait. Although many breeds of horses are capable of producing this gait, it is most commonly associated with the five-gaited American Saddlebred. In the rack, the speed of an even lateral slow gait is increased, while keeping the even intervals between each beat. In the American Saddlebred show ring, the gait is performed with speed and action, appearing unrestrained, while the slow gait is expected be performed with restraint and precision. The rack is also closely associated with the Racking Horse breed.

The rack, like other intermediate gaits, is smoother than the trot because the hooves hitting the ground individually rather than in pairs minimizes the force and bounce the horse transmits to the rider. To achieve this gait the horse must be in a "hollow position". This means that, instead of a rounded back as seen in dressage horses and others that work off their hind quarters, the spine is curved somewhat downward. This puts the racking horse in the best position to rack without breaking into another gait. If the rider sits back or leans slightly back, this will encourage the hollow position. This allows the hind legs to trail and makes the rack easier for the horse. The downside of this is that this position weakens the back and makes the horse less able to carry the weight of the rider without strain.

=== Tölt ===
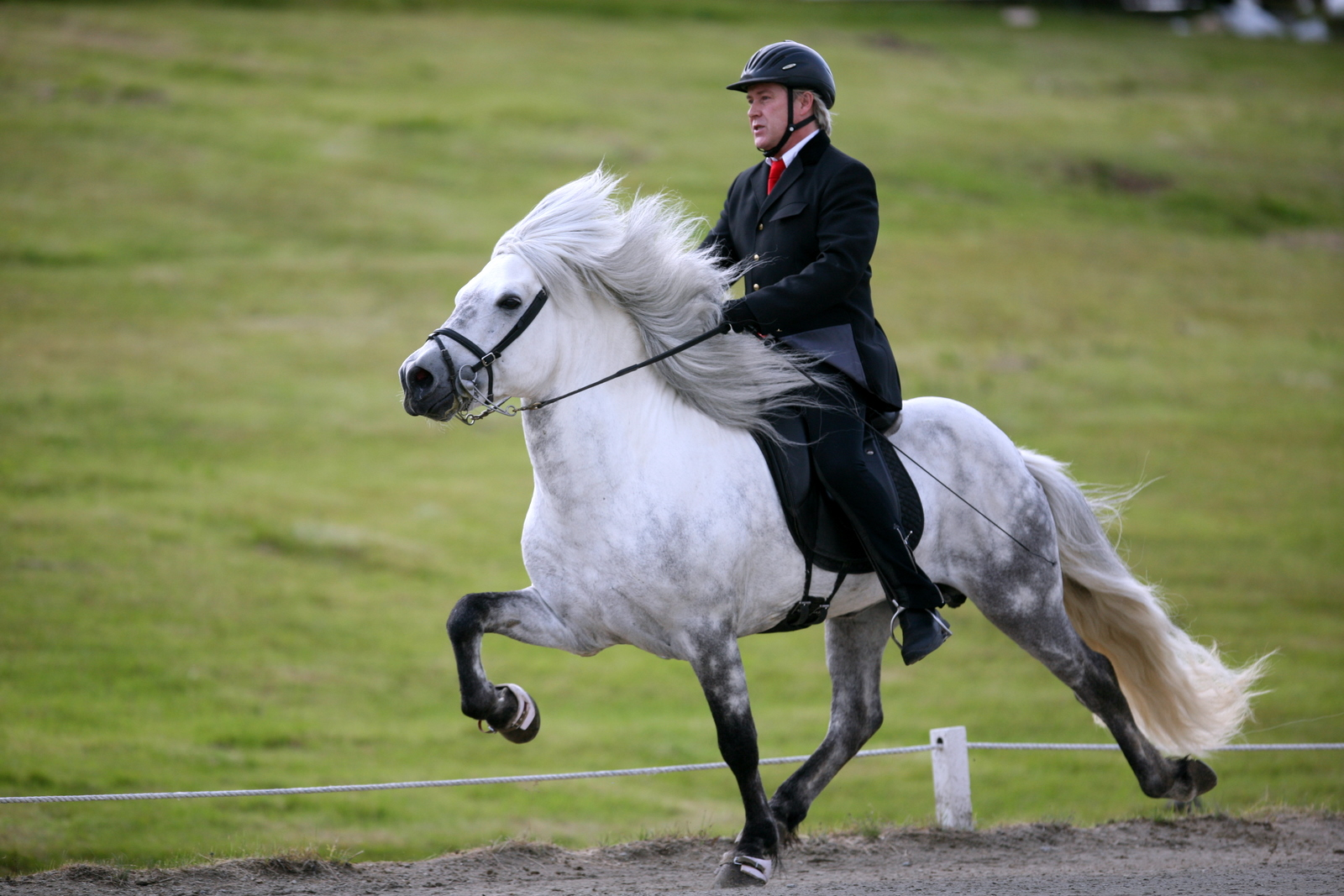
Icelandic horse at the tölt

The tölt is a four-beat lateral ambling gait mainly found in Icelandic horses. Known for its explosive acceleration and speed, it is also comfortable and ground-covering. There is considerable variation in style within the gait, and thus the tölt is variously compared to similar lateral gaits such as the rack of the Saddlebred, the largo of the Paso Fino, or the running walk of the Tennessee Walking Horse. Like all lateral ambling gaits, the footfall pattern is the same as the walk (left hind, left front, right hind, right front), but differs from the walk in that it can be performed at a range of speeds, from the speed of a typical fast walk up to the speed of a normal canter. Some Icelandic horses prefer to tölt, while others prefer to trot; correct training can improve weak gaits, but the tölt is a natural gait present from birth. Two varieties of the tölt are considered incorrect by breeders. The first is an uneven gait called a "pig's pace" or "piggy-pace" that is closer to a two-beat pace than a four-beat amble. The second is called a Valhopp and is a tölt and canter combination most often seen in untrained young horses or horses that mix their gaits. Both varieties are normally uncomfortable to ride. The Icelandic also performs a pace called a skeið, flugskeið or "flying pace". The horses with a strong natural ability to perform the tölt appear to be those which are heterozygous for the DMRT3 mutation.

The Faroese Horse and the Nordlandshest/Lyngshest of Norway share common ancestry with the Icelandic horse and some individuals of these breeds have the capacity to tölt, although it is not as commonly used.

=== Paso gaits ===
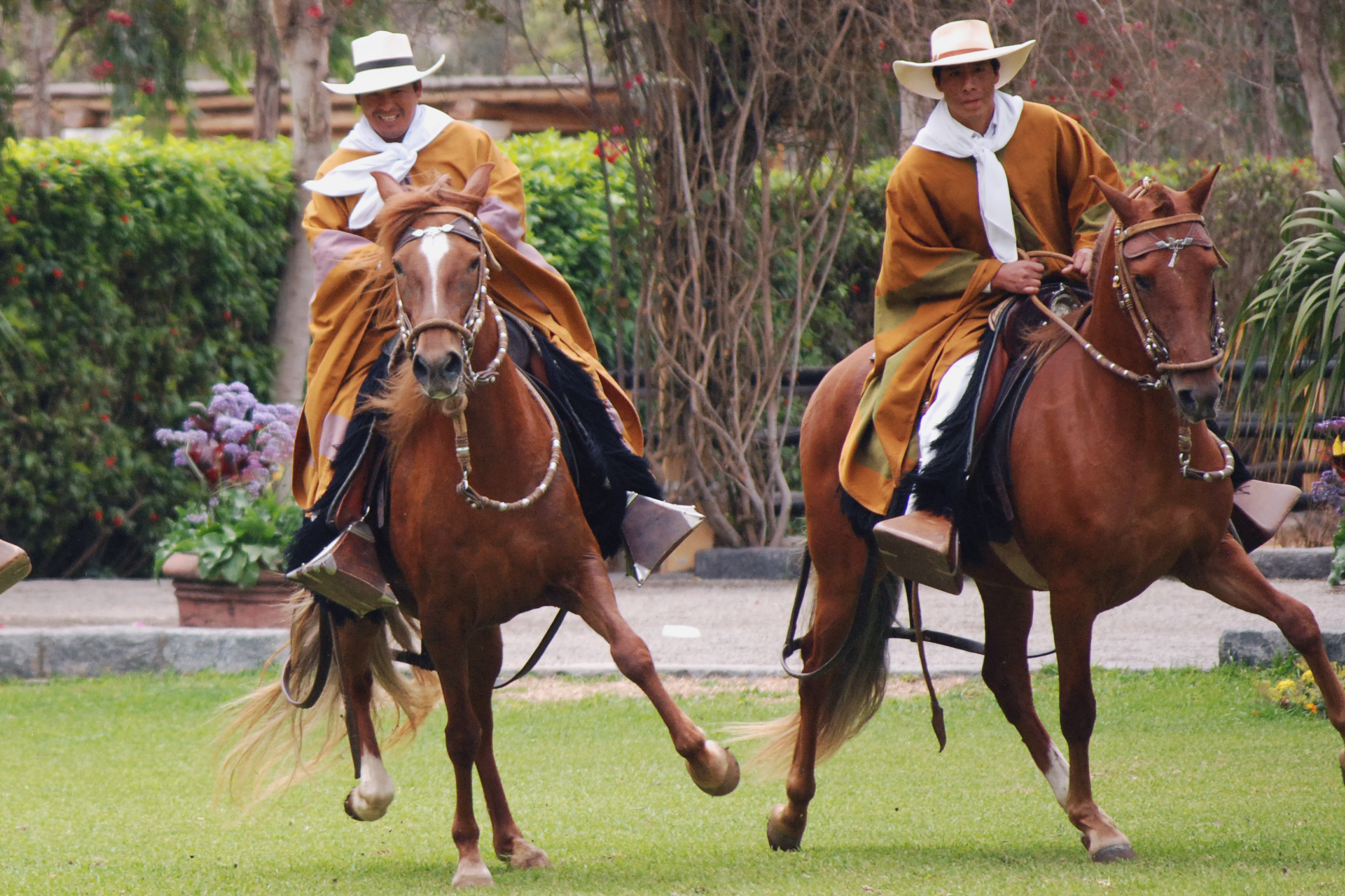
Peruvian Pasos demonstrating the lateral movement of the shoulder known as término

The Peruvian Paso and Paso Fino are two horse breeds developed in Latin America that have smooth innate intermediate gaits. Both descended from jennets that came to the Americas with the Spanish.

The Paso Fino has several speed variations called (from slowest to fastest) the paso fino, paso corto, and paso largo. All have an even 1-2-3-4 rhythm. The paso fino gait is very slow, performed mainly for horse show competition. Horses are ridden over a "fino strip", which is usually plywood set into the ground, so the judges can listen for absolute regularity of footfall. The paso corto is an ambling gait of moderate speed, similar to the singlefoot. The paso largo is similar to the rack and is the fastest speed exhibited by the breed. The speed is attained by extending the stride while maintaining cadence. Some Paso Finos may perform a diagonal gait known as trocha akin to the fox trot. Many Paso Fino trainers in the USA discourage their horses from using diagonal gaits, emphasizing the lateral gaits exclusively, though in Colombia, the diagonal gait is more often considered acceptable.

The Peruvian Paso has an even lateral gait known as the paso llano, which has the same footfall sequence as the running walk, and is characterized by an elongated and lateral motion of the shoulder known as término. The faster ambling gait of the Peruvian Paso is called the sobreandando and is slightly uneven, similar to the stepping pace. The Peruvian Paso may also fall into a diagonal gait, the pasitrote, as well as a pace-like gait, the huachano, both discouraged in the breed.

=== Other lateral ambling gaits ===
The Marwari and Kathiawari breeds of India often exhibit a natural lateral ambling gait, called the revaal, aphcal, or rehwal.

The Mangalarga Marchador performs the marcha picada, a four-beat lateral gait, similar to a stepping pace or singlefoot. The breed also performs a four-beat diagonal gait. The picada, which means "light touch" in Portuguese, is usually the smoother of the two ambling gaits performed by the breed, because the lateral movement creates little vertical momentum, and is similar to the paso llano of the Peruvian Paso.

== Diagonal ambling gaits ==
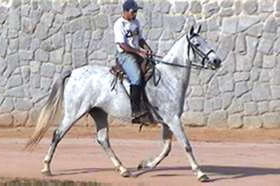
This Mangalarga Marchador is exhibiting a diagonal ambling gait

The only diagonal ambling gait is called the fox trot in English, though it is given other names in other countries. The diagonal footfalls are usually slightly uneven, occurring in "couplets" of a 1–2, 3-4 rhythm that gives the rider a slight forward and back sensation when riding. They are considered physically easier on the horse than the lateral gaits as less hollowing of the back occurs when the horse is in the gait. Diagonal four beat gaits are classified as an alternative ambling gait, even though derived from the trot rather than the pace. The genetic mechanism that allows diagonal ambling gaits appears to be the same gene responsible for lateral ambling gaits.

The fox trot is most often associated with the Missouri Fox Trotter breed, but is also seen in other breeds. The fox trot is a four-beat broken diagonal gait in which the front foot of the diagonal pair lands before the hind, eliminating the moment of suspension and giving a smooth ride said to also be sure-footed. The gait is sometimes described as having the horse walk with the front feet and trot with the back. In a fox trot, the horse must keep one front foot on the ground at all times and display a sliding motion with the hind legs. Other gaited breeds are able to perform the fox trot and it is one of the only ambling gaits that can be taught to horses that are not naturally gaited. The gait creates an optical illusion that a horse is walking in front and trotting behind.

The Mangalarga Marchador performs the marcha batida, where the feet move diagonally, in a manner similar to a fox trot, but with a brief period of quadrupedal support where all four feet are planted. Batida means "to hit". The Carolina Marsh Tacky, another breed with Spanish heritage, exhibits a four-beat diagonal ambling gait comparable to the marcha batida.

The trocha gait of the Paso Fino and the pasitrote of the Peruvian Paso are also diagonal ambling gaits. They too are similar to the fox trot, though the trocha has shorter steps than the fox trot and is about the same speed as the lateral paso corto. The trocha is more commonly seen in the Colombian strains of the Paso Fino.

== Sources ==
- Bennett, Deb (1998). Conquerors: The Roots of New World Horsemanship (1st ed.). Amigo Publications. ISBN 978-0965853309.
- Bongianni, Maurizio, ed. (1988). Horses and Ponies of the World. Simon & Schuster's Guide To. New York City: Simon & Schuster. ISBN 978-0671660680.
- Dutson, Judith (2005). Storey's Illustrated Guide to 96 Horse Breeds of North America. Storey Publishing. pp. 160–4. ISBN 978-1-58017-612-5.
- Edwards, Elwyn Hartley (1994). The Encyclopedia of the Horse (1st American ed.). New York City: Dorling Kindersley. ISBN 978-1-56458-614-8.
- Hendricks, Bonnie (1995). International Encyclopedia of Horse Breeds. University of Oklahoma Press. ISBN 978-0-8061-3884-8. OL 7940192M.
- Howe, Anita (2011). Freedom to Gait: Release Your Horse Into Natural Easy-Gait. AuthorHouse. ISBN 9781456716165.
- Ziegler, Lee (2005). Easy-Gaited Horses: Gentle, Humane Methods for Training and Riding Gaited Pleasure Horses. Storey Publishing. ISBN 9781580175623.
