= List of horses of the American Civil War =

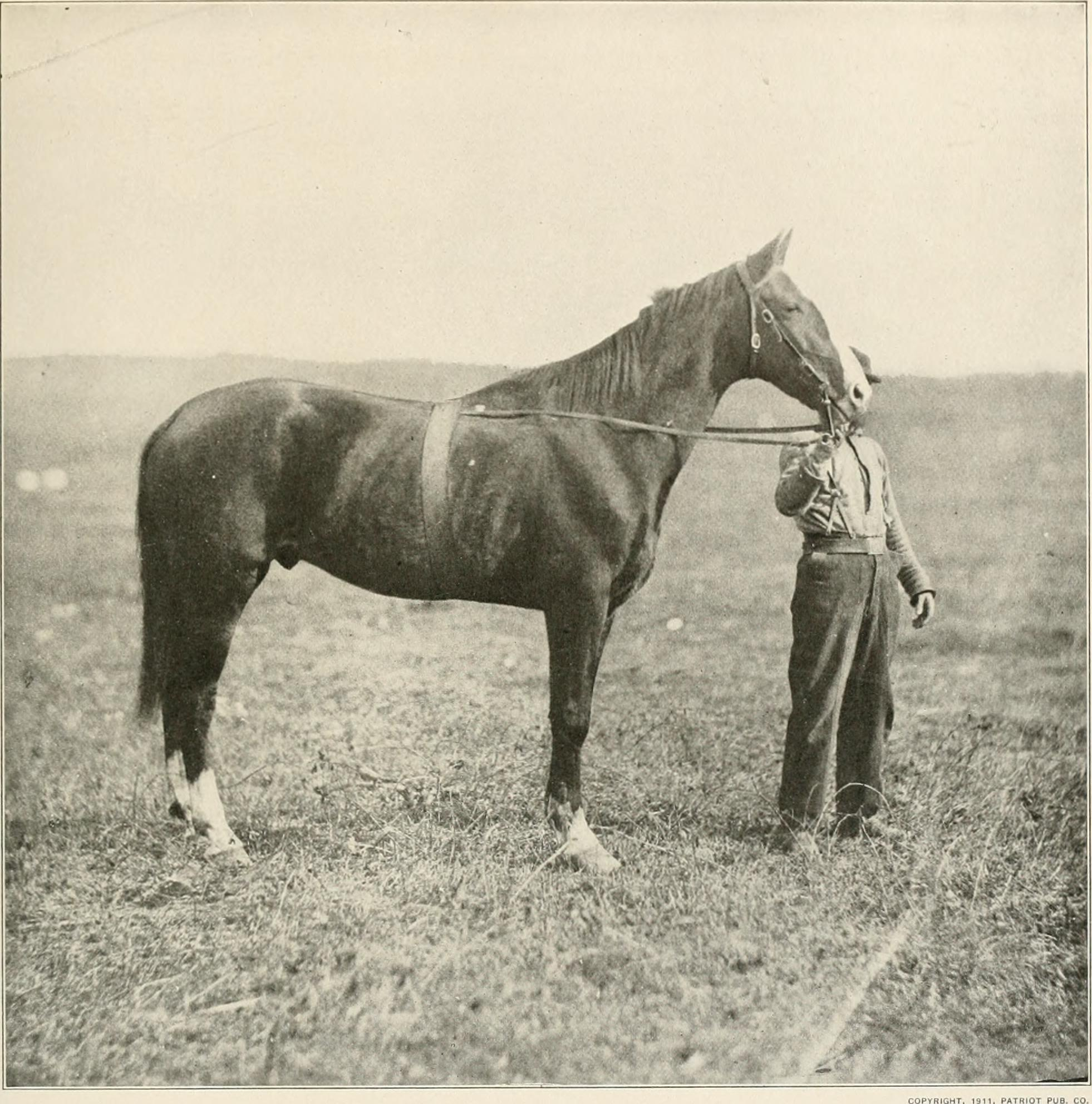
General George Meade's Old Baldy

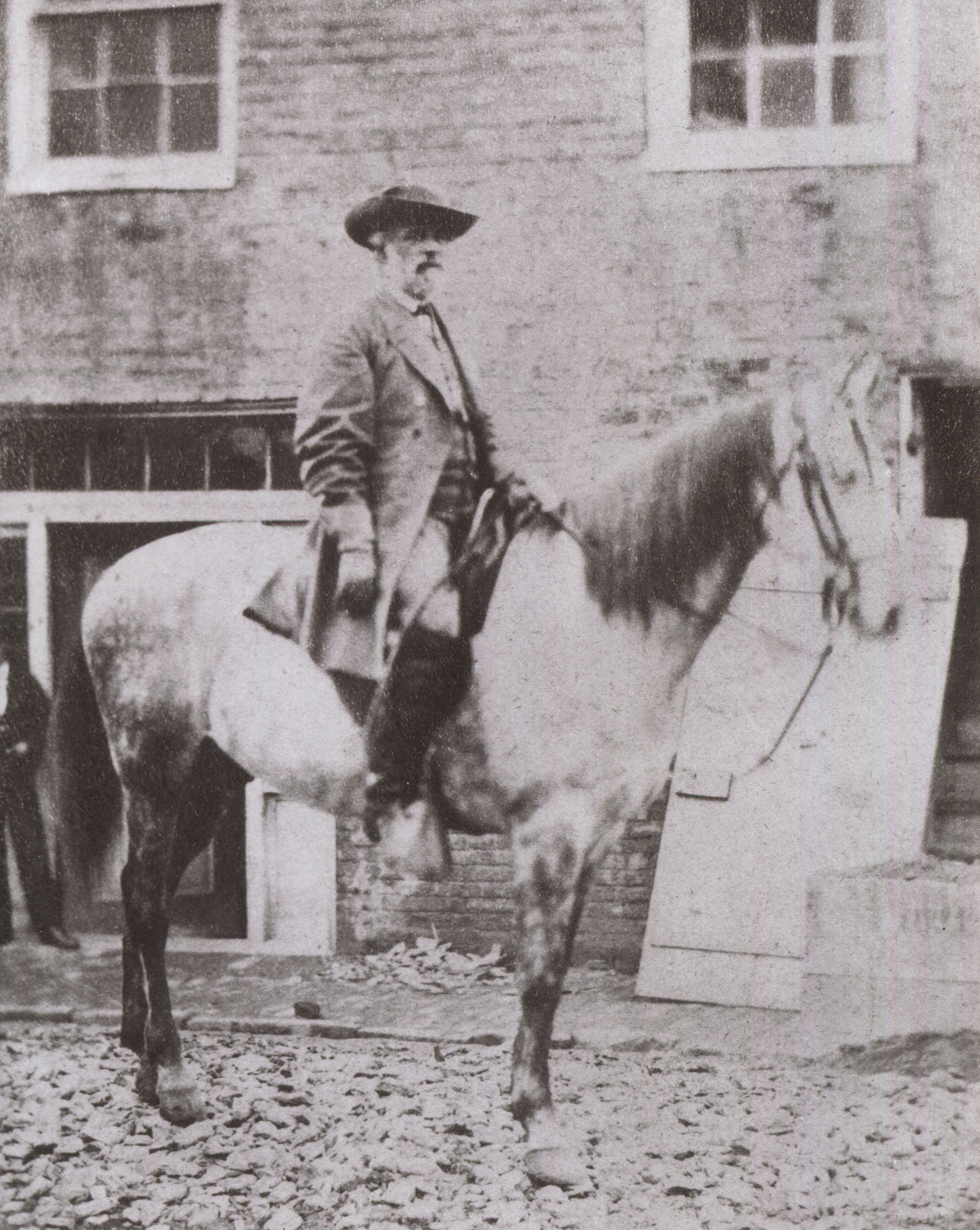
General Robert E. Lee on Traveller

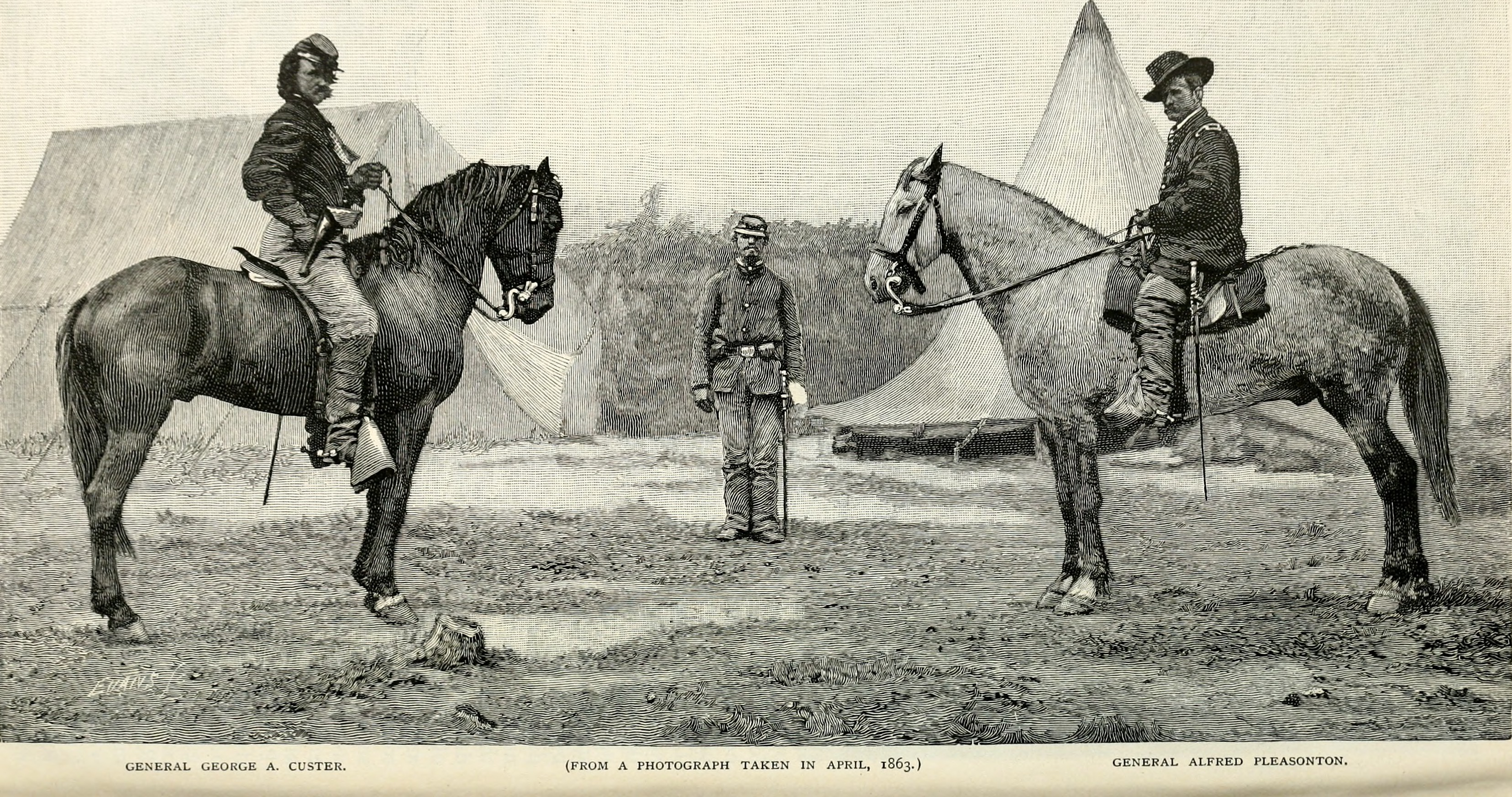
Generals George Armstrong Custer and Alfred Pleasonton with their horses, 1863

More than three million horses were used by the Union and Confederate Armies in the American Civil War. These horses provided transportation, gave a better view of the battlefield, helped deliver communications between the troops and commanders, and were a symbol of authority to the troops. The American Saddlebred, Morgan, and Thoroughbred breeds were the most popular for warhorses during the Civil War.

Cavalry regiments used the most horses during the war. The 206 Confederate and 137 Union cavalry regiments required at least 1,200 horses each, with all upper officers allowed three horses and each lieutenant allowed two horses. Regiments also needed extra horses to replace animals lost in battle or that became tired while marching. On average, each cavalry member had four or more replacement horses in addition to their original mount. Generals required a supply of fresh horses to move through the battlefield rapidly.Thus, the 425 Confederate and 583 Union generals needed at least 4,032 horses at all times.

The 636 Confederate and Union artillery batteries each required around 120 horses, most importantly the six horses needed to move each gun. Robert E. Lee's Order No. 155, issued on October 1, 1862, detailed the care of Confederate horses, assigned responsibility for artillery horses, and listed punishments for neglect. William Tecumseh Sherman issued similar ordered to the Union, with each artillery horse receiving twelve pounds of grain and fourteen of hay each day. However, required food and water were not always available.

Between 1.2 and 1.5 million horses died in active service during the war, or roughly fifty percent. Like their riders, horses died from diseases and combat wounds; some also succumbed to starvation. It was common for accounts of commanders and generals to note, "his horse was shot out from beneath him". Eleven of cavalry commander George Armstrong Custer's horses died, 24 of General Philip Sheridan's horses, and 39 of Nathan Bedford Forrest's horses. On some occasions, soldiers were ordered to kill exhausted horses rather than to leave them behind for enemy troops. The average life expectancy of a cavalry horse during the Civil War was four months, while an artillery horse averaged seven and a half months.

For the Union troops, the United States Army Quartermaster Corps was responsible for procuring horses, under the leadership of Brigadier General Montgomery C. Meigs. There was also a Confederate Quartermaster-General's Department. However, many of the officers on both sides and Confederate cavalrymen road their personal horses in a policy of "self mounting". Confederate soldiers were paid forty cents a day for the use of their horse. Both sides frequently used formal impressment of horses, leaving a receipt with owners, who could claim future payment for their horses.

Depending on their role, military horses required specific characteristics; cavalry horses needed to be able to ride in synchrony with other horses, follow their rider's instructions, and tolerate battle sounds. Most horses even learned bugle calls and would respond to them without an additional prompt from their rider. However, the horses had a harder time learning to move in tight formations and to ignore the sights and sounds of a battle. Many soldiers also described horses that had behavioral issues, such as biting, kicking, and running off with their riders. Horse historian Earl J. Hess notes that some of this misbehavior may have been related to wartime trauma.

At the end of the war, Union General Ulysses S. Grant agreed to Confederate General Robert E. Lee's terms of surrender, which included allowing Confederate soldiers to keep their personal horses so that they would be able to farm and plant spring crops once they returned home.

There are memorials dedicated to the Civil War horses in Middleburg, Virginia; Fort Riley, Kansas; Four Oaks, North Carolina; and Murfreesboro, Tennessee. In addition, many of the memorial statues of Civil War notables are depicted on horseback. Robert E. Lee on Traveller is a bronze sculpture by Alexander Phimister Proctor that was formerly installed at Turtle Creek Park in Dallas, Texas. Cavalry Charge by Henry Merwin Shrady and the Ulysses S. Grant Memorial by Henry Shrady both depict General Grant on horseback.

Following is a list of named horses and the notable Union and Confederate soldiers or operatives who rode them during the Civil War.

== List of horses ==
Horse	Breed	Soldier or operative	Notes	Ref.
Ajax		Robert E. Lee	Ajax was reportedly too large for Lee to ride comfortably and was therefore used infrequently.	
Aldebaron		Philip Sheridan	Sheridan's first horse.	
Almond Eye		Benjamin Butler		
Bayard		Philip Kearny	Kearny's secondary horse; Kearny was killed at Chantilly while riding this horse.	
Bill		Henry J. Hunt		
Billy		George H. Thomas	Named for William T. Sherman.	
Black Auster		William J. Hardee		
Black Bess		John Hunt Morgan		
Blackie		George Meade	Meade's secondary horse.	
Blackjack		Jefferson Davis		
Blue Devil		Richard L. T. Beale	Horse was shot in the head during the Battle of Reams Station	
Bob		Charles Russell Lowell		
Bob		Charles D. Pennebaker	Subject of the poem "My War-Horse Bob".	
Bob		John Sedgwick	Used during the Peninsula Campaign.	
Boney		William Rosecrans	This horse was Rosecrans' favorite and was used during the Battle of Chickamauga. It is featured in the Major General William Starke Rosecrans Memorial in Sunbury, Ohio.	
Bony		Charles H. Larrabee		
Boomerang		John McArthur		
Brown Roan (aka The Roan)		Robert E. Lee	One of Lee's secondary horses, Brown Roan, went blind in 1862 and had to be retired	
Bucephalus		Sterling Price	Named after the horse of Alexander the Great	
Bullet		J. E. B. Stuart	This bay was given to Stuart, who passed it to McClellan on his deathbed.	
Bullet		George B. McClellan	This bay was given to Stuart, who passed it to McClellan on his deathbed.	
Bully		Philip St. George Cooke	This was his favorite horse.	
Burns (aka Black Burns)		George B. McClellan	McClellan's secondary horse, named for Brigadier General William Wallace Burns.	
Burnside		Orlando B. Willcox		
Butler		Matthew Butler	General Matthew Butler gave this bay to Hampton. Hampton won a jumping contest with the horse near the end of the war.	
Butler		Wade Hampton	General Matthew Butler gave this bay to Hampton. Hampton won a jumping contest with the horse near the end of the war.	
Caesar		Henry Gray		
Captain		Wade Hampton	Used in the Battle of Brandy Station.	
Captain		Thomas Kilby Smith		
Chancellor		J. E. B. Stuart	This was a borrowed horse that received a fatal wound at the Battle of Chancellorsville while Stuart was riding it.	
Charlemagne		Joshua Chamberlain		
Charlie		Oliver Otis Howard		
Chickamauga		Alfred Jefferson Vaughan Jr.		
Cincinnati	Thoroughbred	Ulysses S. Grant	Grant's favorite and most famous horse, acquired in 1864; most paintings of and memorials to Grant depict him astride Cincinnati, including the Ulysses S. Grant Memorial at the base of Capitol Hill. It was used during the 1864 Overland Campaign and was ridden by President Abraham Lincoln at City Point, Virginia. It lived in the White House stables when Grant was president.	
Cincinnatius		John B. Magruder		
Clayback (aka Old Yellow)		Ulysses S. Grant		
Cornwall		John Sedgwick	Sedgwick's secondary horse.	
Custis Lee		George Armstrong Custer		
Dan		Richard L. T. Beale		
Dan		Alexander Hays	The horse was killed in the Battle of Gettysburg.	
Dandy		George Armstrong Custer		
Dan Webster		George B. McClellan	McClellan's favorite horse, named after Daniel Webster, was used during the Battle of Antietam.	
Decatur		Philip Kearny	Kearny's secondary horse, shot through the neck at the Battle of Fair Oaks.	
Dick		James Postell Douglas		
Dick		Frank A. Haskell	The horse was killed in the Battle of Gettysburg.	
Dick Turpin		T. J. Goree		
Dixie		Edward Porter Alexander	The horse was injured at the Battle of Gettysburg and the Battle of Spotsylvania Court House, but survived.	
Dixie		Patrick Cleburne	The horse was killed at the Battle of Perryville.	
Dixie		Henry Kyd Douglas		
Dixie		Fitzhugh Lee		
Dixie		Lewis Henry Little		
Dolly		William T. Sherman	Sherman's secondary horse.	
Don Juan		George Armstrong Custer	Custer stole this racehorse sixteen days after Lee had surrendered and rode it into Washington, D.C. during the Grand Review of the Armies.	
Duke		William T. Sherman	In a letter in 1888, Sherman wrote that his favorite horse throughout the war was the one he rode in Atlanta.	
Duke		Stephen Dodson Ramseur		
Ebony		Benjamin Butler		
Eclipse		Daniel Sickles	Given to General Daniel Birney by Major General Daniel Sickles. Was later part of Birney's funeral procession.	
Eclipse		David B. Birney	Given to General Daniel Birney by Major General Daniel Sickles. Was later part of Birney's funeral procession.	
Egypt		Ulysses S. Grant	One of many secondary horses used by Grant, this horse was named for the southern region of Illinois, nicknamed "Little Egypt" or "Egypt". It lived in the White House stables when Grant was president.	
Excelsior		Nelson A. Miles	The horse was fatally injured at Antietam.	
Fan		William Dorsey Pender		
Fancy		John F. Reynolds	Reynolds was riding this black stallion when he was killed at Gettysburg.	
Fanny		John Gibbon	Used in Gettysburg. Possibly named for Gibbon's wife.	
Fasco		Felix Salm-Salm		
Faugh-a-Ballagh		Patrick Kelly		
Faugh-a-Ballagh		William Haines Lytle	The horse was killed at the Battle of Carnifex Ferry when a ball passed through Lytle's leg and into the horse.	
Fink		Earl Van Dorn		
Fire-Eater		Albert Sidney Johnston	Johnston was riding the horse when he was killed at the Battle of Shiloh; the horse was injured but survived.	
Firefly		Robert E. Rodes		
Fleeter		Belle Boyd		
Fleetfoot		Walter H. Taylor		
Fly-By-Night		James Longstreet	A gift from General Robert E. Lee in 1864.	
4th Alabama		William H. C. Whiting	Named for the infantry unit that gave the horse to General Whiting.	
Fox		Ulysses S. Grant	Grant's primary horse, used at the Battle of Shiloh and the Battle of Fort Donelson.	
Francis Marion		Galusha Pennypacker	The horse was shot and killed while Pennypacker was riding it.	
Frank		Cullen A. Battle		
Frank		James A. Beaver		
Frantic		W. H. F. Lee		
Gaines' Denmark	Saddlebred		One of the horses serving in the command of General John Hunt Morgan. It became a "foundation progenitor" of the American Saddlebred horse	-
Gauley (aka Old Gauley)		Alexander W. Reynolds		
General		J. E. B. Stuart	J. E. B. Stuart was riding this horse when he received a fatal wound and gave the horse to Major Andrew Venable.	
General		Andrew Reid Venable	J. E. B. Stuart was riding this horse when he received a fatal wound and gave the horse to Major Andrew Venable.	
General Blair		John Aaron Rawlins	Named for General Francis Preston Blair Jr.	
General Shaler (aka Abe)		Alexander Shaler	This horse was used by generals in both the Union and Confederate Armies.	
General Shaler (aka Abe)		John B. Gordon	This horse was used by generals in both the Union and Confederate Armies.	
General Shaler (aka Abe)		John I. Curtin	This horse was used by generals in both the Union and Confederate Armies.	
George		J. E. B. Stuart		
George M. Patchen (aka Patchen)	Thoroughbred	Lafayette C. Baker	Before the war, this was a successful racehorse. It was the subject of a Currier and Ives print.	
Gertie		George Meade	Meade's secondary horse.	
Gim Crack		Francis Lubbock		
Glencoe		John Hunt Morgan	The horse was used by both Confederate and Union generals.	
Glencoe		James M. Shackelford	The horse was used by both Confederate and Union generals.	
Glencoe		Winfield Scott	The horse was used by both Confederate and Union generals.	
Grand Old Canister		Daniel Sickles	One of Sickles' secondary horses.	
Grape		Daniel Sickles	One of Sickles' secondary horses.	
Grey Eagle		John Buford	The horse took part in Buford's funeral procession.	
Handsome Joe		John Sedgwick	Sedgwick's secondary horse, used in the Battle of Gettysburg.	
Hardtimes		Ellison Capers		
Harry		George Armstrong Custer	One of Custer's secondary horses.	
Harry		Patrick Robert Guiney		
Harry Hays		Leroy Augustus Stafford	The horse was named for Major Harry T. Hays.	
Hero		James Longstreet		
Highfly (aka Highflier)		J. E. B. Stuart	Stuart's favorite horse; was shot and killed while Stuart was riding it.	
Highlander		Nathan Bedford Forrest	Was killed at the Battle of Chickamauga.	
Jack		Ulysses S. Grant	One of many secondary horses used by Grant through the Battle of Chickamauga	
Jack		Joseph Wheeler		
Jack Hinton		Thomas Francis Meagher		
Jack Rucker		George Armstrong Custer		
Jasper		Robert H. Milroy	The horse was fatally wounded during the Battle of Mill Creek.	
Jeff Davis (aka Old Jeff)		John Bell Hood	Hood's favorite horse	
Jeff Davis	Canadian	Ulysses S. Grant	One of many secondary horses used by Grant. It lived in the White House stables when Grant was president.	
Jennie		Sullivan Ballou	Killed at the Battle of First Bull Run.	
Jerry		Leonidas Polk		
Jess		Cyrus Hamlin		
Jinny		Isaac R. Trimble		
Joe Johnston		States Rights Gist	Was shot at the Battle of Franklin	
Joe Smith		Stovepipe Johnson	Johnson used this horse before, during, and after the war.	
John		Thomas Leonidas Crittenden		
John (aka Old John)		Lewis Wallace		
John Dillard	Saddlebred	John Hunt Morgan	An important progenitor in the American Saddlebred and trotting horses	
Josh		William T. Poague	Poague rode Josh to escape after the Battle of Sailor's Creek	
Jubal Early		Roger A. Pryor		
Kangaroo		Ulysses S. Grant	The horse was given to Col. Lagow as a joke, as it was deemed "good-for-nothing". Grant offered to take the horse from his staff members and used it as one of his secondary horses.	
Kangaroo		Clark B. Lagow	The horse was given to Col. Lagow as a joke, as it was deemed "good-for-nothing". Grant offered to take the horse from his staff members and used it as one of his secondary horses.	
Kate		Elisha Hunt Rhodes		
Kentuck		George B. McClellan	McClellan's favorite horse.	
King Philip		Nathan Bedford Forrest	Forrest's favorite horse after the death of Roderick.	
Lady Margarve		J. E. B. Stuart	This horse was lost during the Chambersburg Raid.	
Lexington	Thoroughbred	William T. Sherman	This was the sire of General Grant's horse Cincinnati	
Lily of the Valley (aka Lilly of the Valley)	Thoroughbred	J. E. B. Stuart	A gift of Major James Thomas Watt Hairston, this horse was named for Lilly Danridge.	
Little Billy		Henry J. Madill		
Little Sorrel (aka Old Sorrel)	Morgan	Stonewall Jackson	Jackson was fatally wounded while riding Little Sorrel at the Battle of Chancellorsville. The horse lived at the Virginia Military Institute (VMI) for the last three years of its life, dying at age 36 in 1886. When it died, the horse was mounted and displayed. In 1997, Little Sorrel was cremated and buried on the VMI parade deck adjacent to Jackson's statue.	
Lively		Hugh Judson Kilpatrick		
Lookout		Joseph Hooker	Named after the Battle of Lookout Mountain.	
Lucy		George Pickett		
Lucy Long		J. E. B. Stuart	A gift from J. E. B. Stuart to Robert E. Lee, this was the primary backup horse used by Lee. After the war, it was used by Lee's daughters.	
Lucy Long		Robert E. Lee	A gift from J. E. B. Stuart to Robert E. Lee, this was the primary backup horse used by Lee. After the war, it was used by Lee's daughters.	
Maggie		Richard S. Ewell	Killed while Ewell was riding it during the Battle of Mechanicsville	
Major		Ambrose Burnside	When the horse, which survived the war, had to be put down due to age, Burnside could not bring himself to do it, so he asked a friend.	
Manassas		Orlando B. Willcox	This horse was killed during the Battle of Antietam	
Mary	Canadian	Robert H. Hatton	The horse led Hatton's funeral procession.	
Maryland		Robert E. Rodes		
Mayre		John B. Gordon	Acquired after a Union officer was shot off of it	
Mazeppa		J. E. B. Stuart	The horse was given to Major Fitzhugh because Mrs. Stuart did not like it.	
Mazeppa		Norman R. Fitzhugh	The horse was given to Major Fitzhugh because Mrs. Stuart did not like it.	
Meg Merrilies (aka Meg)		Edward Porter Alexander	This was Alexander's spare horse	
Methuselah		Ulysses S. Grant	Grant's first horse upon re-enlisting in the Army in 1861.	
Milroy		John B. Gordon	The horse was captured from Union General Robert H. Milroy at Second Winchester in 1863 and subsequently named after him.	
Moscow		Philip Kearny	Kearny's favorite horse	
My Maryland (aka Maryland)		J. E. B. Stuart	This horse was given to Stuart by his Maryland troops.	
Nellie Gray		Fitzhugh Lee	Killed at the Battle of Opequon.	
Old Abe		Elisha Hunt Rhodes		
Old Baldy (aka Baldy)		George Meade	Meade's favorite horse, which was at the Battle of Gettysburg, First Bull Run, and Antietam and was wounded fourteen times in battle. After its death, the horse's head and neck were mounted and are now housed at the Civil War Museum of Philadelphia.	
Old Billy		George Meade		
Old Isham		Benjamin F. Cheatham	Named after Isham Harris, the Confederate governor of Tennessee.	
Old Jim		Strong Vincent		
Old Spot		Hugh Judson Kilpatrick		
Parson Brownlow		George G. Dibrell	This was Dibrell's favorite horse, which was named for Parson Brownlow, a famous unionist politician from Tennessee.	
Plug Ugly		Alpheus S. Williams		
Pretty		David McMurtie Gregg		
Prince		Cullen A. Battle		
Prince		Joshua Chamberlain		
Rambler		John Sedgwick	Sedgwick's favorite horse	
Red Eye		Richard B. Garnett		
Red Pepper		Patrick Cleburne		
Richmond		Robert E. Lee	Richmond died in 1862 after the Battle of Malvern Hill.	
Rienzi (later Winchester)	Morgan	Philip Sheridan	Originally named for its birthplace in Rienzi, Mississippi, the horse was renamed after Sheridan's famous ride at the Battle of Winchester. When the horse died in 1878, it was mounted and given to the military museum on Governor's Island in New York City. It has been housed at the National Museum of American History since World War I.	
Rifle		Richard S. Ewell		
Roderick		Nathan Bedford Forrest	Forrest's favorite horse.	
Sam		William T. Sherman	Sherman's secondary horse.	
Shiloh		Daniel Ruggles		
Skylark		J. E. B. Stuart		
Slicky		Alfred Pleasonton		
Tammany		Daniel Sickles	Sickles' favorite horse.	
Tartar		James Stewart	Served with the artillery at the Second Battle of Manassas, where the horse survived being wounded in both hips and lost his tail to a shell blast. Later, it was used in the Battle of Fredericksburg.	
Tobey		William Rosecrans	Ridden during the Battle of Chickamaunga	
Tom Telegraph		Turner Ashby		
Traveller	Saddlebred	Joseph M. Broun	Broun, a member of 3rd Infantry in Western Virginia, purchased Jeff Davis and renamed it Greenbrier. Lee purchased what became his favorite horse from Broun in 1862 and renamed it Traveller. Traveller died a few months after Lee in 1871, and was later buried beside him at Lee Chapel in Lexington, Virginia.	
Traveller	Saddlebred	Robert E. Lee	Broun, a member of 3rd Infantry in Western Virginia, purchased Jeff Davis and renamed it Greenbrier. Lee purchased what became his favorite horse from Broun in 1862 and renamed it Traveller. Traveller died a few months after Lee in 1871, and was later buried beside him at Lee Chapel in Lexington, Virginia.	
Virginia		J. E. B. Stuart	Stuart rode this horse in the Gettysburg campaign.	
Warren		Bryan Grimes	Pulled Grimes' coffin during his funeral procession.	
Yorkshire		Alpheus S. Williams		

== See also ==
- Cavalry in the American Civil War
- Horsemanship of Ulysses S. Grant
- Horses in warfare
- List of historical horses
