= Kentucky Mountain Saddle Horse =

Breed of horse

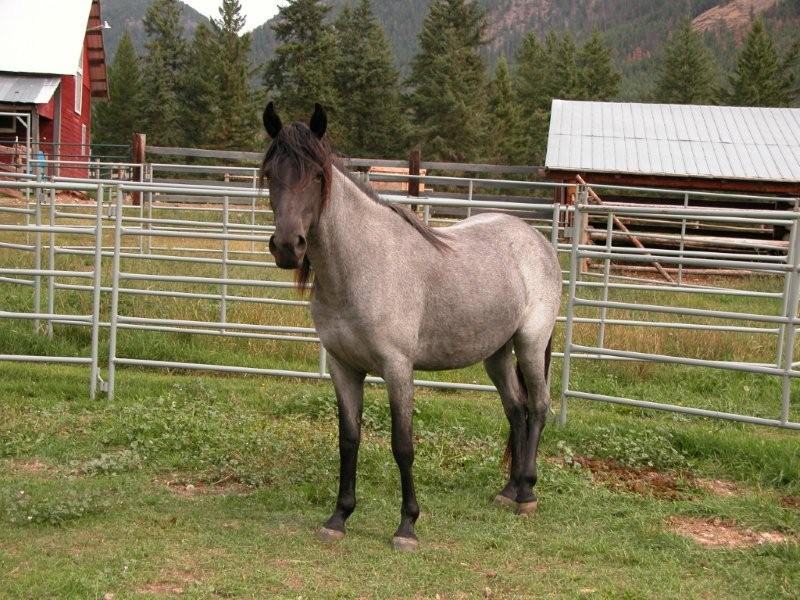

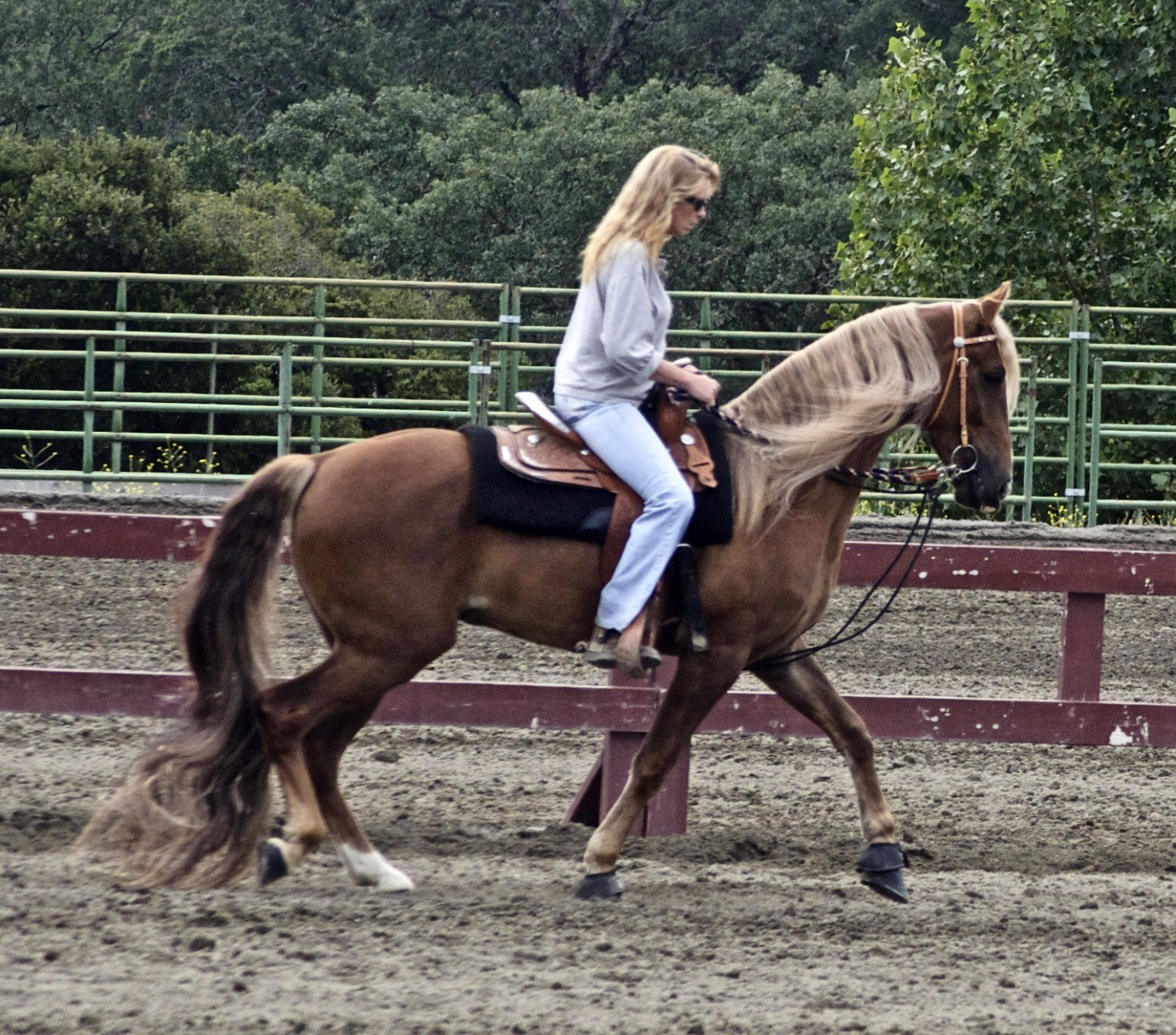
- Other names: Spotted Mountain Horse
- Country of origin: United States (Kentucky)

Breed standards
- Kentucky Mountain Saddle Horse Association

The Kentucky Mountain Saddle Horse is a horse breed from the U.S. state of Kentucky. Developed as an all-around farm and riding horse in eastern Kentucky, it is related to the Tennessee Walking Horse and other gaited breeds. In 1989 the Kentucky Mountain Saddle Horse Association (KMSHA) was formed, and in 2002, the subsidiary Spotted Mountain Horse Association (SMHA) was developed to register Kentucky Mountain Saddle Horses with excessive white markings and pinto patterns. Conformation standards are the same for the two groups of horses, with the main difference being the color requirements. The KMSHA studbook is now closed to horses from unregistered parents, although it cross-registers with several other registries, while the SMHA studbook remains open.

== Characteristics ==
Kentucky Mountain Saddle Horses must stand above 11 hands (44 inches, 112 cm) high to be registered. Horses above this height are divided into two categories: Class A horses stand taller than 14.2 hands (58 inches, 147 cm), while Class B horses stand 11 to 14.1 hands (44 to 57 inches, 112 to 145 cm) high. Horses registered with the Kentucky Mountain Saddle Horse Association (KMSHA) may be found in all solid colors, with white markings allowed on the face, legs and small patches of the belly. Horses with excessive white, including "bald face" or full white faces, white above the knees or hocks, or showing pinto markings (including tobiano, overo and sabino) are instead registered with the Spotted Mountain Horse Association (SMHA), a subsidiary of the KMSHA. Solid colored foals of two SMHA-registered parents are usually registered with the SMHA, but solid-colored geldings of SMHA-registered parents may be registered with the KMSHA, though they cannot be dual registered.

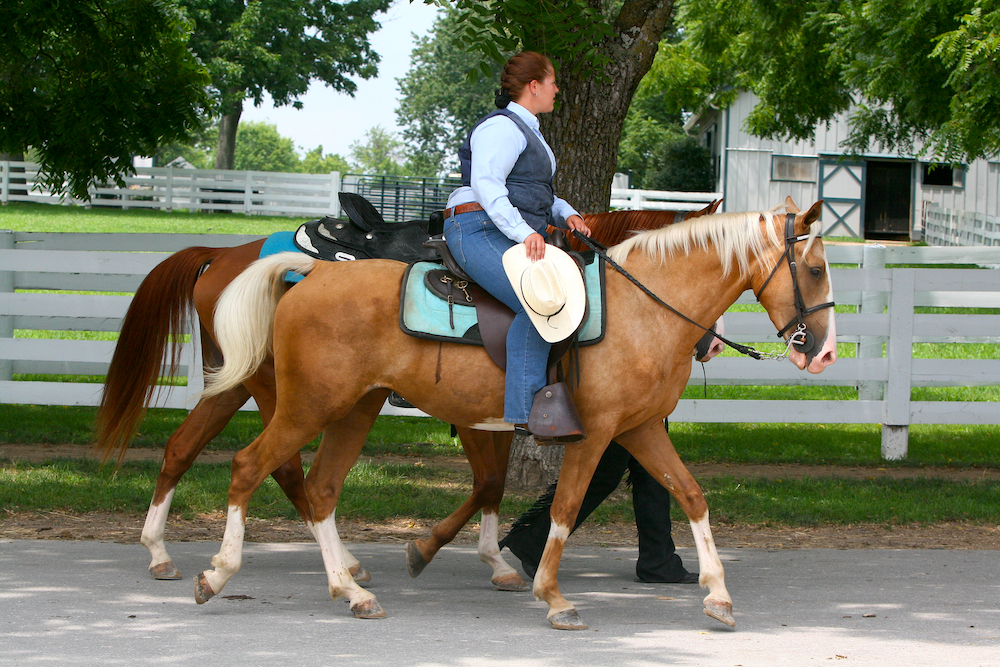
A palomino Saddle Horse

Kentucky Mountain Saddle Horses are mid-sized horses, with a well-muscled and compact build. The breed has a flat facial profile, a mid-length, well-arched neck, a deep chest and well-sloped shoulders. They are known to be self-sufficient and easy keepers. To be registered, Kentucky Mountain Saddle Horses must demonstrate a "gentle temperament and willing disposition" to registry examiners.

The breed exhibits a natural ambling gait, called the single-foot, which replaces the trot seen in a majority of horse breeds. Both gaits are an intermediate speed between a walk and a canter or gallop; ambling gaits are four-beat gaits, whereas the trot is a two-beat gait. The extra footfalls provide additional smoothness to a rider because the horse always has at least one foot on the ground. This minimizes movement of the horse's topline and removes the bounce of a two-beat gait, caused by a moment of suspension followed by the jolt of two feet hitting the ground as the horse shifts from one pair of legs to the other. The value of an intermediate speed is that the horse conserves energy. More than thirty horse breeds are "gaited," able to perform a four-beat ambling gait, and some can also trot.

=== Registration ===
Mares and stallions from non-KMSHA parents may not be registered in the main studbook, unless the parents are registered with the Rocky Mountain Horse Association, Mountain Pleasure Horse Association or Kentucky Naturally Gaited Horse Association. Geldings from unregistered parents may be registered if they otherwise meet breed standards. Mares from unregistered parents may be registered as "Appendix"; their colts must be gelded, but resultant fillies may be registered as full Kentucky Mountain Saddle Horses. The Spotted Mountain Horse studbook is still open to all unregistered horses who otherwise meet breed standards.

== Breed history ==
The Kentucky Mountain Saddle Horse developed in Eastern Kentucky, and probably have their ancestry in smooth-gaited horses from the southeastern US and the now-extinct Narragansett Pacer. They are related to the Tennessee Walking Horse and other gaited breeds, but their exact early history is unknown. Kentucky Mountain Saddle Horses have a similar history to the Rocky Mountain Horse, and together are sometimes called "Mountain Pleasure Horses". The Kentucky Mountain Saddle Horse was developed by farmers looking for a small horse that could perform dual duty as a powerful work horse and comfortable riding horse. They were used for long travel over rough terrain, and were developed to have gentle temperaments so that they could be handled by young members of the farm families. Today, they continue to be used as riding horses, and are regarded as excellent trail mounts in rugged terrain.

The KMSHA was founded in 1989. In 2002, a subsidiary organization, the SMHA, was formed to register horses who had more white markings than were allowed by the KMSHA. As of 2011, the KMSHA has over 3,200 members and has registered over 24,000 horses. The majority of the horses are in Kentucky, but the breed is also seen throughout the US, as well as in Canada and a small population in Europe. The KMSHA and SMHA host a joint championship show each year at the Kentucky Horse Park.
