= Mountain Pleasure Horse =

Breed of horse

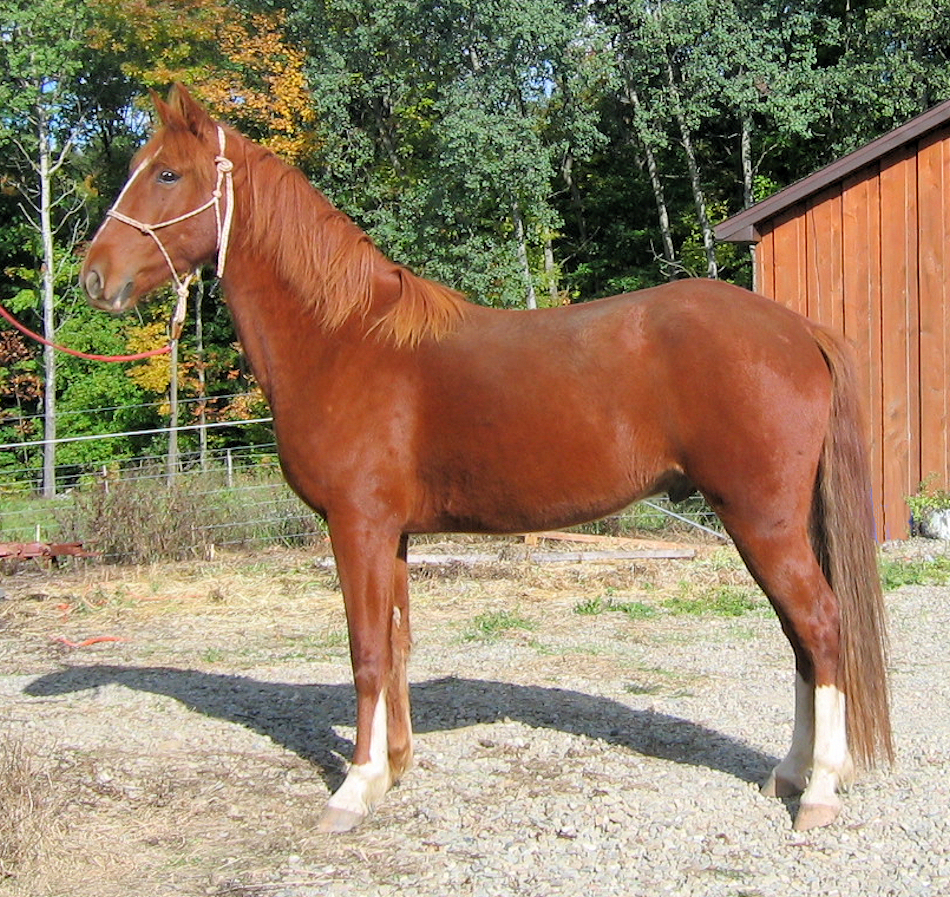
- Mountain Pleasure Horse.
- Country of origin: United States

Traits
- Distinguishing features: Gaited, sturdy build, calm temperament

Breed standards
- Mountain Pleasure Horse Association

The Mountain Pleasure Horse is a breed of gaited horse that was developed in the Appalachian Mountains of Eastern Kentucky. This breed reflects the primitive Appalachian gaited horse type and genetic testing shows them to share ancestry with earlier breeds developed in the region, including the American Saddlebred, the Tennessee Walking Horse and the Rocky Mountain Horse. Some Mountain Pleasure Horse bloodlines are traceable for over 180 years.

The Mountain Pleasure Horse Association was formed in 1989 with goals to preserve the bloodlines and encourage the breeding of Mountain Pleasure Horses. MPHA was the first mountain horse breed association to require blood-typing for the foundation stock and all subsequent horses presented for registration for absolute identification of parentage. In recent years, DNA testing has replaced blood-typing as proof of parentage.

== Characteristics ==
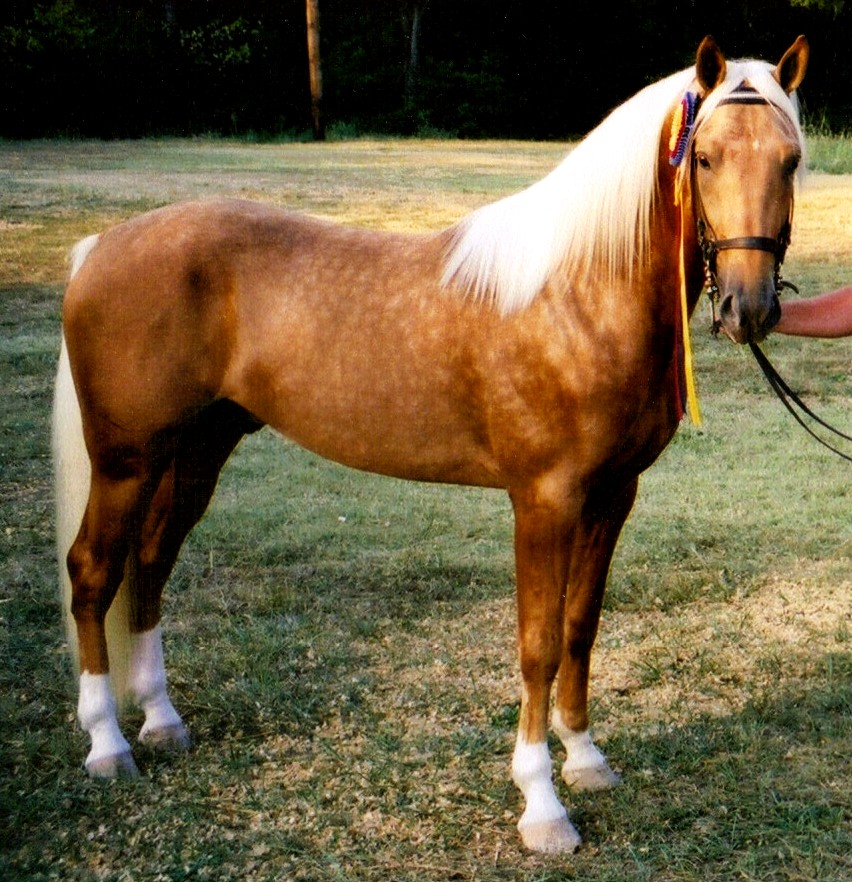
A Mountain Pleasure Horse stallion.

Mountain Pleasure Horses are medium-sized, standing on average 14.2 to 15.2 hands (58 to 62 inches, 147 to 157 cm). Desired characteristics include balanced proportions with a physical structure conducive to the horse’s soundness and longevity. They should have a laid-back shoulder, ideally having an angle of 45 degrees, allowing the horse to move out in a reaching stride. Strong, correctly angled hind legs allow impulsion in all gaits and also to navigate rugged or steep terrain. An arched neck, attractive head and kind eye are preferred. The breed is intended to be a gentle family horse with a calm temperament, sensibility and intelligence.

The breed's intermediate speed gait is an evenly spaced, four beat lateral gait with moderate forward speed and extension without exaggerated knee and hock action. The racking gait of a Mountain Pleasure Horse is very smooth and is the product of generations of careful breeding. Mountain Pleasure Horse foals are known to demonstrate their innate ability to perform this gait within hours of birth.

== History ==
Mountain Pleasure Horses are descendants of the smooth-gaited horses that came to this country with the first settlers. Small, hardy Hobbies, gaited ponies from the British Isles, were used to develop the American Narragansett Pacer. Bred in the New England Colonies during the 17th century, The Narragansett was a fast pacing horse for racing contests. They also performed a smooth ambling gait, sometimes referred to as a “single-footed trot", which made them favorite mounts for traveling between the sparsely settled colonies, especially in rugged terrain. The Narragansett Pacer had disappeared from the New England colonies by the early 1800s but the purebred strain of the breed slowly was lost to crossbreeding. Small populations continued to thrive in the Appalachian regions where they were treasured for their smooth gaits, hardiness and sweet dispositions. The Narragansett breed did not die out completely until the last-known mare died in 1880.

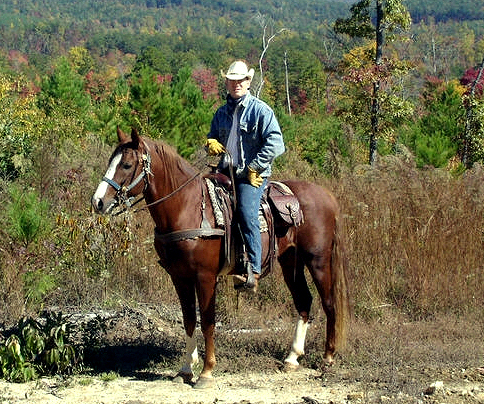
A Mountain Pleasure Horse under saddle.

In Eastern Kentucky, the descendants of these horses were simply referred to as “saddle horses” or “mountain horses". They were expected to be able to work the fields or carry a rider comfortably, whichever was needed on a given day. While the rugged topography isolated Appalachia, it did not keep the mail from being delivered or the salesmen from making their rounds, relying on their “old-time mountain horses” for transportation. While formal history is limited, individuals whose families have bred these horses for several generations can often provide names and dates as far back as the early 19th century. With careful attention to the qualities that make an excellent saddle horse, mares were bred to the best stallion within the same branch. These stallions were often referred to by the family name: “Coffey’s Major”, “Cable’s Rex”, “Little’s Silver”, “Jasper Jones Bucky”. While few people kept formal breeding records, rarely did they forget where their horses came from.

From the early 1900s to the 1940s, breeders involved in the development of the Tennessee Walking Horse made regular trips into eastern Kentucky to find well-gaited mares to put to their foundation Tennessee Walking Horse stallions. These quality mares contributed greatly to the Walking Horse breed. Palomino horses were also highly sought after and several were sold to a horse broker who purchased horses for Roy Rogers.

Geneticist Ernest “Gus” Cothran, while working for the University of Kentucky developed a chart showing the progression of horse breeds as determined through blood-typing. Blood markers have shown the Mountain Pleasure Horse to be related to the Rocky Mountain Horse, American Saddlebred and Tennessee Walking Horse. Modern methods of genetic testing confirm those findings.

== Mountain Pleasure Horse Association ==
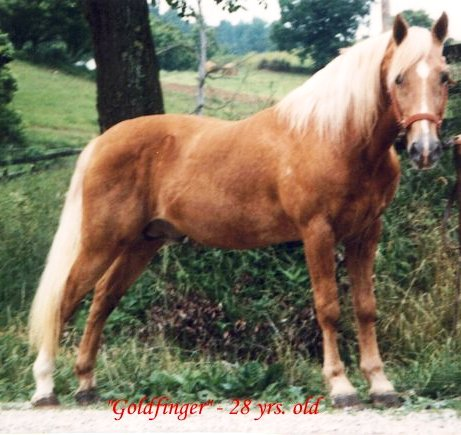
A foundation Mountain Pleasure Horse stallion.

In 1989 a group of Kentucky breeders decided the time had come to form a breed association. Mountain Pleasure Horse was chosen as the name for the breed. On Saturday “Certification Days”, people would bring their old-time mountain horses to be presented before a panel of examiners. Foundation stock was selected and known pedigrees were recorded. Blood was drawn and sent to the University of Kentucky to begin the process of proof of parentage for all registered horses. Thus, the Mountain Pleasure Horse became a breed. MPHA stallion registry books were closed in 1991 with 100 registered stallions. MPHA mare registry books were closed the following year with 400 mares on the books.

On September 29, 1994, Brereton C. Jones, Governor of the Commonwealth of Kentucky issued a proclamation to recognize the importance of the Mountain Pleasure Horse. In this proclamation, Jones acknowledged that breeders in Eastern Kentucky had developed a unique breed of horse known for its gentle disposition, smooth gait, work ethic and sure-footedness. He noted that these horses had been bred for 160 traceable years and that research by the University of Kentucky found them to be the parent stock of all other American gaited horse breeds. A photocopy of this document can be viewed on the website of the Mountain Pleasure Horse Association.

== Genetic Significance ==
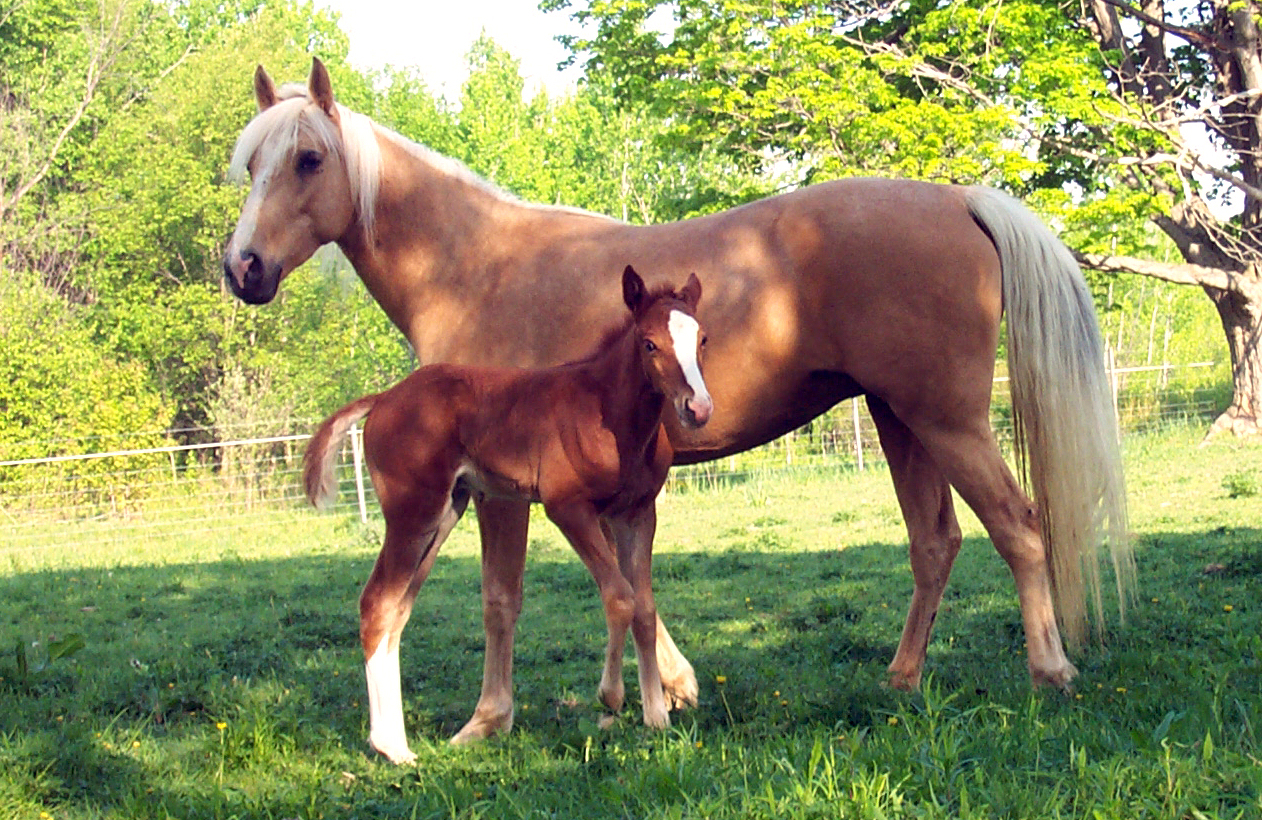
Mare and foal.

Due to the genetic importance and small numbers of Mountain Pleasure Horses, Equus Survival Trust has placed the Mountain Pleasure Horse on their watch list, with their status listed as “critical”.

From 1994 to 2009, the MPHA books remained closed to outside horses. In March, 2009, the MPHA board of directors opened the books to allow appendix horses and “outstanding mountain stallions” to be registered under certain circumstances. The stated purpose of this was to increase the number of breeding horses within the registry.

In 2014, as MPHA board members reviewed the registry, it was determined that the appendix program had brought about negative consequences.

Also in 2014, The MPHA board separated the registry into two divisions: Purebreds and Appendix. Appendix horses would continue to qualify for participation in all MPHA events. The progeny of Appendix horses would continue to be listed in the Appendix registry but only horses descended from the original foundation stock would be included in the Purebred section of the registry.

With the specific identification of the appendix and purebred horses in the registry, MPHA once again qualified for Kentucky Horse Breeders Incentive Fund (KBIF) funding. MPHA has announced an Award Distribution Plan for Mountain Pleasure Horse Breeders for the years 2015-2017. Through this program, nominated purebred Mountain Pleasure Horses may earn points by competing in eligible ACTHA (American Competitive Trail Horse Association) or MPHA (Mountain Pleasure Horse Association) affiliated competitive trail riding or obstacle challenge classes in Kentucky and the United States.
