= Military career of Stonewall Jackson =

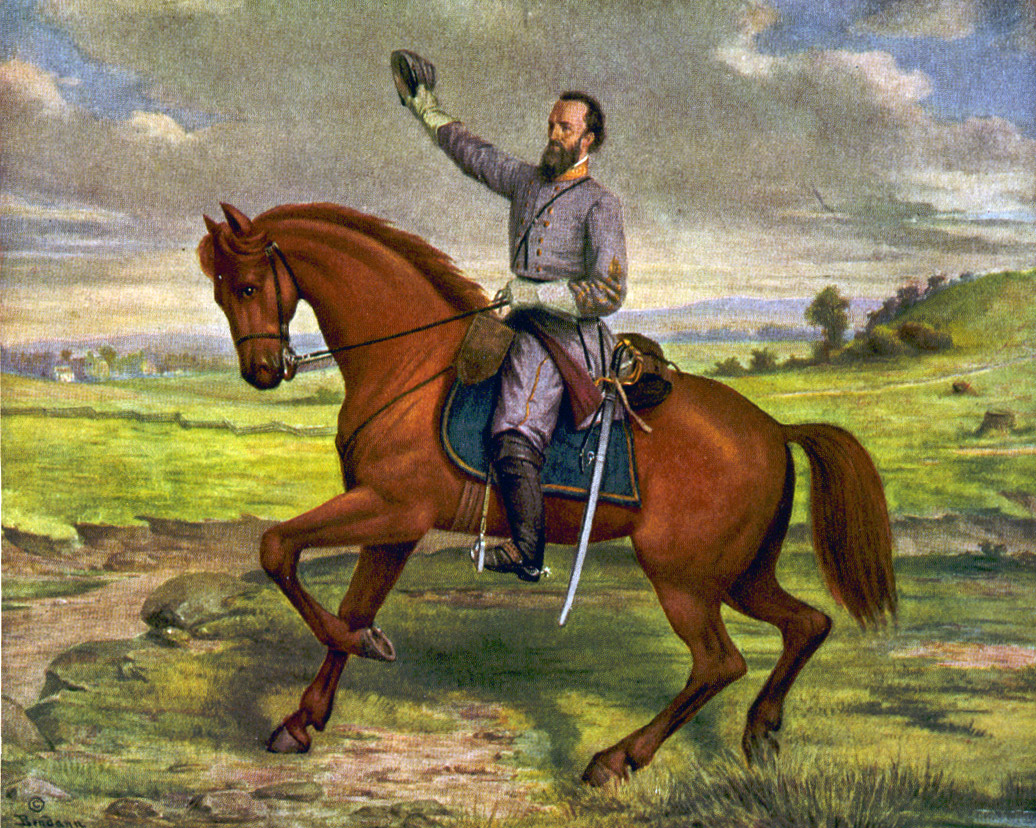
Jackson and Little Sorrel, painting by David Bendann.

The military career of Stonewall Jackson, a Confederate officer during the American Civil War, consists of a combination of various brevet, temporary, and permanent appointments in no less than five different military organizations.

Jackson was also a civilian military instructor (while still granted military status as an officer), and when the Civil War began, he became an officer in the state forces of Virginia. He was later appointed in the Provisional Army of the Confederate States (PACS) while also holding a permanent rank as a major in the Confederate States Army.

== West Point service ==
Stonewall Jackson was appointed to the United States Military Academy in the summer of 1842, at the age of eighteen years, after Cadet Gibson Butcher resigned after one day of service. After petitioning Congressman Samuel Hays to appoint Jackson as an emergency replacement for Butcher, Jackson reported for duty on June 18, 1842.

Considered simply as a "plebe" during his first semester at West Point, Jackson finished his first term in January 1843 and was appointed a cadet fourth class on February 20, 1843. Jackson's 1842–1843 4th-class year ended on a high note with the visit of Winfield Scott to West Point in June 1843.

Jackson assumed duties as a third class cadet in July 1843 and finished his sophomore year without incident in the spring of 1844. Now twenty years old, he was then appointed a second class cadet and granted his first ever summer vacation from West Point, returning on August 28, 1844. For the 1844–1845 school year, Jackson was appointed a cadet sergeant, the only leadership position he would hold in the corps. When his junior year ended in the spring of 1845, Jackson was advanced to cadet first class but was not granted a senior leadership position. He was thus referred to as a "cadet high private".

Jackson graduated from West Point at the age of 22 in June 1846. The academy at the time had no graduation ceremonies or formal presentation of diplomas, with Jackson departing on July 1, 1846, as a brevet second lieutenant.

Key dates

- June 18, 1842: appointed a plebe cadet, United States Military Academy
- February 20, 1843: appointed a fourth class cadet
- July 1, 1843: appointed a third class cadet
- June 25, 1844: appointed a second class cadet
- August 28, 1844: appointed a cadet sergeant
- July 1, 1845: appointed a first class cadet w/o position ("high private")
- June 30, 1846: graduated from West Point and commissioned a brevet second lieutenant

== Mexican War service ==
Jackson graduated West Point the same year that the Mexican–American War began. The commander of the United States Army, Winfield Scott, made it clear in his early campaign planning that he wanted leadership of his invasion army to comprise regular army officers with a minimal use of militia, who Scott felt were undertrained.

Jackson was issued official military orders on July 22, 1846, assigning him to Company K of the 1st U.S. Artillery presently headquartered at Fort Columbus in New York. Two weeks later, Jackson arrived at Fort Columbus to find his company already deployed to Mexico. Jackson's new commanding officer, Francis Taylor, who had remained behind, then detailed the young second lieutenant to recruiting duty to collect new recruits and horses for a future deployment to Texas.

Jackson was deployed on August 19, and it took until October 5 for himself and the new members of Company K to reach Camargo in Mexico. By November 24, the entire Company K had assembled at Monterrey, and on November 29 the first official combat campaign began in which Jackson was a participant. This was the attack against Saltillo although by the time the American forces arrived, the town was found to be deserted.

1847 brought hopes of an amphibious campaign, and by March 5, Company K had been relocated off the shores of Veracruz. Here Jackson's true war record begins as he participated in the Siege of Veracruz followed by combat at the Battle of Cerro Gordo. In April 1847, Jackson was informed that his brevet (temporary) rank of second lieutenant was now being made permanent in the United States Army.

Jackson was transferred to Company G of the 1st Artillery, but Captain Taylor delayed the actual move until May 1847. Jackson then assumed duties under Captain John H. Winder with the American forces next ordered to move against Perote, Veracruz. Jackson's new company, however, was ordered to garrison duty in the town of Xalapa. There Jackson would remain until June 18, 1847, when Company G was ordered forward into action although, in reality, this entailed simply further garrison duty in the city of Puebla.

On July 13, Jackson was transferred to Company I of the 1st Artillery, with the unit ordered into action on August 7. The Battle of Contreras followed, accompanied by an assault at Molino del Rey. Jackson's combat participation then continued in the Battle of Chapultepec with a culmination in September 1847, when Jackson participated in the Battle for Mexico City.

On August 20, 1847, Jackson had been promoted to first lieutenant with recommendations made for brevet promotions to both captain and major. He had also been made the acting company commander of Company I but was replaced by William French on December 4, 1847. On January 19, 1848, Jackson transferred back to his original company (Company K) and served as a company officer until the Treaty of Guadalupe Hidalgo in March 1848. On July 5, Company K was ordered to depart Mexico and by July 20 the unit was in New Orleans.

First Lieutenant Jackson's activities immediately following the Mexican War consisted mainly of administrative tasks accompanied by some free time in which Jackson engaged in some furloughs both to Virginia and Niagara Falls. Between the summer of 1848 and the start of 1849, Jackson was detailed to various Forts including Fort Columbus, Fort Hamilton, as well as a detail to serve on a court martial at Carlisle Barracks in Pennsylvania. With his primary posting at Fort Hamilton, Jackson performed duties as acting company commander, post adjutant, as well as the company quartermaster.

In February 1849, Jackson had heard nothing about his brevet promotions from the Mexican War and was still merely a first lieutenant. News came in the last days of February that Jackson had been promoted to brevet captain with a date of rank from August 20, 1847. Just two days later, Jackson learned of his promotion to brevet major with date of rank from September 13, 1847.

As a brevet major, Jackson next looked forward to what future assignments that the United States Army had to offer. This path led Jackson to the state of Florida, where events would transpire to eventually persuade Jackson to resign from the U.S. Army.

Mexican War promotions

- July 1, 1846: brevet second lieutenant of artillery, United States Army
- March 3, 1847: second lieutenant (permanent), United States Army
- August 20, 1847: first lieutenant (permanent), United States Army
- August 20, 1847: brevet captain, United States Army (appointed February 1849)
- September 13, 1847: brevet major, United States Army (appointed March 1849)

Mexican War assignments

- July 1846: Company K, 1st Artillery Regiment
- May 1847: Company G, 1st Artillery Regiment
- July 1847: Company I, 1st Artillery Regiment
- January 1848: Company K, 1st Artillery Regiment

== Florida and resignation ==
Following the Mexican War, Jackson was assigned to a garrison post in Florida, where he quickly became enemies with his commanding officer, Major William H. French, filing numerous complaints with the regional commander, Major General David E. Twiggs. Jackson's army career thereafter took a sharp downward turn, and he resigned from the military in 1851 in order to pursue a career as a military instructor at the Virginia Military Institute. In many ways, Jackson in fact behaved as if he had never left the army while at VMI, as he routinely wore a uniform and was addressed by faculty and students as "Major Jackson".

== Service at VMI ==
- September 24, 1851: Accepts appointment at VMI, wears major's insignia on U.S. Army uniform
- February 29, 1852: Resigns from the United States Army as a brevet major and permanent 1st lieutenant

== The Civil War ==
See main article for details regarding Stonewall Jackson's Civil War career

On April 17, 1861, Virginia seceded from the United States of America, and Jackson was ordered to mobilize the VMI Corps of cadets to Richmond. Upon arriving at Richmond, Jackson presented himself to the state governor and requested a formal military assignment. To Jackson's disappointment, he was appointed to his former rank in the U.S. Army (Major) and assigned to what he saw as unimportant duties with military engineers.

After a second conversation with the governor, in which Jackson made his displeasure of his previous appointment known, Jackson was approved by the Virginia General Assembly as a colonel in the new "Provisional Army of Virginia" (also known as the "Citizens Army of Virginia") to which Robert E. Lee was the supreme commander.

When Virginia formally joined the Confederacy in May 1861, Jackson's Virginia appointments were converted to the Provisional Army of Confederacy and he became a colonel in the Confederate Army. For administrative reasons, Jackson's appointment as a Confederate colonel was backdated to March 16, 1861 (the date that the Virginia Assembly first began debating formal succession). Thus, Jackson has the distinction of being a Confederate colonel (at least on paper) a full month before his state actually joined the Confederacy.

The Confederate Army also had a permanent regular army, this known as the Army of the Confederate States of America. In October 1862, after Jackson was already a major general in the Confederate Provisional Army, he was appointed to the permanent rank of major of artillery in the Army of the Confederate States.

While in Harpers Ferry as a Virginia States Forces colonel, Jackson was also placed in command of the entire Virginia Militia, making him by default a militia general. Jackson never referred to himself in this sense and quickly petitioned the Governor of Virginia to fold militia forces into the regular state army.

The earliest use of Jackson wearing a gray Confederate Army uniform was in Winchester, Virginia, in the early spring of 1862. Prior to this time, although a serving officer in the Confederacy, Jackson wore his blue VMI officer uniform with various insignia.

Dates of Rank

- April 25, 1861: Major of Topographic Engineers, Virginia Militia
- April 27, 1861: Colonel, Provisional Army of Virginia
- May 23, 1861: Colonel of Infantry, Provisional Army of the Confederacy
- June 17, 1861: Brigadier General, Provisional Army of the Confederacy
- October 7, 1861: Major General, Provisional Army of the Confederacy
- October 31, 1861: Major of Artillery (Permanent), Confederate States Army
- October 10, 1862: Lieutenant General, Provisional Army of the Confederacy
