= Old Tobe =

- Breed: Rocky Mountain Horse
- Discipline: Trail riding
- Sex: Stallion

Old Tobe was the foundation sire of the Rocky Mountain Horse breed. He was owned by Sam Tuttle, and used as a trail horse in Kentucky's Natural Bridge State Park. Old Tobe was gaited, and passed the trait to his offspring.

== Life ==
Old Tobe was sired by the original Rocky Mountain Horse, an unidentified gaited stallion with a liver chestnut coat and flaxen mane and tail who was brought to Kentucky from the Colorado Rocky Mountains around 1900. He was owned by Sam Tuttle of Spout Springs, Kentucky, who operated the trail riding concession at the nearby Natural Bridge State Park in Powell County, Kentucky. Tuttle was one of the few horse breeders in the area who kept his horses through the Great Depression and second World War; Old Tobe was one of as many as fifty horses that Tuttle owned and used for his trail riding business. Old Tobe was used as a trail horse, often for inexperienced riders, and was gentle enough to be tied next to mares. He also performed an ambling gait. Old Tobe was bred both to mares owned by Tuttle, and outside mares owned by other breeders. His offspring inherited his gait and disposition, and were popular in eastern Kentucky. He sired foals until he was 34, and lived to be 37 years old. He and five of his sons were named as foundation sires when the Rocky Mountain Horse Association was formed in 1986.
