= Old Baldy (horse) =

Horse in the American Civil War

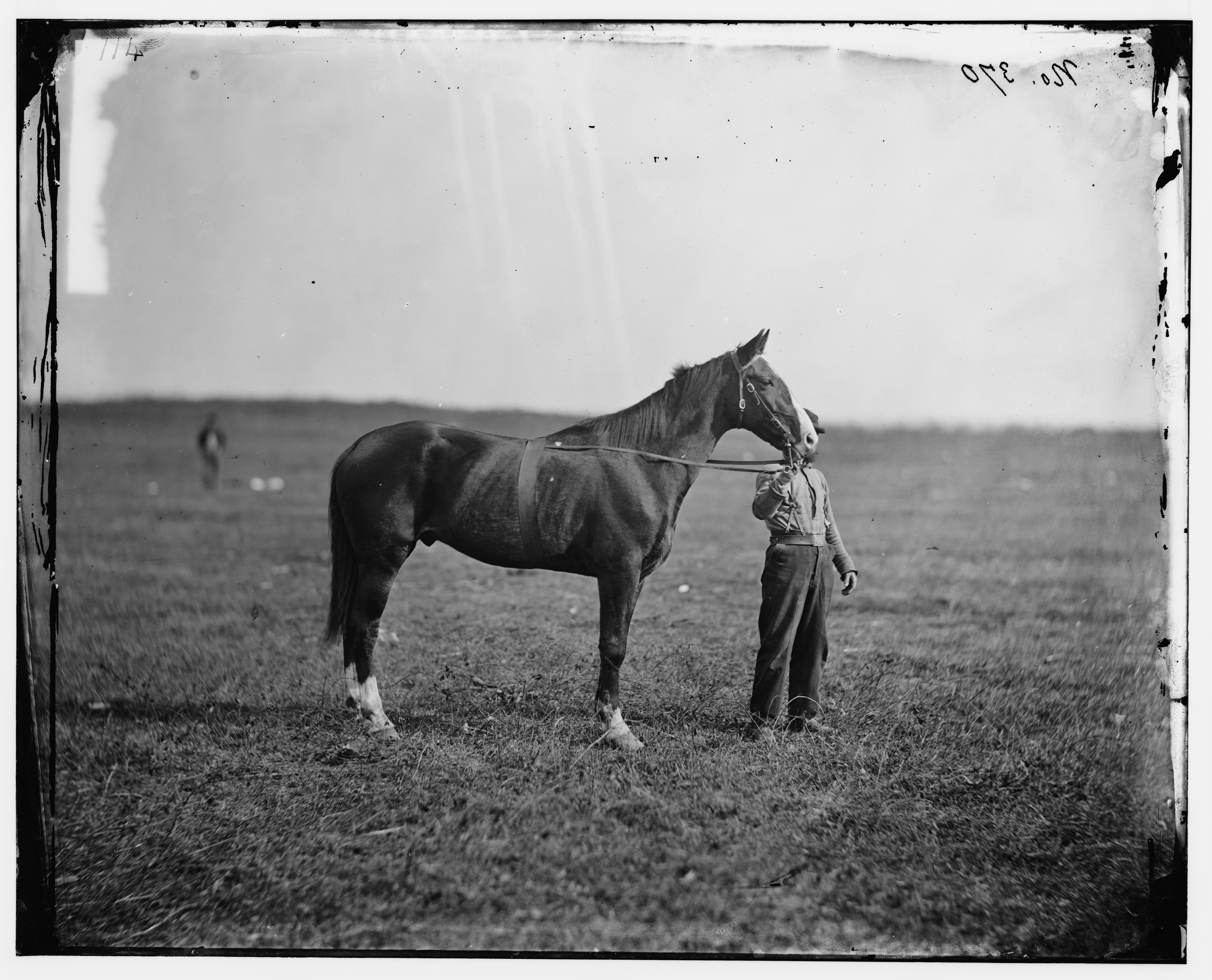
Old Baldy in 1863

Old Baldy (ca. 1852 – December 16, 1882) was the horse ridden by Union Major General George G. Meade at the Battle of Gettysburg and in many other important battles of the American Civil War.

== Early life and Civil War service ==
Baldy was born and raised on the western frontier and at the start of the Civil War was owned by Maj. Gen. David Hunter. His name during this period is unknown. It is said that he was wounded anywhere from five to 14 times during the war, starting at the First Battle of Bull Run, where he was struck in the nose by a piece of an artillery shell. Soon after, in September 1861, he was purchased from the government by Meade in Washington, D.C., for $150 and named Baldy because of his white face.

Despite Baldy's unusual, uncomfortable pace, Meade became quite devoted to him and rode him in all of his battles through 1862 and the spring of 1863. The horse was wounded in the right hind leg at the Second Battle of Bull Run, and at Antietam, he was wounded through the neck and left for dead on the field. He survived and was treated. At Gettysburg, on July 2, 1863, Baldy was hit by a bullet that entered his stomach after passing through Meade's right trouser leg. He staggered and refused to move forward, defying all of Meade's directions. Meade commented, "Baldy is done for this time. This is the first time he has refused to go forward under fire." Baldy was sent to the rear for recuperation. In 1864, having returned to duty for the Overland Campaign and the Siege of Petersburg, he was struck in the ribs by a shell at the Weldon Railroad, and Meade decided that Old Baldy should be retired.

== Retirement and death ==
Baldy was sent north to Philadelphia and then to the farm of Meade's staff quartermaster, Captain Sam Ringwalt, in Downingtown, Pennsylvania. He was later relocated to the Meadow Bank Farm, owned by a friend of the Meade family, where he remained for several years. He was moderately active in retirement and Meade rode the horse in several memorial parades. His last parade was as the "riderless horse" in the funeral procession of his master, in November 1872. Baldy lived another 10 years. He was euthanized on December 16, 1882, at the age of 30, when he became too feeble to stand. On Christmas Day of that year, two Union Army veterans (Albert C. Johnston and H.W.B. Harvey) disinterred Baldy's remains and decapitated him, sending the head to a taxidermist.

== Baldy's remains ==
Baldy's head was mounted on a plaque in a glass case and displayed in the Grand Army of the Republic Civil War Museum and Library in Philadelphia. In 1979, his head was loaned to the Old Baldy Civil War Round Table, which paid for its restoration and placed it on exhibit in the Meade Room of the Civil War Museum of Philadelphia. The latter museum closed in August 2008, pending a relocation, and most of its artifacts were distributed to other museums, including the Gettysburg Museum and Visitor Center. Attorneys for the two museums reached an agreement under the auspices of the Philadelphia Orphans' Court in December 2009 to return Old Baldy to the GAR museum on Griscom Street. Ceremonies marking the resumption of public display of Old Baldy at the museum were conducted on September 26, 2010.

== See also ==
- List of horses of the American Civil War
