= Little Sorrel (horse) =

Horse in the American Civil War

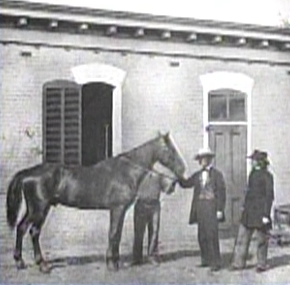
- The only wartime photograph of Little Sorrel, in 1863
- Species: Equus ferus caballus
- Breed: Morgan or Narragansett Pacer
- Sex: Male
- Born: 1850; Somers, Connecticut
- Died: March 16, 1886 (aged 35–36)
- Resting place: Lexington, Virginia
- Occupation: War horse
- Owner: General Stonewall Jackson
- Height: 14 hands (56 in 142 cm) to 15 hands (60 in 152 cm)
- Appearance: Chestnut or sorrel in color, also described as reddish-brown

Little Sorrel (1850–March 16, 1886) was Confederate General Thomas J. "Stonewall" Jackson's horse during the American Civil War. Along with Robert E. Lee's horse Traveller, he was one of the most famous horses of the war. He was a chestnut-colored horse of Morgan or Narragansett Pacer stock, 14-15 hands high (56-60 inches), and notable for his endurance and calm disposition. Jackson acquired him in May 1861 and rode him in some of the most consequential battles in U.S. history. Jackson was riding Little Sorrel when he was accidentally shot by his own troops at the Battle of Chancellorsville and died in May 1863.

Little Sorrel was eventually returned to Jackson's widow, and lived a long life, dying at the age of 36 in 1886. The skeletal remains of Little Sorrel are interred in Lexington, Virginia.

== Birth and acquisition by Jackson ==
The foal that was later to be named Little Sorrel was likely born on a farm owned by Noah C. Collins on Pink Street (now Springfield Road), in Somers, Connecticut in 1850. He was purchased by the U.S. government for use in the Civil War. In May 1861, then-Colonel Thomas J. Jackson, later known as "Stonewall", was stationed at Harpers Ferry (West) Virginia, when the train that was carrying Little Sorrel, other horses, cattle, and Union supplies passed through the town. The train was stopped by Jackson's men and the livestock and supplies were appropriated. Jackson did not have a regular mount, so his quartermaster John A. Harman selected two horses for him. Both were sorrel-color (chestnut, or reddish-brown) geldings, one was large, and the other small. Jackson paid Harman $150 for the smaller horse, which he initially named Fancy, and planned to give it to his wife Anna. Within a day, however, Jackson found that the larger horse had an uneven gait and was difficult to control, and he preferred the smaller horse, with its smoother gait and even temper. He kept the smaller horse for himself, and it came to be known as Little Sorrel (or occasionally "Old Sorrel").

The horse was regularly described as "unimpressive" or "unassuming" in appearance. Little Sorrel's breed is commonly described as a Morgan, however historian Sharon B. Smith has argued that his characteristics were much more similar to a Narragansett Pacer. In contrast to some of the other war horses of the time, Little Sorrel was considered a "pacer", a horse whose intermediate gait between a walk and a run is faster than a trot. He is described as either 14 or 15 hands high (56-60 inches or 142–152 cm) (the height of the horse from the ground to the withers) and "well-formed".

Although he had raced horses as a teenager on a racetrack his uncle Cummins Jackson owned in Jackson's Mill where he grew up, Jackson was reputed to have disliked horseback riding, and preferred small, smooth-gaited animals, despite his height of 6 ft 0 in (1.83 m). Little Sorrel appeared inappropriately small for the man, to many observers. A 1921 statue of Jackson on Little Sorrel in Charlottesville, Virginia by sculptor Charles Keck was initially criticized as being disproportional, and at the town's request the sculptor made adjustments. Despite that, the horse still appeared too small for the rider, but reflected their actual appearance.

== War service ==
Jackson was promoted to brigadier general in June 1861, and led a brigade. His first action in the war was at the Battle of Hoke's Run in Berkeley County, (West) Virginia, on July 2, 1861. The battle was an early skirmish as part of the broader Manassas campaign, and was likely the first time the horse experienced combat.

On July 21, 19 days later, Jackson's brigade fought in the momentous First Battle of Bull Run. It was the first major conflict of the war, but Jackson did not ride Little Sorrel, the one and only engagement he fought without the horse. The record is not clear why he used a borrowed horse; he may have not yet realized just how good Little Sorrel was in battle or for some other logistical reason.

The battle of Bull Run, far from being a quick Union victory that would put a swift end to the war, as some in the North had thought, was a sobering and decisive Confederate triumph. It was also where Jackson acquired his famous nickname, when brigade commander Barnard E. Bee is said to have exhorted his own troops to re-form after being pushed back, shouting, "There is Jackson standing like a stone wall. Let us determine to die here, and we will conquer. Rally behind the Virginians." Jackson's brigade was subsequently known as the Stonewall Brigade, and Jackson was promoted again, to major general.

After the battle Jackson was written about regularly in the Southern press, including mentions of his horse ("a nondescript little sorrel"), and in time the horse became nearly as recognizable as he was.

In August or September, a black man named Jim Lewis came to be employed by Jackson as a groom. Lewis was probably a slave, although not Jackson's slave, and one of his primary duties was to take care of Jackson's horses. Lewis came to be devoted to the general, but even more so to Little Sorrel. In language typical of the era, Alexander Boteler, a Virginia Congressman who acted as a liaison for Jackson, described Lewis and Little Sorrel as matches in terms of temperament and disposition: “For they were equally obedient, patient, easy-going and reliable; not given to devious courses nor designing tricks; more serviceable than showy... Both man and horse seemed to understand their master thoroughly and rarely failed to come up fully to all his requirements." Lewis was a well-loved figure around Jackson's headquarters.

On January 1, 1862, Jackson led his troops on a scheme to retake western Virginia, by leading a march to occupy Romney, (West) Virginia. The following day, however, a bitter winter storm set in, making the roads a sheet of ice. According to Jackson's wife Anna later, the event is what led Jackson to become extremely fond of Little Sorrel. While other horses were slipping in the difficult conditions, Little Sorrel was sure-footed, never tired, and could survive on little fodder.

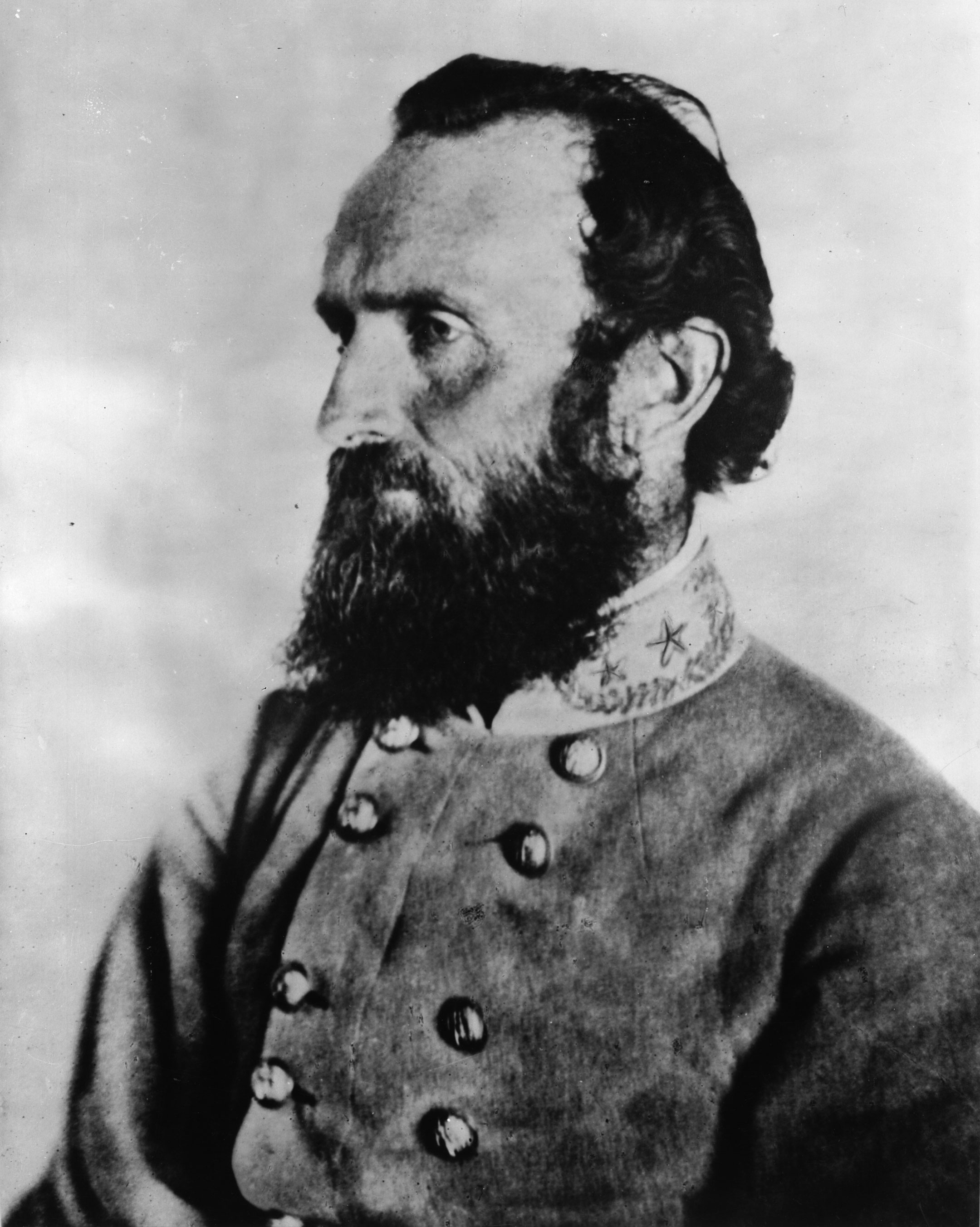
Photograph of Jackson taken on April 26, 1863, six days before he was mortally wounded

Although Jackson’s soldiers and aides referred to the horse by the name Little Sorrel, the general rarely did. He may have used the phrase to differentiate the animal from the larger sorrel horse that he had acquired in 1861. Instead Jackson continued to use the name Fancy, which was also the name of a horse he had before the war when he was briefly posted in New York.

In the spring and early summer of 1862, Jackson led his army, now consisting of 17,000 men, in a string of victorious engagements against Union troops in the Shenandoah Valley. These included battles at McDowell, Front Royal, Winchester, Cross Keys, and Port Republic. The victories lifted Southern morale and increased Jackson's fame as a strategist, even in Northern newspapers.

Little Sorrel came to be known for his endurance and steadiness under fire. One of Jackson's aides, Lieutenant Henry Kyd Douglas, described Little Sorrel as "a remarkable little horse. Such endurance I have never seen in horse flesh. We had no horse at Hd. Qrs. That could match him. I never saw him show a sign of fatigue." Another staff member, Lieutenant John Lyle said of the horse, "He did up the steeds of the staff," referring to his endurance. He developed the reputation of remaining calm in battle. Henry Kyd Douglas wrote, "The General was apt to forget it [the horse] was exceptional."

In mid-June 1862, Jackson's forces moved to support Robert E. Lee in what came to be known as the Peninsula campaign, a series of battles to protect the Confederate capital Richmond from Union forces led by General George B. McClellan. Much of it occurred in swampy conditions which were difficult on both men and horses. This led almost without pause to the Northern Virginia campaign, another series of intense battles, including the prominent Confederate victory at the Second Battle of Bull Run, in which there were nearly 22,000 casualties, nearly five times as many as the first battle of Bull Run, fought a year earlier on the same ground.

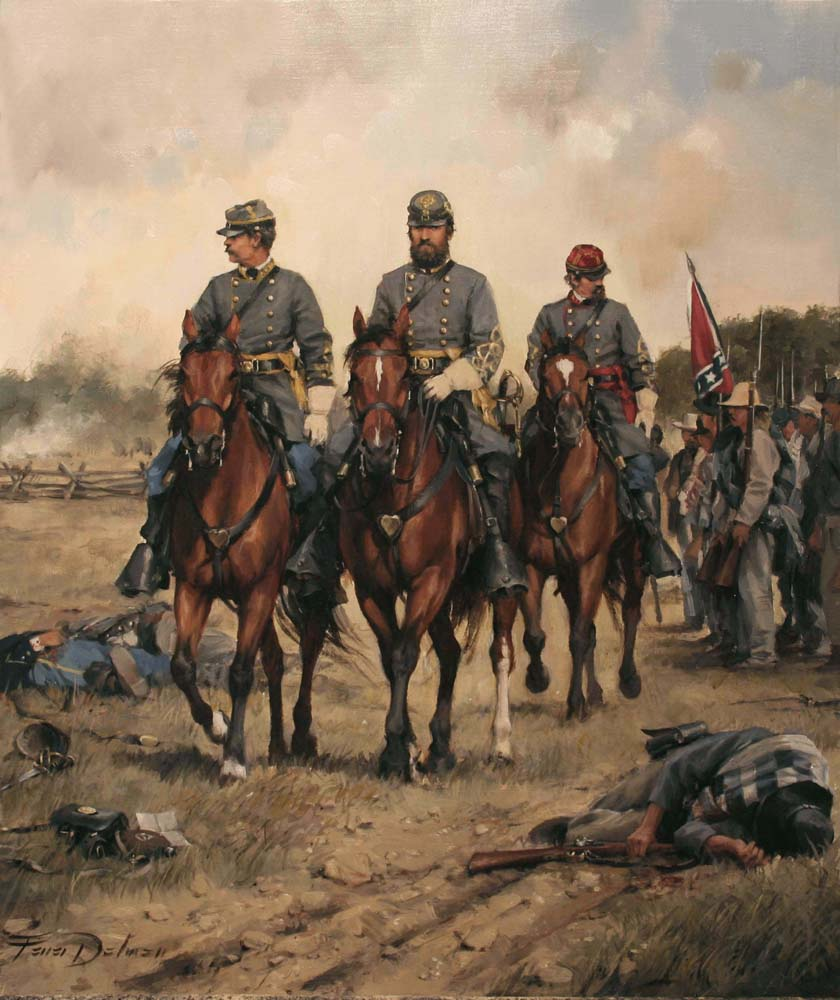
General Jackson by Augusto Ferrer-Dalmau (2011)

Hairs plucked from the horses of famous generals came to be valued as "good luck". In one story, Jackson wanted to interview a captured Union sergeant for intelligence. As the man was waiting, Jackson caught him caressing Little Sorrel's rump, and discovered he was pulling out hairs. The man claimed that the hairs were worth "a dollar each in New York."

Of Little Sorrel, Jackson's biographer James Robertson, Jr. said, "In battle, “Little Sorrel’s” normally soft eyes blazed like his master’s." Yet when the army went into bivouac, the horse had the odd habit of laying down like a dog – sometimes on his back. The normally stern Jackson often treated him like a pet, sometimes feeding him apples when he thought no one was looking. Sharon B. Smith described the horse as "alert during battle but sleepy the rest of the time." Despite having a groom and aides, Jackson cared for the horse himself at times. In one aide's retelling of the reason for a destroyed wash basin: "The General came home late last night and instead of calling a servant, he took care of the horse himself and fed him in this tin wash-basin. The consequence is that the horse put his foot through it and we have nothing to wash in!"

Jackson subsequently fought at Antietam, the single bloodiest day in American history, then in December 1862 at the battle of Fredericksburg. In October of that year Jackson was promoted to lieutenant general, one of the top three generals in the Confederate army behind Lee and James Longstreet, and commanded a Corps.

On April 30, 1863, the same two armies that had engaged at Fredericksburg met again at the battle of Chancellorsville. Chancellorsville was another major conflict, in which there were more than 30,000 casualties. The battle was a significant Confederate victory, but is equally famous in American history as the battle where Stonewall Jackson was accidentally shot by his own troops.

At dusk on May 2, the second day of battle, Jackson and his staff, consisting of 19 men and horses, were returning to camp from a reconnaissance. Confederate pickets mistook the group for Union cavalry and opened fire. Jackson was struck by three bullets, two in the left arm and one in the right hand. Little Sorrel, perhaps also struck, bolted into the woods with Jackson still aboard. Two of Jackson’s men eventually caught up with the horse, took hold of the reins, and got the injured Jackson down. Little Sorrel, however, still in a panic, galloped away towards enemy lines. Of the 19 men, seven were shot or killed, and three were captured when their panicked horses led them into enemy lines. Of the 19 horses, 12 were killed.

Severely injured, Jackson was evacuated to a tavern some miles away. Seeing the shattered left arm, the attending surgeon Hunter McGuire, who knew Jackson well, asked Jackson's permission to amputate the arm, which was granted, and the operation performed. The following day, when one of Jackson's staff entered the room and saw the stump of Jackson's arm, he burst into tears, exclaiming "Oh General, what a calamity!". A deeply religious man, Jackson replied, "You find me severely wounded but not unhappy or depressed...for I am sure that my Heavenly Father designs this affliction for my good. I acquiesce entirely in His holy will." Jackson was moved 27 miles to Guiney's Station, where he appeared to recover over the next few days. However, on May 7 he fell ill with fever and pain, worsened, and on May 10 died of pneumonia. He was attended by his wife Anna, as well as Little Sorrel's groom Jim Lewis. A large crowd of soldiers and officers stood in the yard of the house in prayer, some in disbelief. When Lee was told the news he was stricken and wept openly. "It is a terrible loss. I do not know how to replace him."

Little Sorrel was later found by two Confederate artillery soldiers, neither of whom recognized it as Jackson’s horse. One of the soldiers rode the horse for several days until it was recognized to be Little Sorrel, then was turned over to General J. E. B. Stuart, who had assumed command of Jackson's Corps. Jackson was told of his horse’s recovery on the day that he died. Stuart in turn gave the animal to Anna Jackson, who took Little Sorrel with her to North Carolina to live at her father’s farm.

There are no known photographs of Jackson together with Little Sorrel, but they have been portrayed in a number of paintings and statues over the years.

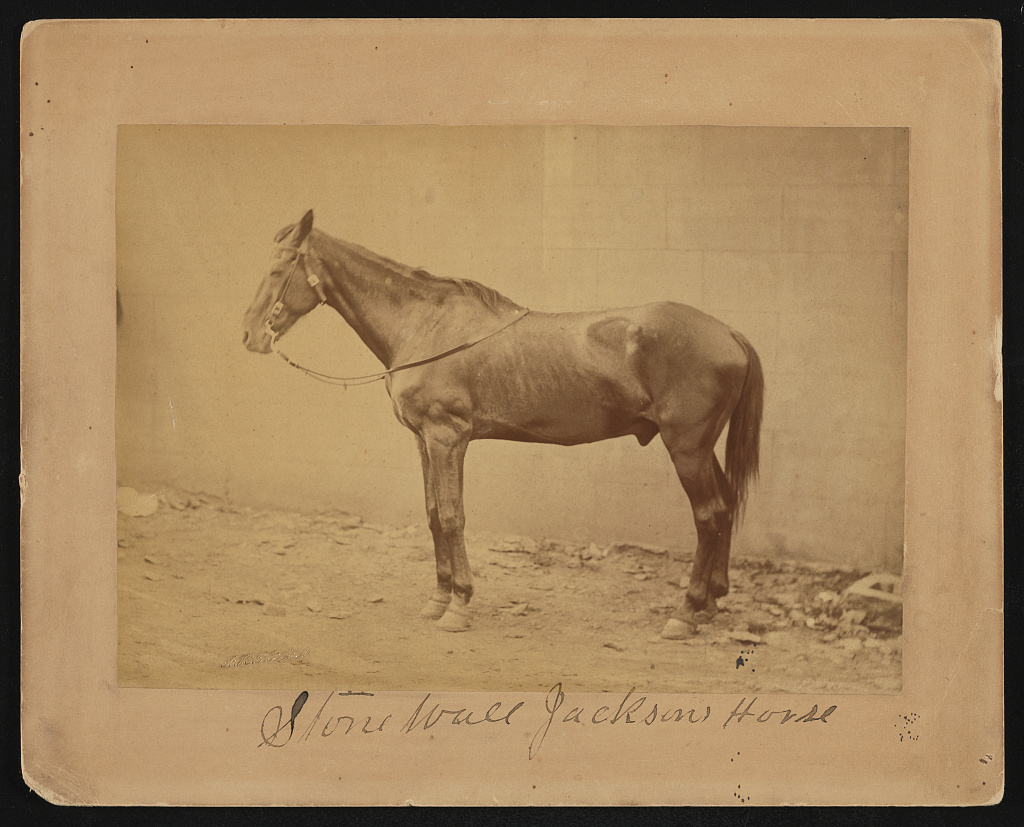
Little Sorrel in 1883

== Post-war life and death ==
The horse lived with Anna Jackson in North Carolina for 20 years, where he was treated as a family pet. In 1883 he was given to the Virginia Military Institute (VMI) in Lexington, Virginia, where Jackson had been a teacher in the 1850s. One cadet remembered that during artillery practice, the aging horse “would come running stiff-legged onto the parade ground, sniffing the air and snorting loudly, head and tail up, limping up and down in front of the line, enjoying the noise and smoke, a comical and pathetic sight, though heart-appealing in the extreme.” In later life visitors continued the practice of pulling hair from his mane and tail for souvenirs, making him nervous.

In 1885 the horse was relocated to the Confederate Soldiers’ Home in Richmond. He died in 1886, at the age of 36. Jackson had been 39 when he died.

Little Sorrel’s hide was removed and a plaster mold of his body was made by noted taxidermist, Frederic S. Webster. The mount was displayed at the VMI Museum, where it currently remains. In 1997, his bones were interred on the VMI grounds, in a ceremony which hundreds of people attended.

In 1997 a statue of a gaunt and exhausted riderless horse, its reins dragging on the ground, entitled "The War Horse", by English sculptor Tessa Pullan, was installed on the grounds of the Virginia Museum of History and Culture, in Richmond. The statue is in memory of the estimated 1.5 million horses and mules which died during the Civil War.

== See also ==
- Traveller (horse)
- List of horses of the American Civil War
- List of historical horses
- War horse

== General and cited references ==
- Korda, Michael (2014). Clouds of Glory: The Life and Legend of Robert E. Lee. HarperCollins Publishers. ISBN 978-0-06-2116291.
- Robertson, Jr., James I. (1997). Stonewall Jackson: The Man, The Soldier, The Legend. Macmillan Publishing. ISBN 0-02-864685-1.
- Smith, Sharon B. (2016). Stonewall Jackson's Little Sorrel: An Unlikely Hero of the Civil War. Lyons Press. ISBN 978-1493019243.
