= Civil War Museum of Philadelphia =

- Former names: Civil War and Underground Railroad Museum of Philadelphia, Civil War Library and Museum
- Established: 1888
- Location: Philadelphia, Pennsylvania, U.S.
- Coordinates: 39.946537°N 75.171799°W
- Type: History museum
- Collections: American Civil War artifacts and portraits
- Chairperson: Mark E. Bender
- Website: civilwarmuseumphila.org

The Civil War Museum of Philadelphia (formerly the Civil War and Underground Railroad Museum of Philadelphia and previously the Civil War Library and Museum) in Philadelphia, Pennsylvania, claims to be the oldest chartered American Civil War institution in the United States. The museum was founded in 1888 by veteran U.S. Army, Navy, and Marine Corps officers.

In 2008, the museum closed to the public in anticipation of a move to other quarters. In June 2016, the museum announced that ownership of its collection of about 3,000 artifacts would transfer to the Gettysburg Museum and Visitor Center, "the non-profit partner of the National Park Service at Gettysburg." Artifacts from the collection will continue to be displayed in Philadelphia at the National Constitution Center. Books, archives, and other two-dimensional material will continue to be owned by the Civil War Museum and are available to researchers at the Heritage Center of the Union League of Philadelphia.

While closed, the collection was stored at the Gettysburg Museum and Visitor Center, where material from the collection was displayed from 2013 to 2015.

== Location ==
On August 7, 2007, the museum announced that it would relocate from 1805 Pine Street near Rittenhouse Square to the former First Bank of the United States building near Independence Hall. Philadelphia Mayor John F. Street presented the museum with a check for $1.2 million to assist in its relocation. On August 2, 2008, the Pine Street location permanently closed and the museum planned to reopen in its new location in 2011.

In 2009, Governor Ed Rendell canceled the state's portion of the funding needed to relocate the museum, prompting the National Park Service to withdraw its offer to use the First Bank building.

== Collection ==
The museum displayed the mounted head of "Old Baldy", the horse that was ridden by U.S. Union Major General George G. Meade during most of the Civil War. Old Baldy's head was mounted in 1882 and restored in 1991. In 2010, it was returned to its owner, the Grand Army of the Republic Museum and Library in the Frankford neighborhood of Philadelphia, which had loaned it to the museum in 1979.

In addition to a large portrait and artifacts associated with General Meade, the museum's collection included personal items from other U.S. generals, including Ulysses S. Grant, John F. Reynolds, and George B. McClellan.

The collection also included a large number of military escutcheons, which were made in the United States from the end of the Civil War until about 1907. They resembled a coat of arms and depicted the military record of a veteran. Usually commissioned by the veteran or his family to memorialize his service, they were produced by an artist using chromolithography.

The museum had items pertaining to Abraham Lincoln, including a cast of his hands, a lock of hair, and a death mask.
