= Clark B. Lagow =

American soldier (1828–1867)

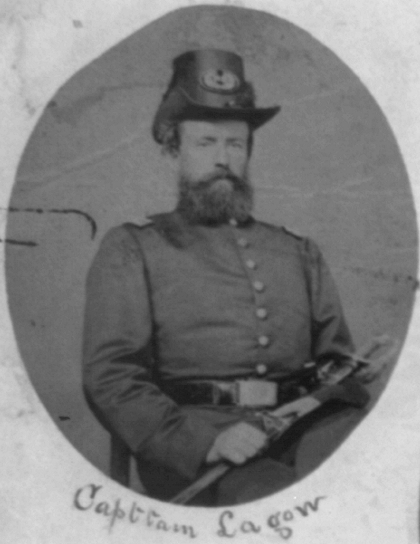
- Portrait of Lagow
- Born: Clark Breading Lagow; November 7, 1828; Crawford County, Illinois, U.S.
- Died: July 16, 1867 (aged 38); Palestine, Illinois, U.S.
- Military career
- Allegiance: United States
- Branch: Union army
- Service years: 1861-1863
- Rank: Colonel
- Unit: 21st Regiment of the Illinois Infantry Volunteers
- Known for: aide-de-camp for Ulysses S. Grant
- Conflicts: American Civil War; Battle of Shiloh; Siege of Vicksburg

Clark Breading Lagow (November 7, 1828 – April 16, 1867) was an American soldier who served on the staff of General Ulysses S. Grant during the American Civil War. He achieved the rank of colonel and served as Grant's aide-de-camp and inspector general.

== Early life ==
Lagow was born in Crawford County, Illinois on November 7, 1828. Lagow grew up in Palestine, Illinois. Ulysses S. Grant said he recalled Lagow visiting his father's farm in Illinois when Lagow was a boy.

== Career ==
=== Business ===
Lagow entered into the wholesale dry goods business of French Lagow & Co. in Evansville, Indiana with William E. French and George W. Dexter on August 11, 1857. That partnership was dissolved in December 1857 when Dexter withdrew.

=== Military ===
During the American Civil War on June 28, 1861, Lagow enlisted in the 21st Regiment of the Illinois Infantry Volunteers as a first lieutenant under Ulysses S. Grant, who was its colonel. When Grant became a brigadier general on August 5, 1861, he appointed Lagow to his staff as the aide-de-camp. However, Lagow postponed the appointment because his wife was dying of tuberculosis in Goshen, New York. After her death on August 30, 1861, he had to make arrangements for their three children, all under the age of five years.

Lagaw reported to Grant in mid-September 1861. In December 1861, Lagaw was noted as having the rank of captain. In 1862, Lagaw was Grant's aide-de-camp and acting inspector general for the headquarters of the Eighteenth Army Corps, Department of Tennessee. During the war, Lagaw was given a horse named Kangaroo as a joke; Grant offered to take Kangaroo and used it as a secondary horse.

After the Battle of Shiloh on May 3, 1862, Lagow was promoted to the rank of colonel, while also continuing to serve as the aide-de-camp. During the Siege of Vicksburg in April 1863, Lagow led a successful expedition of blockade runners made from steamships; he directed operations from The Tigress, also a former steamship.

In the winter of 1863, Lagow began having problems with rheumatoid arthritis and resigned from the military on June 8, 1863.

== Personal life ==
Lagow returned to Palestine, Illinois, but his condition worsened. He died on April 16, 1867. He was buried with his wife in the Lagow family cemetery, southeast of Palestine in Crawford County. In the early 20th century, the unmarked grave of Lagow was accidentally paved as part of a street.
