= Rocky Mountain Horse =

American breed of horse

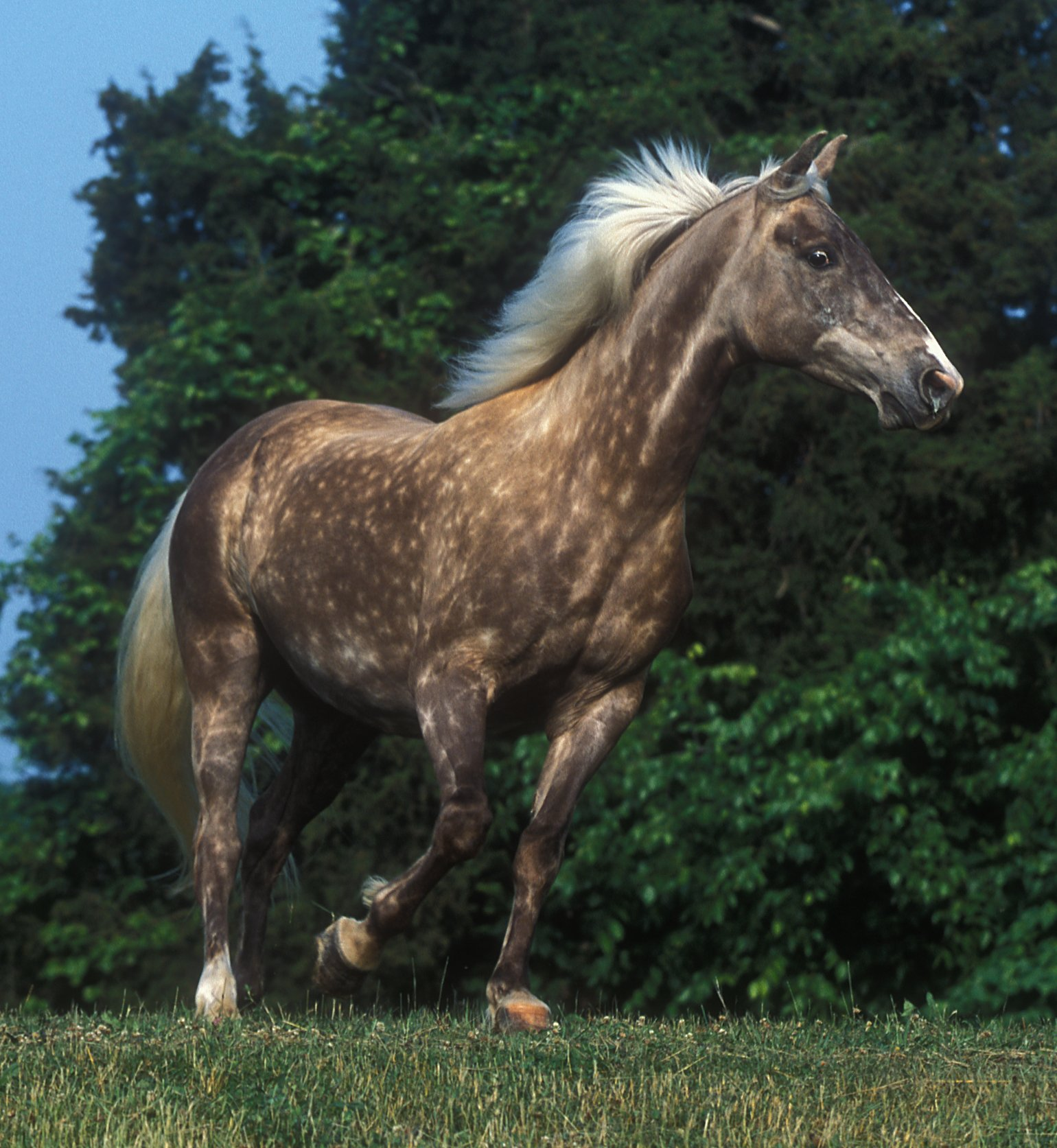

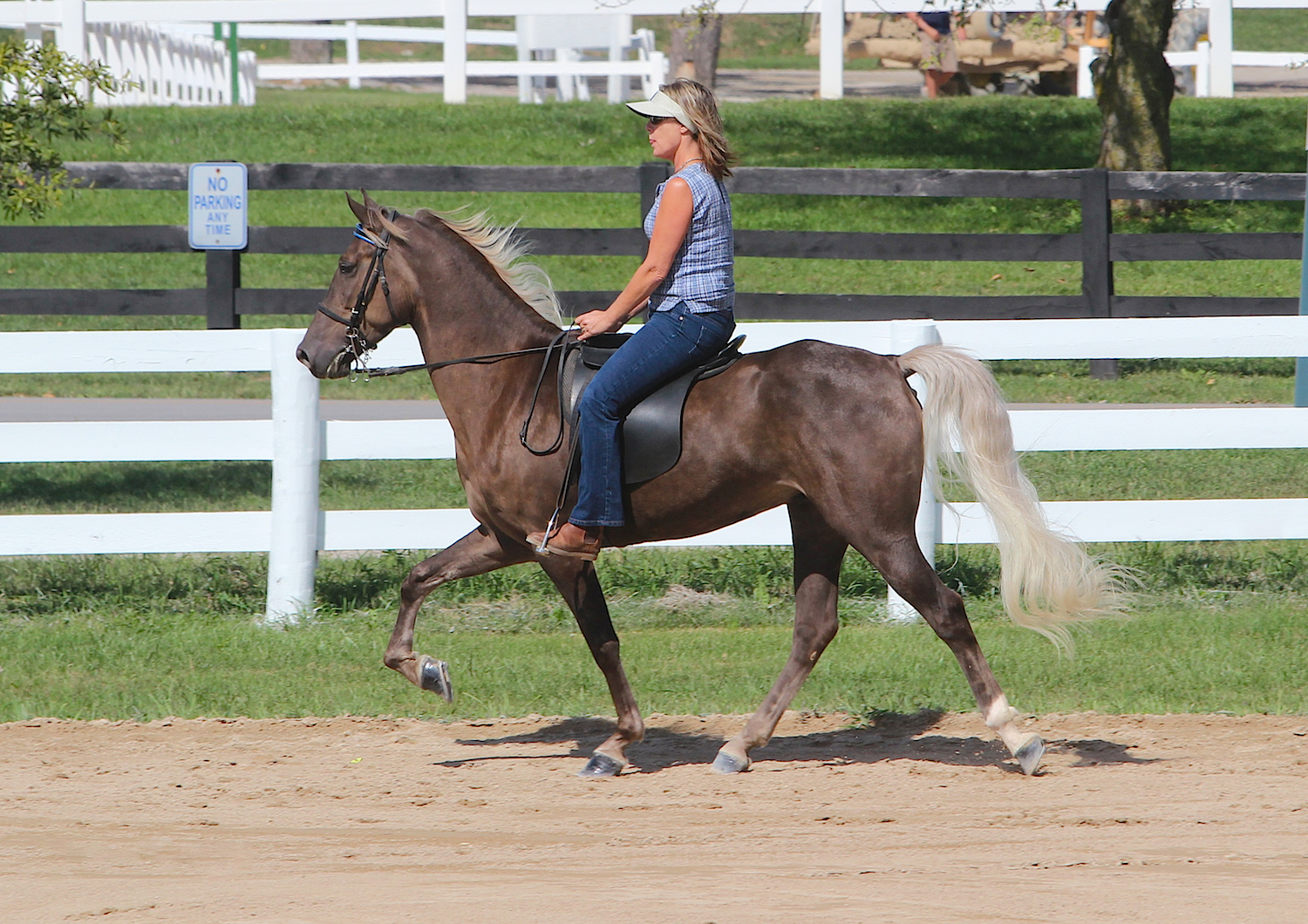
- Other names: RMH
- Country of origin: United States

Traits
- Height: 14 to 16 hands (56 to 64 inches, 142 to 163 cm)
- Color: Any solid color allowed, but Silver dapple coloration preferred
- Distinguishing features: Singlefoot ambling gait

Breed standards
- Rocky Mountain Horse Association

The Rocky Mountain Horse is a horse breed developed in the state of Kentucky in the United States. Despite its name, it originated not in the Rocky Mountains, but instead in the Appalachian Mountains. A foundation stallion, brought from the western United States to eastern Kentucky around 1890, began the Rocky Mountain type in the late 19th century. In the mid-20th century, a stallion named Old Tobe, owned by a prominent breeder, was used to develop the modern type; today most Rocky Mountain Horses trace back to this stallion. In 1986, the Rocky Mountain Horse Association was formed and by 2005 has registered over 12,000 horses. The breed is known for its preferred "chocolate" coat color and flaxen mane and tail, the result of the relatively rare silver dapple gene acting on a black coat, seen in much of the population. It also exhibits a four-beat ambling gait known as the "single-foot". Originally developed as a multi-purpose riding, driving and light draft horse, today it is used mainly for trail riding and working cattle.

== Breed characteristics ==
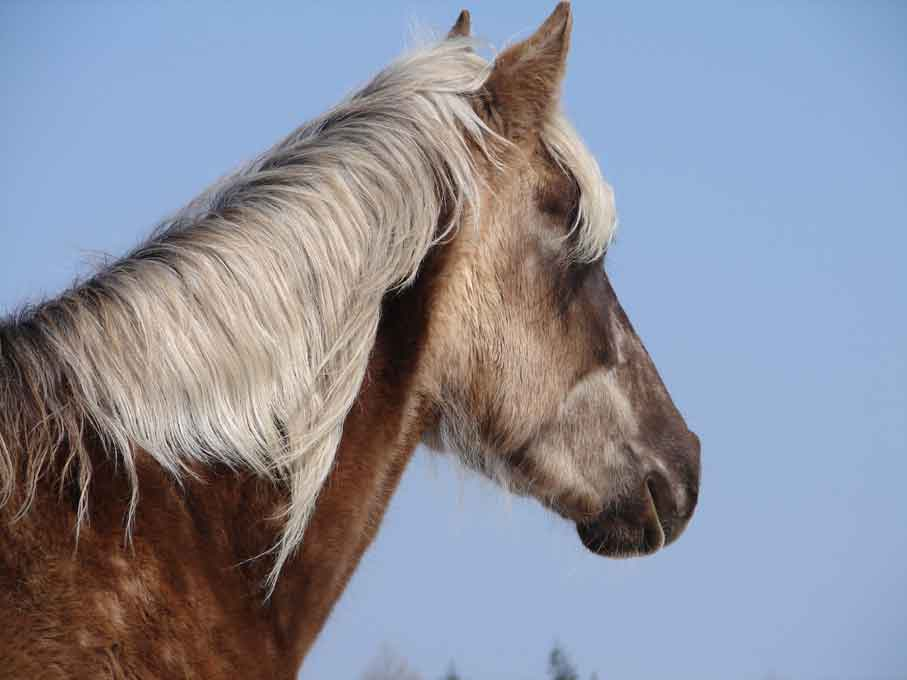
The mane and tail of "chocolate" colored horses are several shades lighter than the coat.

Rocky Mountain Horses stand between 14 and 16 hands (56 and 64 inches, 142 and 163 cm) high. Any solid color is accepted by the registry, but a dark brown color called "chocolate" with a pale, "flaxen" mane and tail is preferred. This coloration is the result of the relatively rare silver dapple gene acting on a black base coat. Although uncommon, this gene has been found in over a dozen breeds, including the Rocky Mountain Horse. Minimal white markings are accepted by the registry, although leg markings may not extend above the knee. The physical characteristics are somewhat variable, due to the disparate breeds that created the Rocky Mountain Horse. The Rocky Mountain Horse is known by enthusiasts for its hardiness and ability to withstand winters in the mountains. It is also praised for its good nature and affinity for humans.

Rocky Mountain Horses have the highest risk of any breed for the genetic ocular syndrome multiple congenital ocular anomalies (MCOA), originally called equine anterior segment dysgenesis (ASD). MCOA is characterized by the abnormal development of some ocular tissues, which causes compromised vision, although generally of a mild form; the disease is non-progressive. Genetic studies from 2008 have shown that the disorder may be tied to the silver dapple gene, as most horses diagnosed with MCOA carry the gene. A 2017 report by Jessica Fragola and Leandro Teixeira in Investigative Ophthalmology & Visual Science entitled "Microphthalmia with multiple ocular abnormalities in 11 horses: a novel syndrome" noted a novel ocular syndrome in horses characterized by bilateral microphthalmia and aphakia associated with multiple ocular abnormalities, and given the predominance of anterior segment lesions, a defect during the embryological development of the lens placode was suspected.

The breed exhibits a natural ambling gait, called the single-foot, which replaces the trot seen in a majority of horse breeds. Both gaits are an intermediate speed between a walk and a canter or gallop; ambling gaits are four-beat gaits, whereas the trot is a two-beat gait. The extra footfalls provide additional smoothness to a rider because the horse always has at least one foot on the ground. This minimizes movement of the horse's topline and removes the bounce of a two-beat gait, caused by a moment of suspension followed by the jolt of two feet hitting the ground as the horse shifts from one pair of legs to the other. The value of an intermediate speed is that the horse conserves energy. More than thirty horse breeds are "gaited," able to perform a four-beat ambling gait, and some can also trot. Thus, a Rocky Mountain Horse, with rider, can use the single-foot to cover rough ground at around 7 miles per hour (11 km/h) and short stretches of smooth ground at up to 16 miles per hour (26 km/h). The faster speed is known as the rack. In comparison, the average medium trot speed is 6 to 8 miles per hour (9.7 to 12.9 km/h).

== Breed history ==
Eastern Kentucky is known for its gaited breeds, created through a mixture of Spanish horses from the southern United States and English horses from the North. American Saddlebreds, Tennessee Walking Horses and Missouri Fox Trotters also originated in the same general geographic area, from the same mixing of Spanish and English blood. Rocky Mountain Horses have a similar history to the Kentucky Mountain Saddle Horse, and together are sometimes called "Mountain Pleasure Horses". The Rocky Mountain Horse originated in eastern Kentucky from a foundation stallion brought to the Appalachian Mountains from the Rocky Mountains around 1890. Brought to the area as a colt, oral histories state that the "Rocky Mountain Horse", as he was known, possessed the preferred chocolate color and flaxen mane and tail found in the breed today, as well as the single-foot gait. He was used to breed local saddle mares, and due to the small area in which he was bred, a local strain of horse originated.

This foundation stallion produced a descendant, named Old Tobe, who became the more modern father of the Rocky Mountain Horse breed. Old Tobe was owned by a resident of Spout Springs, Kentucky named Sam Tuttle. For most of the 20th century, Tuttle was a prominent breeder of Rocky Mountain Horses, and helped to keep the strain alive during the Great Depression and World War II. After World War II, despite declining horse populations in the US, Tuttle kept his herd, and continued to use Old Tobe as a breeding stallion. Tuttle held the Natural Bridge State Park concession for horseback riding, and used Old Tobe for trail rides in the park and for siring additional trail horses, the latter until the stallion was 34 years old. Old Tobe died at the age of 37. The presence of the single-foot gait makes it possible that the breed is in part descended from the Narragansett Pacer, a breed known for passing its gaited ability on to other American breeds.

In 1986, the Rocky Mountain Horse Association was created to increase population numbers and promote the breed; there were only 26 horses in the first batch of registrations. Since then, the association has, over the life of the registry, registered over 25000 horses as of 2015, and the breed has spread to 47 states and 11 countries. In order to be accepted by the registry, a foal's parentage must be verified via DNA testing. Horses must also, after reaching 23 months of age, be inspected to ensure that they meet the physical characteristic and gait requirements of the registry. The Rocky Mountain Horse is listed at "threatened" status by The Livestock Conservancy.

The breed was originally developed for general use on the farms of the Appalachian foothills, where it was found pulling plows and buggies, working cattle and being ridden by both adults and children. Today, it is still used for working cattle, as well as endurance riding and pleasure riding. The breed's gait and disposition make it sought out by elderly and disabled riders. Each September, the Kentucky Horse Park hosts the International Rocky Mountain Horse Show.
