= Narragansett Pacer =

First horse breed developed in the US

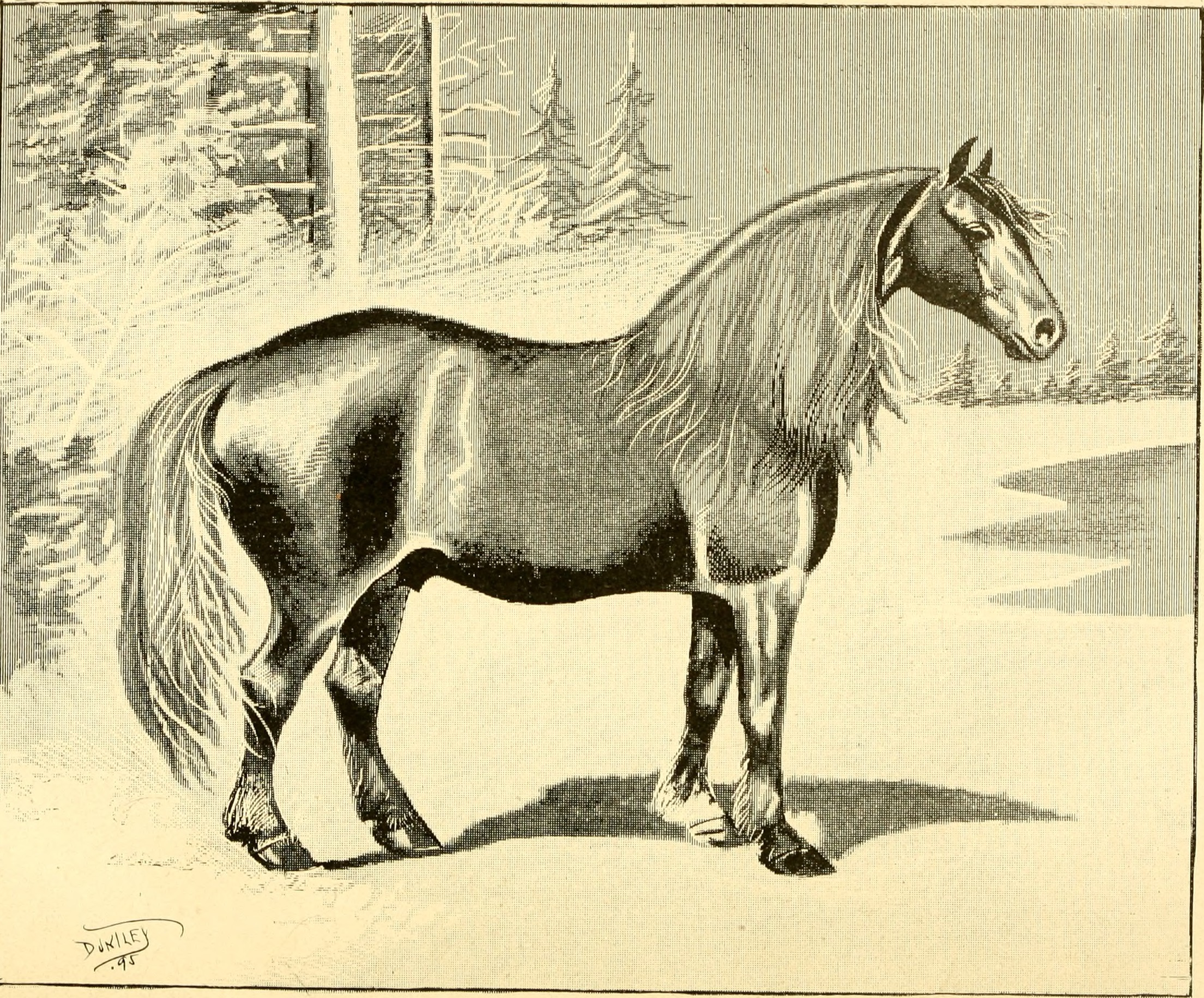
The Narragansett Pacer, illustrated in 1895

The Narragansett Pacer was the first horse breed developed in the United States during the 18th century from a mix of English and Spanish breeds, although the exact cross is unknown. It was closely associated with the state of Rhode Island, but it became extinct by the late 19th century. The Pacer was owned by many famous people of the day, including George Washington. The last known Pacer died around 1880.

The Pacer was known as a sure-footed, dependable breed, although not flashy or always good-looking. Pacers were used for racing and general riding. They provided the foundation for several other American breeds, including the American Saddlebred, Standardbred, and Tennessee Walking Horse.

== History ==
The Narragansett Pacer had a major influence on many American gaited horse breeds. It was especially associated with the state of Rhode Island in the early 18th century but became extinct by the late 19th century. It was known as the first breed of horse developed in America. The origin of the breed is unknown, but it was probably developed from a cross between English "ambling" horses and Spanish breeds. The horses developed from this cross were known for their smoothness and sure-footedness over poor terrain. The English horses which contributed to the Narragansett Pacer may have been members of the Irish Hobby breed; another possible ancestor is the Galloway pony. In the early 18th century, Rhode Island Lieutenant Governor William Robinson began the serious development of the breed with a stallion named "Old Snip", speculated to be either an Irish Hobby or an Andalusian and considered the father of the breed.

In 1768, George Washington owned and raced a Narragansett Pacer, and Edmund Burke asked an American friend for a pair in 1772. Paul Revere possibly rode a Pacer during his 1775 ride to warn the Americans of the British attack. Historian Sharon B. Smith argued that Stonewall Jackson's horse Little Sorrel, born in 1850, is commonly mis-identified as a Morgan, but its characteristics indicated it was in reality a Narragansett Pacer, or a variant thereof. The extinction of the breed was due mainly to it being sold in such large numbers to sugarcane planters in the West Indies that breeding stock was severely diminished in the United States. The few horses that were left were crossbred to create and improve other breeds, and the pure strain of the Narragansett soon became extinct. North Carolina also had breeders of the Narragansett, as the breeding stock was brought to the area around 1790 by pioneers. The last known Pacer died around 1880.

== Characteristics ==
The Narragansett Pacer was not exclusively a pacing horse, as evidence indicates that it exhibited an ambling gait. The amble is more comfortable to ride than the pace gait, and Narragansett Pacers were known for their qualities as riding and driving horses. They averaged around 14.1 hands (57 inches, 145 cm) tall and were generally chestnut in color. James Fenimore Cooper described them: "They have handsome foreheads, the head clean, the neck long, the arms and legs thin and tapered." Dutson states: "They are very spirited and carry both the head and tail high. But what is more remarkable is that they amble with more speed than most horses trot, so that it is difficult to put some of them upon a gallop." Other viewers of the breed rarely called them stylish or good-looking, although they considered them dependable, easy to work with, and sure-footed.

== Uses ==
The breed was used for "pacing races" in Rhode Island, where the Baptist population allowed races when the greater part of Puritan New England did not. Pacers reportedly covered the one-mile tracks in a little more than two minutes.

The Narragansett Pacer played a significant role in the creation of the American Saddlebred, the Standardbred and the Tennessee Walking Horse. The breed was also combined with French pacers to create the Canadian Pacer, a breed especially suited to racing over ice and which also contributed substantially to the creation of the Standardbred. In the early 19th century, Pacer mares were bred to stallions of the fledgling Morgan breed. However, the Morgan breed was selected for a trot as an intermediate gait, and thus ambling horses were frowned upon, so most Narragansett/Morgan crosses were sold to Canada, the Caribbean, and South America, so the bloodlines did not remain within the Morgan breed. Other breeds indirectly influenced by the Narragansett Pacer include the Rocky Mountain Horse, a gaited breed started in Kentucky, and the Tiger Horse, a gaited breed with Appaloosa patterning.
