= Feral horse =

Free horses of domesticated horse ancestry

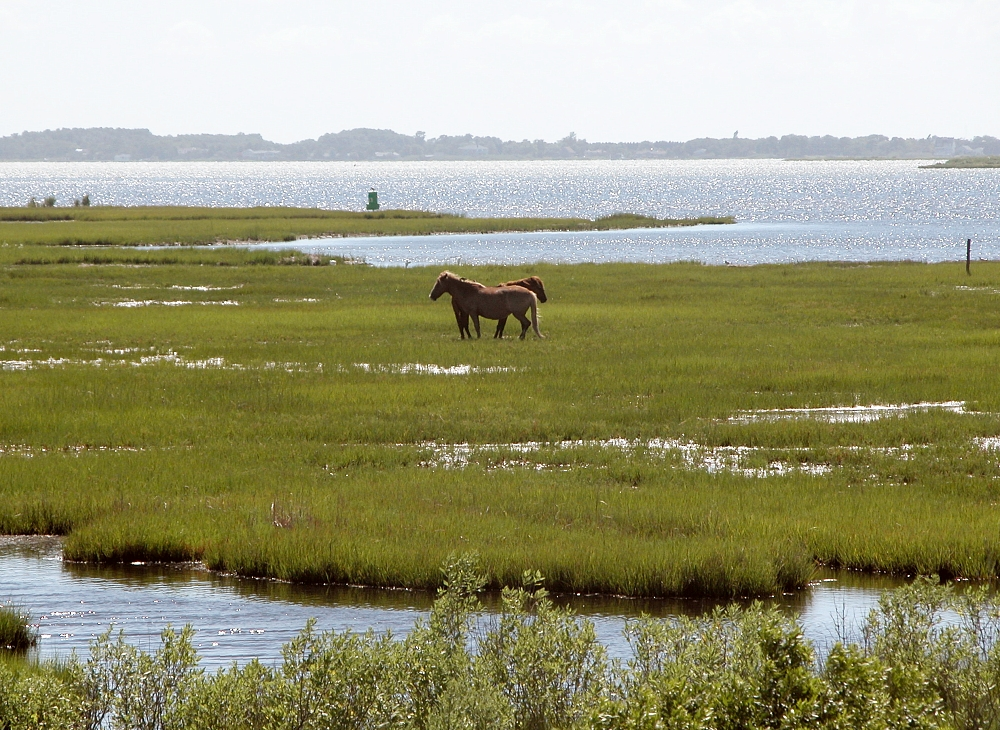
Feral Chincoteague ponies on Assateague Island, Virginia

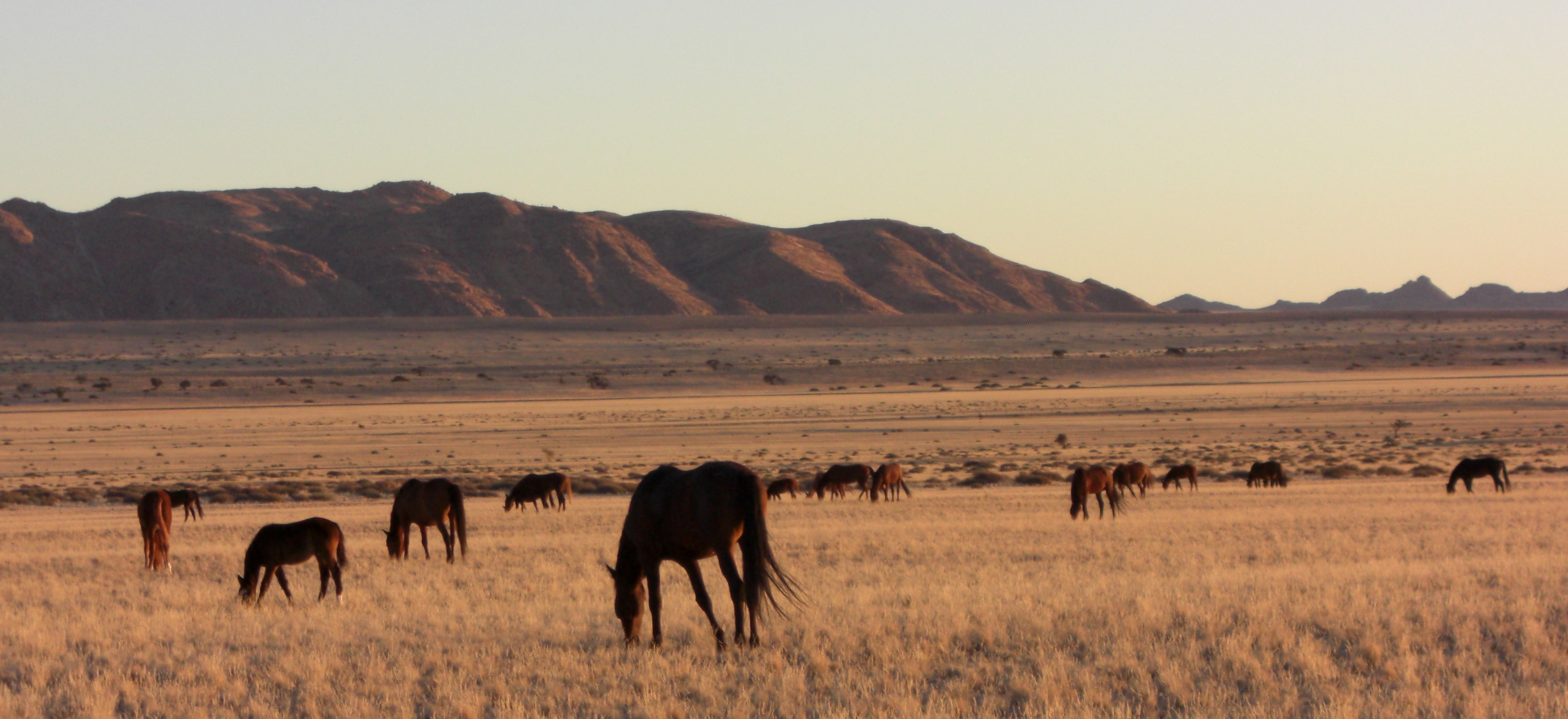
Feral horses of the Namib

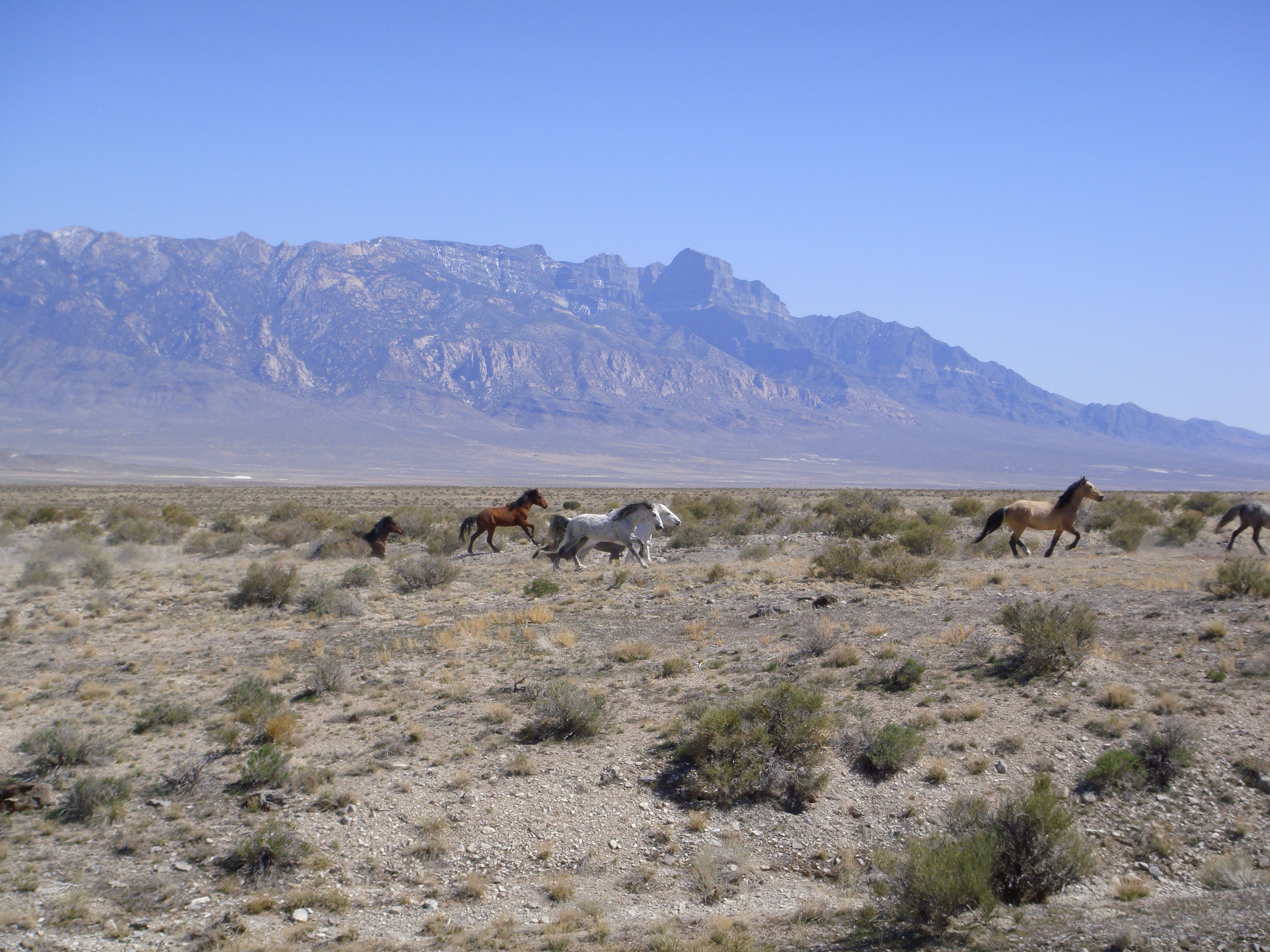
Feral horses in Tule Valley, Utah

A feral horse is a free-roaming horse of domesticated stock. As such, a feral horse is not a wild animal in the sense of an animal without domesticated ancestors. However, some populations of feral horses are managed as wildlife, and these horses often are popularly called "wild" horses. Feral horses are descended from domestic horses that strayed, escaped, or were deliberately released into the wild and remained to survive and reproduce there. Away from humans, over time, these animals' patterns of behavior revert to patterns more closely resembling those of wild horses. Some horses that live in a feral state but may be occasionally handled or managed by humans, particularly if privately owned, are referred to as "semi-feral".

Feral horses live in groups called a herd, band, harem, or mob. Feral horse herds, like those of wild horses, are usually made up of small harems led by a dominant mare, containing additional mares, their foals, and immature horses of both sexes. There is usually one herd stallion, though occasionally a few less-dominant males may remain with the group. Such herds in the wild are best described as groups of several small bands who share the same territory. Bands are normally on the small side, with as few as three to five animals, but sometimes over a dozen. The makeup of bands shifts over time as young animals are driven out of the band they were born into and join other bands, or as young stallions challenge older males for dominance. However, in a closed ecosystem (such as the isolated refuges in which most feral horses live today), to maintain genetic diversity, the minimum size for a sustainable free-roaming horse or burro population is 150–200 animals.

== Feral horse populations ==
=== Americas ===
Many prehistoric horse species, now extinct, evolved in North America, but the horses living there today are the offspring of horses that were domesticated elsewhere.

The best-known examples of modern-day feral horses are those of the American West. Europeans introduced modern domesticated horses (Equus caballus) to the Americas in the late 15th century. This began with the arrival of the Spanish conquistadors in the 15th century, where some horses escaped and formed feral herds known today as mustangs. In the Western United States, certain bands of horses and burros are protected under the Wild and Free-Roaming Horses and Burros Act of 1971. Those so unprotected are often subject to the laws governing estray livestock in the states where they are found and are not de facto property of the owner whose land they inhabit. There are about 300,000 horses today in multiple land jurisdictions across the country, including tribal lands.

Isolated populations of feral horses occur in a number of places in North America, including Assateague Island off the coast of Virginia and Maryland, Elko, Nevada, the Salt River in Arizona, and Cumberland Island, Georgia, Vieques Island off the coast of Puerto Rico, and Sable Island off the coast of Nova Scotia, Canada.

Some of these horses are said to be the descendants of horses that managed to swim to land when they were shipwrecked. Others may have been deliberately brought to various islands by settlers and either left to reproduce freely or abandoned when assorted human settlements failed.

=== Asia ===
The only truly wild horses in existence today are Przewalski's horses, native to the steppes of central Asia.

A modern feral horse population (janghali ghura) is found in the Dibru-Saikhowa National Park and Biosphere reserve of Assam, in north-east India, and is a herd of about 79 horses descended from animals that escaped army camps during World War II. In Ashuradeh Island in Iran, feral horses can also be found. Further, it is said that the wild horses of the Miankaleh Wildlife Refuge are the descendants of Russian domestic horses that remained on the peninsula after its occupation by Russia in 1837.

=== Europe ===
In Portugal, a population of free-ranging horses, known as garrano, lives in the northern mountain chains. These horses are also present in Galicia, where they have a long history with the local populations embodied in the Rapa das Bestas rituals.

In County Kerry, Ireland, wild bog ponies have been known since at least the 1300s.

More than 700 feral wild horses live in the foothills of Cincar Mountain, between Livno and Kupres, Bosnia and Herzegovina, in an area of roughly 145 km^{2} (56 sq mi). These animals, which descend from horses set free by their owners in the 1950s, enjoy a protected status since 2010.

In Sardinia lives the Giara Horse, a wild variety that inhabits the Giara di Gesturi, a basaltic plateau in the southern central part of the island. The population is composed by about 700 horses.

=== Oceania ===
Australia has the largest feral horse population in the world, numbering about 400,000. The Australian name equivalent to the mustang is the brumby, descendants of horses brought to Australia by British settlers.

== Modern feral horses ==
Modern types of feral horses that have a significant percentage of their number living in a feral state, though domesticated representatives may exist, include these types, landraces, and breeds:

Africa

- Kundudo horse, in the Kundudo region, Ethiopia; threatened with extinction
- Namib desert horse in Namibia

North America
see also Free-roaming horse management in North America

- Alberta Mountain Horse or Alberta Wildie, in the foothills of the Eastern Slopes of the Rocky Mountains of Alberta, Canada
- Banker horse on the Outer Banks of North Carolina, United States
- Chincoteague Pony on Assateague Island off the coasts of Virginia and Maryland, United States
- Cumberland Island horse on Cumberland Island off the coast of southern Georgia, United States
- Elegesi Qiyus Wild Horse (Cayuse) in the Nemaiah Valley, British Columbia, Canada
- Mustang in the western United States, legally protected by the Wild and Free-Roaming Horses and Burros Act of 1971
- Nokota horse in North Dakota, United States
- Sable Island horse on Sable Island, Nova Scotia, Canada
- Wild Ponies of the Bronson Forest in Saskatchewan, Canada

South America

- Lavradeiros in northern Brazil
- Small wild horses are established in the páramos of the Sierra Nevada de Santa Marta in Colombia and are believed to have descended from introductions made by Spanish conquistadors.
- A small population of feral horses lives in the foothills of Cordillera Real next to the city of La Paz in Bolivia; these individuals wander the high-altitude grassland up to 4700 m above sea level. The origin of this highly endangered herd is not well-known.
- The huge population that inhabits southern Brazil and the region of Patagonia, the Bagual.

Asia

- Misaki horse in Cape Toi, Japan
- Delft Island Horse on Neduntheevu or Delft Island, Sri Lanka. Feral Horses are believed to be the descendants of horses kept on the island from the time of Dutch occupation in Sri Lanka.
- Yılkı horse in the Kızılırmak Delta and other places in Turkey

Europe

- Danube Delta Horse, in and around Letea Forest, Romania
- Garrano, a feral horse native to northern Portugal and Galicia
- Giara horse in Sardinia
- Marismeño in the Doñana National Park in Huelva, Spain
- Konik, predominantly domesticated, but the biggest feral herd in the world lives in the Oostvaardersplassen reserve in the Netherlands.
- Welsh Pony, mostly domesticated, but a feral population of about 180 animals roams the Carneddau hills of North Wales. Other populations roam the eastern parts of the Brecon Beacons National Park

Oceania

- Brumby in Australia
- Kaimanawa horse in New Zealand
- Marquesas Islands horse on Ua Huka, Marquesas Islands, French Polynesia

== Semi-feral horses ==
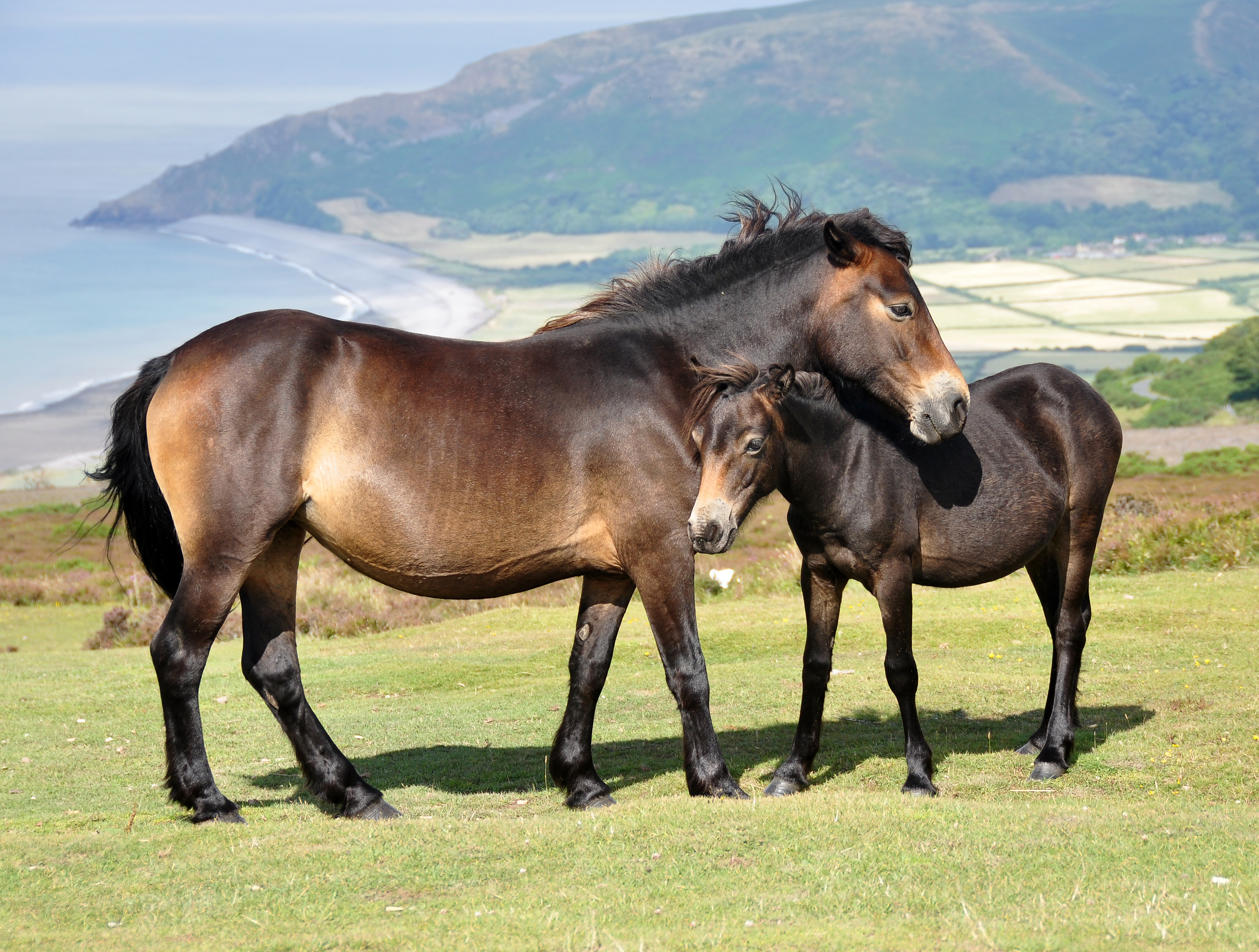
Semi-feral Exmoor ponies on Porlock common, Exmoor: They are gathered each year to remove foals and assess stock.

In the United Kingdom, herds of free-roaming ponies live in apparently wild conditions in various areas, notably Dartmoor, Exmoor, Cumbria (Fell Pony), and the New Forest. Similar horse and pony populations exist elsewhere on the European continent. These animals, however, are not truly feral, as all of them are privately owned, and roam out on the moors and forests under common grazing rights belonging to their owners. A proportion of them are halter-broken, and a smaller proportion broken to ride, but simply turned out for a while for any of a number of reasons (e.g., a break in training to allow them to grow on, a break from working to allow them to breed under natural conditions, or retirement). In other cases, the animals may be government-owned and closely managed on controlled reserves.

- Camargue horse, in marshes of the Rhone delta, southern France.
- Dartmoor pony, England; predominantly domesticated, also lives in semi-feral herds.
- Exmoor pony, England; predominantly domesticated, also lives in semi-feral herds.
- Fell pony, predominantly domesticated, also lives in semi-feral herds in northern England, particularly Cumbria.
- Gotlandsruss, lives in a semi-feral herd in Lojsta Moor on the Swedish Island of Gotland.
- New Forest pony, predominantly domesticated, also lives in semi-feral herds in the area of Hampshire, England.
- Pottok, predominantly domesticated, also lives in semi-feral herds in the western Pyrenees.
- Dülmen pony, a German pony that lives in a wild herd in Westphalia with little help by humans.
- Shetland pony, Scotland; predominantly used for riding, driving, and pack purposes.

== Population impacts ==
Feral populations are usually controversial, with livestock producers often at odds with horse aficionados and other animal welfare advocates. Different habitats are impacted in different ways by feral horses. Where feral horses had wild ancestors indigenous to a region, a controlled population may have minimal environmental impact, particularly when their primary territory is one where they do not compete with domesticated livestock to any significant degree. However, in areas where they are an introduced species, such as Australia, or if the population is allowed to exceed available range, there can be significant impacts on soil, vegetation (including overgrazing), and animals that are native species.

If a feral population lives close to civilization, their behavior can lead them to damage human-built livestock fencing and related structures. In some cases, where feral horses compete with domestic livestock, particularly on public lands where multiple uses are permitted, such as in the Western United States, there is considerable controversy over which species is most responsible for degradation of rangeland, with commercial interests often advocating for the removal of the feral horse population to allow more grazing for cattle or sheep, and advocates for feral horses recommending reduction in the numbers of domestic livestock allowed to graze on public lands.

Certain populations have considerable historic or sentimental value, such as the Chincoteague pony that lives on Assateague Island, a national seashore with a delicate coastal ecosystem, or the Misaki pony of Japan that lives on a small refuge within the municipal boundaries of Kushima. These populations manage to thrive with careful management that includes using the animals to promote tourism to support the local economy. Most sustained feral populations are managed by various forms of culling, which, depending on the nation and other local conditions, may include capturing excess animals for adoption or sale. In some nations, management may include the often-controversial practice of selling captured animals for slaughter or simply shooting them. Fertility control is also sometimes used, though it is expensive and has to be repeated on a regular basis.

== See also ==
- Horse behavior
- List of BLM Herd Management Areas
- Mustang Heritage Foundation
