= Feral =

Normally domestic animal that lives in the wild

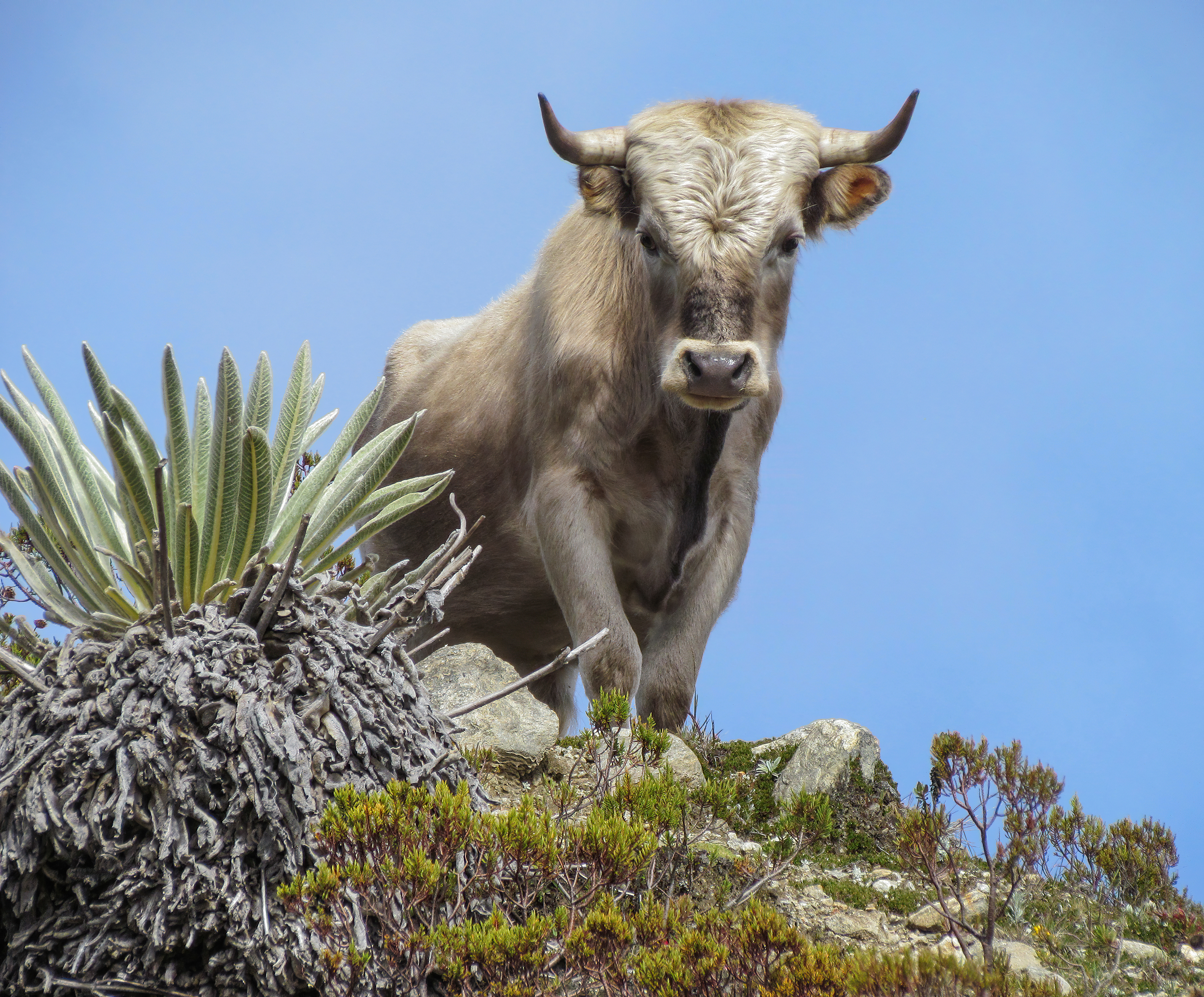
Feral bull in Sierra Nevada de Mérida, Venezuela

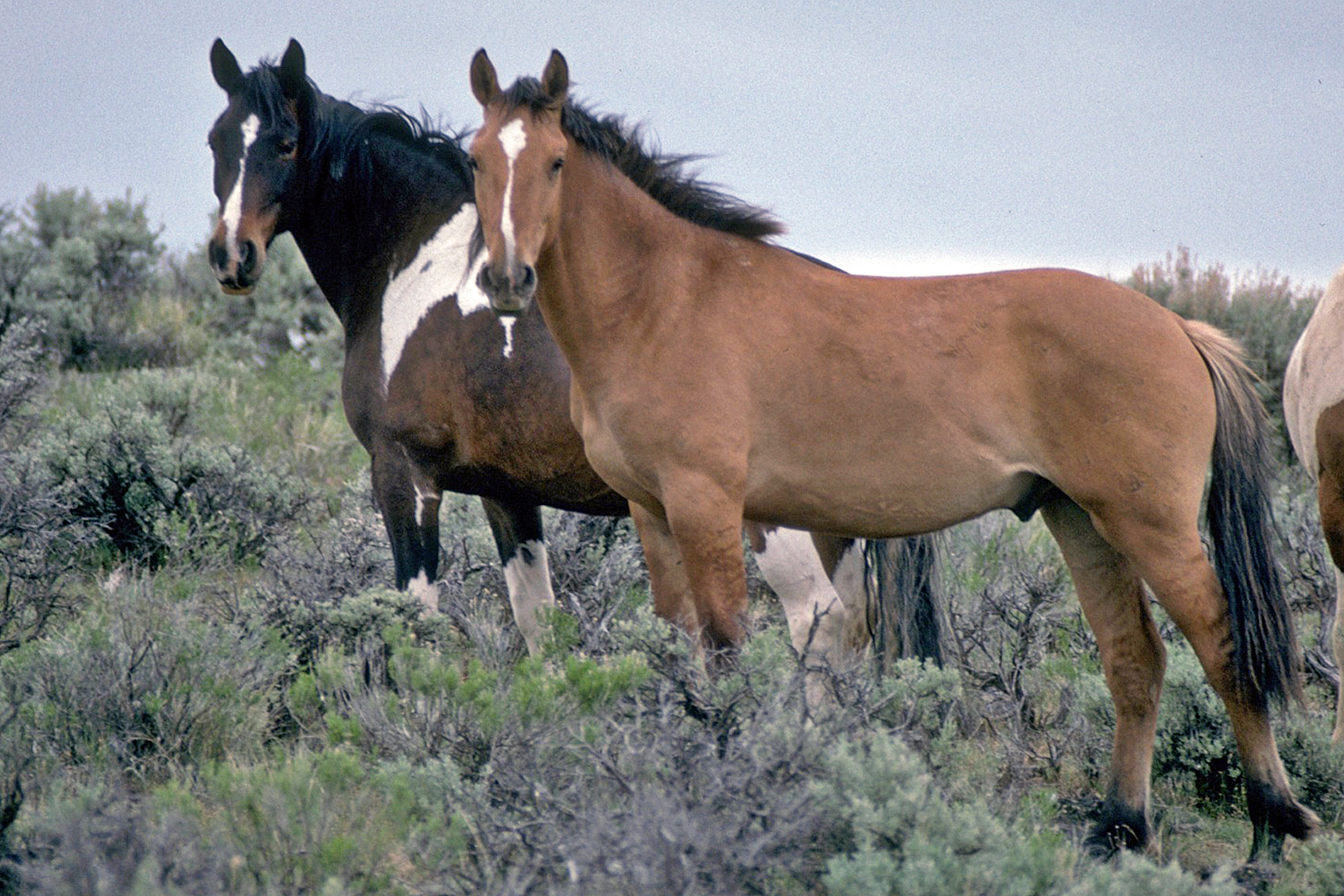
Feral horses (mustangs) in Oregon

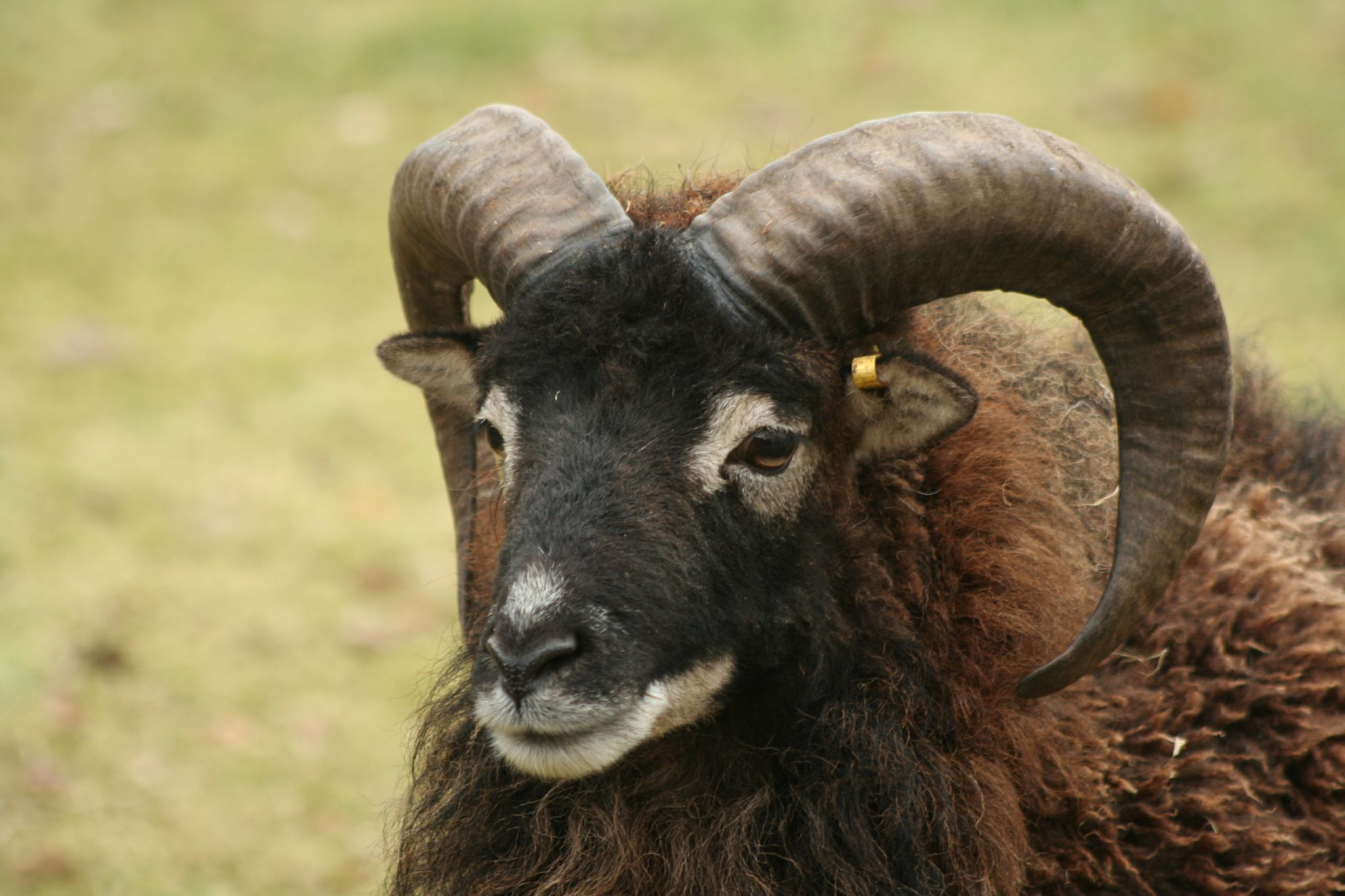
Soay sheep in St Kilda, Scotland

A feral (/ˈfɛrəl/; from Latin fera 'a wild beast') animal or plant is one that lives in the wild but is descended from domesticated individuals. As with an introduced species, the introduction of feral animals or plants to non-native regions may disrupt ecosystems and has, in some cases, contributed to extinction of indigenous species. The removal of feral species is a major focus of island restoration.

== Animals ==
A feral animal is one that has escaped from a domestic or captive status and is living more or less as a wild animal, or one that is descended from such animals. Other definitions include animals that have changed from being domesticated to being wild, natural, or untamed. Some common examples of animals with feral populations are horses, dogs, goats, cats, rabbits, camels, and pigs. Zoologists generally exclude from the feral category animals that were genuinely wild before they escaped from captivity: neither lions escaped from a zoo nor the white-tailed eagles re-introduced to the UK are regarded as feral.

== Plants ==
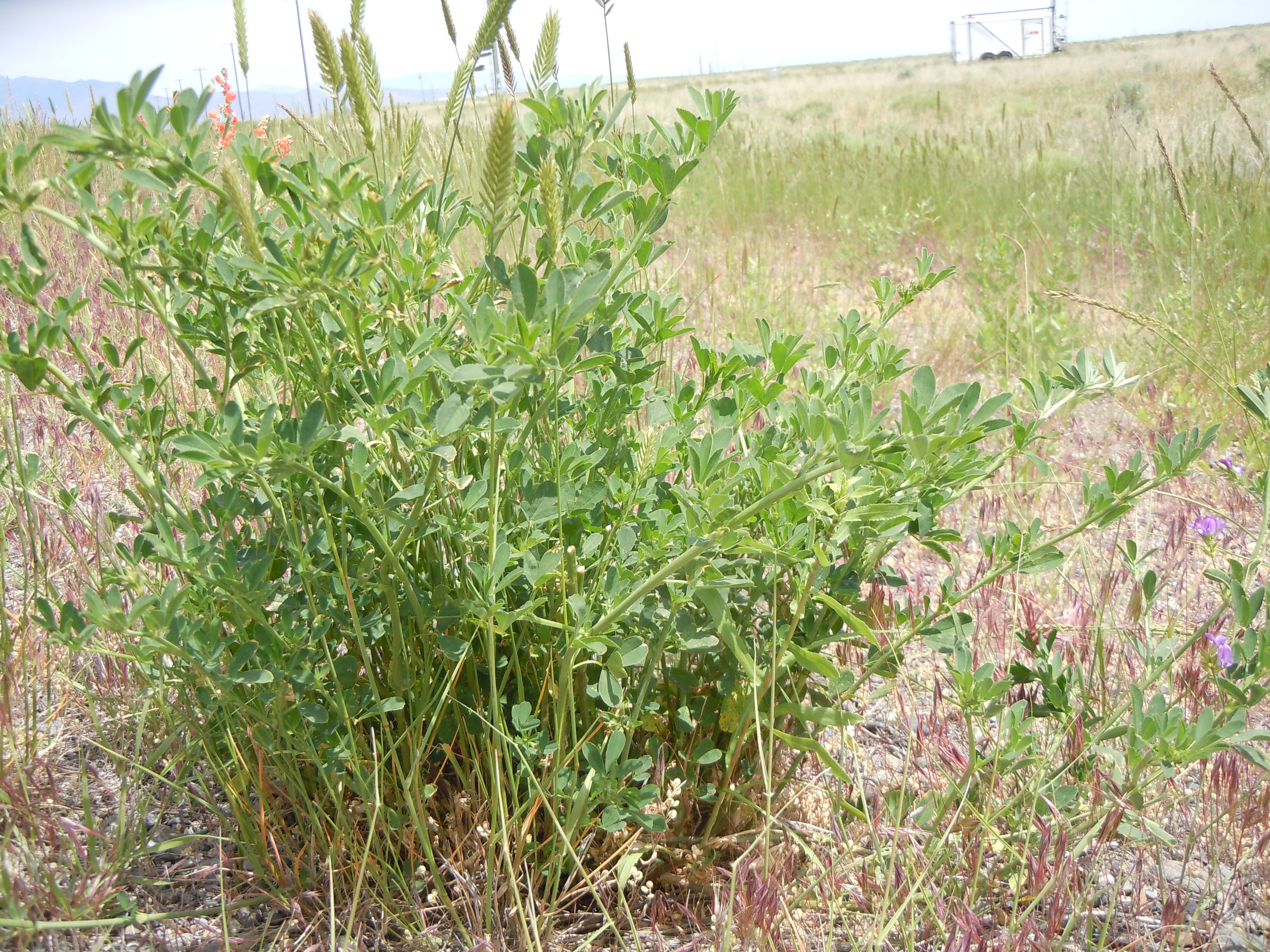
Alfalfa plants, Medicago sativa, colonize roadsides

Domesticated plants that revert to wild are referred to as escaped, introduced, naturalized, or sometimes as feral crops. Individual plants are known as volunteers. Large numbers of escaped plants may become a noxious weed. The adaptive and ecological variables seen in plants that go wild closely resemble those of animals. Feral populations of crop plants, along with hybridization between crop plants and their wild relatives, brings a risk that genetically engineered characteristics such as pesticide resistance could be transferred to weed plants. The unintended presence of genetically modified crop plants or of the modified traits in other plants as a result of cross-breeding is known as "adventitious presence (AP)".

== Species of feral animals ==
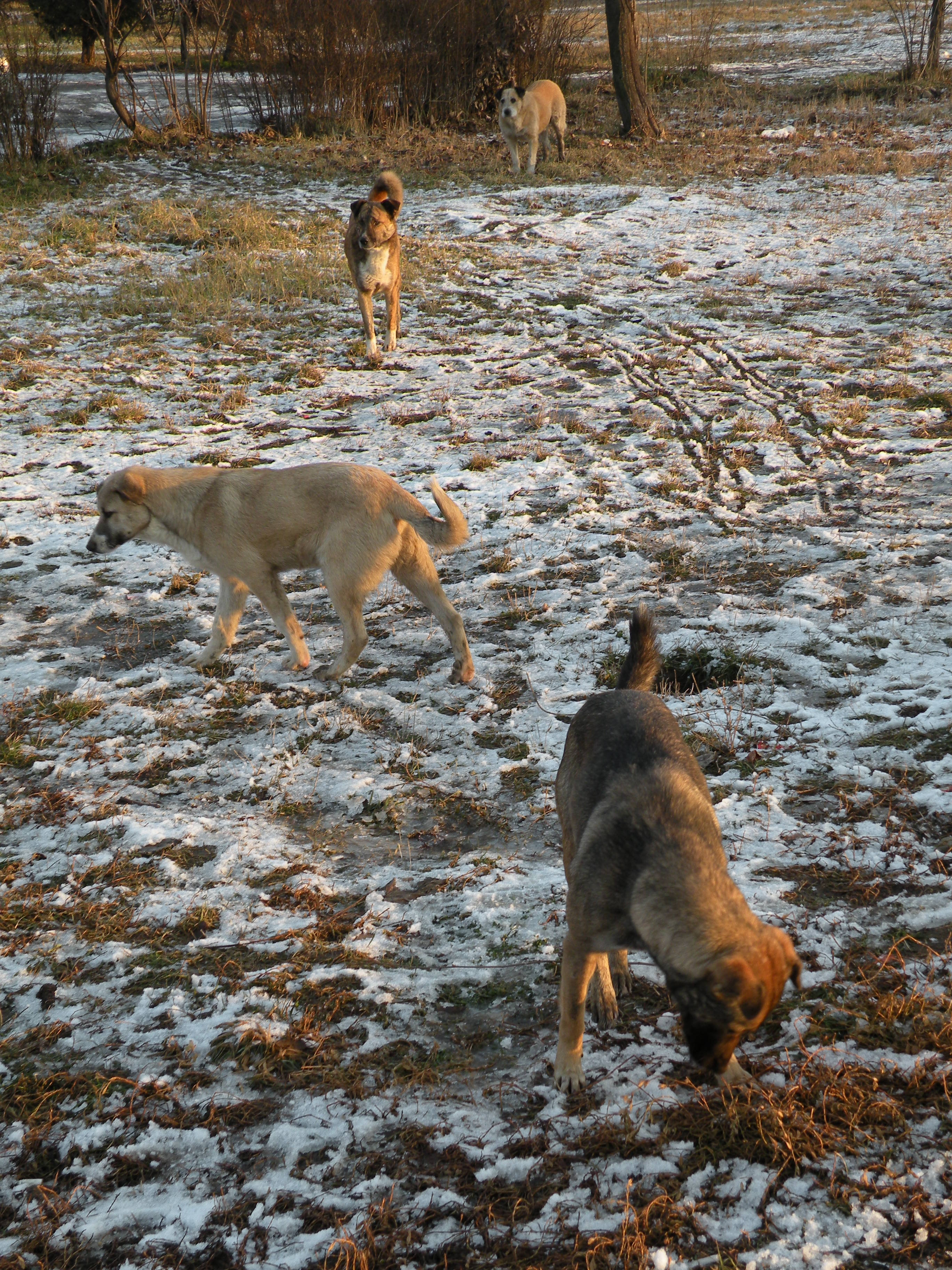
Feral dogs in Bucharest

The cat returns readily to a feral state if it has not been socialized when young. Feral cats, especially if left to proliferate, are frequently considered to be pests in both rural and urban areas, and may be blamed for devastating the bird, reptile, and mammal populations. A local population of feral cats living in an urban area and using a common food source is sometimes called a feral cat colony. As feral cats multiply quickly, it is difficult to control their populations. Animal shelters attempt to adopt out feral cats, especially kittens, but often are overwhelmed with sheer numbers and euthanasia is used. In rural areas of the US, excessive numbers of feral cats are often shot. The "trap-neuter-return" method has been used in many locations as an alternative means of managing the feral cat population.

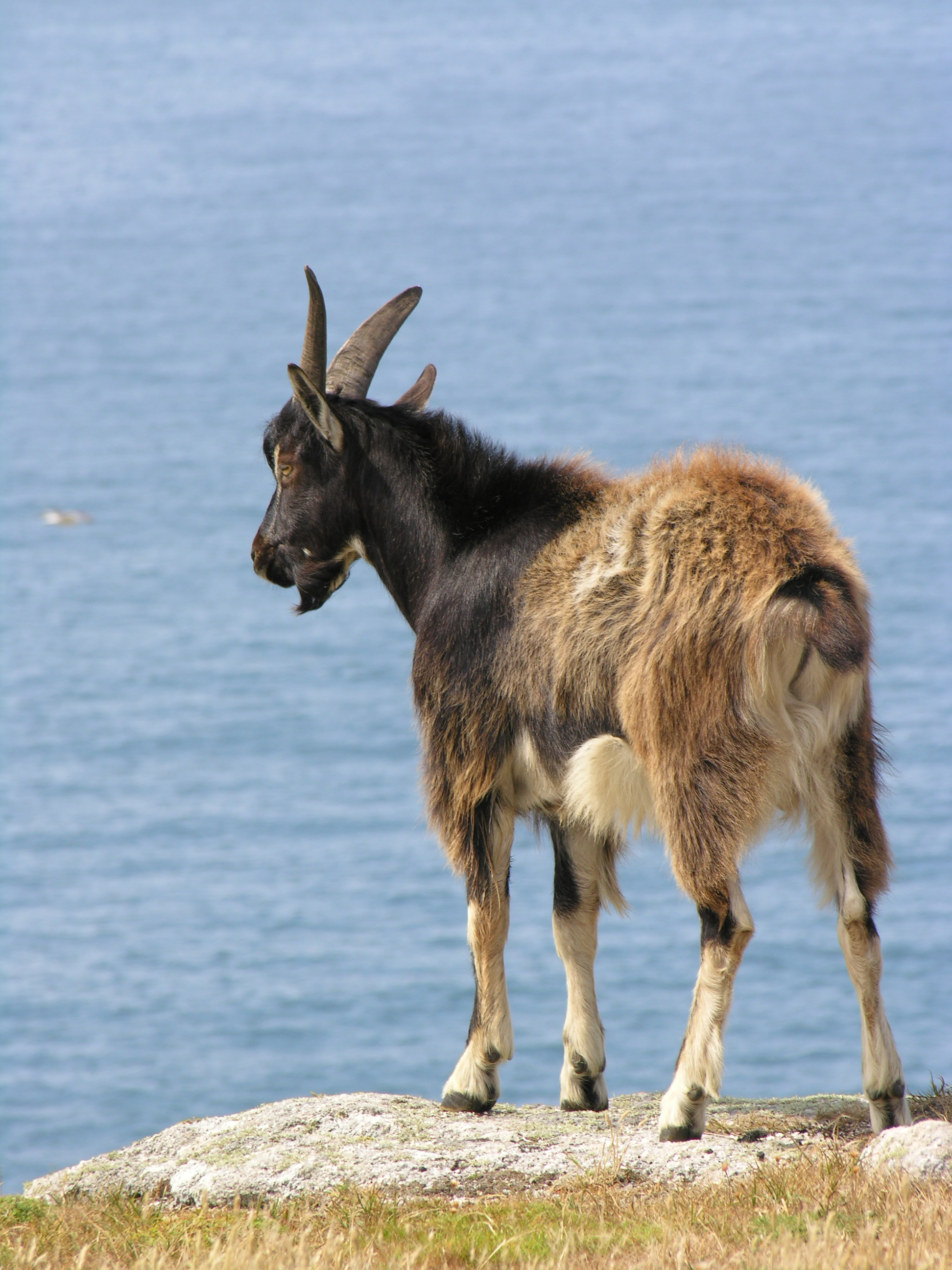
A feral goat in Cornwall

The goat is one of the oldest domesticated creatures, yet readily returns to a feral state. Sheep are close contemporaries and cohorts of goats in the history of domestication, but the domestic sheep is vulnerable to predation and injury, and thus rarely seen in a feral state. However, in places where there are few predators, they may thrive, for example in the case of the Soay sheep. Both goats and sheep were sometimes intentionally released and allowed to go feral on island waypoints frequented by mariners, to serve as a ready food source.

The dromedary camel, which has been domesticated for over 3,000 years, will also readily go feral. A substantial population of feral dromedaries, descended from pack animals that escaped in the 19th and early 20th centuries, thrives in the Australian interior today.

Water buffalo run rampant in Western and Northern Australia. The Australian government encourages the hunting of feral water buffalo because of their large numbers.

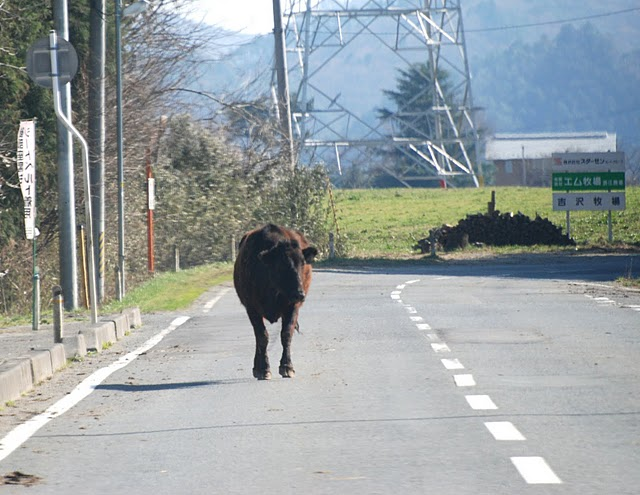
An escaped cow ambles down a street in Namie, Fukushima, a town evacuated following the 2011 Tōhoku earthquake and tsunami. In situations where humans leave an area, domesticated animals left behind have the opportunity to escape into the wild.

Cattle have been domesticated since the Neolithic era, but can survive on open range for months or years with little or no supervision. Their ancestors, the aurochs, were aggressive, similar to the modern Cape buffalo. Modern cattle, especially those raised on open range, are generally more docile, but when threatened can display aggression. Cattle, particularly those raised for beef, are often allowed to roam quite freely and have established long term independence in Australia, New Zealand and several Pacific Islands along with small populations of semi-feral animals roaming the southwestern United States and northern Mexico. Such cattle are variously called mavericks, scrubbers or cleanskins. Most free roaming cattle, however untamed, are generally too valuable not to be eventually rounded up and recovered in closely settled regions.

Horses and donkeys, domesticated about 5000 BCE, are feral in open grasslands worldwide. In Australia, they are known as Brumbies; in the American west, they are called mustangs. Other isolated feral populations exist, including the Chincoteague Pony and the Sable Island horse. They are often referred to as "wild horses", but this is a misnomer. There are truly "wild" horses that have never been domesticated, most notably Przewalski's horse. While the horse was originally indigenous to North America, the wild ancestor died out at the end of the last ice age. In both Australia and the Americas, modern "wild" horses descended from domesticated horses brought by European explorers and settlers that escaped, spread, and thrived. Australia hosts a feral donkey population, as do the Virgin Islands and the American southwest.

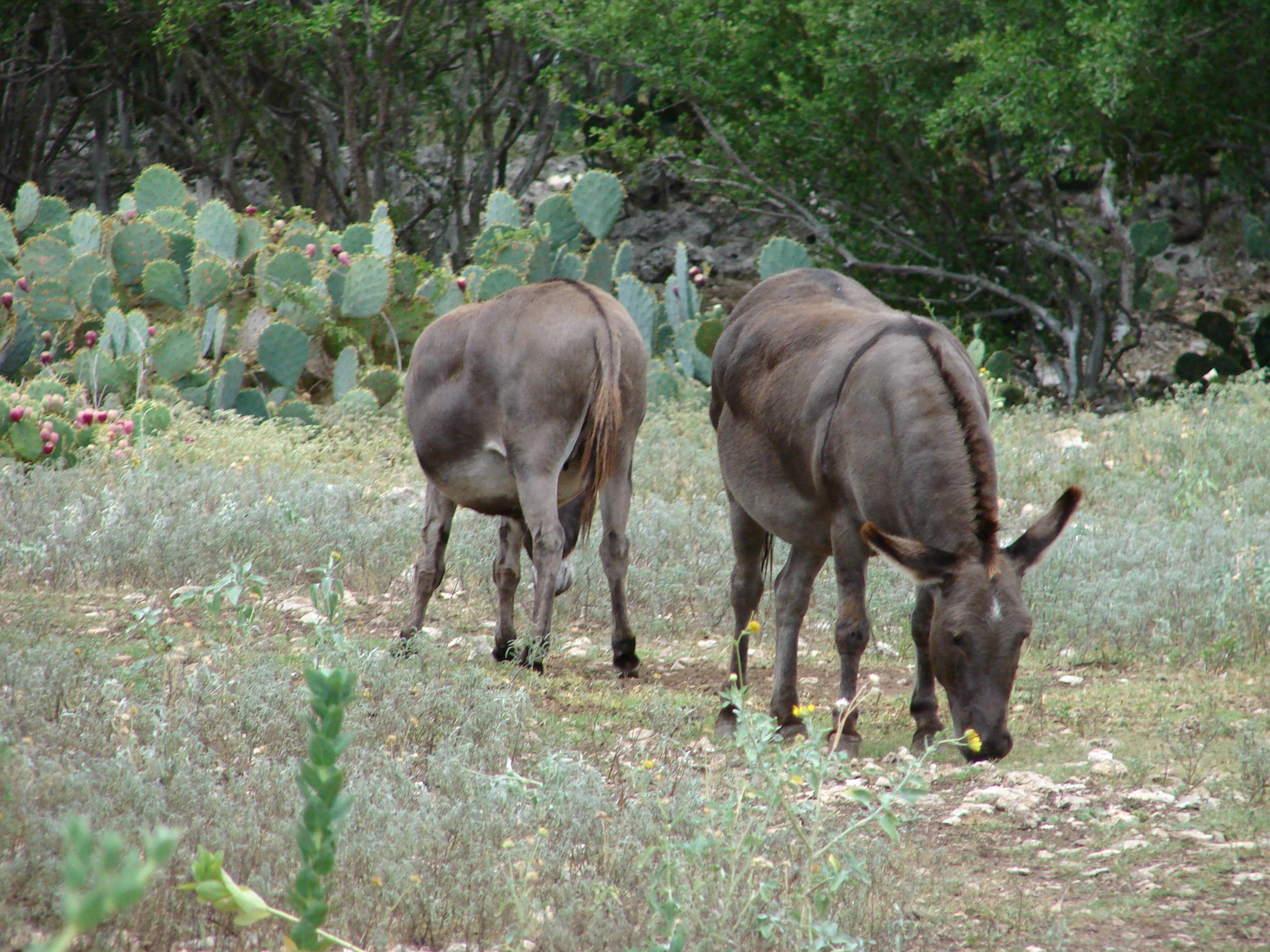
Feral donkeys

The pig has established feral populations worldwide, including in Australia, New Zealand, the United States, New Guinea and the Pacific Islands. Pigs were introduced to the Melanesian and Polynesian regions by humans from several thousand to 500 years ago, and to the Americas within the past 500 years. In Australia, domesticated pigs escaped in the 18th century, and now cover 40 percent of Australia, with a population estimated at 30 million. While pigs are thought to have been brought to New Zealand by the original Polynesian settlers, this population had become extinct by the time of European colonization, and all feral pigs in New Zealand today are descendants of European stock. Many European wild boar populations are also partially descended from escaped domestic pigs and are thus feral animals within the native range of the ancestral species.

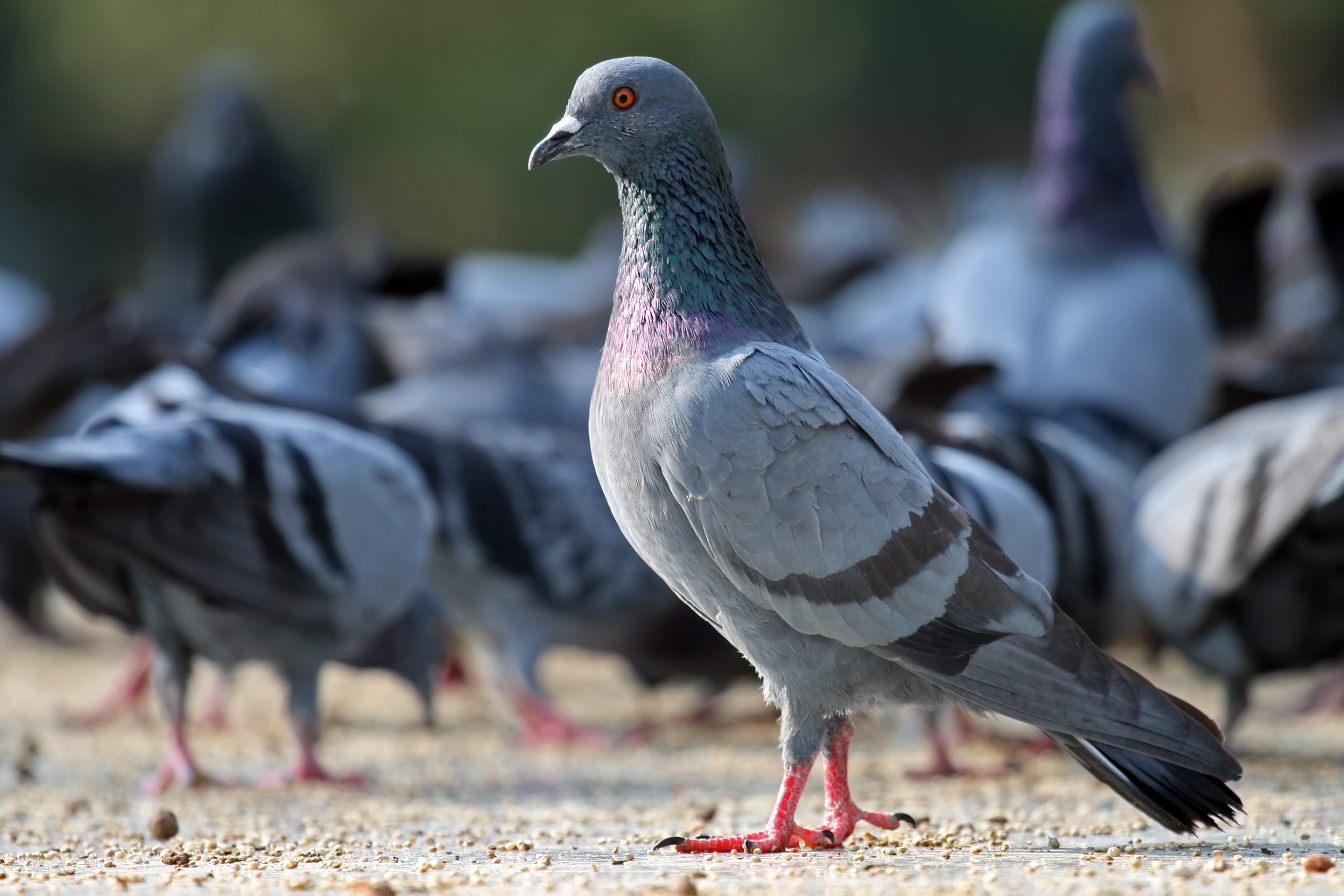
Feral pigeons in Bangalore, Karnataka, India

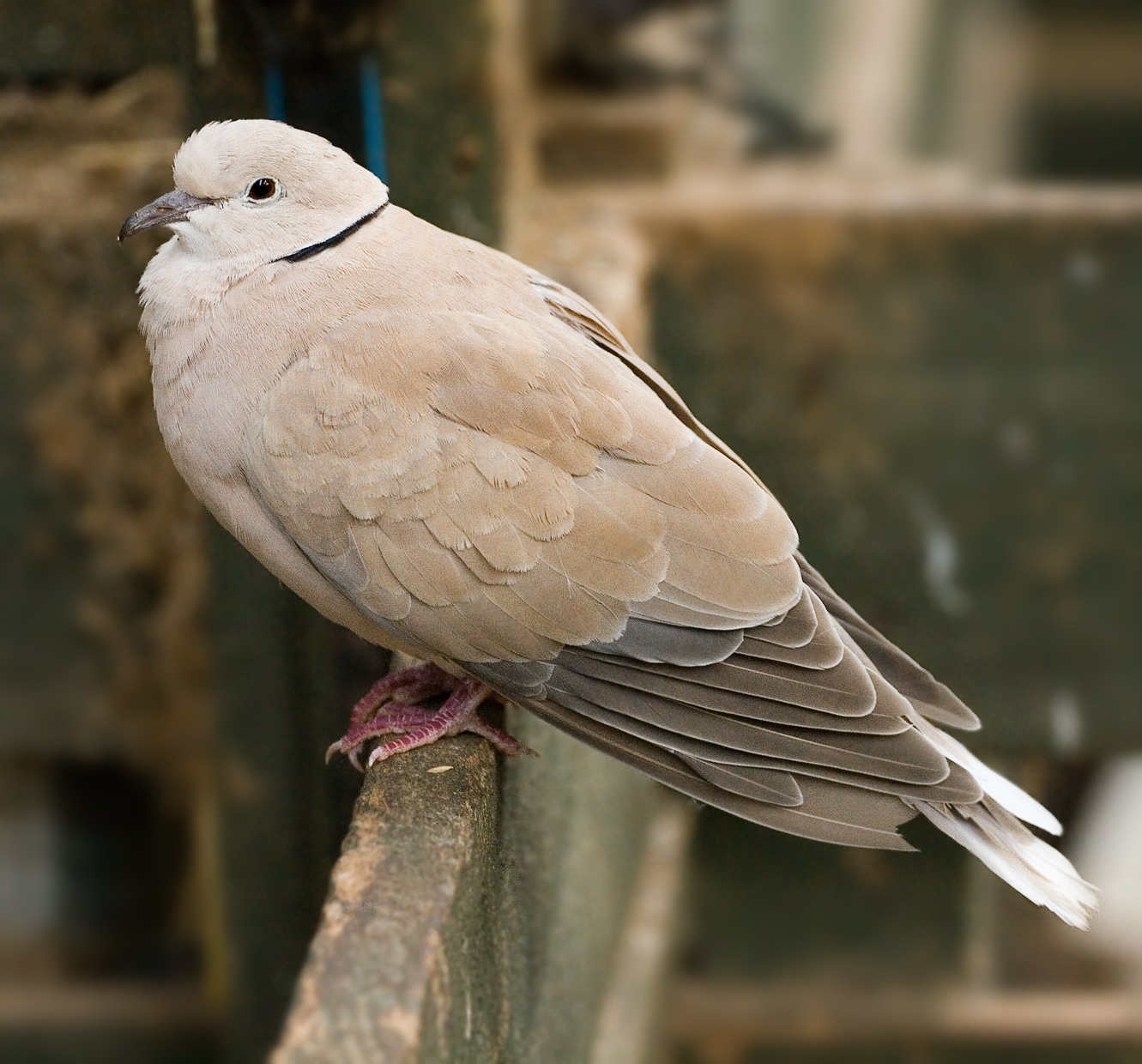
A feral Barbary dove in Tasmania, Australia. Also known as a ringneck dove or ring dove (Streptopelia risoria)

Rock doves were formerly kept for their meat or more commonly as racing animals and have established feral populations in cities worldwide.

Colonies of honey bees often escape into the wild from managed apiaries when they swarm; their behavior, however, is no different from their behavior in captivity, unless they breed with other feral honey bees of a different genetic stock, which may lead them to become more docile or more aggressive (see Africanized bees).

Large colonies of feral parrots are present in various parts of the world, with rose-ringed parakeets, monk parakeets and red-masked parakeets (the latter of which became the subject of the documentary film, The Wild Parrots of Telegraph Hill) being particularly successful outside of their native habitats and adapting well to suburban environments.

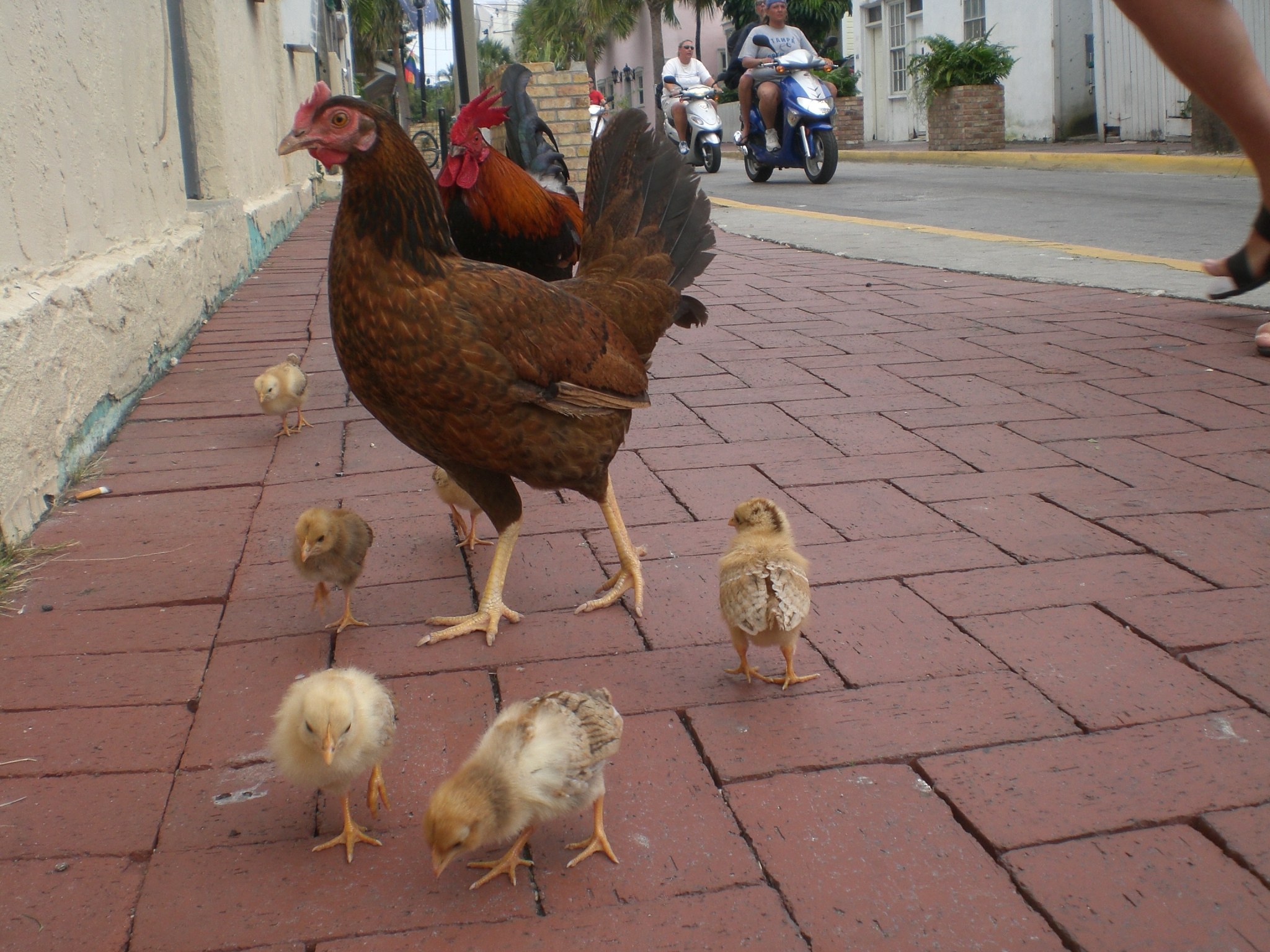
A family of feral chickens, Key West, Florida

Wild cocks are derived from domestic chickens (Gallus gallus domesticus) who have returned to the wild. Like the red junglefowl (the closest wild relative of domestic chickens), wild cocks will take flight and roost in tall trees and bushes in order to avoid predators at night. Wild cocks typically form social groups composed of a dominant cockerel, several hens, and subordinate cocks. Sometimes the dominant cockerel is designated by a fight between cocks.

== Effects of feralization ==
=== Ecological impact ===
A feral population can have a significant impact on an ecosystem by predation on vulnerable plants or animals, or by competition with indigenous species. Feral plants and animals constitute a significant share of invasive species, and can be a threat to endangered species. However, they may also replace species lost from an ecosystem on initial human arrival to an area, or increase the biodiversity of a human-altered area by being able to survive in it in ways local species cannot. Feral zebu have been reintroduced in Kuno Wildlife Sanctuary in order to replace their ancestor, the aurochs.

=== Genetic pollution ===
Animals of domestic origin sometimes can produce fertile hybrids with native, wild animals which leads to genetic pollution (not a clear term itself) in the naturally evolved wild gene pools, many times threatening rare species with extinction. Cases include the mallard duck, wild boar, the rock dove or pigeon, the red junglefowl (Gallus gallus) (ancestor of all chickens), European wildcat, carp, and more recently salmon. Other examples of genetic swamping lie in the breeding history of dingoes. Dingoes are wild true dogs that will interbreed with dogs of other origins, thus leading to the proliferation of dingo hybrids and the possibility of the extinction of pure wild dingoes. Researches in Scotland have remarked on a similar phenomenon of the genetic mixing of feral domestic cats and their wild counterparts.

=== Economic harm ===
Feral animals compete with domestic livestock, and may degrade fences, water sources, and vegetation (by overgrazing or introducing seeds of invasive plants). Although hotly disputed, American Wild Horse Conservation cites as an example the competition between feral horses and cattle in the western United States. Another example is of goats competing with cattle in Australia, or goats that degrade trees and vegetation in environmentally-stressed regions of Africa. Accidental crossbreeding by feral animals may result in harm to breeding programs of pedigreed animals; their presence may also excite domestic animals and push them to escape. Feral populations can also pass on transmissible infections to domestic herds. Loss to farmers by aggressive feral dog population is common in India.

=== Economic benefits ===
Many feral animals can sometimes be captured at little cost and thus constitute a significant resource. Throughout most of Polynesia and Melanesia feral pigs constitute the primary sources of animal protein. Prior to the Wild and Free-Roaming Horses and Burros Act of 1971, American mustangs were routinely captured and sold for horsemeat. In Australia, feral goats, pigs, horses, and dromedaries are harvested for the export for their meat trade. At certain times, animals were sometimes deliberately left to go feral, typically on islands, in order to be later recovered for profit or food use for travellers (particularly sailors) at the end of a few years.

=== Scientific value ===
Populations of feral animals present good sources for studies of population dynamics, and especially of ecology and behavior (ethology) in a wide state of species known mainly in a domestic state. Such observations can provide useful information for the stock breeders or other owners of the domesticated conspecifics (i.e. animals of the same species).

=== Cultural or historic value ===
American mustangs have been protected since 1971 in part due to their romance and connection to the history of the American West. A similar situation is that of the Danube Delta horse from the Letea Forest in the Danube Delta. The Romanian government is considering the protection of the feral horses and transforming them into a tourist attraction, after it first approved the killing of the entire population. Due to the intervention of numerous organizations and widespread popular disapproval of the Romanians the horses have been saved, but still have an uncertain fate as their legal status is unclear and local people continue to claim the right to use the horses in their own interest.

== See also ==
- Ecology of fear
- Estray
- Feral child
- Invasive species
- Overpopulation in domestic animals
- Wild animal suffering
