= Letea (disambiguation) =

Letea can mean:

== Places ==
- Letea Forest, the oldest natural reservation in Romania
- Letea Veche, a commune in Bacău County, Romania
- Letea, Tulcea, a village in Tulcea County, Romania

== Company ==
- Letea, a company producing paper for newspapers in Romania
