= Nokota horse =

American breed of horse

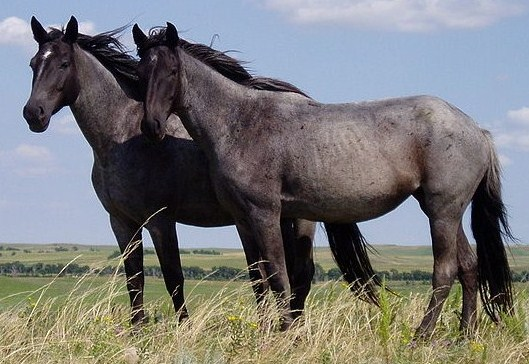
- Two young horses
- Country of origin: United States

Traits
- Distinguishing features: Angular frame, often blue roan, often exhibits an ambling gait

Breed standards
- Nokota Horse Registry

The Nokota horse is a feral and semi-feral horse breed located in the badlands of southwestern North Dakota in the United States. The breed developed in the 19th century from foundation stock consisting of ranch-bred horses produced from the horses of local Native Americans mixed with Spanish horses, Thoroughbreds, harness horses and related breeds. The Nokota was almost wiped out during the early 20th century when ranchers, in cooperation with state and federal agencies, worked together to reduce competition for livestock grazing. However, when Theodore Roosevelt National Park was created in the 1940s, a few bands were inadvertently trapped inside, and thus were preserved.

In 1986, the park sold off many horses, including herd stallions, and released several stallions with outside bloodlines into the herds. At this point, brothers Leo and Frank Kuntz began purchasing the horses with the aim of preserving the breed, and founded the Nokota Horse Conservancy in 1999, later beginning a breed registry through the same organization. Later, a second, short-lived, registry was begun by another organization in Minnesota. In 2009, the North Dakota Badlands Horse Registry was created, which registers the slightly different type of horses which have been removed from the park in recent years. Today, the park conducts regular thinning of the herd to keep numbers between 70 and 110, and the excess horses are sold off.

The Nokota horse has an angular frame, is commonly blue roan in color, and often exhibits an ambling gait called the "Indian shuffle". The breed is generally separated into two sections—the traditional and the ranch type—which differ slightly in conformation and height. They are used in many events, including endurance riding, western riding and English disciplines.

== Breed characteristics ==
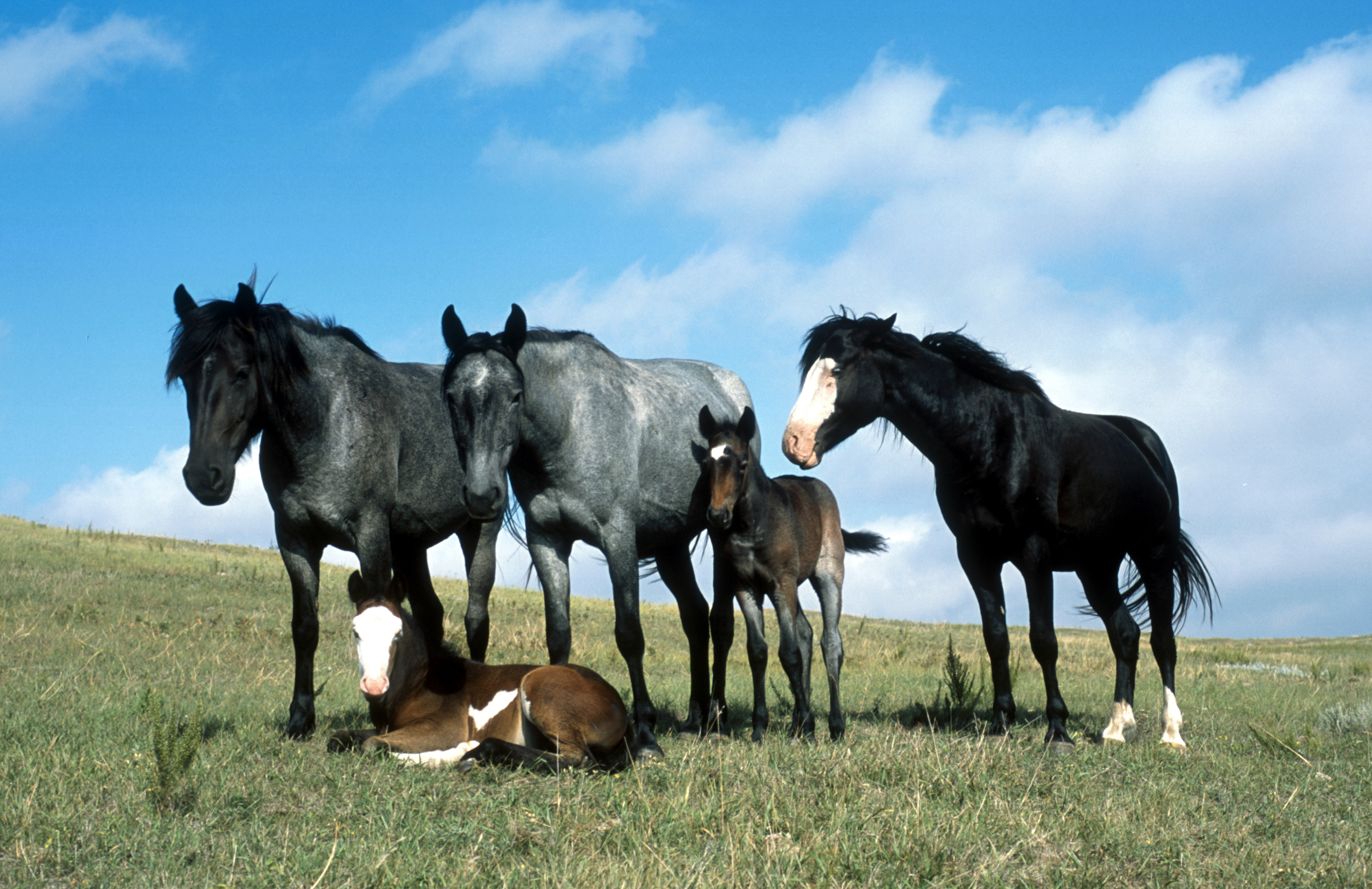
A small band of Nokota horses, showing several common colors of the breed

The Nokota horse has an angular frame with prominent withers, a sloped croup, and a low set tail. Members of the breed are often blue roan, although black and gray are also common. Less common colors include red roan, bay, chestnut, dun, grullo and palomino. Pinto patterns such as overo and sabino occur occasionally.

There are two general types of the Nokota horse. The first is the traditional Nokota, known by the registry as the National Park Traditional. They tend to be smaller, more refined, and closer in type to the Colonial Spanish horse, and generally stand between 14 and 14.3 hands (56 and 59 inches, 142 and 150 cm) high. The second type is known as the ranch-type or National Park Ranch, more closely resemble early "foundation type" Quarter Horses, and generally stand from 14.2 to 17 hands (58 to 68 inches, 147 to 173 cm). Members of the breed often exhibit an ambling gait, once known as the "Indian shuffle." Nokota horses are described as versatile and intelligent. Members of the breed have been used in endurance racing and western riding.

Sources vary on the etymology of the breed's name, with one source stating that the Nokota derives its name from the Nakota people who inhabited North and South Dakota, while another says that the name was a combination of North Dakota created by the Kuntz brothers.

== History ==
The Nokota horse developed in the southwestern corner of North Dakota, in the Little Missouri River Badlands. Feral horses were first encountered by ranchers in the 19th century, and horses from domestic herds mingled with the feral herds. Ranchers often crossbred local Indian ponies, Spanish horses from the southwest, and various draft, harness, Thoroughbred and stock horses to make hardy, useful ranch horses. Theodore Roosevelt, who ranched in the Little Missouri area between 1883 and 1886, wrote:

In a great many —indeed in most— localities there are wild horses to be found, which, although invariably of domestic descent, being either themselves runaways from some ranch or Indian outfit, or else claiming such for their sires and dams, yet are quite as wild as the antelope on whose domain they have intruded.

In 1884, the HT Ranch, located near Medora, North Dakota, bought 60 mares from a herd of 250 Native American-bred horses originally confiscated from the Lakota leader Sitting Bull and sold at Fort Buford, North Dakota in 1881. Some of these mares were bred to a Thoroughbred racing stallion, also owned by the HT Ranch. Ranch owner A.C. Huidekoper also bred Indian-bred mares with imported Percheron stallions to make offspring more marketable to draft horse buyers, which accounts for the high degree of Percheron blood in the Nokota breed today.

By the early 20th century, the feral horse herds became the target of local ranchers looking to limit grazing competition for their livestock. Many horses were rounded up, and either used as ranch horses, sold for slaughter, or shot. From the 1930s through the 1950s, federal and state agencies worked with ranchers to remove horses from western North Dakota. However, when Theodore Roosevelt National Park was established in the 1940s, during construction, a few bands of horses were accidentally enclosed within the Park fence, and by 1960 these bands were the last remaining feral horses in North Dakota. Nonetheless, the park sought to eliminate these horses. The National Park Service was declared exempt from the Wild and Free-Roaming Horses and Burros Act of 1971 that covered free-roaming horses and burros on other federal lands. This allowed them to view the herds as nuisances and deal with them as such, including sending many to slaughter.

In the late 1970s, growing public opposition to the removal of feral horses prompted changes to management strategy, and today the herds within the Theodore Roosevelt National Park are managed for historical demonstration. However, in 1986 the park added outside bloodlines with the aim of modifying the appearance of the Nokota. Park management felt that the horses created with the outside bloodlines would sell better at subsequent auctions. The dominant herd stallions were removed and replaced with two feral stallions from Bureau of Land Management herds; a Shire-Paint cross stallion; an American Quarter Horse stallion; and an Arabian stallion. At the same time that the stallion replacements took place, many horses from the park were rounded up and sold. At the 1986 auction, concerned about the welfare of the Nokota horse, Leo and Frank Kuntz purchased 54 horses, including the dominant stallion, a blue roan. This was in addition to smaller numbers of horses purchased in 1981, 1991 and 1997. After researching the history of the breed, the Kuntz brothers stated that they had found evidence that the horses in the park were probably related to the remaining horses from the band of 250 Sitting Bull horses, which had been range-bred by the Marquis de Morès, who founded the town of Medora. However, the short-lived Nokota Horse Association stated that there was no evidence for this claim.

=== 1990s to today ===
By 1993, the Kuntz brothers had a herd of 150 horses, including those purchased from the park as well as the descendants. They used the horses mainly for ranching and endurance races. In 1993, the Nokota was declared the Honorary State Equine of the state of North Dakota. In 1994, researchers conducted a study of the horses in the park and on the Kuntz ranch, and discovered that none of the horses in the park, and only about 20 on the ranch, had characteristics consistent with the Colonial Spanish horse. Since then, the horses on the Kuntz ranch have been bred to maintain and improve their Spanish characteristics. In 1999, the Kuntz brothers founded the Nokota Horse Conservancy to protect and conserve the Nokota horse. The Nokota Horse Conservancy tracks around 1,000 living and dead horses, and Nokota horses can be found throughout the United States.

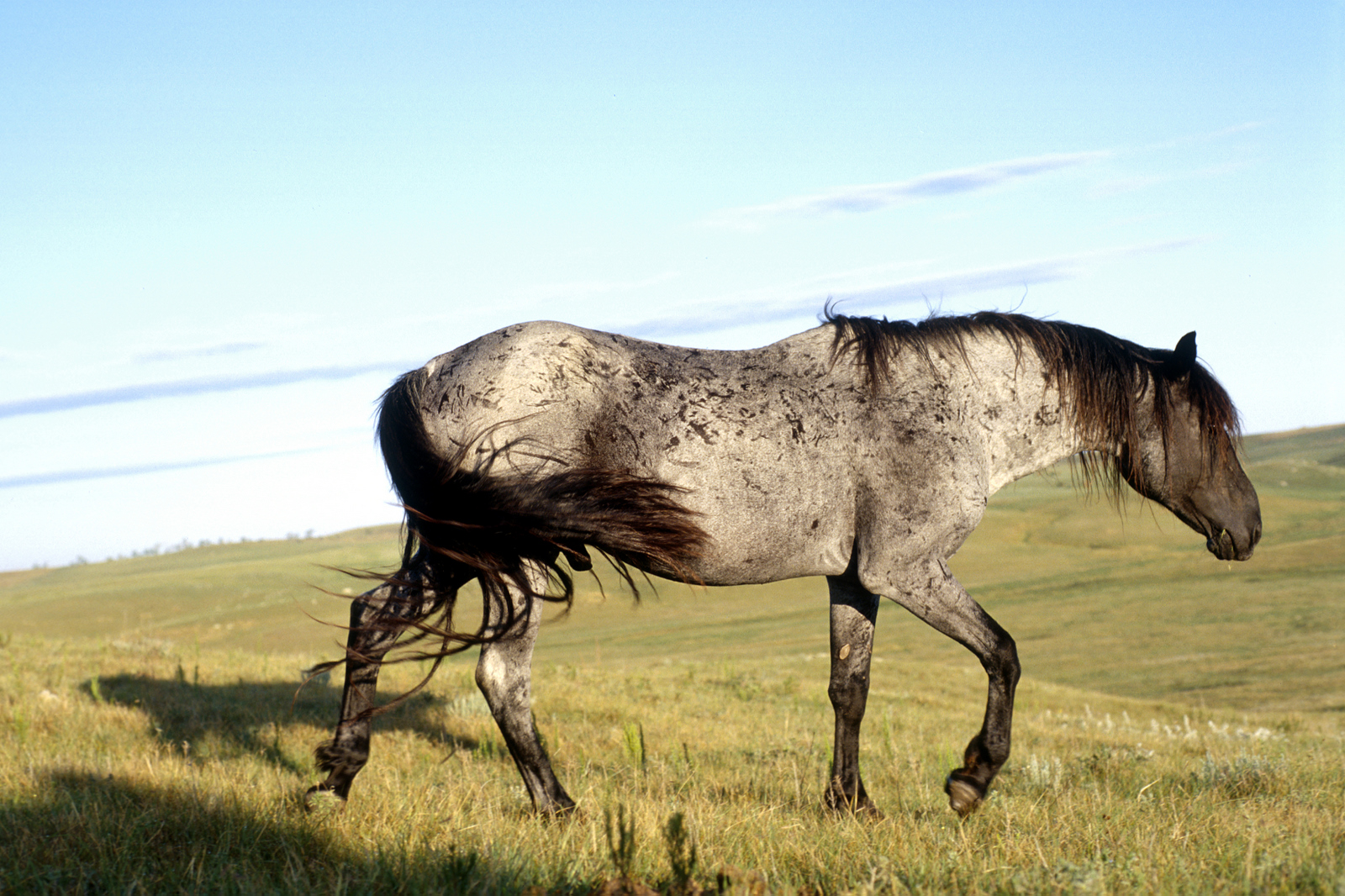
A blue roan stallion

Theodore Roosevelt National Park has continued thinning the herd, with several roundups conducted throughout the 1990s and 2000s. In 2000, the last horses to be considered of "traditional" Nokota type were removed from the wild, with some being purchased by supporters of the Nokota Horse Conservancy. As of 2008, the National Park Service maintained a herd of 70 to 110 horses. In 2006, the breed was chosen to be the beneficiary of Breyer Animal Creations' annual Benefit Horse Campaign; a Breyer model was created, manufactured, and marketed in 2007, with a portion of the proceeds going to the Nokota Horse Conservancy. As of 2006, the Kuntz family owned approximately 500 Nokota horses, with the Nokota Horse Conservancy owning an additional 40. At that point, there were less than 1,000 living Nokotas in the world.

The Nokota Horse Registry is the breed registry organized by the Nokota Horse Conservancy. There was briefly a second registry: a Minnesota-based organization called the Nokota Horse Association. In October 2009, the two registries disputed which had the right to the Nokota breed name, with the Association claiming that they own the legal trademark to the name. The Registry sued, contending that they created the name and had a longer history with the breed. A US District Court ordered that the Association cease registering horses until the matter was settled, and the association disappeared from public view soon after. In the fall of 2009, another organization, the North Dakota Badlands Horse Registry, was created. This organization registers horses that have been removed from the park in recent years, stating that these horses are not accepted by the Nokota Horse Registry. As of March 2011, approximately 40 horses had been registered. These horses tend to be of a slightly different type than the horses registered by the Nokota Horse Registry due to the additional blood from different breeds released into the park.
