= Giara horse =

Breed of horse

Giara horse Cavallino della Giara Cuaddeddu de sa Jara
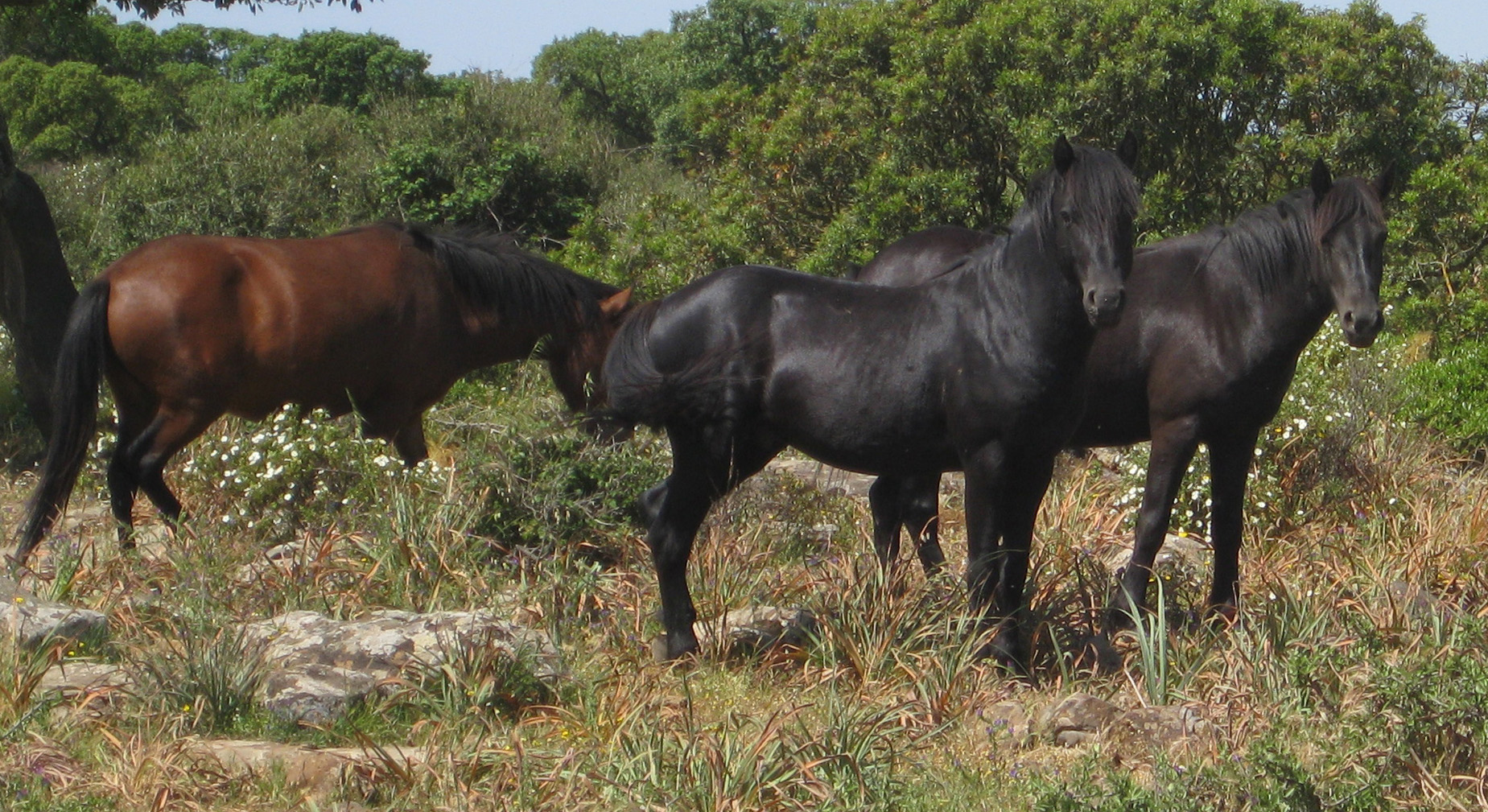
- Other names: Giara pony Horse of the Giara
- Country of origin: Italy, native to island of Sardinia

Breed standards
- Associazione Italiana Allevatori

The Giara horse (Sardinian: Cuaddeddu de sa Jara, Italian: Cavallino della Giara) is a horse breed native to the island of Sardinia. It is one of the fifteen indigenous horse "breeds of limited distribution" recognised by the AIA, the Italian breeders' association. While of small size due to the hostile environment in which it lives, and sometimes called a "pony," it is considered a true horse.

== Etymology ==
In older literature, the name achetta (for a mare, achettu for a stallion) is also sometimes encountered. It is no longer used because the Sardinian term it is derived from, acheta (variants: achetu, akkètta, akkéttu) describes any small to medium sized horse. The Sardinian term acheta itself is a diminutive based on the root ácha and entered the language via Catalan/Algherese (h)aca "small horse", itself from Spanish haca, jaca. The word jaca again is derived from Old Spanish haca, itself from Old French haque, which in turn is ultimately derived from the English place-name Hackney, a place famous for its horses.

The term Giara (Sardinian: Jara, variants: ghiaia, yára, ǧár(r)a) literally means "plateau, tableland", meaning the Giara di Gesturi, so literally "plateau horse".

== Characteristics ==
The Giara was developed in an area of south-central Sardinia noted for a stony basaltic plateau at about 500 metres (1,600 ft) above sea level with steep terrain. Due to this harsh environment, the horse is small, averaging between 11.1 to 13.1 hands (45 to 53 inches, 114 to 135 cm), but hardy and able to acclimate to unfavorable conditions. It has a horse phenotype rather than that of a pony. Most are bay, chestnut or black. They have an abundant forelock and mane. Their head is relatively large with a wide jaw, the neck is not very long, but described as "strong." The breed tends to be a bit straight in the shoulder with relatively low withers, a somewhat long back and loin, and the croup is sloped with a low-set tail. They have good bone, characterized by an average cannon circumference of 14 centimetres (5.5 in), large joints and hooves that are small but strong. The Giara has sure-footed gaits and a temperament that is spirited.

== Habitat and population ==
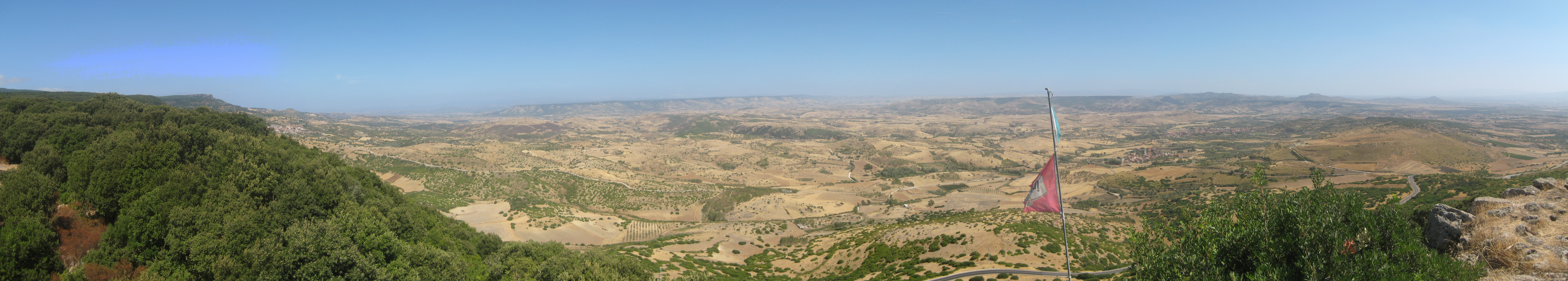
View of the Giara de Gesturi from the Inus nuraghe

The total population is estimated at around 60 to 80 individuals.

Present throughout Sardinia until Medieval times, the wild population now lives only in a restricted area of Southern Sardinia, on the large basalt plateau La Giara di Gesturi, at 500–600 meters above sea level. The Giara Plateau has sides that are steep cliffs, and the difficulty of access and the isolated location have protected the wild stock in recent centuries. Used in agriculture until the 1950s, the Giara horse was largely supplanted by machinery in the 1960s and many were slaughtered.

In 1971, considering the breed to be at risk of extinction, the Istituto di Incremento Ippico della Sardegna (Sardinian horse-breeding institution) of Ozieri established a breeding centre at Foresta Burgos, in central northern Sardinia. A small number of individuals were reintroduced elsewhere (Regional Park of Monte Arci and the Regional Park of Capo Caccia, in Alghero).

Today, some are used for farming and riding. Recently the Istituto di Incremento Ippico has crossed Giara horses with Arabian horses to create the Giarab, a new breed suited to equestrian sports.
