= Lavradeiro =

Brazilian breed of horse

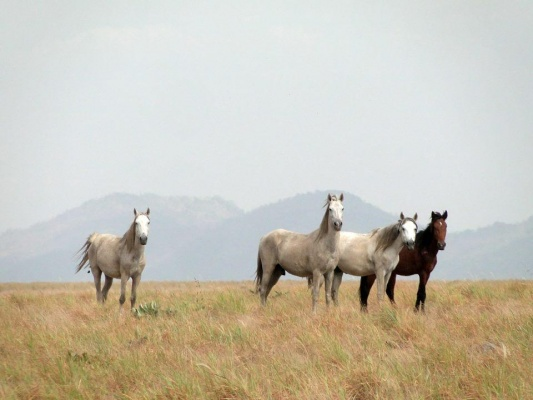
- In Amajari, in northern Roraima
- Conservation status: FAO (2007): endangered/maintained; DAD-IS (2023): unknown
- Other names: Wild Horse of Roraima
- Country of origin: Brazil
- Distribution: Roraima

Traits
- Weight: Male: 285 kg; Female: 275 kg
- Height: Male: 145 cm; Female: 135 cm
- Colour: chestnut; bay; roan; dapple grey; rose grey

The Lavradeiro or Wild Horse of Roraima is a Brazilian breed or population of feral horses of Colonial Spanish type in the state of Roraima, in northern Brazil. The name derives from the lavrado or savannah terrain in that region.

A conservation herd was established in Amajari by the Empresa Brasileira de Pesquisa Agropecuária, the national organisation for agricultural research, in about 1991.

== History ==
The Lavradeiro is of Criollo or Colonial Spanish type, descending from Iberian horses brought to the Americas by the conquistadores Horses of this type were brought into Roraima during the period of Portuguese colonisation in the eighteenth century.

The horses were managed extensively on the unfenced savannah or lavrado of eastern Roraima – an area of approximately 40000 sq km, or about a sixth of the area of the state. A substantial feral population established itself, and the horses became hardy and well-adapted to the difficult climate and poor grazing of the area. Until about 1980 this population numbered some 1000 head, but by the end of the decade numbers had fallen to no more than 200, largely as a result of hunting.

A conservation herd of some fifty horses was established in about 1991 at the Fazenda Resolução in Amajari by the Empresa Brasileira de Pesquisa Agropecuária, the national organisation for agricultural research. The feral population is at risk of extinction, threatened principally by hunting and by uncontrolled cross-breeding with horses of other breeds.

Its conservation status was listed by the Food and Agriculture Organization of the United Nations in 2007 as 'endangered/maintained'; in 2023 it was listed as 'unknown'. The only population data reported to DAD-IS is for 1992, when there were 1200 of the horses, including 850 breeding mares and 100 stallions; total numbers in 2010 are variously reported to have been either 1260–1680 or fewer than 200. Germplasm is conserved under the supervision of Embrapa in Roraima.

== Characteristics ==
Average height at the withers is about 1.40 m; it is about 1.37 m (13.2 h) for mares and approximately 1.41 m (14.0 h) for males. Average thoracic circumference is 1.63–1.66 m (64–65 in).

The coat is generally bay, chestnut, iron grey or roan. The back is short, the croup sloping. The mane and tail are thick, the ears are small.

The horses show some resistance to equine infectious anaemia and are well adapted to their biotope. Their blood proteins and random amplification of polymorphic DNA markers have been studied.
