= Cape Toi =

Cape in Kushima, Miyazaki, Japan

Cape Toi 都井岬 (Toi-misaki)
- Cape
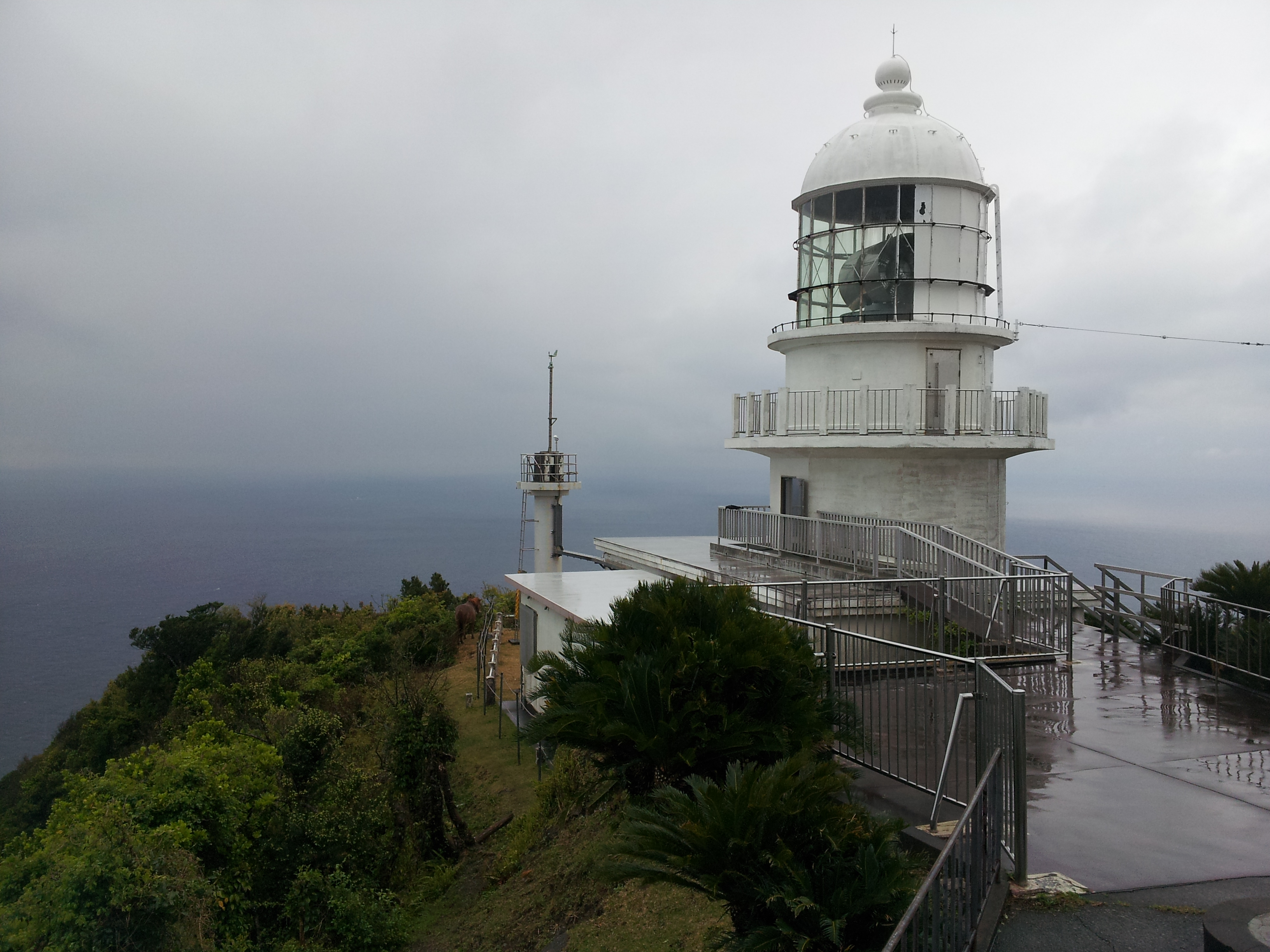

- Coordinates: 31°21′52″N 131°20′51″E
- Location: Kushima, Miyazaki, Japan
- Offshore water bodies: Pacific Ocean

Cape Toi (都井岬, Toi-misaki?) is a cape located in Kushima, Miyazaki, Japan, on the Nichinan coast bordering the Pacific Ocean. The cape is renowned for its beauty and for the wild horses that roam freely. A strip of land in the heart of Cape Toi includes Mount Ōgi and Komatsugaoka, which are classified as a national natural monument by the Agency for Cultural Affairs.

== Facilities ==
The Cape Toimisaki Tourist Exchange Hall Pakalapaka is a rest facility that also exhibits and introduces Misaki Uma and Cape Toi.

Cape Toi Lighthouse, located in the eastern part of the cape, is located 255m above sea level, 15m high, and has a light distance of 37 nautical miles. First lighted in 1929, it is a visiting lighthouse that is open to the public. It has also been selected as one of Japan's top 50 lighthouses. Those who stand at the lighthouse can enjoy a 270-degree view of the Pacific Ocean.

Cape Toimisaki Kanko Hotel was located in Cape Toi and it closed on March 1, 2010.
