= Giara di Gesturi =

Basaltic plateau on the island of Sardinia, Italy

Coordinates: 39.76°N 8.95°E

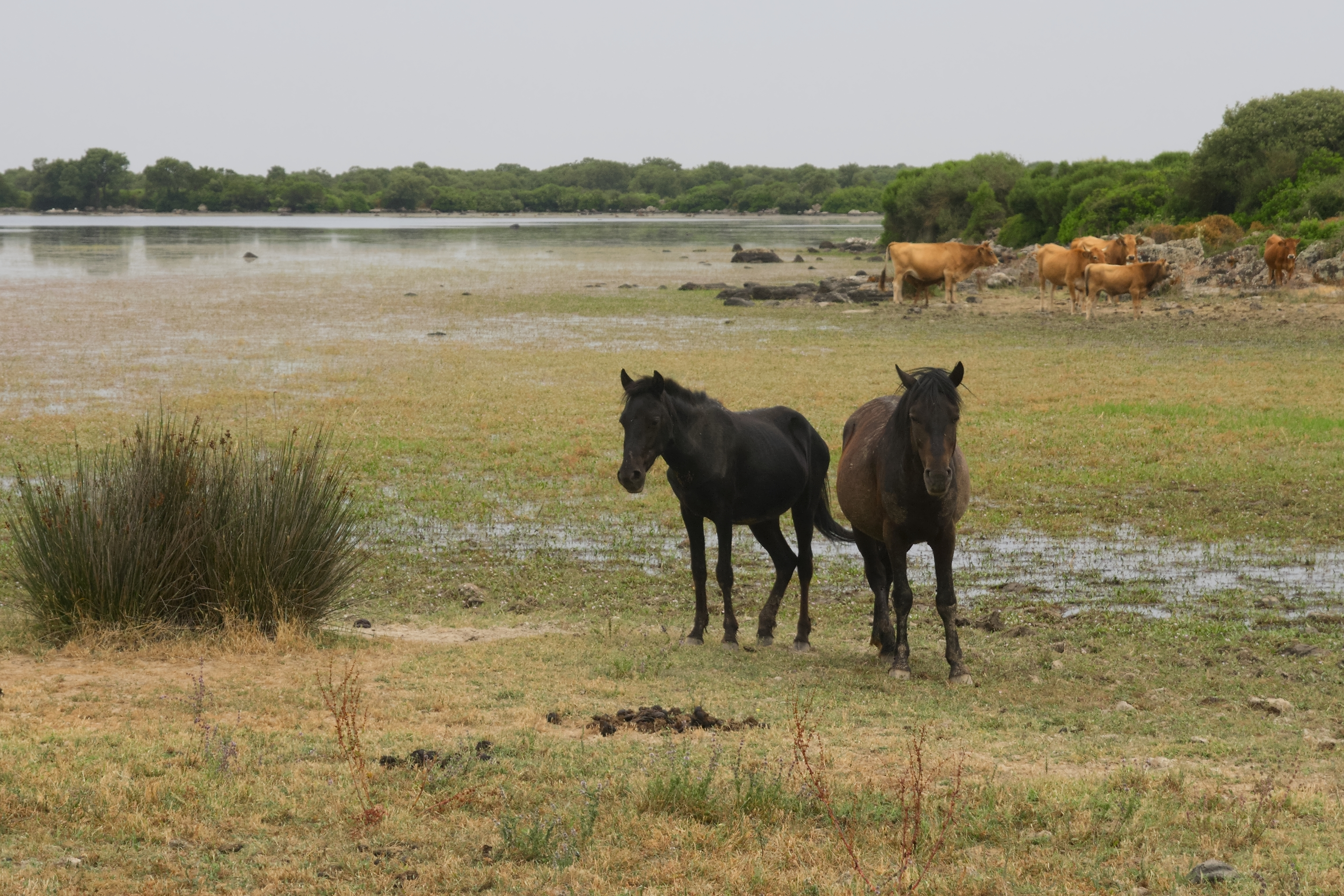
Wild horses on the Giara plateau

The Giara di Gesturi, Sardinian: Sa Jara Manna, is a high, steep-sided basaltic plateau which extends for about 42 km^{2} (16 sq mi) in the districts (comuni) of Gesturi, Tuili and Setzu in the province of Medio Campidano, and Genoni in the province of Oristano, in the southern central part of the island of Sardinia, Italy.

The plateau was formed some 2.7 million years ago when lava from the cones of Zepparedda (609 m (1,998 ft)) and Zeppara Manna (580 m (1,900 ft)) covered older sedimentary rock. The average height of the plateau is approximately 550 m (1,800 ft); it is accessible in only a few places, known as scalas ("stairs, ladders"). Along the perimeter of the plateau are the remains of 23 Nuraghi; the Nuraghic complex of Su Nuraxi di Barumini is a few kilometres to the south. Monte Arci, another basaltic geological formation, is located to the west of the Giara di Gesturi.

The surface of the Giara di Gesturi has a number of shallow depressions, Sardinian: paulis, some of which are deep enough to hold water year round; the largest of these is the Pauli Maiori (not to be confused with the Ramsar-designated Stagno di Pauli Maiori near Oristano). The soil of the plateau is shallow, rarely exceeding 50 cm (20 in) in depth. The Giara di Gesturi is home to over 350 plant species, notably the Cork oak, and to the majority of the surviving population of the Giara Horse.

The whole of the Giara di Gesturi lies within an area which was included in the Regional Plan of Parks and Nature Reserves approved by Regional Law no. 31 of 1989 (Parco Regionale della Giara, which has a total area of 120 km^{2} (46 sq mi)), but the Park was not subsequently designated.
