= Monte Arci =

Isolated massif in Sardinia, Italy

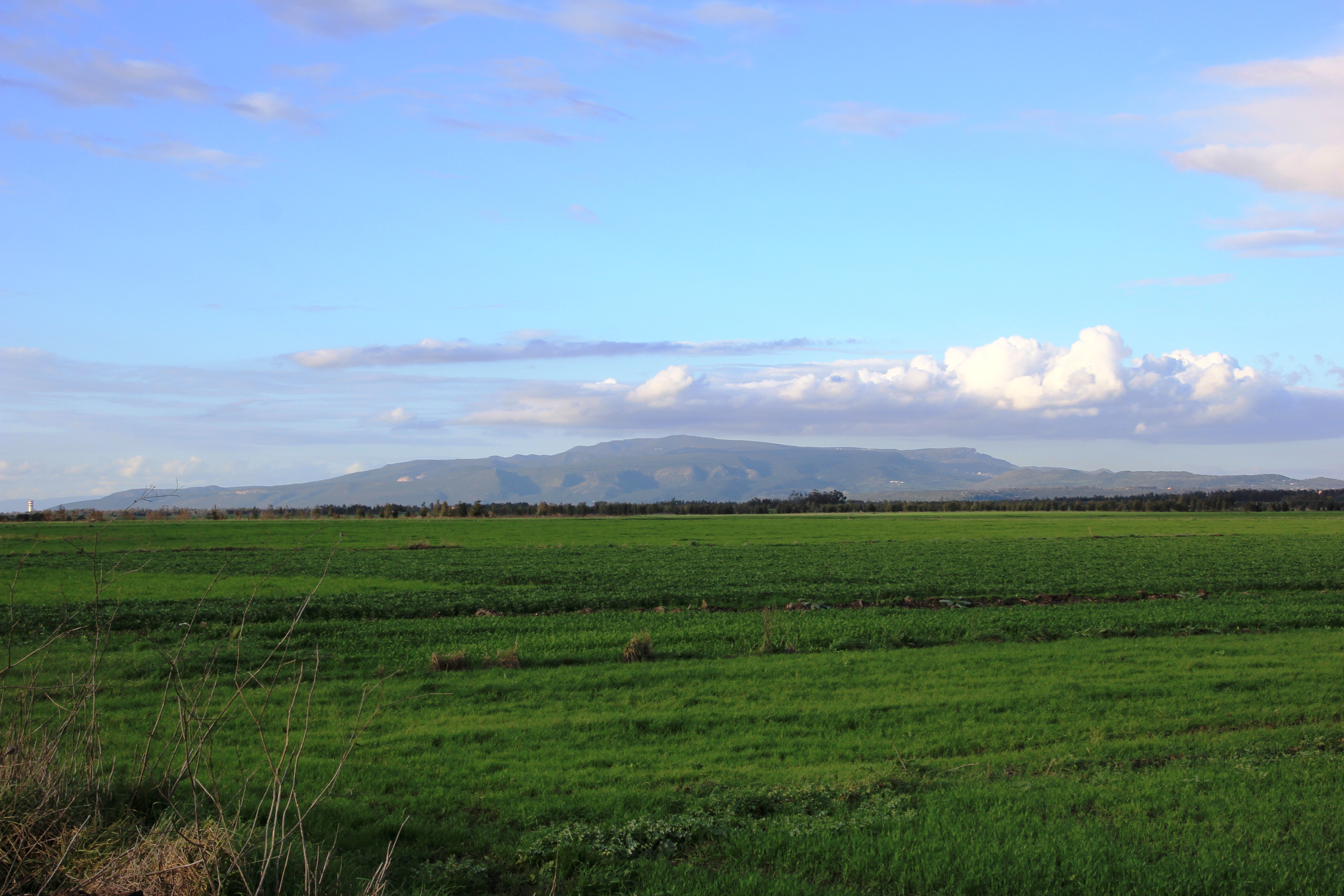

Highest point
- Elevation: 812 m (2,664 ft)
- Coordinates: 39°46′40″N 8°44′42″E

Geography
- Location within Italy
- Location: province of Oristano, Sardinia, Italy

The Monte Arci is an isolated massif in the Uras plain in Campidano, south-western Sardinia, Italy. It is composed by three volcanic basalt towers, the highest one reaching an elevation of 812 m. The inner part of the massif is composed of trachyte. Monte Arci is located just west of the Giara di Gesturi, a basaltic plateau. Monte Arci had a relevant historical role in Sardinia due to the abundant presence of obsidian, which was used since prehistoric times for weapons and tools, and was later traded outside the island. There are also quarries of pearlite.

== Archaeological significance ==
Monte Arci is renowned for its importance as one of the primary sources of obsidian in the western Mediterranean. Beginning in the Neolithic period (about 6,000–3,000 BCE), the distinctive volcanic glass from this region was extensively exploited and widely traded throughout the Mediterranean basin.

Research has identified five major chemical types of obsidian in the Monte Arci complex through comprehensive field surveys and chemical characterisation. Type SA occurs primarily at Conca Cannas, where large nodules form within a soft perlitic matrix at the southwestern foot of Monte Arci; this variety is typically glassy, black and often translucent. Types SB1 and SB2 are found in smaller quantities at sites such as Bruncu Perda Crobina, Seddai and Cuccuru Is Abis on the western flanks of the volcanic complex; these types comprise smaller nodules encased within harder volcanic matrices. Types SC1 and SC2 are present at higher elevations on the eastern side, particularly around Perdas Urias; they are distinguished by a characteristic chemical signature.

Analysis of more than 600 obsidian artefacts from roughly 50 archaeological sites across Sardinia, Corsica and northern Italy—using electron microprobe analysis and inductively coupled plasma mass spectrometry (ICP-MS)—has demonstrated that Monte Arci was the predominant source of obsidian for stone tool production across the western Mediterranean. Monte Arci obsidian has been identified at sites in southern France, peninsular Italy, Sicily, Malta and North Africa.

The application of minimally destructive provenance techniques has revealed both geographic and chronological variation in the exploitation of Monte Arci sources. These findings have deepened our understanding of prehistoric exchange networks, trade routes and cultural interactions throughout the western Mediterranean basin.
