= Danube Delta horse =

Population of feral horses

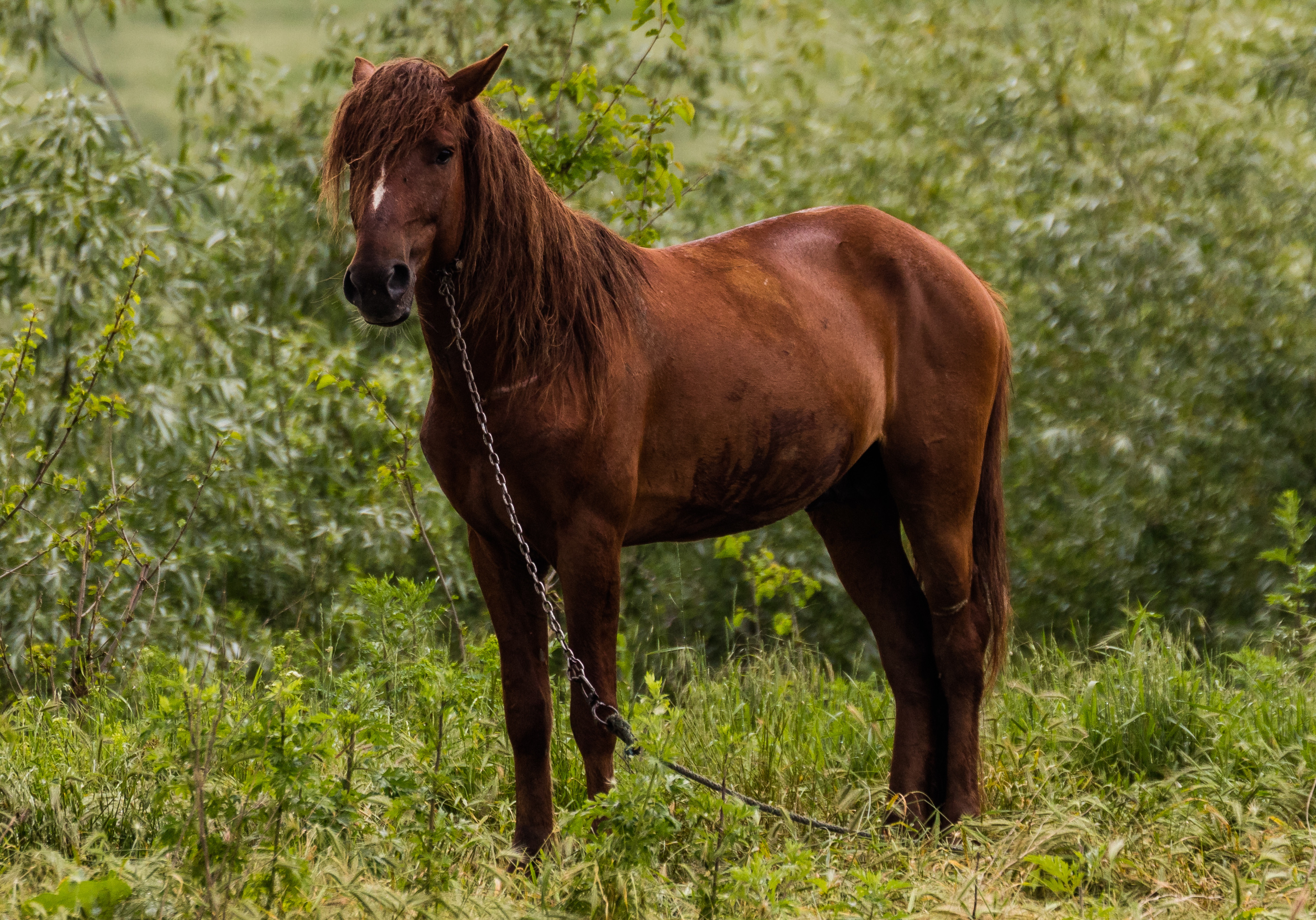
- Country of origin: Romania

The Danube Delta horses are a population of feral horses in Romania. They live in and around Letea Forest in the Danube Delta, between the Sulina and Chilia branches of the Danube. About 4000 feral horses live in the Danube Delta, 2000 of them in the Letea nature reserve, where on one hand, they are among the last remaining "wild" (feral) horses living at large on the European continent, but are also deemed to be a threat to the flora of the forest, including some plants on the IUCN Red List of Threatened Species.

Although there have been feral horses in the region for hundreds of years, their numbers greatly increased after the collective farms were closed down in 1990 and the horses belonging to them were freed. The Letea population is not regulated and there are concerns that overgrazing is a looming problem.

The horses on Letea Island are black or bay, without white spots. They stand between 1.45 and 1.50 m (14.1 and 14.3 hands) and are strongly built. They are different from the smaller horses of Sfântu Gheorghe, which is nearby. They are not of a riding horse build, but are built like the working horses of Hungary.

In 2002, some of these horses were captured and transported to Italy for slaughter. Some organizations objected to removal, holding that the horses had value in being adapted to the location and possessing natural social behavior. Another push for removal and slaughter began in 2009, but horses cannot be currently removed from the area because a number of animals carry equine infectious anemia. Therefore, according to Romanian regulation, they are not allowed to be taken out of the quarantine area. Currently, there is an ongoing project, in collaboration with the World Wide Fund for Nature, seeking to find a way to remove these horses. While some organizations object to total removal and advocate for some animals to remain, others are attempting to find a different preserve for the horses to live.
