= Letea Forest =

Natural reservation in Romania

- Pădurea Letea
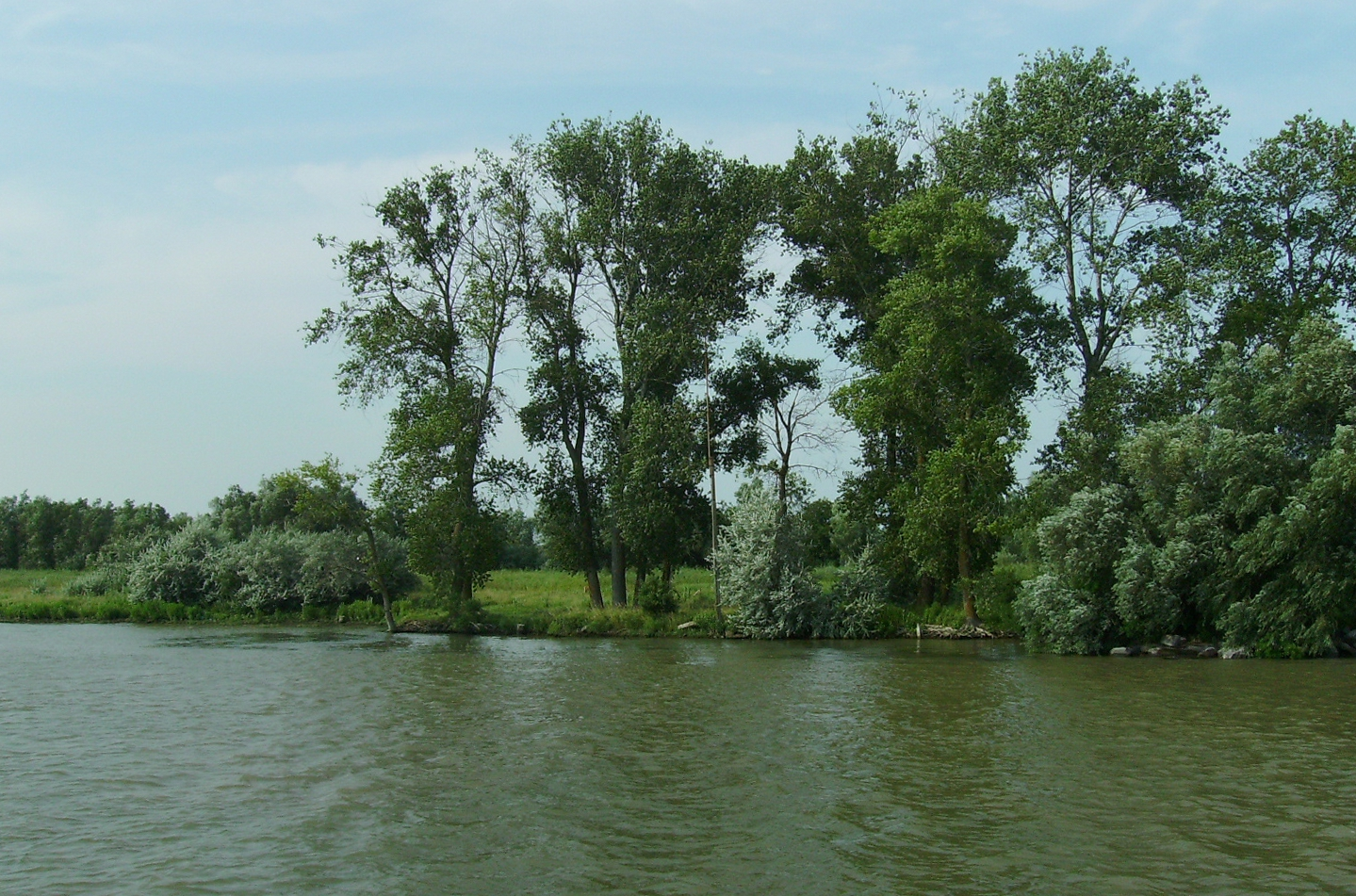

- Location within Romania
- Location: Danube Delta Biosphere Reserve; Tulcea County, Romania
- Nearest city: Vylkove, Ukraine
- Coordinates: 45°20′24″N 29°32′13″E
- Area: 2,825 ha or 6,980 acres or 28.25 km^{2}
- Established: 1938

Letea Forest is the oldest natural reservation in Romania. It was established in 1938, when the Romanian Council of Ministers passed Decision No. 645 declaring the forest a nature reserve. It is located between the Sulina and Chilia branches of Danube in the Danube Delta. It covers an area of approximately 2,825 ha or 28.25 km^{2} or 6,980 acres.

This forest was the initial foundation of the Danube Delta Biosphere Reserve, which has been declared a World Heritage Site. It was internationally recognized as a Biosphere Reserve under UNESCO's Man and the Biosphere Programme in 1992.

It has a subtropical aspect, due to the presence of the tropical creeper named Periploca graeca. This is a Mediterranean plant which finds its most northern refuge in the Danube Delta. Along with this, types of liana and other climbing plants are woven on the branches of the trees, such as the wild vine, common hop and ivy. In addition, there are extremely high sand dunes, some reaching as high as 12.4 metres (41 ft). These sand dunes are interspersed with damp subsidences in the soil. Lush trees grow in these subsidences, since they provide nourishing settings for verdure.

Letea Forest is formed mainly by trees like white poplar, black poplar, elms, pedunculate oak, silver lime, narrow-leaved ash and common alder. Along with those above, it is completed by a great diversity of sub-shrub species.

It is also home to a rich faunal assemblage, including red-footed falcon, white-tailed eagle, European roller, Eurasian hoopoe, the snake Vipera ursinii, and the Danube Delta horse. There are approximately 1600 insect species identified from the reservation. The Letea Forest is also home to half-wild horses, although a project is currently underway to collect these horses into a broad but confined area, in order to prevent them damaging newer forest growth.
