= Gun carriage =

Artillery component

A gun carriage is a frame or a mount that supports the gun barrel of an artillery piece, allowing it to be maneuvered and fired. These platforms often had wheels so that the artillery pieces could be moved more easily. Gun carriages are also used on ships to facilitate the movement and aiming of large cannons and guns. These are also used in the funeral procession of any higher authority of any state and country.

== Early guns ==
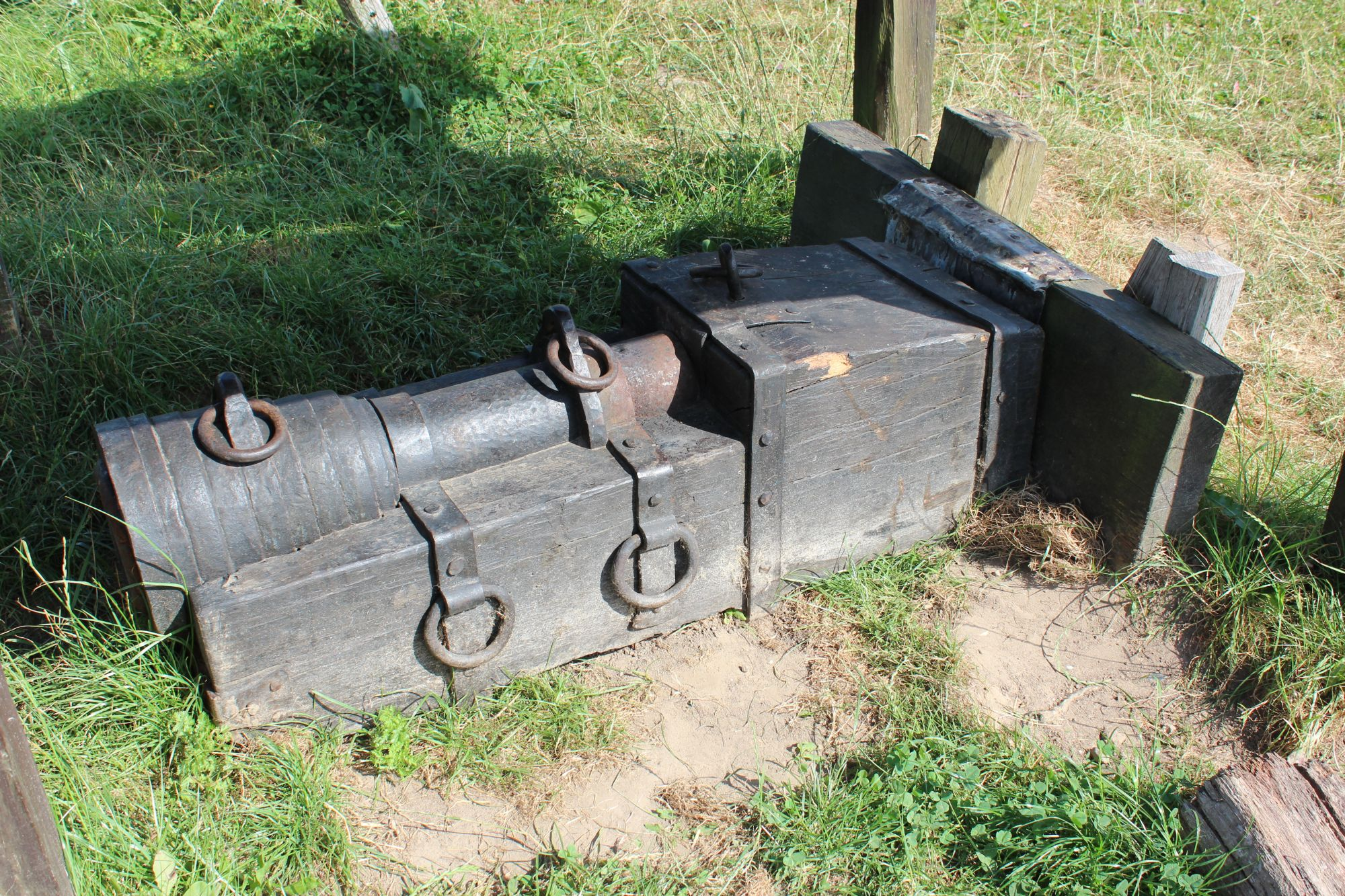
A medieval bombard on a wooden bed staked to the ground.

The earliest guns were laid directly onto the ground, with earth being piled up under the muzzle end of the barrel to increase the elevation. As the size of guns increased, they began to be attached to heavy wooden frames or beds that were held down by stakes. These began to be replaced by wheeled carriages in the early 16th century.

== Smoothbore gun carriages ==
From the 16th to the mid-19th century, the main form of artillery remained the smoothbore cannon. By this time, the trunnion (a short axle protruding from either side of the gun barrel) had been developed, with the result that the barrel could be held in two recesses in the carriage and secured with an iron band, the "capsquare". This simplified elevation, which was achieved by raising or lowering the breech of the gun by means of a wedge called a quoin or later by a steel screw. During this time, the design of gun carriages evolved only slowly, with the trend being towards lighter carriages carrying barrels that were able to throw a heavier projectile. There were two main categories of gun carriages:

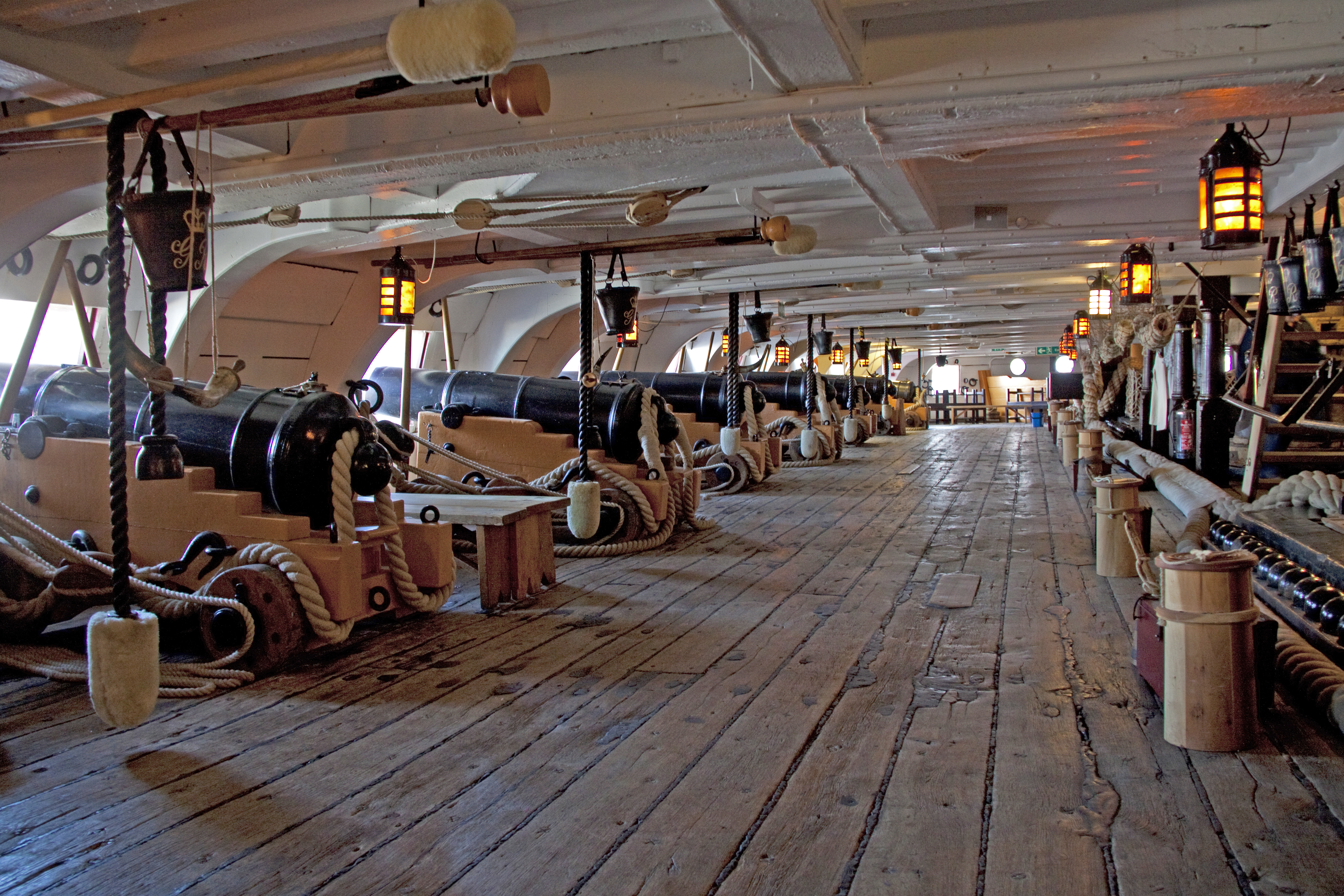
Naval or garrison carriages on gun deck

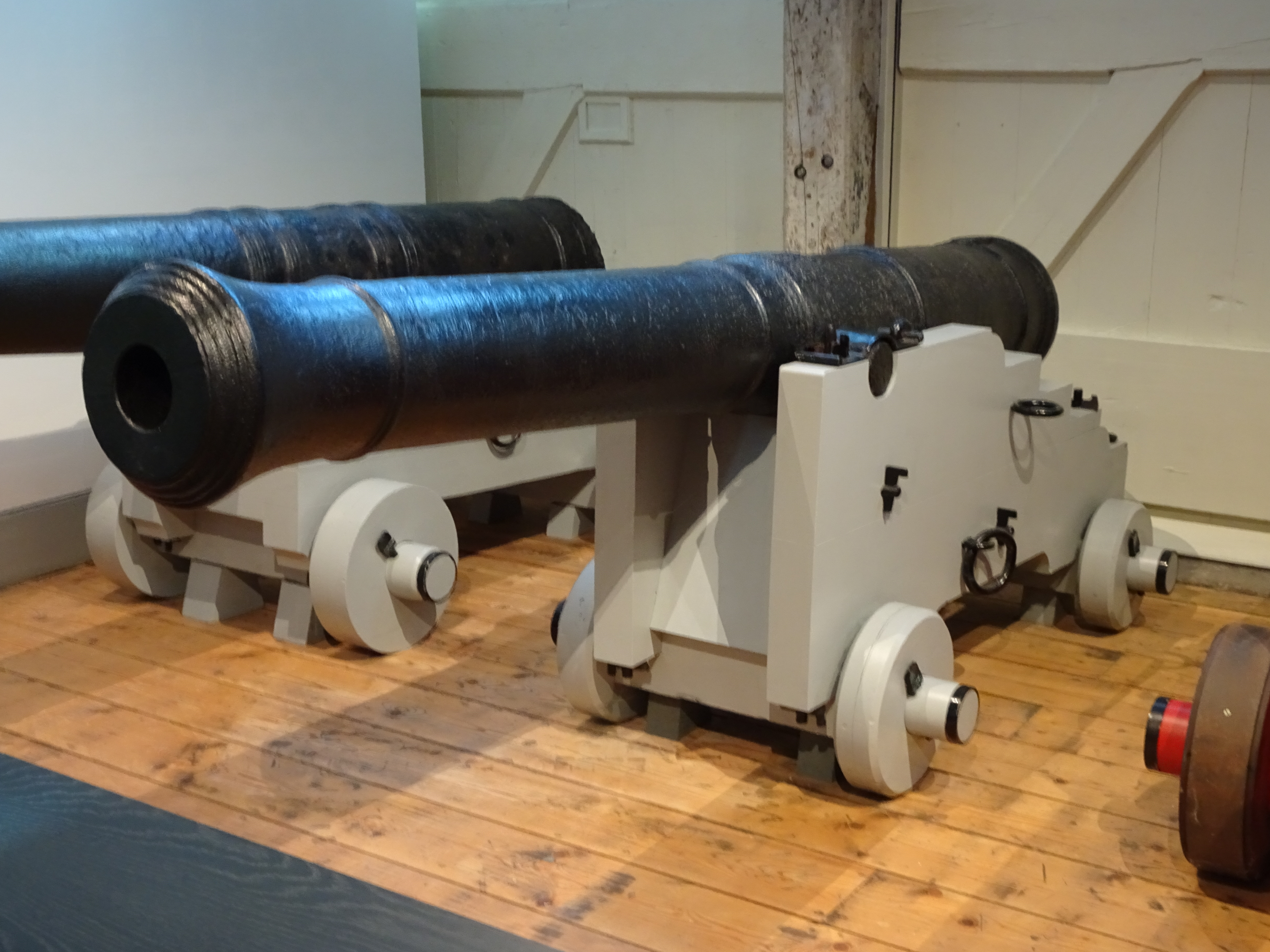
9 pdr Armstrong Cannon 1722 pattern on a 1725 pattern carriage at the Chatham Historic Dockyard

=== Naval or garrison carriages ===
These were designed for use aboard a ship or within a fortification and consisted of two large wooden slabs called "cheeks" held apart by bracing pieces called "transoms". The trunnions of the gun barrel sat on the top of the cheeks; the rearward part of each cheek was stepped so that the breech could be lifted by iron levers called "handspikes". Because these guns were not required to travel about, they were only provided with four small solid wooden wheels called "trucks", whose main function was to roll backwards with the recoil of the gun and then allow it to be moved forward into a firing position after reloading. Traversing the gun was achieved by levering the rear of the carriage sideways with handspikes. An improvement on this arrangement started at the end of the 18th century with the introduction of the traversing carriage, initially in fortifications but later on ships as well. This consisted of a stout wooden (and later iron) beam on which the entire gun carriage was mounted. The beam was fitted to a pivot at the centre, and to one or more trucks or "racers" at the front; the racers ran along a semi-circular iron track set in the floor called a "race". This allowed the gun to be swung in an arc over a parapet. Alternatively, the pivot could be fitted to the front of the beam and the racers at the rear, allowing the gun to fire through an embrasure. The traversing beam sloped upwards towards the rear, allowing the gun and its carriage to recoil up the slope.

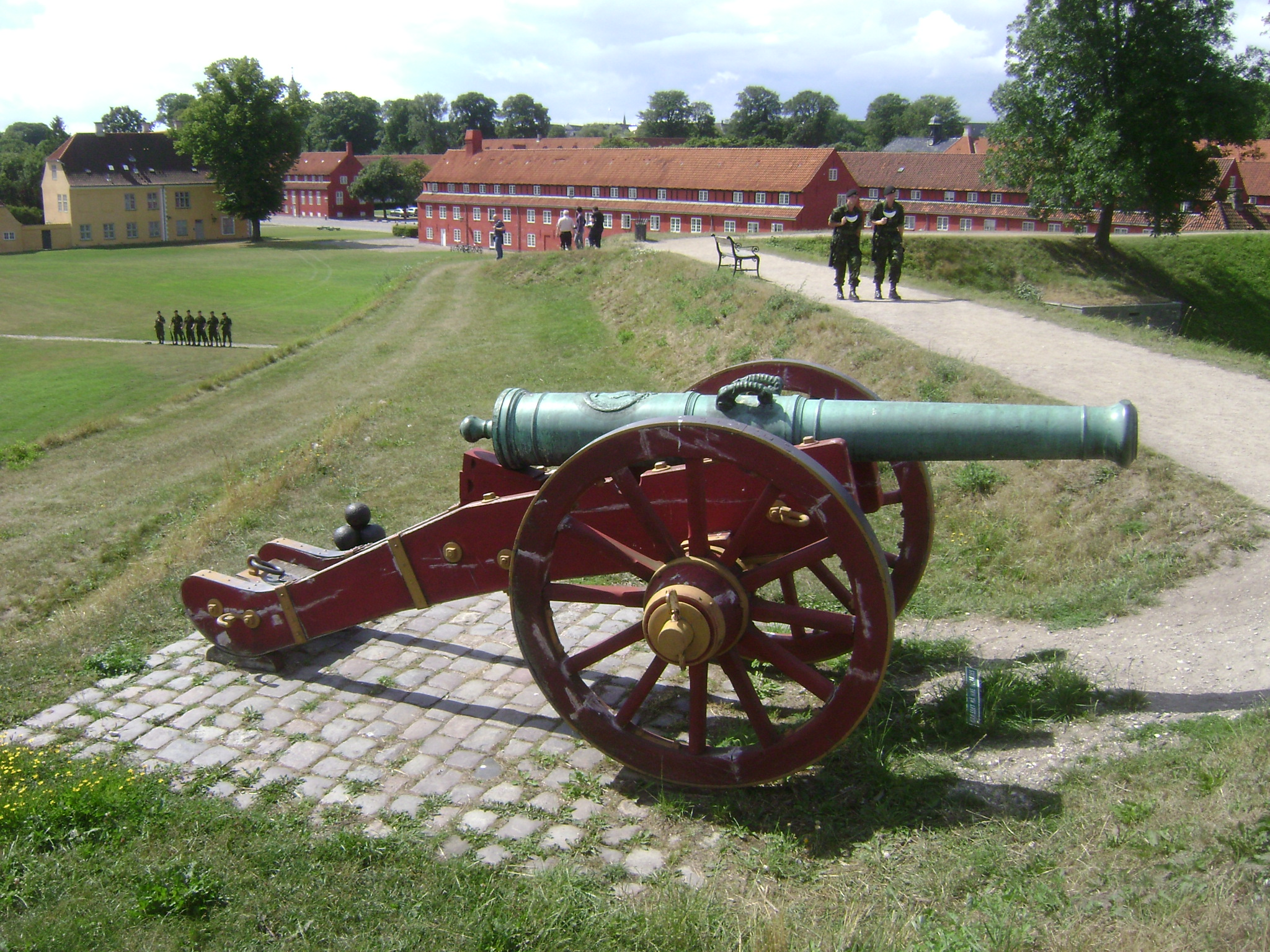
A Danish cannon on a typical 18th century field carriage.

=== Field carriages ===
These were designed to allow guns to be deployed on the battlefield and were provided with a pair of large wheels similar to those used on carts or wagons. The cheeks of field carriages were much narrower than those on the naval carriage and the rear end, called a "trail", rested on the ground. When the gun needed to be moved any distance, the trail could be lifted onto a second separate axle called a limber, which could then be towed by a team of horses or oxen. Limbers had been invented in France in about 1550. An innovation from the mid-18th century was the invention of the "block trail", which replaced the heavy cheeks and transoms of the "double-bracket" carriage with a single wooden spar reinforced with iron.

A curricle gun was a small cannon intended to be transported upon a carriage of two wheels; the artilleryman was sitting on a box and the whole can be moved forward into action with impressive rapidity. Its caisson would contain 6 rounds of ball cartridges. It was current in 1800.

== Modern gun carriages ==
The First World War is often considered the dawn of modern artillery because, like repeating firearms, the majority of barrels were rifled, the projectiles were conical, the guns were breech loaded and many used fixed ammunition or separate loading charges and projectiles.

Some of the features of modern carriages are listed below and illustrated in the photo gallery:

- Box trail – A box trail is a type of field carriage that is rectangular in shape and consists of a ladder frame often with decking. The goal was strength and stability. Box trail carriages on howitzers often had an open area near the breech to permit the high angles of fire necessary for indirect fire. On larger guns, there often was a ramp to hold ready rounds to make reloading easier. A problem with a box trail carriage is that it often limits easy access to the breech, so the barrel needs to be lowered to load and then raised for each shot which reduces the rate of fire. At the end of WW I box trail carriages became less common. Ease of loading and rate of fire were improved by providing better access to the breech.
- Pole trail – A pole trail was sometimes used with early horse-drawn light artillery. The single trail resembled a pipe and was meant to be strong, light, easy to maneuver and easy to work around. After the First World War, pole trails became less common because light horse-drawn artillery was in decline. Some guns received new carriages to increase traverse, elevation and to make them suitable for motor traction.
- Split trail – A split trail carriage, invented by Joseph-Albert Deport in 1907-1908, has two trails which can be spread to provide greater stability, and greater angles of elevation and traverse, and easier access to the breech for reloading at different angles. Since the carriage is stationary, traverse and elevation are controlled by separate hand wheels. Many guns produced since the First World War have used the split trail configuration.
- Outriggers – Since the First World War many anti-aircraft guns have had collapsible two, three, and four outrigger carriages with leveling jacks to provide stability, high-angle fire, and 360° traverse. The three outrigger carriages tend to have two detachable wheels for transport, while four-outrigger carriages have four. The four-outrigger versions are often referred to as cruciform carriages because when their outriggers are deployed they form a cross.
- Gun shields – Not all modern guns have shields. Before World War I, shields were intended to provide gun crews with protection at shorter ranges from the recently invented repeating rifles and shrapnel shells when they were engaged in direct fire. During the First World War on the Western Front, machine guns and fast-firing light field guns firing shrapnel shells made massed infantry or cavalry attacks over open ground too costly, so both sides sought to protect their men and artillery behind trenches and fortifications. Since the fighting was being conducted from behind fortifications shields became less important and were sometimes done away with to save weight. After the First World War shields were mostly used on small caliber direct-fire guns ranging in size from 20–120 mm (0.79–4.7 in). Guns larger than 120 mm usually had the advantage of range and were indirect fire weapons so shields were sometimes omitted.
- Recoil mechanism – Early guns had no mechanism to absorb recoil and the gun had to be repositioned after each shot. Later, ramps were used and the gun would roll up the ramp and gravity would roll the gun back into position. The majority of field guns produced since 1900 have had some sort of mechanical recoil mechanism. These can be broken down into two related subsystems: one absorbs the recoil while the other returns the gun to firing position. The part which absorbs the recoil is most often a hydraulic shock absorber, while the part that returns the gun to firing position is a pneumatic recuperator. This is usually shortened to hydro-pneumatic in technical documents. Another option is a hydraulic shock absorber and a spring recuperator. This is usually shortened to hydro-spring in technical documents. These systems can be identified as cylinders on top or below the gun barrel. The recoil system can either be integral with the barrel or the carriage. Some guns designed before recoil mechanisms became integrated on the gun carriage could be attached to an external shock absorber which was a spring/rubber tether that attached to an eyelet on the base of the gun carriage and was attached to a ground anchor at the other end. Guns which could use external shock absorbers include the De Bange 155 mm cannon and Canon de 120 mm modèle 1878.
- Recoil spade or ground spade – The purpose of a spade is to anchor the carriage and stop it from rolling backward when the gun is fired. Spades are normally located at the end of the carriage and their shape resembles a plow or shovel. Some artillery pieces designed before hydro-pneumatic recoil mechanism became common used recoil spades with coil springs or rubber shock absorbers such as the 76 mm gun M1900 and Obusier de 120 mm C mle 1897 Schneider-Canet.
- Elevation and range – As the First World War progressed, range and elevation became more important. Range was important because each side wanted to reduce their artillery losses in a war of attrition, and one of the best ways to do that was by outranging the enemy's artillery. At first, elevation was fairly easy to accomplish because both sides just propped up their guns on ramps or earthen embankments to increase the range of their shells. Existing carriages were also modified to get higher angles of elevation. Since both sides were dug in, the most effective way to attack the enemy was vertically through indirect fire to drop high-explosive shells into the trenches. At the end of the First World War, most guns had higher angles of elevation and greater range. There was also a trend towards lighter guns firing larger projectiles since the light field guns of World War I were not effective firing light projectiles with limited explosive yield.
- Equilibrators – Equilibrators are devices that balance a barrel when its center of mass is not aligned with trunnions. They store potential energy when the barrel (its center of mass) is lowered, and release it when it needs to be raised by counteracting the downward force of weight by upwards pressure of compressed elastic elements similar to those employed in recoil mechanisms: hydropneumatic, pneumatic, coil springs or torsion bars. Equilibrators can vary in number and orientation, but they are often paired vertically or inclined on either side of the barrel near the trunnions and/or the breech. This feature became increasingly common in guns and howitzers with relatively long barrels after WWI.
- Motor traction – The majority of guns used during the First World War were horse-drawn. Even in the Second World War, many guns were still horse-drawn. However, towards the end of the First World War, some were converted from horse traction to motor traction. The conversion process often involved replacing wooden spoked wheels with metal wheels with either solid rubber or pneumatic tires. This simple conversion was sufficient as long as the towing vehicle wasn't very fast, like a Holt tractor. But as towing vehicles became faster, the axles needed to be sprung in order to withstand the punishment of towing. Most carriages produced since the First World War have been sprung with leaf springs or torsion bars and have used rubber tires.
- Limbers and caissons – Although neither limbers nor caissons are new inventions, many guns have used them. A limber is a two-wheeled cart that attaches to the trail of the gun for towing. This also often serves as a tool and ammunition wagon for the gun crew. Originally, limbers were used with horse-drawn artillery, but they can also be used with motor traction. Since the end of the Second World War, the use of limbers has declined with the increase in capabilities of motor traction. Often when viewing weight specifications for guns there will be one for travel and one for combat: normally the specification for travel will be larger because of the limber with supplies.
- Large guns and multiple loads – Light guns could be transported in one piece but larger guns often broke down into multiple loads on trailers for towing. This was particularly true before motor traction because the whole gun was often too heavy for a single horse team to tow, so large guns were broken down into multiple wagon loads with each load being towed by a single horse team. Even after motor traction, many large guns had the option of being broken down into two or three wagon loads for towing, while others have the ability to detach the gun barrel from the recoil mechanism and pulled back to lay on top of the trail while being towed. This was done because long guns were barrel-heavy and could tip while being towed. During the Second World War, heavy artillery was increasingly mounted on tank chassis in order to improve mobility, and this trend has continued with today's self-propelled artillery. The advantage is this artillery can go anywhere a tank can and can be ready for action in minutes without any assembly.
- Mountain or pack artillery – Some guns have the ability to be broken down into multiple loads for carrying by pack animals such as mules or by teams of men. Each load is small enough and light enough for a pack animal or man to carry. This is an advantage in mountainous terrain because there may not be roads or the terrain is too rough for towing. The parts are normally constructed with multiple joints and held together by pins. This lightness and portability has led pack guns to be used in a number of roles such as heliborne or airborne operations. Mountain guns were common during the First and Second World War, but have been largely replaced since then with rockets, mortars and recoilless guns.

== State and military funerals ==
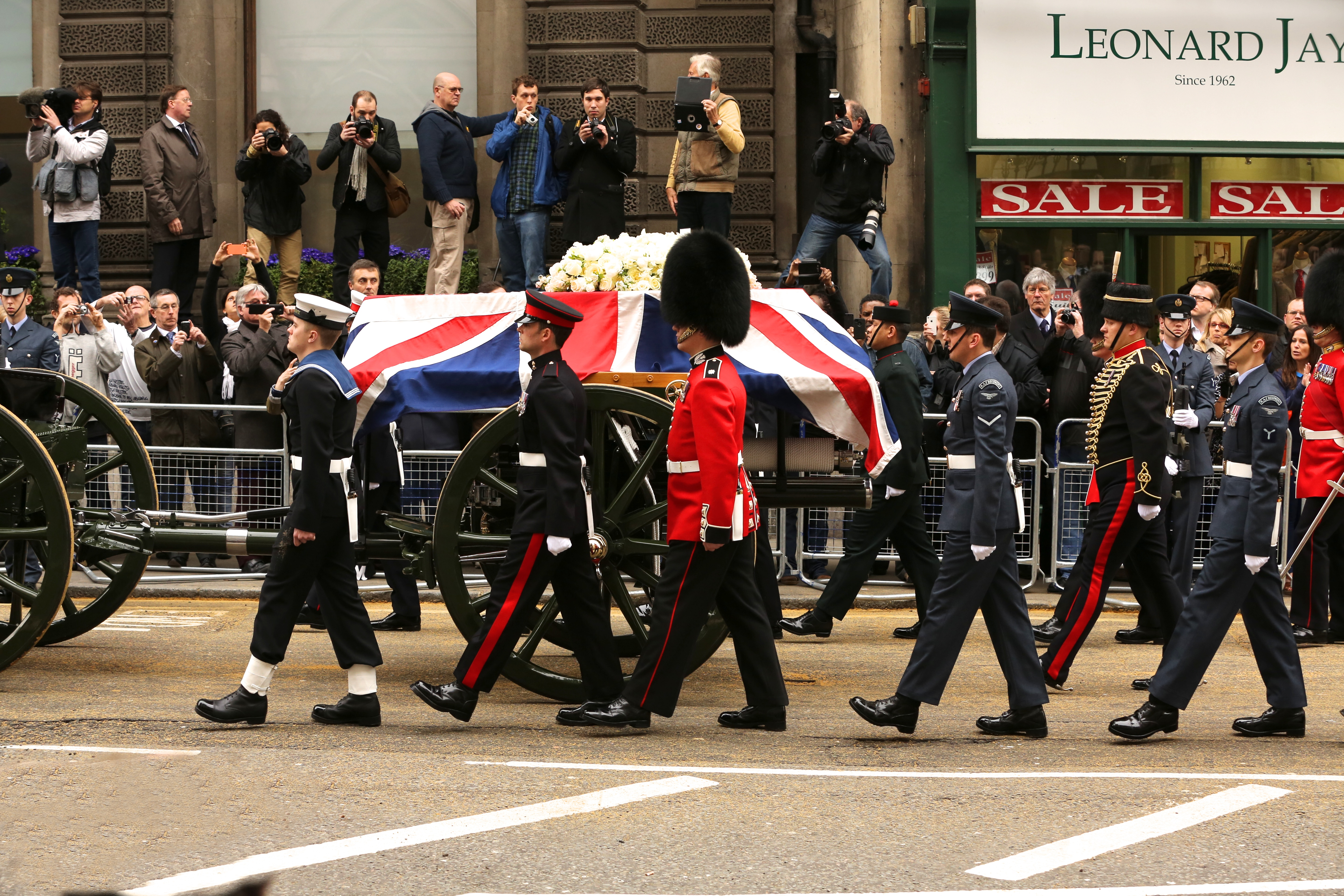
Margaret Thatcher's coffin being carried on a 13-pounder gun carriage in 2013.

Gun carriages have been used to carry the coffin of fallen soldiers and officers at military funerals and holders of high office with a military connection in state funerals to their final resting place. The practice has its origins in war and appears in the nineteenth century in the Queens regulations of the British Army.

In the United Kingdom, in a state funeral, the Royal Navy State Funeral Gun Carriage bearing the coffin is drawn by sailors from the Royal Navy rather than horses. (This tradition dates from the funeral of Queen Victoria; the horses drawing the gun carriage bolted, so ratings from the Royal Navy hauled it to the Royal Chapel at Windsor.) This distinguishing feature is not invariable, however, as shown by the use of naval ratings rather than horses at the ceremonial funeral for Lord Mountbatten in 1979, which was one of a number of features on that occasion which emphasized Mountbatten's lifelong links with the Royal Navy.

In state funerals in the United States, a caisson (a two-wheeled ammunition wagon), is used in place of a gun carriage.

At the 2015 state funeral of Lee Kuan Yew in Singapore, the coffin was mounted on a 25-pounder gun towed by a Mercedes-Benz G-Class.

In 2025, at the state funeral of José Mujica in Uruguay a four wheeled gun carriage drawn by six horses was used to carry the coffin.

== Gallery ==
Film: Austro-Daimler artillery tractor of the Hungarian Red army in Kassa, 1919 (1080p)

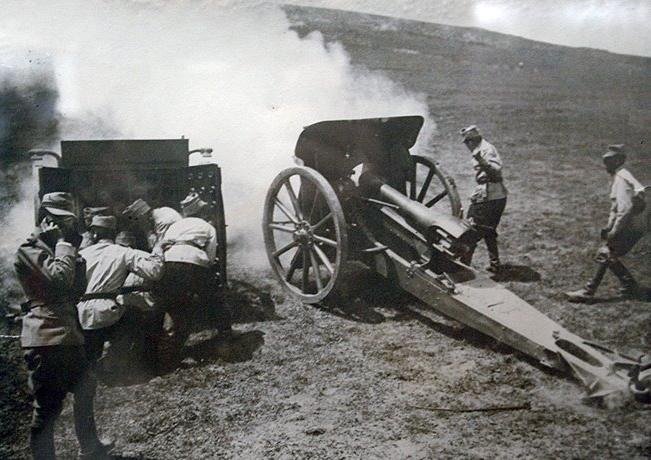
A 10.5 cm Feldhaubitze M.12 with a box trail carriage. Below the breech is an open space to increase elevation.

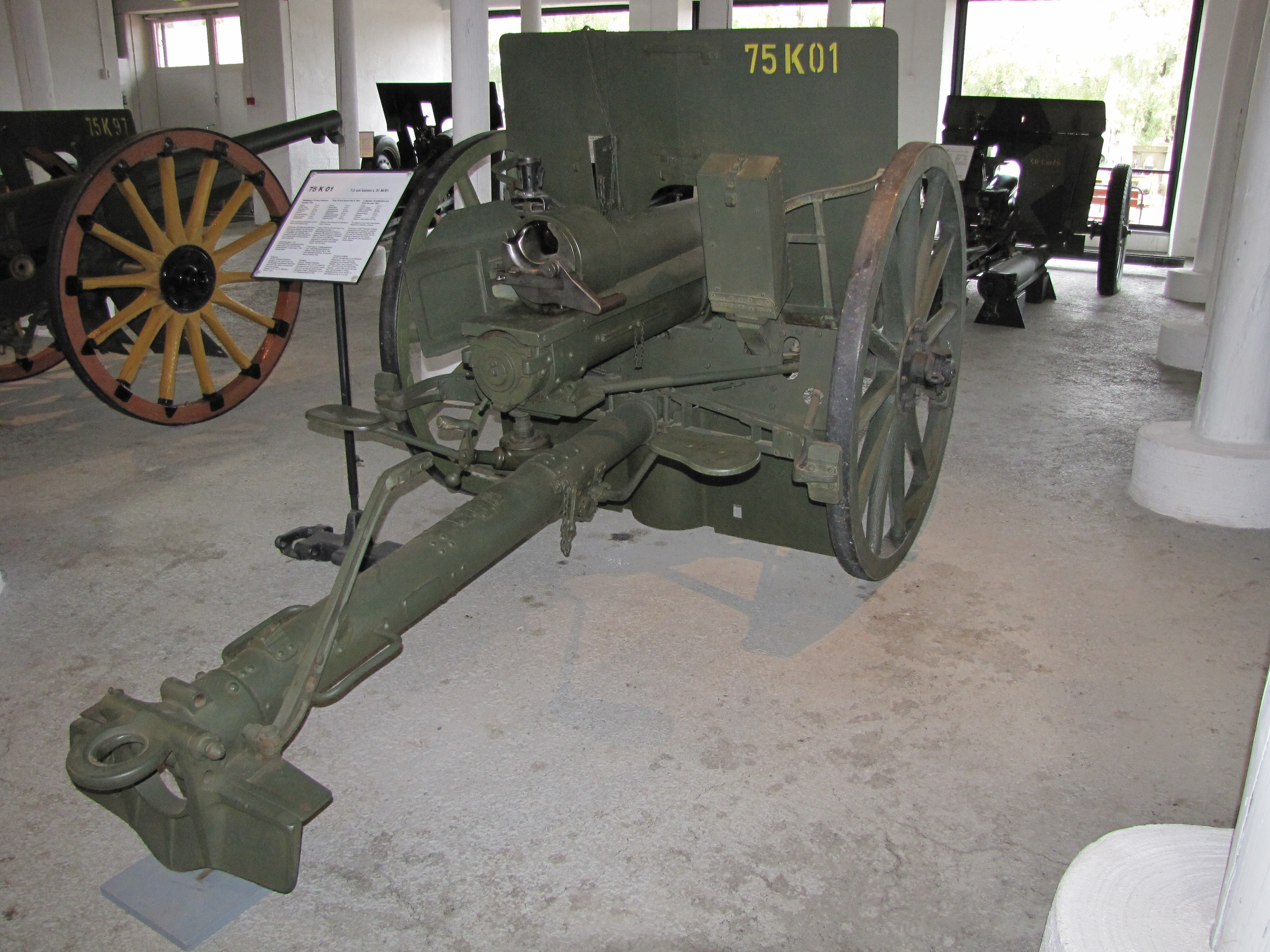
An Ehrhardt 7.5 cm Model 1901 with pole trail, spoked wooden wheels, gun shield and recoil spade. This is a typical WWI era, horse-drawn, direct fire, field gun.

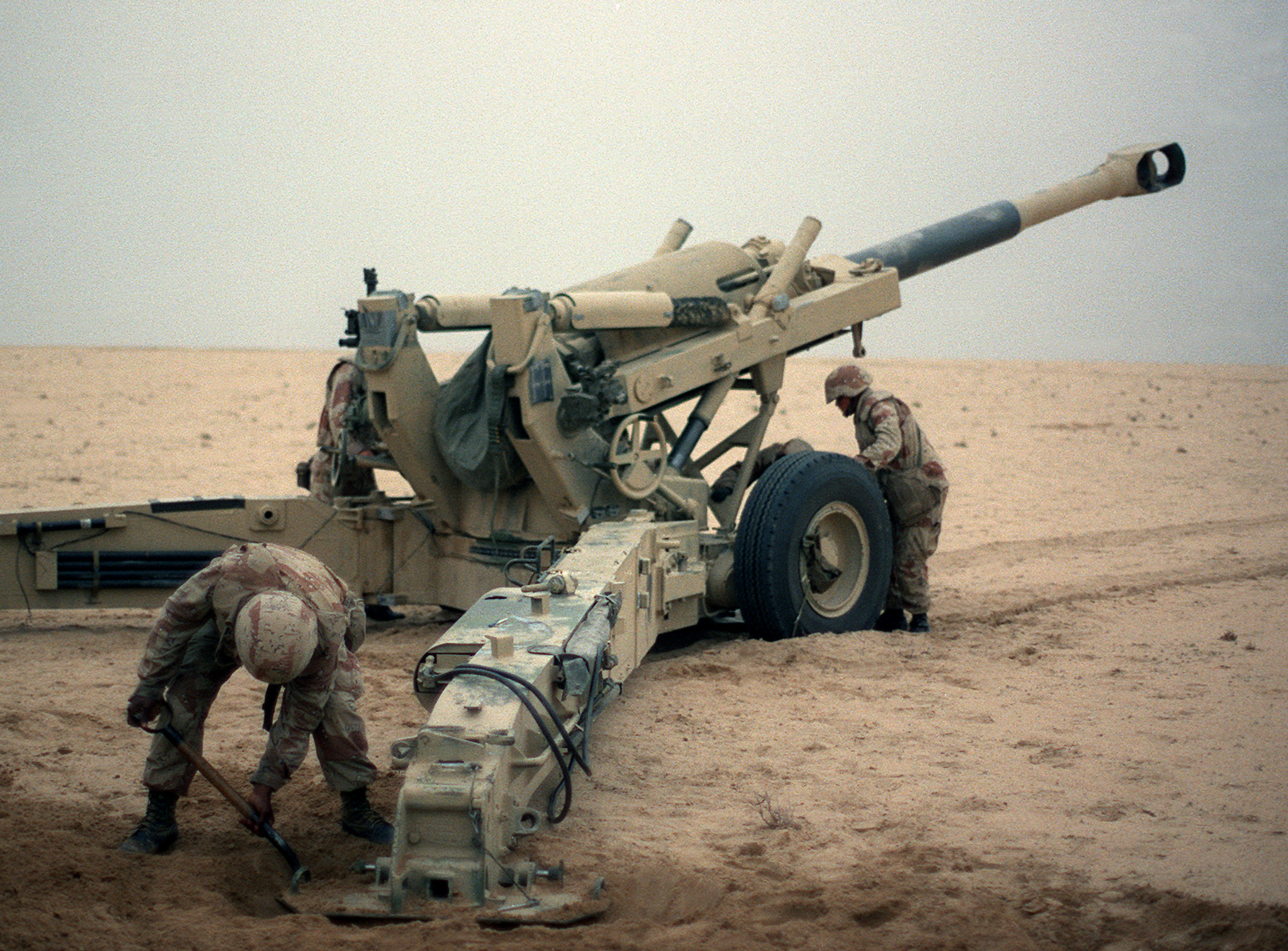
A M198 Howitzer with a split trail carriage which is capable of wide angles of traverse and elevation. The two cylinders on either side of the barrel are equilibriators.

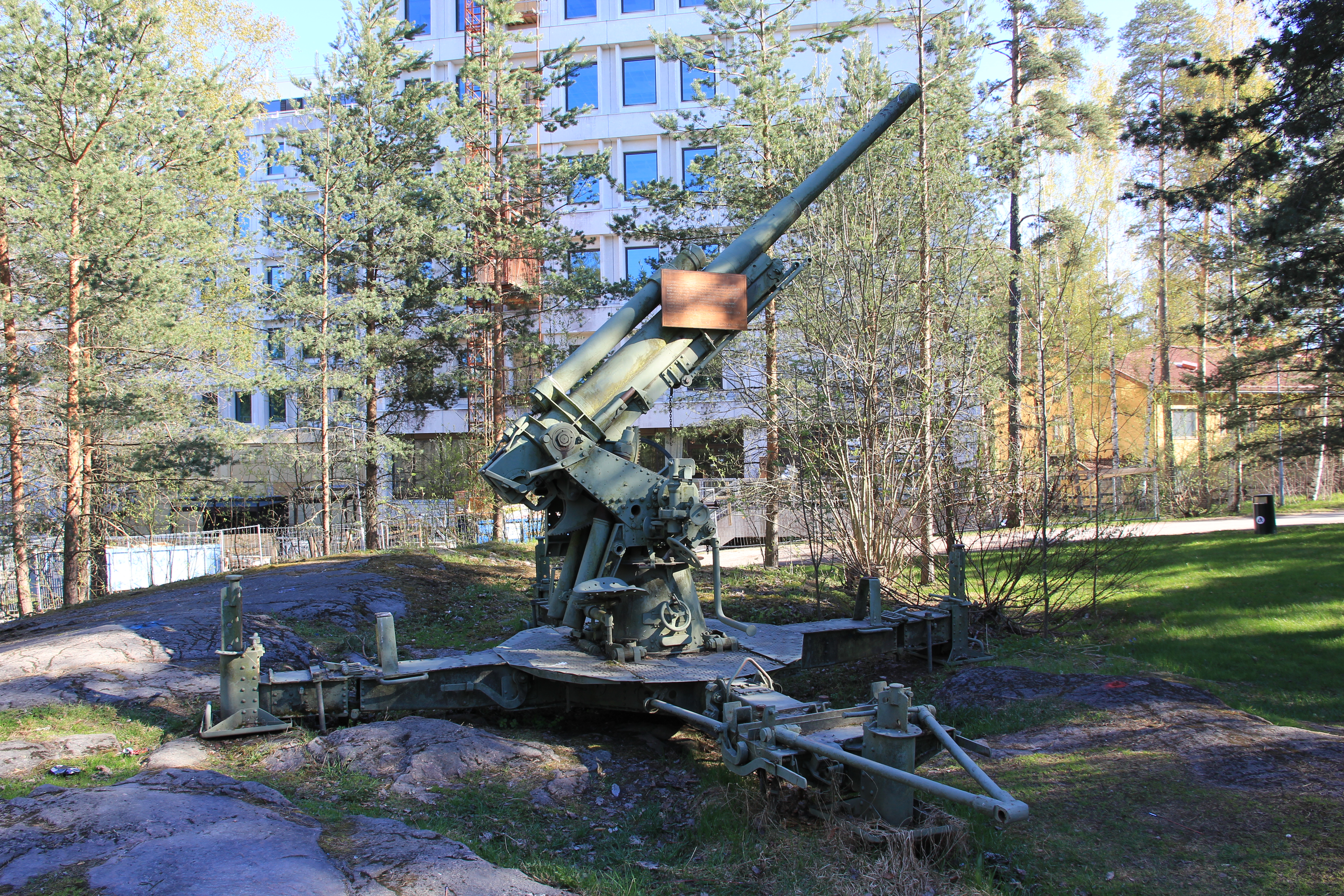
A 76 mm air defense gun M1931 with three collapsible outriggers.

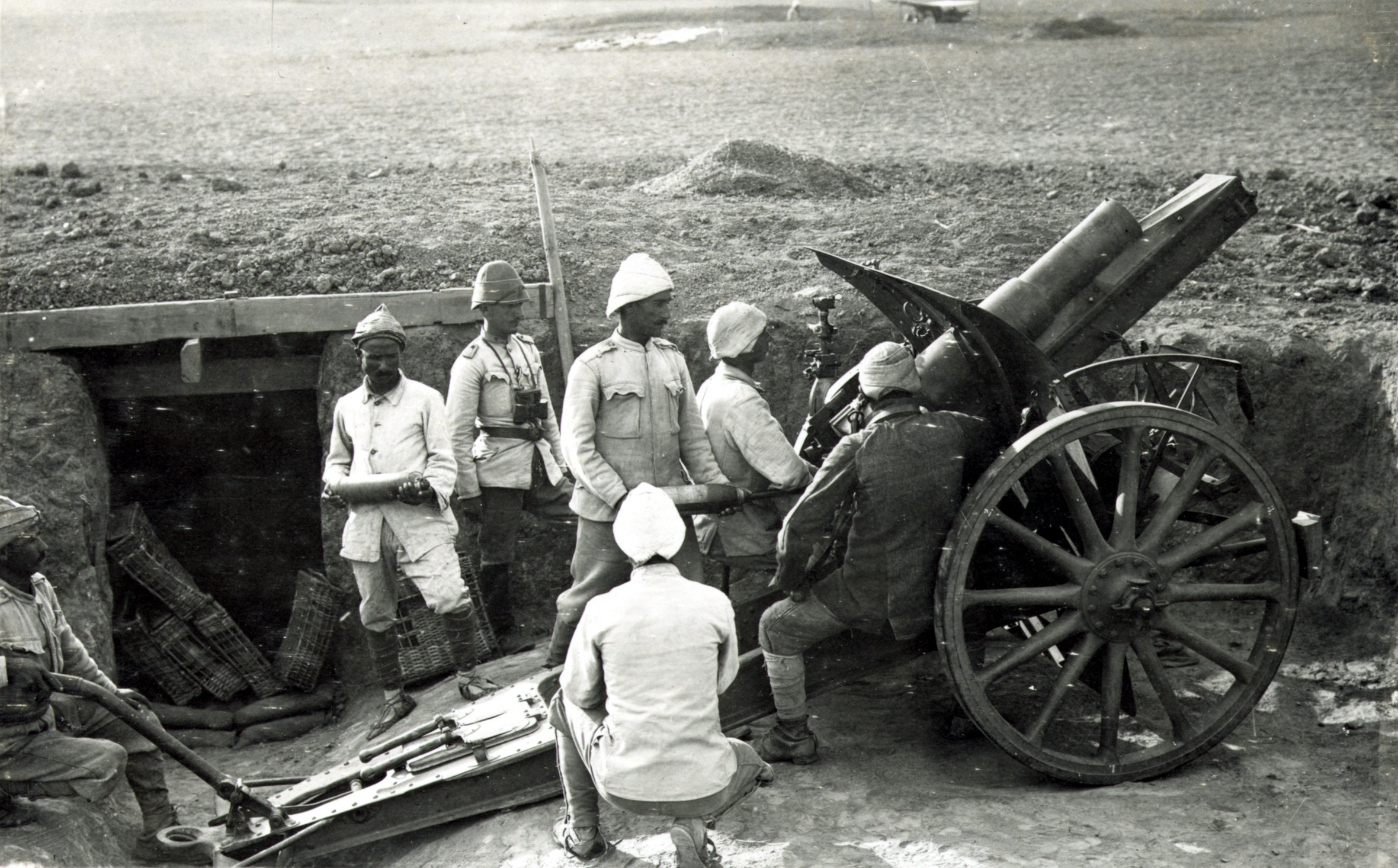
Although short ranged the 10.5 cm Feldhaubitze 98/09 was capable of high-angle indirect fire. Guns like this became more common during WWI as both sides dug in. Most guns produced after WWI were capable of high-angle fire and had longer range.

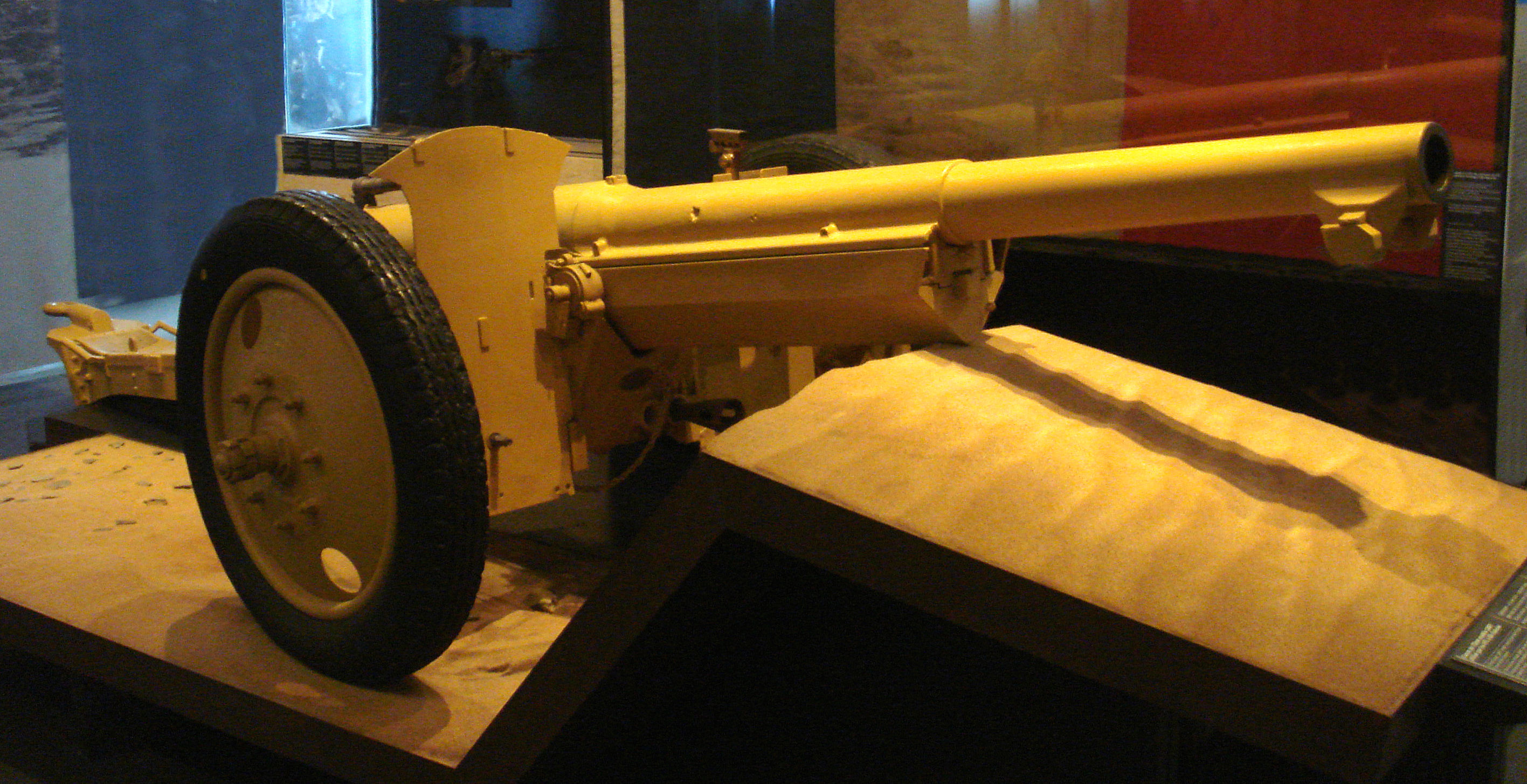
A Canon de 75 modèle 1897 field gun modified for motor traction with pneumatic tires. The device beneath the barrel was the hydro-pneumatic recoil mechanism.

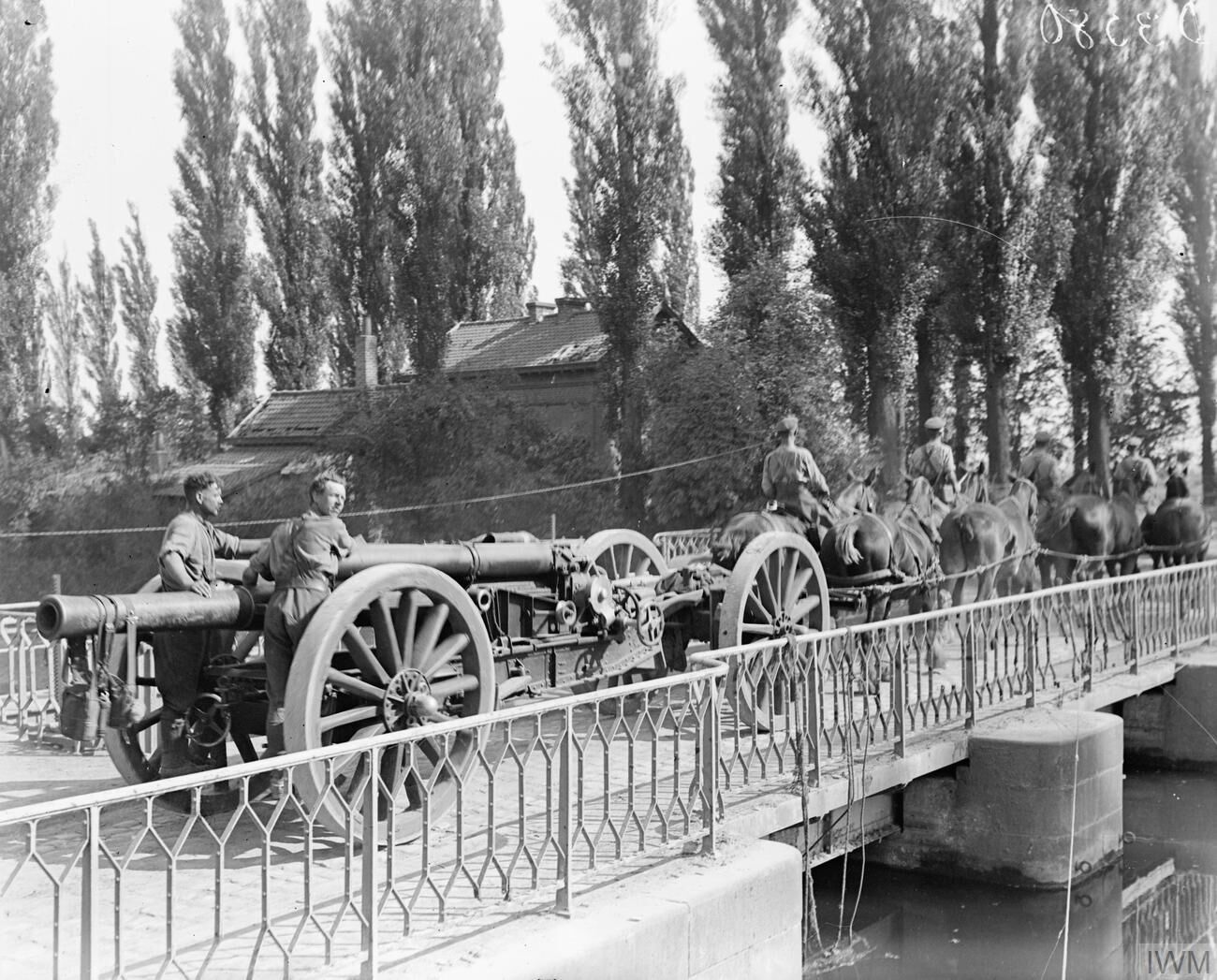
A 60 pounder with a limber towed by a horse-team. Its barrel has been pulled back to rest on its trail for transport.

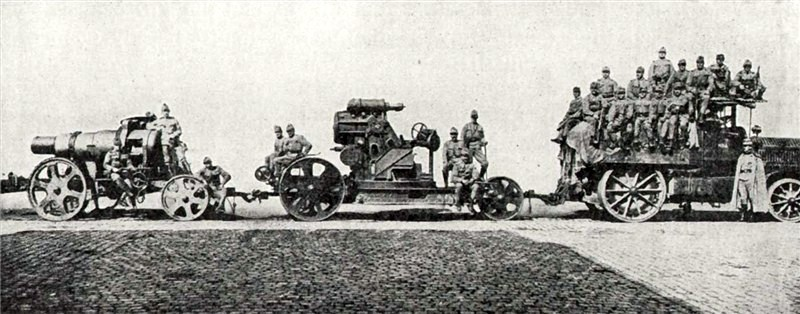
A Skoda 305 mm Model 1911 siege howitzer disassembled for transport.

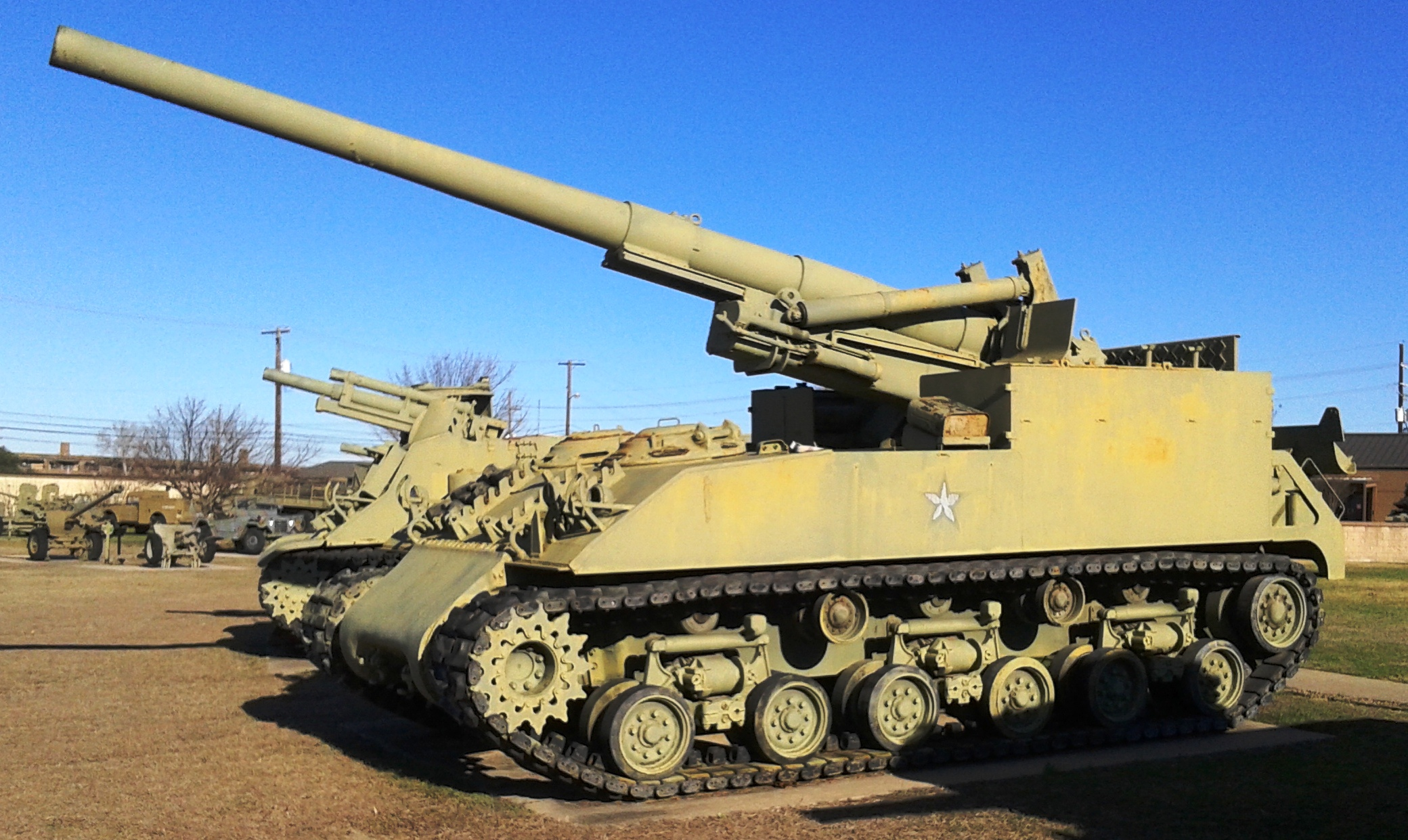
A M40 gun motor carriage self-propelled gun. The weight and complexity of guns in WWII eventually led to mounting them on a tank chassis to give them better mobility.

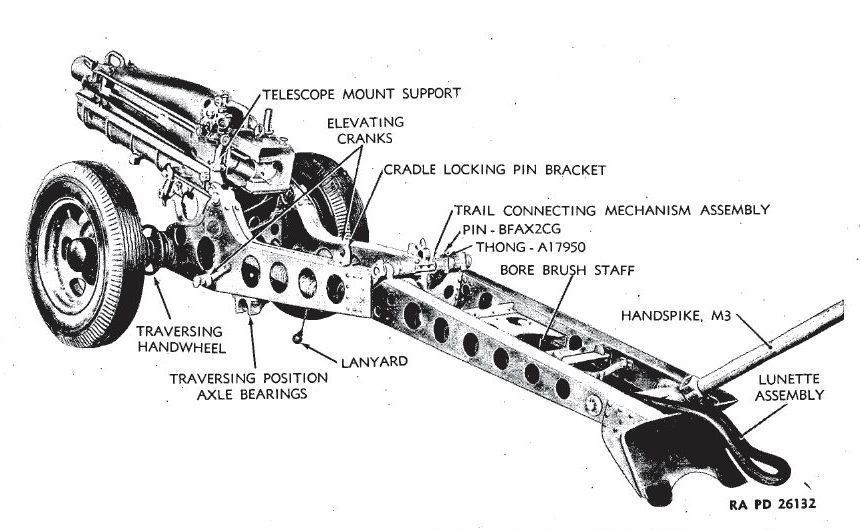
A M116 Howitzer diagram indicating the joints and pins used to disassemble this mountain gun for transport.

== See also ==
- Limbers and caissons
- Gun turret
