= Capsquare =

Military equipment

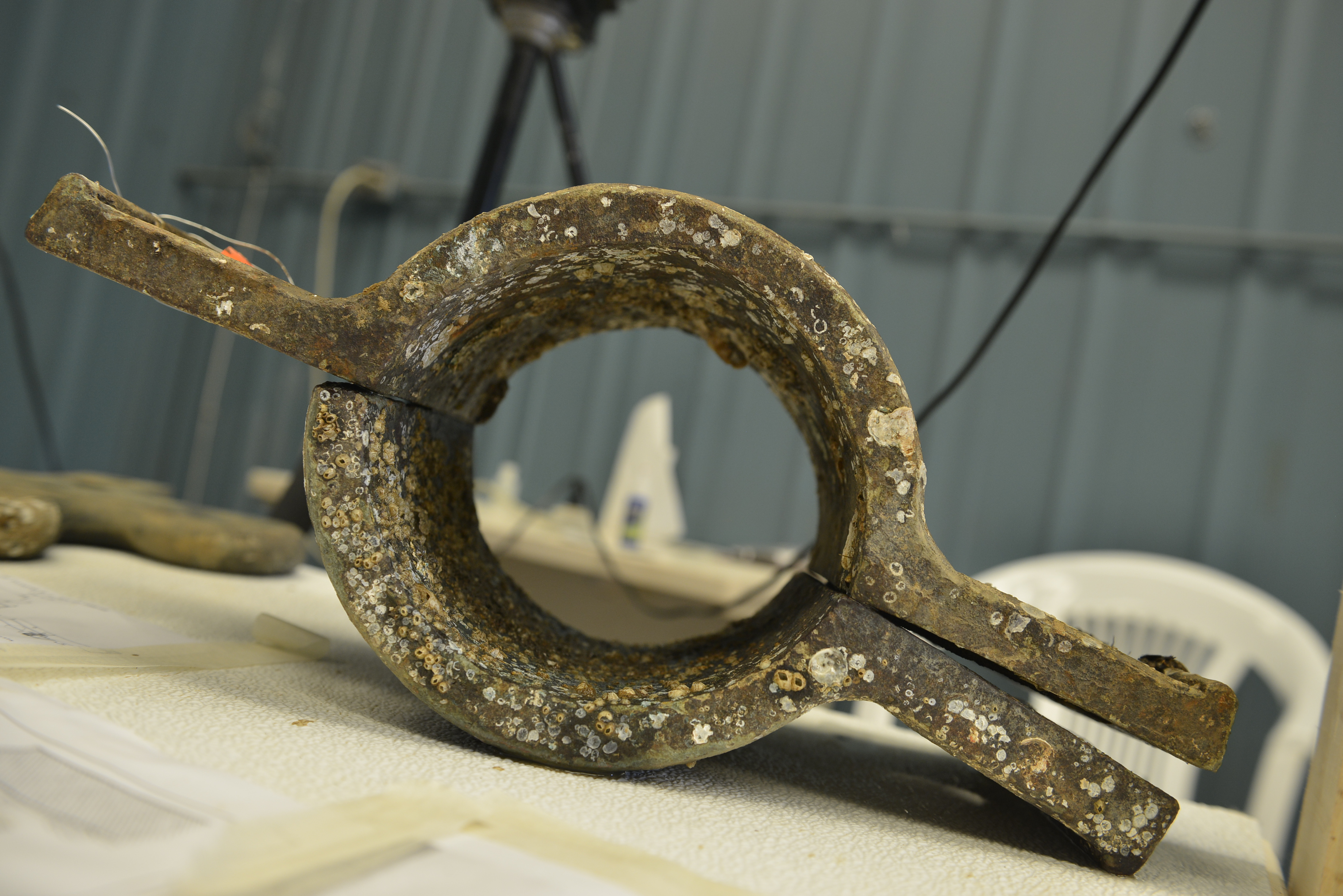
An old capsquare (both top and bottom pieces)

In artillery, capsquares, or capsquires, are strong plates of iron which come over the trunnions of a cannon, keeping it in its carriage. They are fastened by hinges to the paizeplate, so that it could be lifted up and down. They form a part of an arch in the middle, to receive a third part of the thickness of the trunnions; for two thirds of them are let into the carriage, and the other end is fastened by two iron wedges, which are called the forelocks, and keys.
