= Mane (horse) =

Hair that grows from the top of the neck of an equine

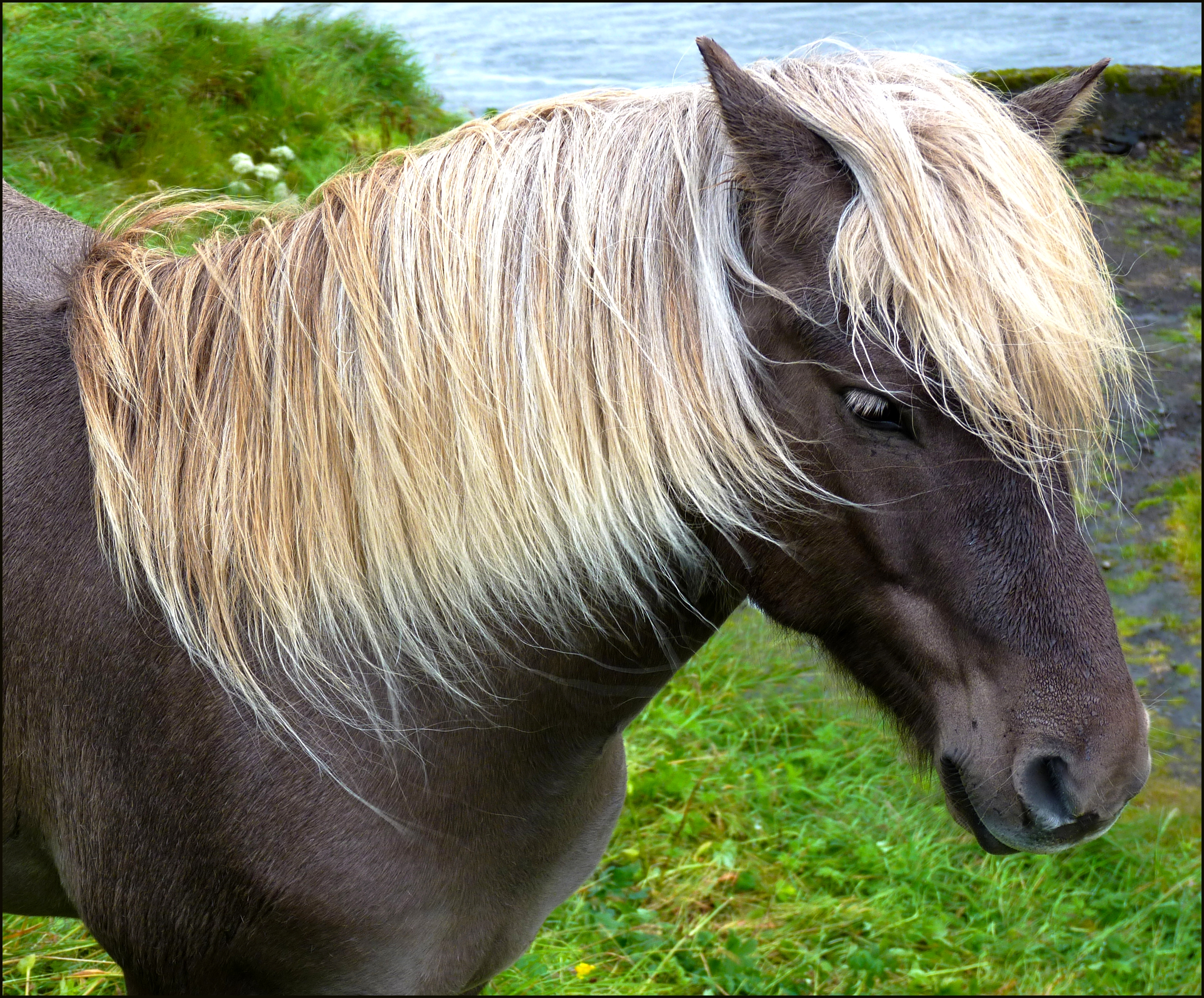
The lighter colored hairs on this horse are its mane

On horses, the mane is the hair that grows from the top of the neck of a horse or other equine, reaching from the poll to the withers, and includes the forelock or foretop. It is thicker and coarser than the rest of the horse's coat, and naturally grows to roughly cover the neck. Heredity plays a role, giving some horses a longer, thicker mane, and others a shorter, thinner one.

Some horses, such as those used in circuses or in mounted displays such as Cavalia, have manes allowed to grow down to their knees. Others have their manes deliberately shaved completely off for style or practical purposes. When ungroomed, however, the mane usually grows no longer than the width of the horse's neck, as natural wear and tear limit its potential length.

The mane is thought to keep the neck warm, and possibly to help water run off the neck if the animal cannot obtain shelter from the rain. It also provides some fly protection to the front of the horse, although the tail is usually the first defense against flies.

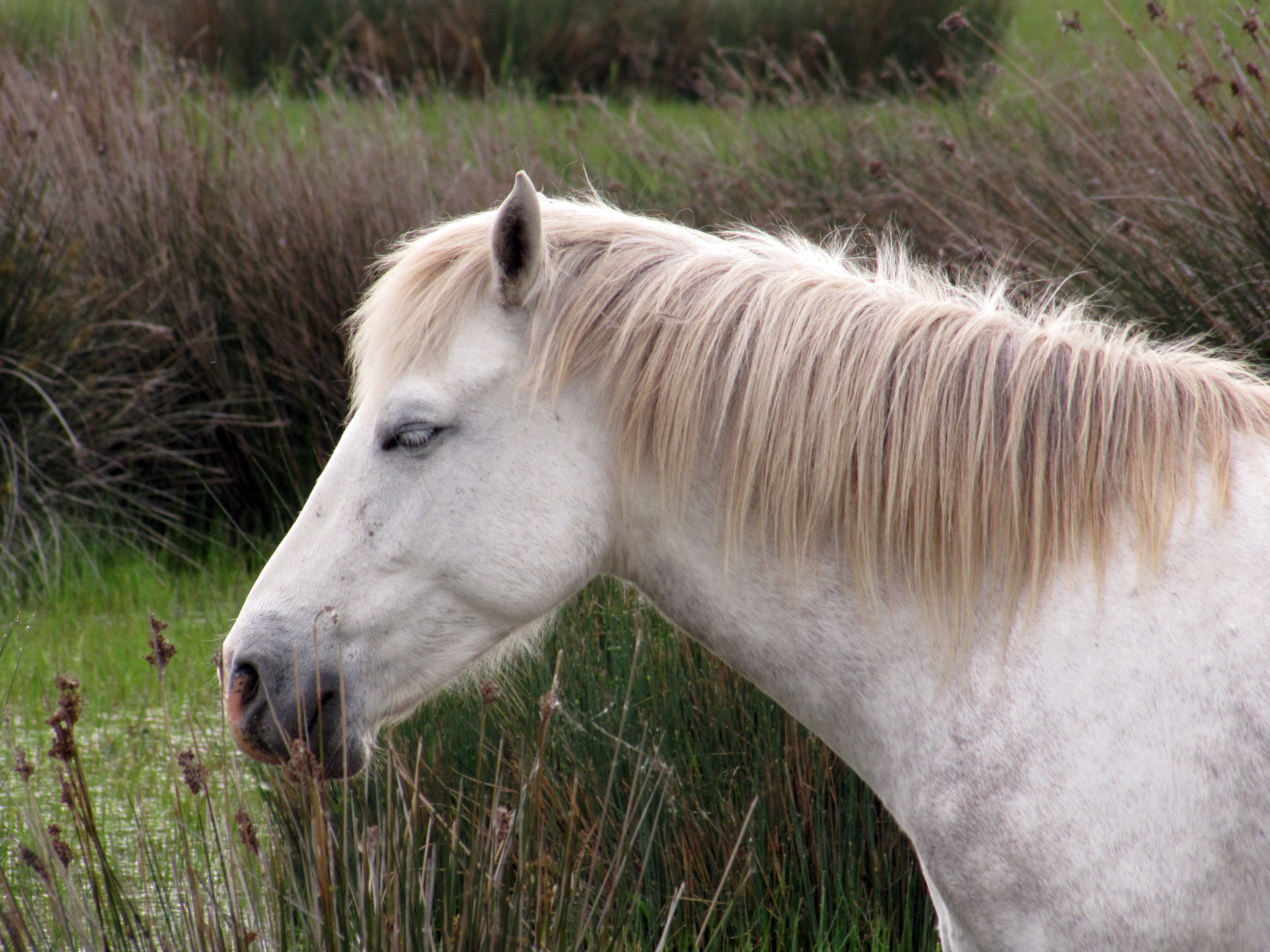
A natural mane of medium thickness and length

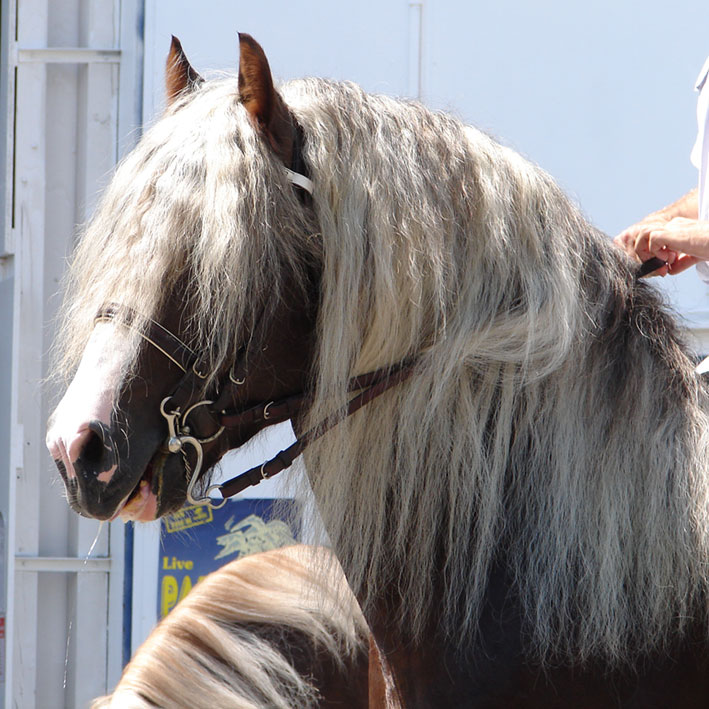
Long mane and forelock

Horse breeds have tremendous variation in thickness and length. For example, the Appaloosa usually have sparse manes, whereas Andalusians usually have thick long wavy manes. Pony breeds and draft horse breeds tend to have thick manes. Other equids such as the donkey often have very sparse, thin manes. A mane might be the same color as the body hair, or a different color altogether. The Fjord horse has a unique mane coloration of black down the center and silver on the outside edges. Traditional cutting styles were formed to highlight this unique coloration.

== Grooming ==
All domesticated horses benefit from having their manes and tails untangled regularly to remove dirt, tangles and debris. Horses with short manes usually have their manes combed, while horses with longer manes are usually groomed with a human hair brush or a stiff dandy brush. Horses with extraordinarily long manes may have their manes hand picked to remove tangles.

For a horse show, the horse is generally bathed, and this includes the mane. However, in addition to a shampoo bath, many grooms of long-maned horses also use a conditioner or cream rinse on the mane to improve shine and manageability, though for horses with braided manes, the mane may be left alone or have gels that increase stiffness and body added instead.

To make a short mane grow long and lie flat, or to make a naturally full mane grow beyond the length it might normally reach in nature, the mane can be placed into six or seven thick, moderately loose braids to prevent breaking. Many horse show exhibitors of long-maned horses also like the wavy look of a mane that has been kept braided until just before a show and may loosely braid a naturally long mane the night before a show just to obtain a fuller, wavy appearance.

Beyond basic care, the mane is styled in various ways, depending on the breed of horse, part of the world, and the equestrian discipline of the rider.

The basic ways to style the mane include:

- Natural, which includes manes conditioned to grow extremely long.
- Pulled or thinned, where small clumps of hairs are pulled out along the underside of the neck until the mane is 3 to 5 inches (76 to 127 mm) long and thin enough to lie flat against the neck.
- Braided (USA) or plaited (UK), seen primarily in English riding.
- Banded, divided into many small sections with a small rubber band placed around each, seen on some breeds used for Western riding.
- "Roached" or "hogged": shaven off down to the neck.

Regardless of style, many manes that are not roached have a bit of mane at the poll, the area immediately behind the ears, shaved in order to help the crownpiece of the bridle lie more neatly on the head. This area is called a 'bridle path'. It may vary in length from one inch to over a foot. The length of the bridle path is dependent on the discipline or breed of the horse, and is important to consider when grooming a horse for competition.

=== By discipline ===
- Pleasure riding: usually the mane is kept natural or pulled, as preferred by the rider.
- Hunt seat: the mane is pulled to about 3.5 to 5 inches (89 to 127 mm), and braided with "hunter braids" for all important competition (usually on the right side). When the mane is braided, the forelock should also be braided.
- Show jumping: the mane may be braided (usually with "button braids", although a nicely pulled mane is acceptable. The forelock may or may not be braided.
- Dressage: the mane is usually pulled and braided for all recognized competition, braiding is seen on either side of the neck. The forelock is sometimes left unbraided, especially in the case of stallions.
- Eventing: pulled. Braided for dressage with "knob" or "button braids" (although not always at the lower levels). Usually left unbraided for cross-country, as the rider may need to grab it. May be braided for stadium (usually at the higher levels).

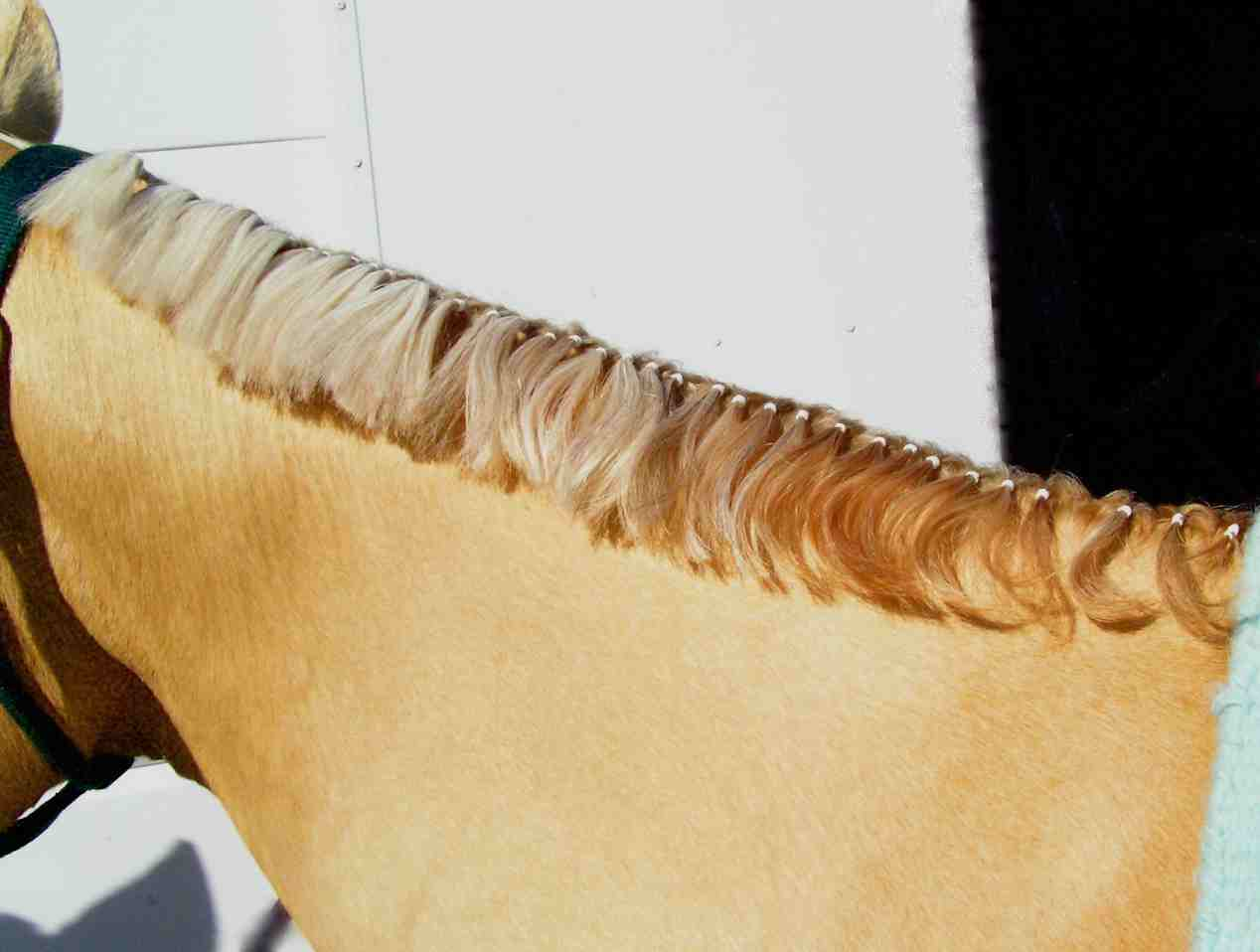
A banded mane. This mane has been pulled and thinned prior to banding.

- Western pleasure: usually pulled, usually a bit shorter than for English disciplines, and "banded" (rubber bands placed around small sections of mane) for stock breeds such as the American Quarter Horse, left unpulled and natural for other breeds.
- Reining and cutting: usually natural, forelock may be braided.
- Stock seat equitation: Same as western pleasure.
- Saddle seat: Natural, although a few long braids (usually forelock and 1 or 2 in the mane) are permitted on gaited breeds and on American Saddlebreds, usually with a colorful ribbon attached that complements the rider's clothing. Three-gaited Saddlebreds have roached manes; in five-gaited Saddlebreds the mane is left long, with a long bridle path.
- Fox hunting: pulled and braided, usually on the right side.
- Combined driving: Usually styled according to breed. Pulled and braided for sport horses.
- Polo: roached, to keep it out of the way of the mallet.
- Flat racing or steeplechase: pulled, sometimes braided.
- Harness racing: pulled or natural, Standardbreds often with a long bridle path.
- Endurance riding: usually left natural, although it varies according to breed.

=== By breed ===
Certain breeds are often expected to have a specific styling to their manes. Common styles for the United States are as follows:

- Breeds, like the Andalusian, Lusitano, and Friesian, usually have their manes left natural, and as long as possible, though in some horse show competition, the manes may be put in French braids down the crest of the neck.
- Saddlebred: Usually left long and natural, with "5-gaited" and pleasure horses having braiding in the forelock and first lock of mane. Roached for "3-Gaited" park horses.
- National Show Horse: long and natural, with long bridle path, usually 6–8 inches (150–200 mm).
- Arabian and part-Arabian: long, unbraided, and natural in all events, with a long bridle path, except for horses shown in hunt seat classes. If the horse shows in multiple disciplines where a long mane is generally mandatory, the mane is French braided for dressage, show hack, or hunt seat competition, but if the animal is shown only as a hunter, jumper or in dressage, the mane may be pulled and braided.
- Morgan: long and natural, braiding only in dressage and hunt seat classes. Usually has a long bridle path.
- Stock horse type (includes Quarter Horse, Paint horse, Appaloosa): bridle path usually cut to the length of the horse's ear laid back against the neck (3–4 inches (76–102 mm)), pulled mane, usually banded for Western pleasure and halter, braided for hunter competition. Usually kept long and natural for reining and cutting. Length varies for rodeo competition, often left long in some speed events, sometimes roached for roping events so that rope does not tangle in the mane.
- Warmbloods: pulled mane, usually braided (either side). Short bridle path 1–2 inches (25–51 mm) in length.
- Thoroughbred: pulled with short bridle path. May be braided depending on discipline.
- Shetland Pony: long mane with 4–6 inches (100–150 mm) bridle path, may have a lock of mane braided.
- Icelandic horse: nowadays manes are left untrimmed, bridle path clipping is inappropriate. Thick and long manes are preferred.
- Fjord horse: breed standard for show dictates the mane to be cut to flatter the topline. Usually cut to a crescent shape to enhance the neck topline and to show off the two-colored mane.
- Finnhorse: mane and tail are left natural for conformational showing. They may be, but rarely are, braided for other disciplines.

== Pulling ==
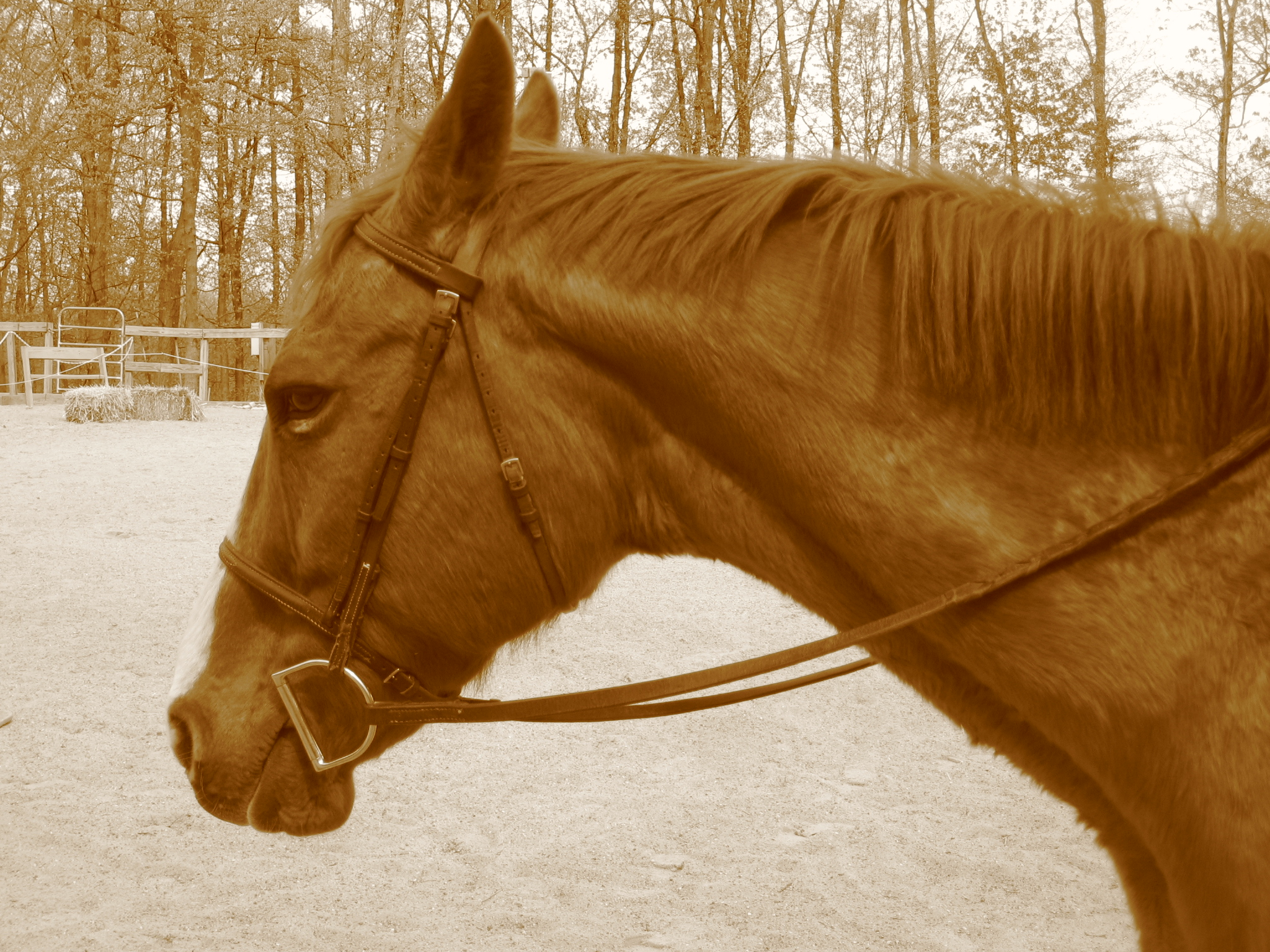
A shortened or "pulled" mane

The mane is often pulled to shorten and thin it. It gives a much neater appearance than simply trimming it with scissors, which does not thin the mane enough to braid and creates an unnatural line. Pulling also makes the mane more manageable, as a pulled mane is less likely to get tangled than a natural one.

Most horses do not object to mane pulling, and willingly stand for the process. To make it more comfortable for the horse, a groom should pull the mane out of the crest in an upwards direction, rather than sideways or down. An application of Orajel or clove oil on the roots of the mane can help desensitize the area during the pulling process. It is also recommended that pulling is performed right after exercise, when it is thought that the mane comes out more easily because the pores are open. Using a mane pulling device such as the ManePuller may also be considered because it tends to be quicker and therefore less stressful for the horse (and groom).

In some cases, a horse is very sensitive and may constantly toss its head or try to bite if the groom attempts to pull the mane. In this case, only a few hairs should be taken out at a time, with the pulling process spanning over several days, and the groom should try to keep up with the process so that the horse will not have to endure a long session right before competition.

Competitors in a hurry sometime use thinning shears to trim the mane and give the appearance of having been pulled. However, the effect only lasts a couple of weeks at most before the cut hairs begin to grow out and stick up straight into the air. Thus, this method is not advised. Pulled manes also grow out, but take longer, and when the hair begins to grow, it is less stiff and tends to blend more easily with the existing mane.

== Roaching and hogging ==
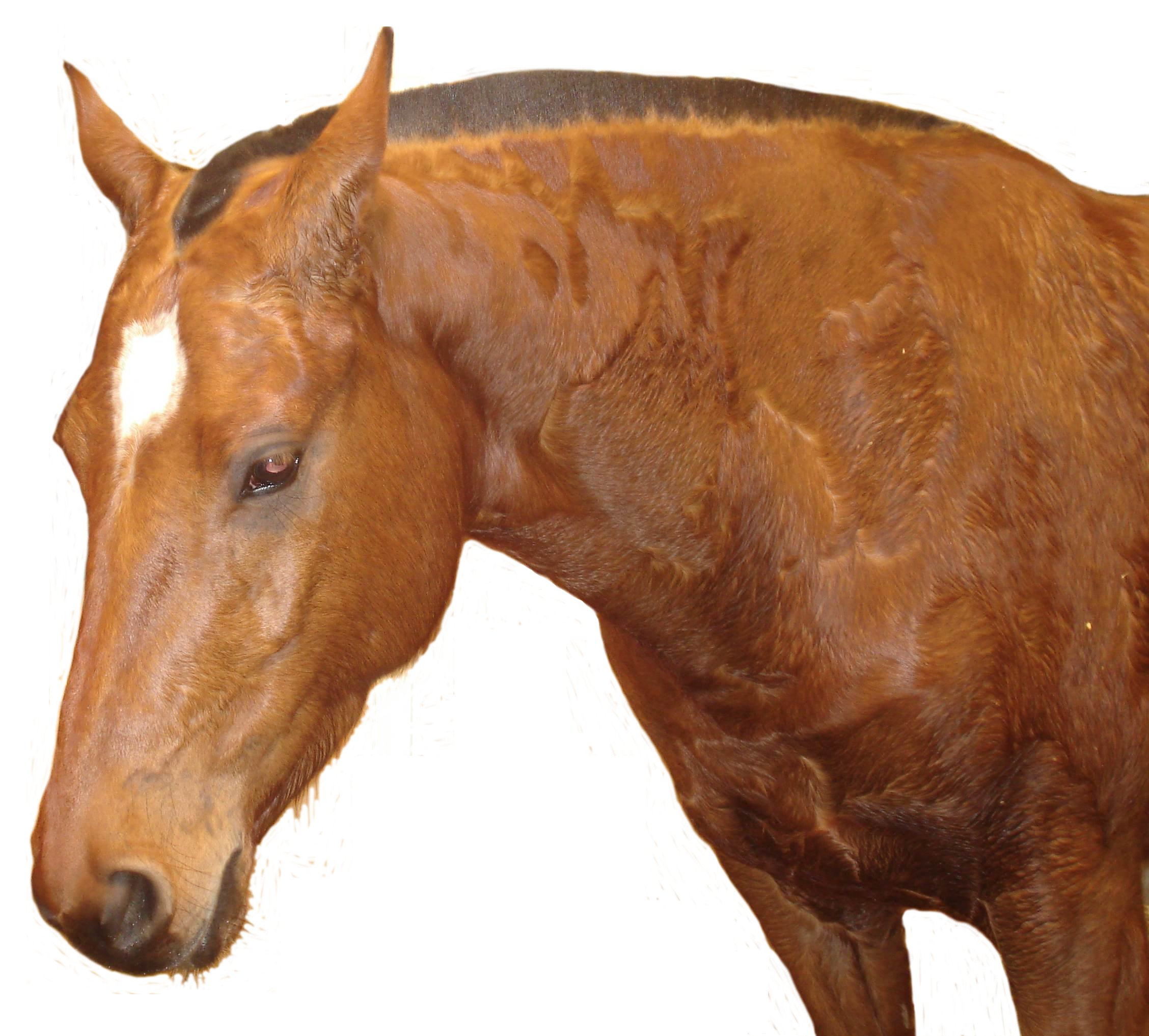
Roached mane and forelock

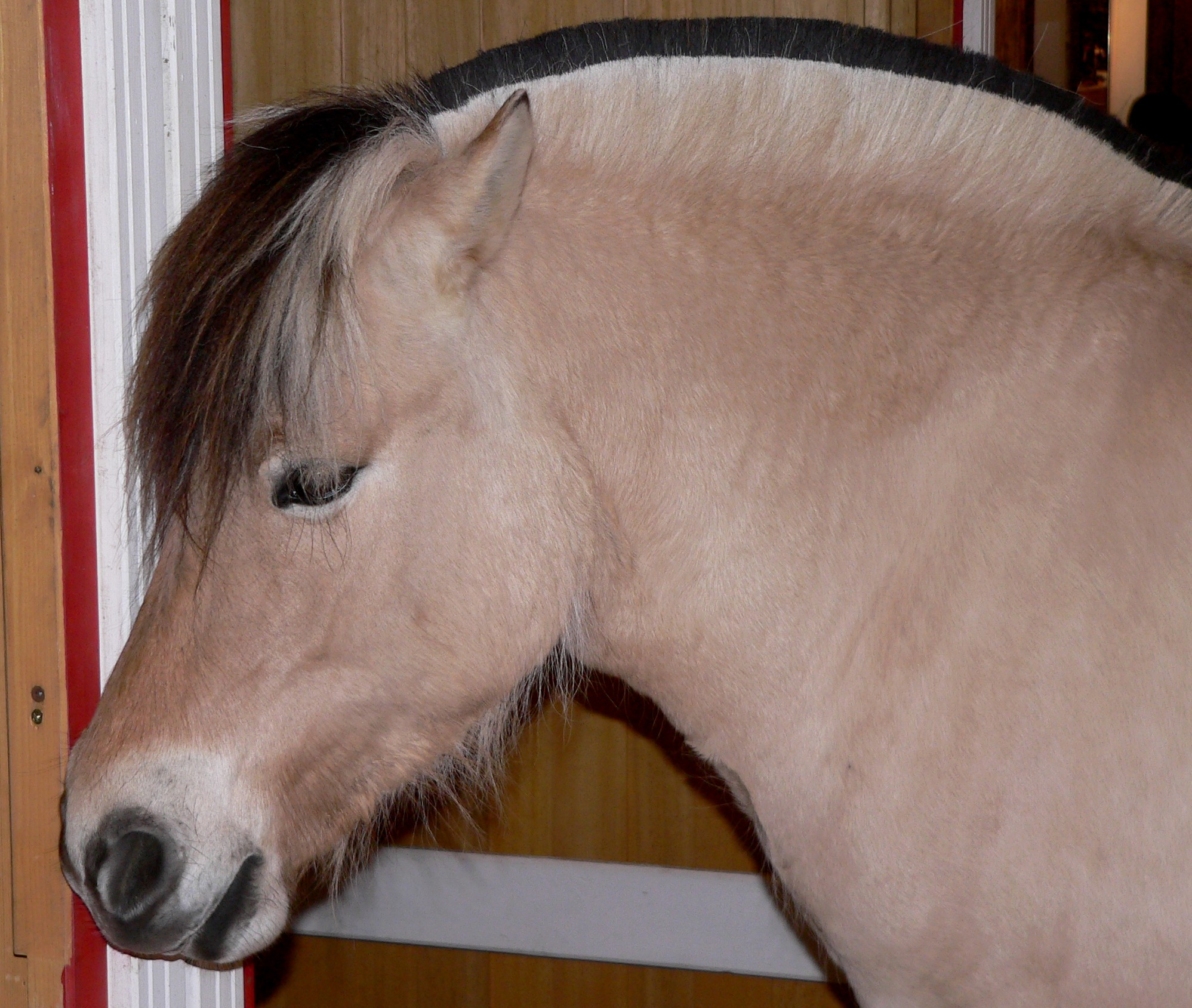
A typical Fjord horse mane treatment

When the mane, and sometimes forelock, is completely shaven off, it is called roaching in the USA, and hogging in the UK.

This is usually done if a horse's mane is quite ragged, or for certain disciplines such as polo, polocrosse, and calf roping, to keep the mane out of the way. Cobs can be shown with a roached mane and it is also common to roach the mane for certain breeds. In Spain, breeders commonly roach the mane of mares and foals. The same applies to the Swiss Freiberger horses. The American Saddlebred "3-Gaited" horse is often shown with a roached mane, though the "5-Gaited" Saddlebred is shown with a full mane.

If a mane is roached, it can take 6–8 months for it to stop sticking straight up in the air and lie over onto the neck, and a year or more to return to a natural length. For this reason, manes that are roached usually need to be kept that way, though occasionally roaching a damaged mane and allowing it to grow out evenly can be effective to restore it to a smooth appearance.

The Fjord horse mane is also considered roaching or hogging, though it is sometimes called cobbing. The mane is cut short to remain upright, and is not shaved all the way down to the neck. The forelock is left natural.

== Braiding (USA) or plaiting (UK) ==
Today, braiding is performed to show off the neck and accentuate the top line. Braiding may be used to hide conformation faults of the neck—for example, a relatively short neck braided with a greater number of smaller braids makes the neck appear longer. Braiding can be used to tame and train a mane to lie on a single side of the neck if some of the mane has been falling to the other side.

Traditionally, the mane is braided on the right side of the neck. This is still the standard for show hunters in the United States and eventers, although dressage horses are commonly braided on either side. It used to be traditional in the USA that male horses would have an odd number of braids, and even number for mares; however, this rule is rarely followed by modern braiders.

=== Types of braids ===
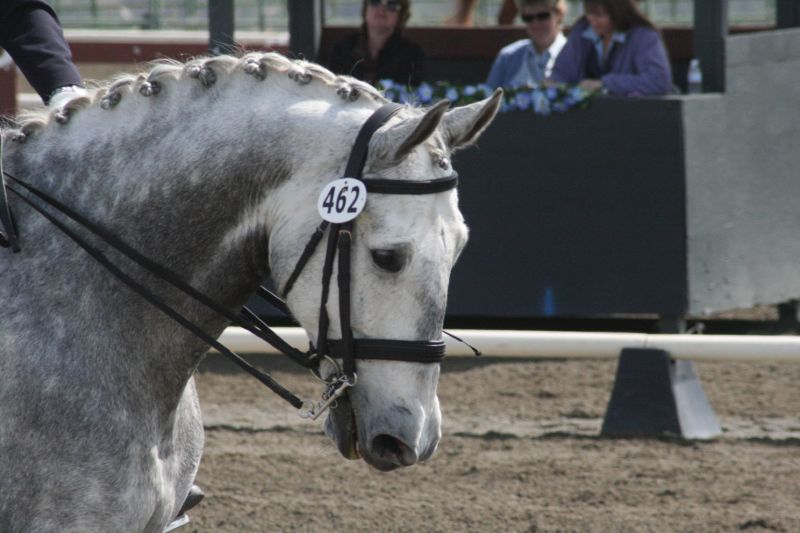
Button braids

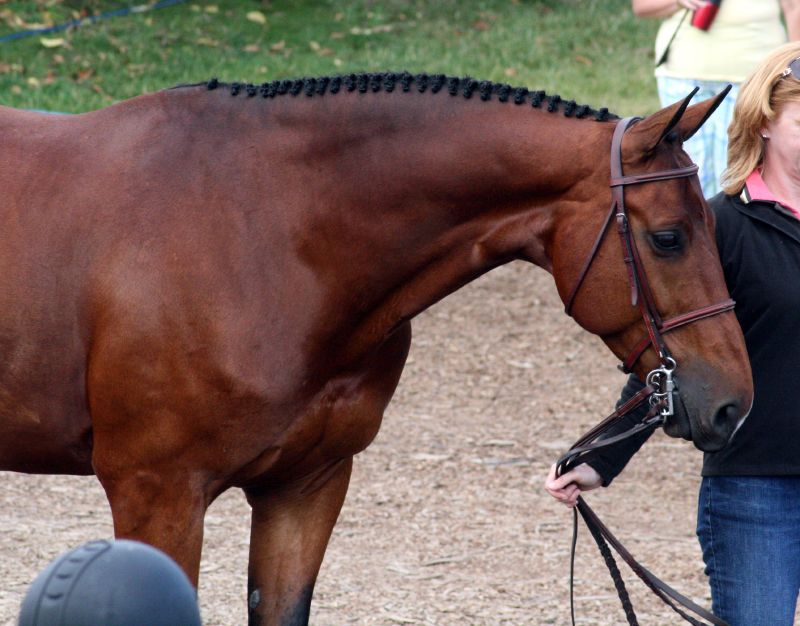
Hunter braids

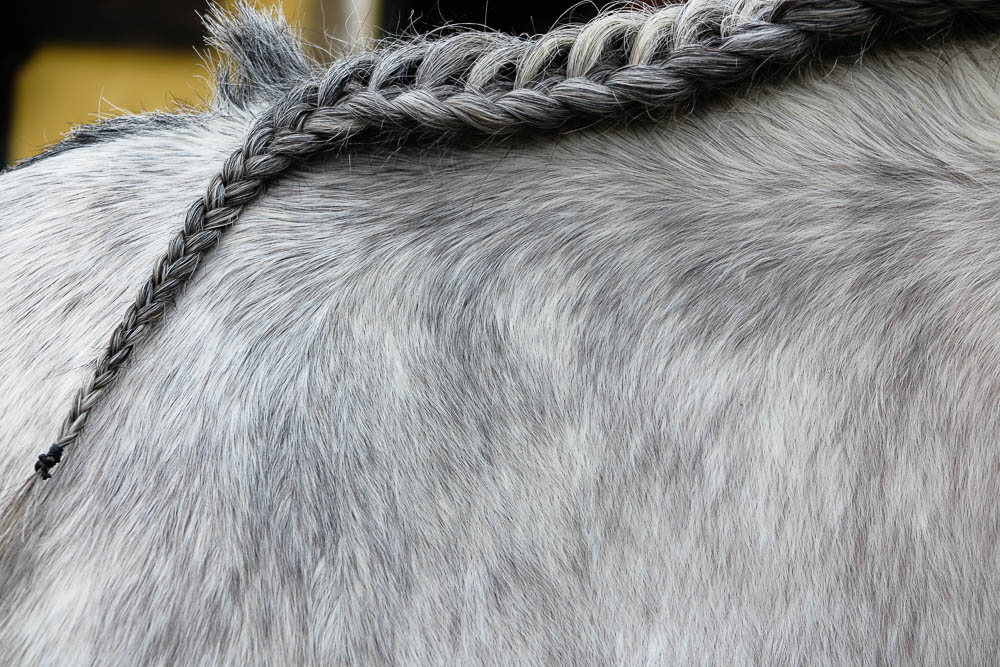
Running braid

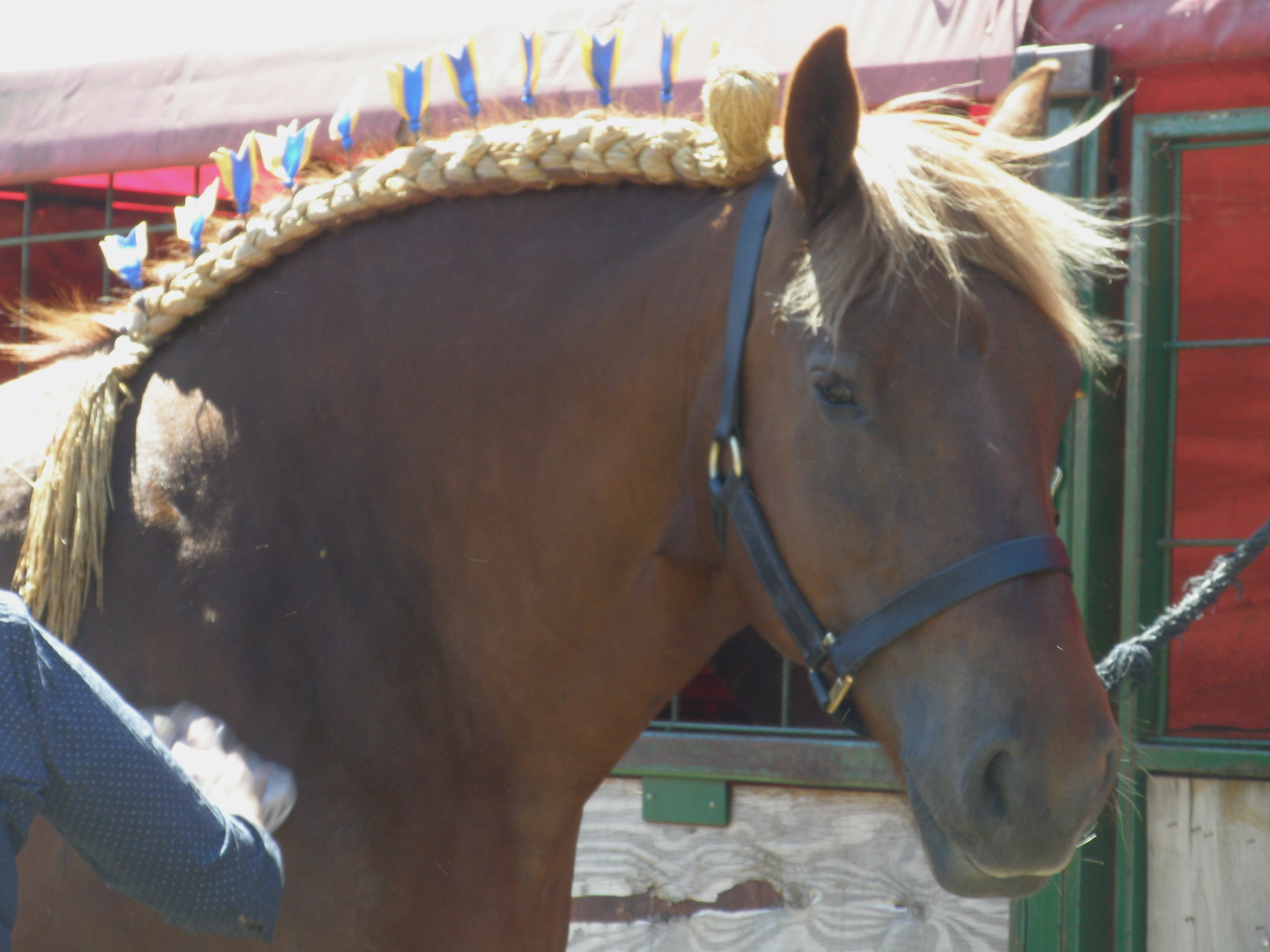
Mane roll with rosettes

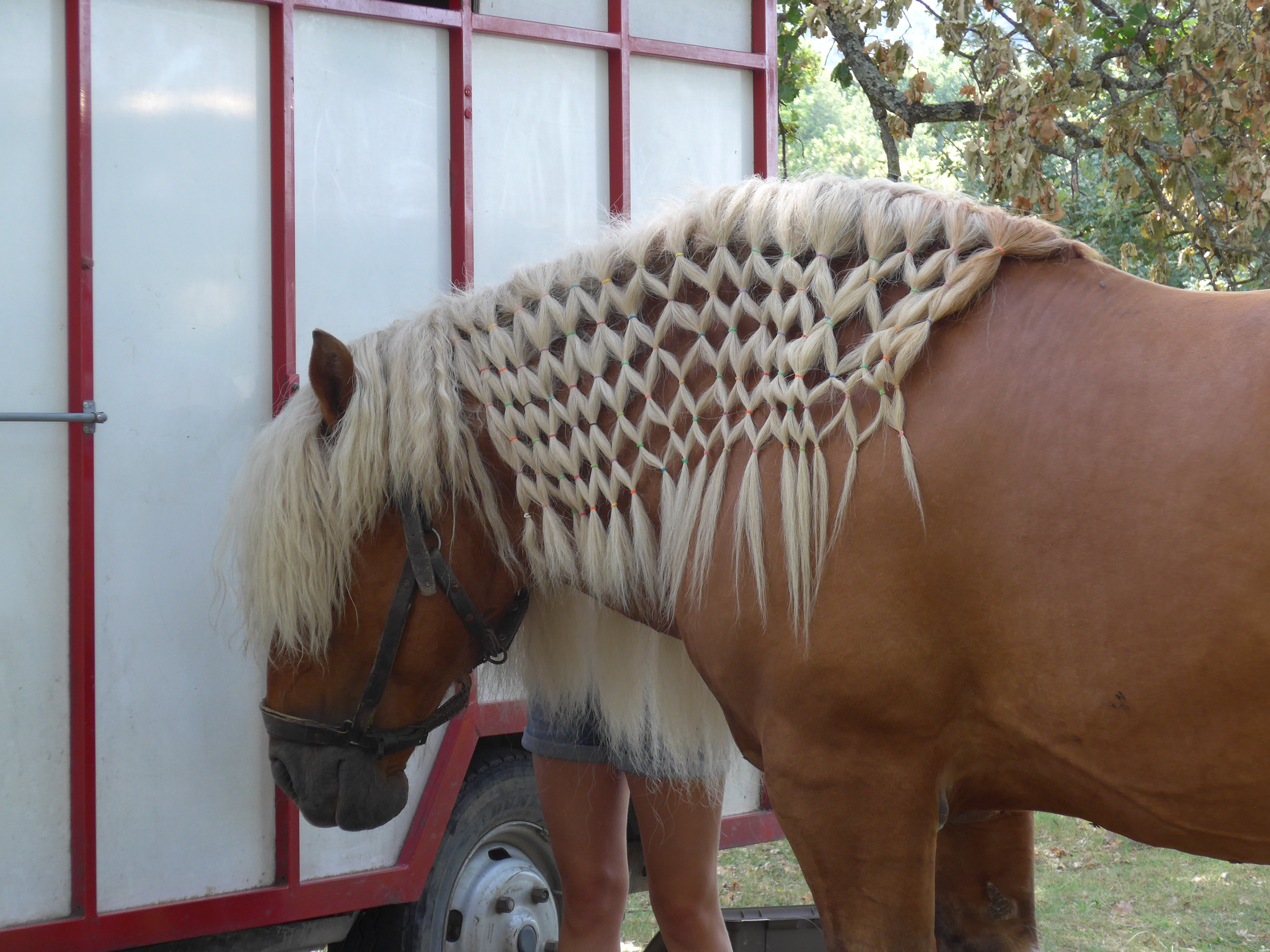
Continental braiding
- Button braids are the most common braids in both the United States and the United Kingdom, which are round and usually larger (thus fewer in number) than hunter, or "flat" braids. In the UK, show horses of all types are plaited with between 9 and 15 plaits, similar to the American "button braid". An odd number of plaits is traditional, although judges have become more relaxed about this in recent years. The number of plaits can be increased or decreased, depending on whether the rider wants the horse's neck to look longer or shorter.
- Hunter braids or flat braids are smaller, with as many as 20–30 on a neck, and they are the only braid considered traditional in US hunt seat competition. They are usually not seen in other disciplines, although they are permissible for dressage.
- Knob braids are a variation on hunter braids, involving pushing part of the braid up to create a "knob" at the top. They are usually seen in dressage competition, though are also popular in other flat classes—particularly at breed shows—as well as jumpers.
- A running braid is a variation of French braid, braided along the crest of the neck. It is used on long-maned horses, and is usually seen either when a heavy horse breed competes in dressage, or in hunter and dressage classes for horses that are otherwise required to show with a long, full mane.
- An Aberdeen plait or mane roll is a draft horse braid. It is a running braid, braided with a colored yarn or ribbon, and rosettes may be inserted to stand upright above the neck. The mane might be entirely braided, or a portion of the mane braided while allowing the rest of the mane to hang down (to make a thick mane look thinner).
- A Continental braid, also called a "macrame braid", is also useful for long-maned horses, and creates a "net" in the mane. It is not a "braid" per se, as it is usually made up of simple knots or even simply created with rubber bands or yarn, but is periodically viewed as stylish in some dressage and flat classes, particularly those in breed shows for horses that have naturally long manes.
- A scalloped mane is a less common form of braiding, where each braid is pulled up under the one which is two down from it (toward the withers), forming a series of loops. This is seen most often in hunt seat, dressage, or in the jumpers, although it is not as popular as the other forms of braid. It is useful for manes that may look bulky in traditional braiding styles because they are a bit too thick or a bit too long.

== See also ==
- Horsehair
