= Forelock =

Part of a horse's mane that falls forward

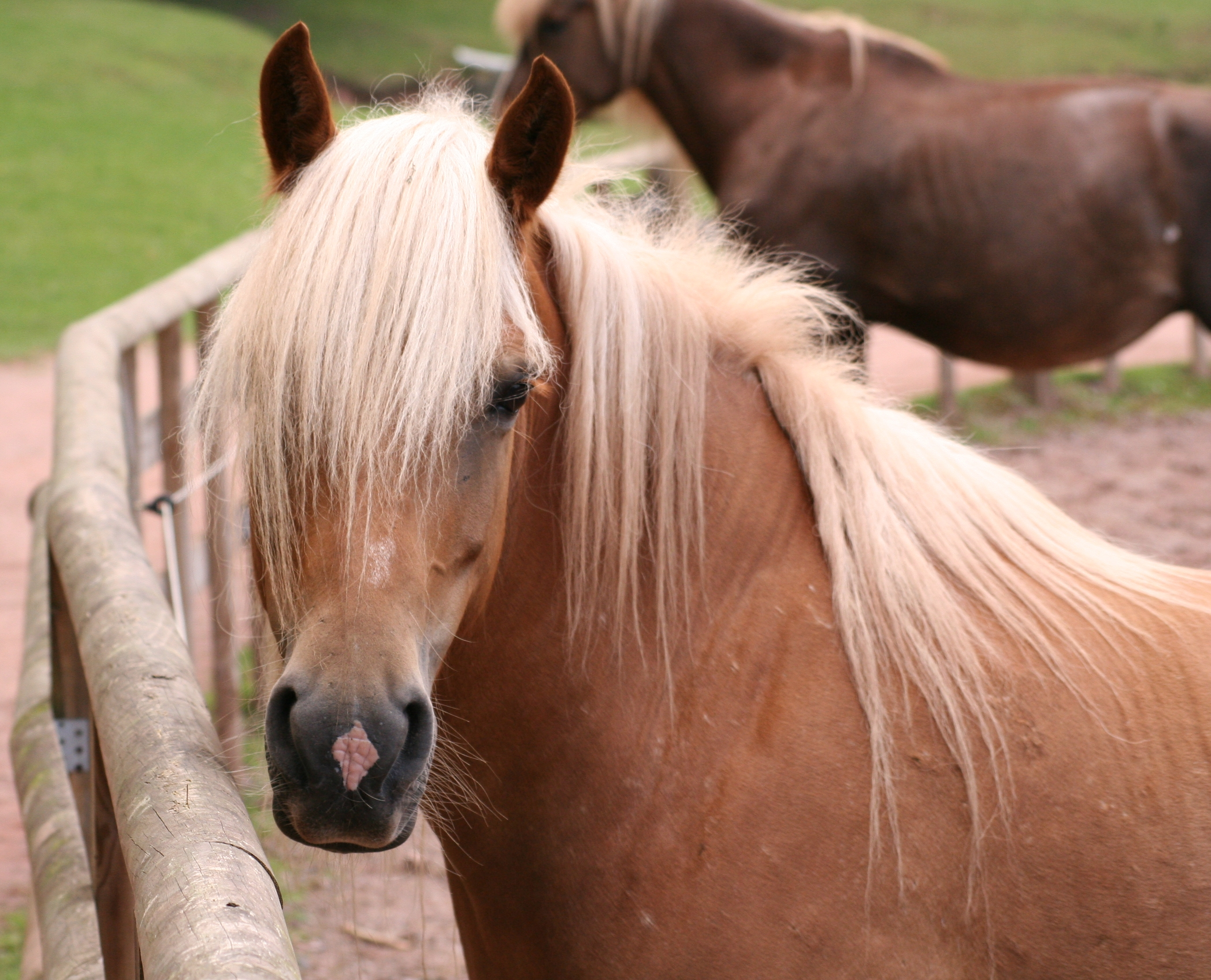
A horse with a long, thick forelock

The forelock or foretop is a part of a horse's mane, that grows from the animal's poll and falls forward between the ears and onto the forehead. Some breeds, particularly pony breeds, have a naturally thick forelock, while other breeds, such as many Thoroughbreds, have a thinner forelock. Primitive wild equines such as the Przewalski's horse have a naturally short, upright mane and, generally, no hair falling forward onto the forehead; however, elderly individuals may grow one. Other equidae such as donkeys and zebras have no discernible forelock at all.

== Purpose ==
Forelocks help a horse deal with heavy sun and heat by shielding the face and regulating temperature. A thick forelock is more prevalent in breeds developed in the cold, wet climates of northern Europe and is minimal on equines adapted to hot, dry climates, such as the zebra or donkey.

The forelock also keeps flies and other biting insects off of a horse's face.

== Grooming ==
Grooming a forelock is dependent on what activities the horse will perform and the horse's breed standard. In certain horse sport competitions, such as dressage and hunter-under-saddle, the forelock is braided. Conversely, some breeds, such as the Andalusian, are usually shown with a long, full, forelock that is never braided. Other breeds, like the Morgan, may confine the forelock with rubber bands and anchor it to the bridle. The forelock may also be roached (shaved off) in some competitions, such as polo. It is advised to make sure a horse is completely still while the forelock is being trimmed, or else the owner could accidentally cut the whole forelock off.

Quarter horses showing with the AQHA must leave their forelocks unshaved, even when the rest of the mane is roached. To keep the forelock flat on such horses (especially important on halter horses), the shorter hairs on the sides may be removed, or the bottom of the forelock may be clipped half an inch.

A forelock may be styled for aestheitc reasons. For example, a horse with large ears or a Roman nose may have its forelock left full and bushy to distract from these features.

Regardless of the horse's breed and usage, it is advised that the forelock be lightly groomed on a daily basis to untangle knots and pull out debris. Generally, one's fingers should be used, as the hair is delicate, though a hoof pick or wide-toothed comb can be used.

== Human use ==
Forelock is slang for a human hairstyle popular in the 1980s. In the 19th century, it was a common salute where a person saluted another by "tugging the forelock" (see Salute).

== See also ==
- Tail (horse)
- Mane (horse)
